= Espelette pepper =

Variety of chili pepper

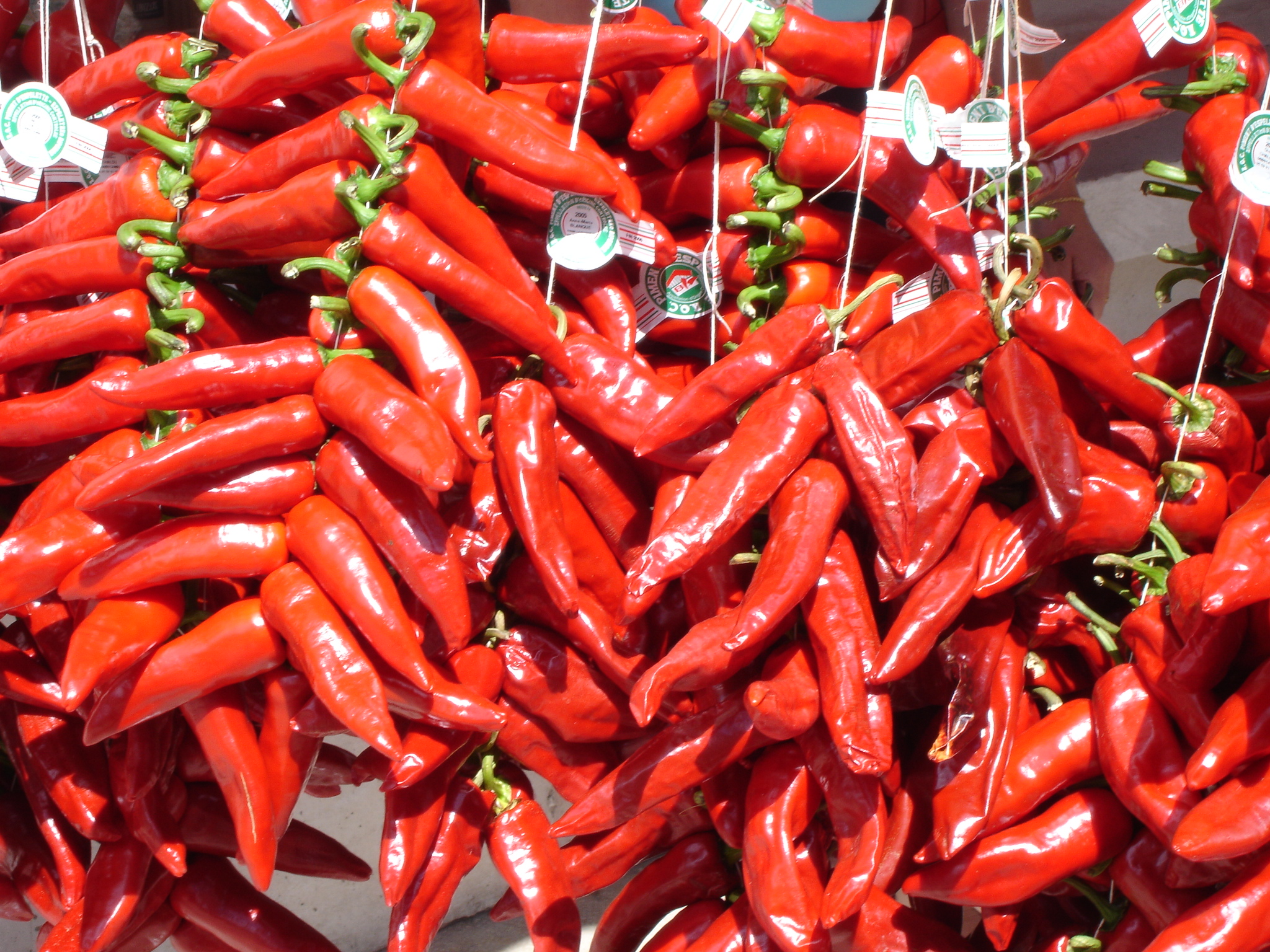
- Drying Espelette peppers
- Species: Capsicum annuum
- Origin: France
- Heat: Medium
- Scoville scale: 4,000 SHU

The Espelette pepper (French: piment d'Espelette French pronunciation: [pi.mɑ̃ dɛs.pə.lɛt] ; Basque: Ezpeletako biperra) is a variety of Capsicum annuum that is cultivated in the French commune of Espelette, Pyrénées-Atlantiques, traditionally the northern territory of the Basque people. On 1 June 2000, it was classified as an AOC product and was confirmed as a PDO (French: AOP, Appellation d'origine protégée) product on 22 August 2002. Its flavor is described as sweet, fruity, and berry-like with a mild heat.

Chili pepper, originating in Central and South America, was introduced into France during the 16th century. After first being used medicinally, it became popular as a condiment and for the conservation of meats. It is now a cornerstone of Basque cuisine, where it has gradually replaced black pepper and it is a key ingredient in piperade.

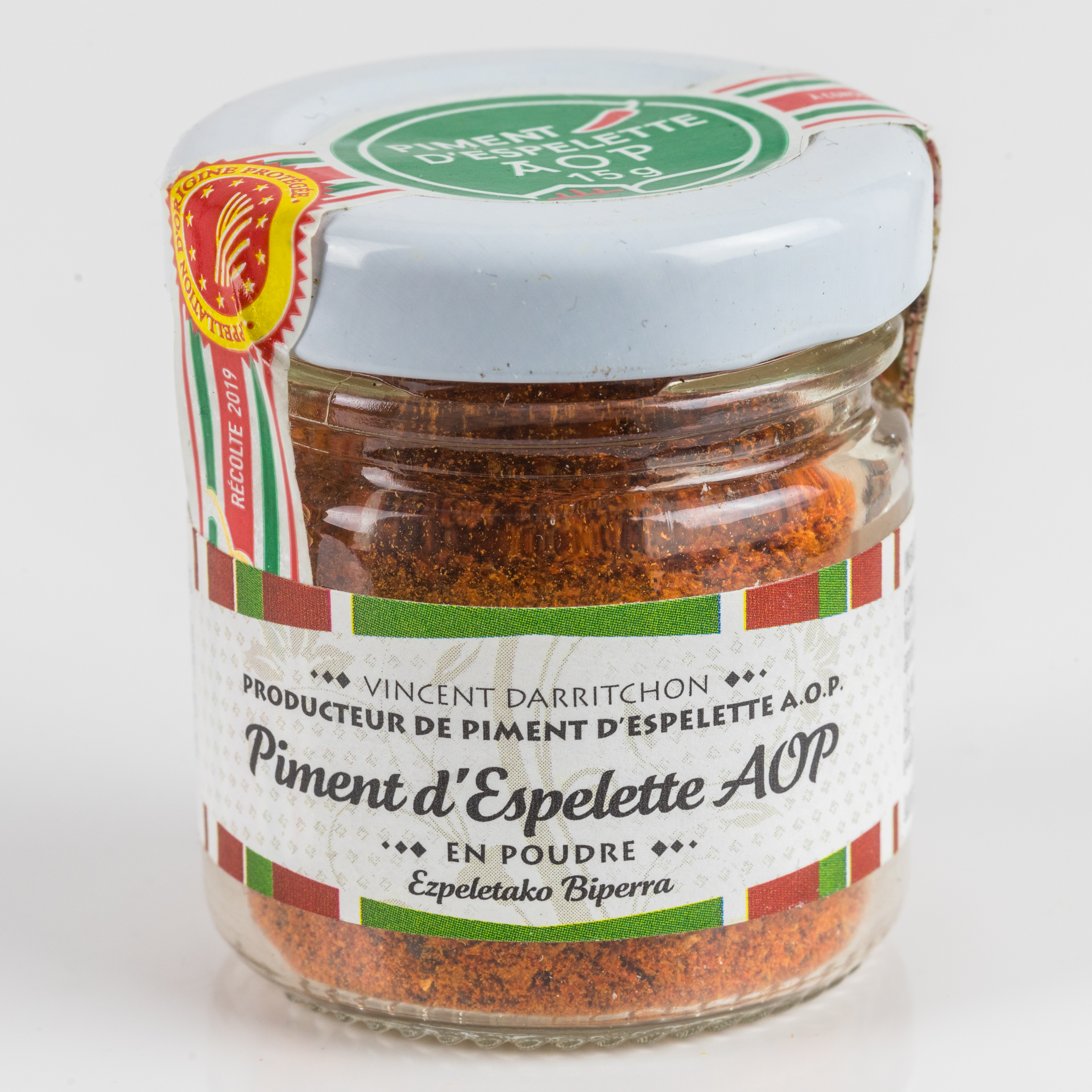
Piment d'Espelette powder

AOC/AOP espelette peppers are cultivated in the following communes: Ainhoa, Cambo-les-Bains, Espelette, Halsou, Itxassou, Jatxou, Larressore, Saint-Pée-sur-Nivelle, Souraïde, and Ustaritz. Piment d'Espelette must be produced from the Gorria variety of Capsicum annuum. Irrigation is prohibited, except for the month after planting and the plant density must be 10,000 to 30,000 plants per hectare. They are harvested in late summer and, in September, characteristic festoons of pepper are hung on balconies and house walls throughout the communes to dry out. An annual pepper festival organized by Confrérie du Piment d'Espelette, held since 1968 on the last weekend in October, attracts some 20,000 tourists.

This pepper attains a maximum grade of only 4,000 on the Scoville scale and is therefore considered only mildly hot. It can be purchased as festoons of fresh or dried peppers, as ground pepper, or puréed or pickled in jars.

In California in the United States, non-AOC espelette peppers are grown and marketed.

According to the Syndicat du Piment d’Espelette, the cooperative formed to get the AOC designation, there are 160 producers of AOC Piment d'Espelette that plant 183 hectares (450 acres) and in 2014, they produced 203 tons of powdered Piment d'Espelette and 1,300 tons of raw pepper.

== See also ==
- Paprika Tap de Cortí
