= Ainhoa, Pyrénées-Atlantiques =

Ainhoa
- Commune
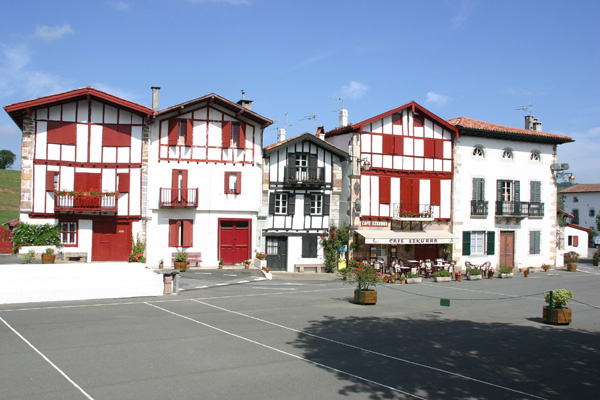
- The town square in Ainhoa

- Coat of arms
- Location of Ainhoa
- Location within France Location within Nouvelle-Aquitaine
- Coordinates: 43°18′26″N 1°29′51″W
- Country: France
- Region: Nouvelle-Aquitaine
- Department: Pyrénées-Atlantiques
- Arrondissement: Bayonne
- Canton: Ustaritz-Vallées de Nive et Nivelle
- Intercommunality: Pays Basque

Government
  - Mayor (2020–2026): Michel Ibarlucia
- Area^{1}: 16.19 km^{2} (6.25 sq mi)
- Elevation: 120 m (390 ft)
- Highest elevation: 649 m (2,129 ft)
- Lowest elevation: 52 m (171 ft)
- Population (2023): 672
  - Density: 41.5/km^{2} (108/sq mi)
- Time zone: UTC+01:00 (CET)
  - Summer (DST): UTC+02:00 (CEST)
- INSEE/Postal code: 64014 /64250
- ^{1} French Land Register data, which excludes lakes, ponds, glaciers > 1 km^{2} (0.386 sq mi or 247 acres) and river estuaries.

Ainhoa (French pronunciation: [ajnɔa]; Basque: Ainhoa) is a commune in the Pyrénées-Atlantiques department in the Nouvelle-Aquitaine region in southwestern France. It is a member of Les Plus Beaux Villages de France (The Most Beautiful Villages of France) Association.

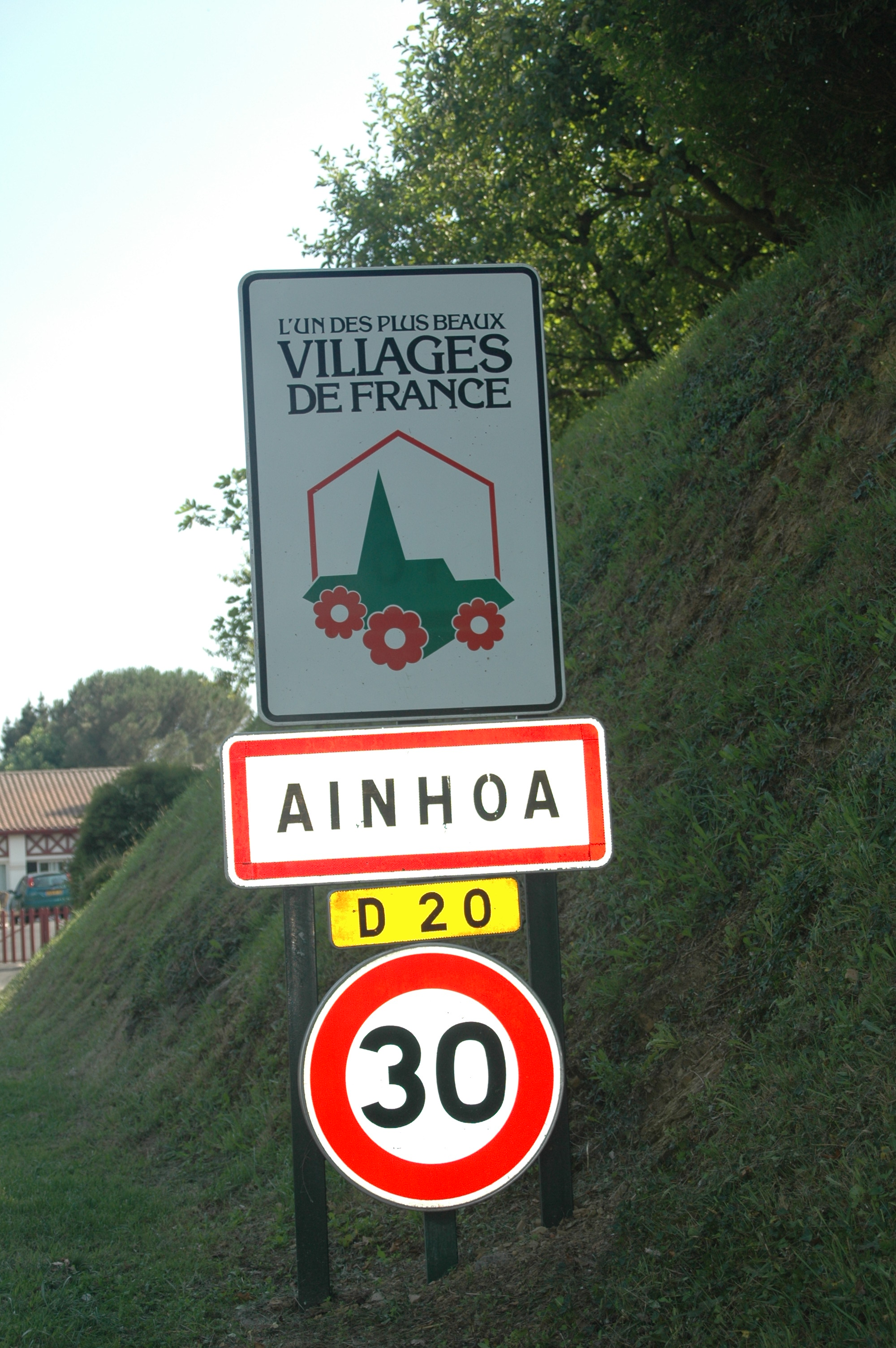
Sign at the entrance of the village

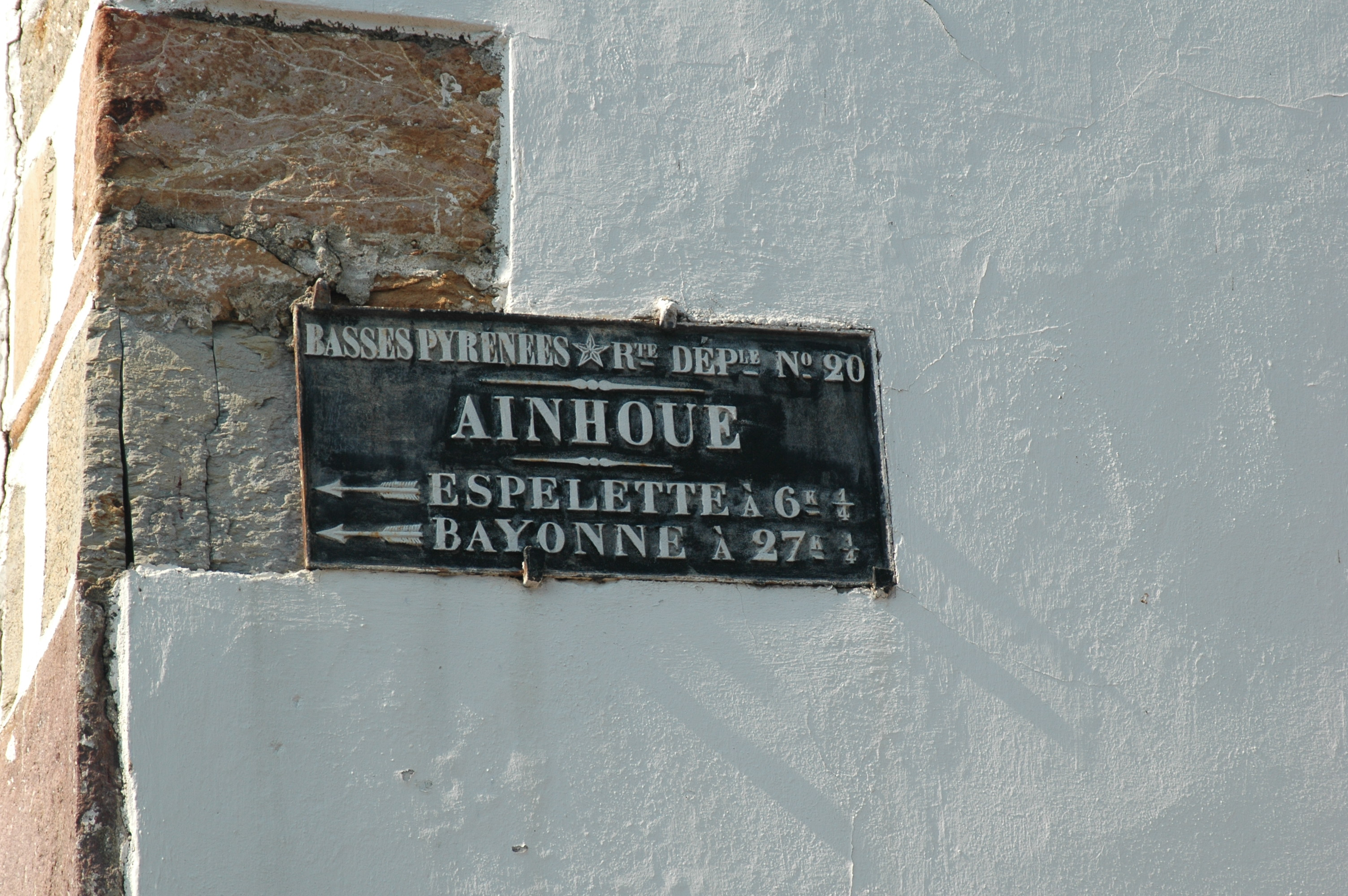
Old street sign on the Elchoinea house

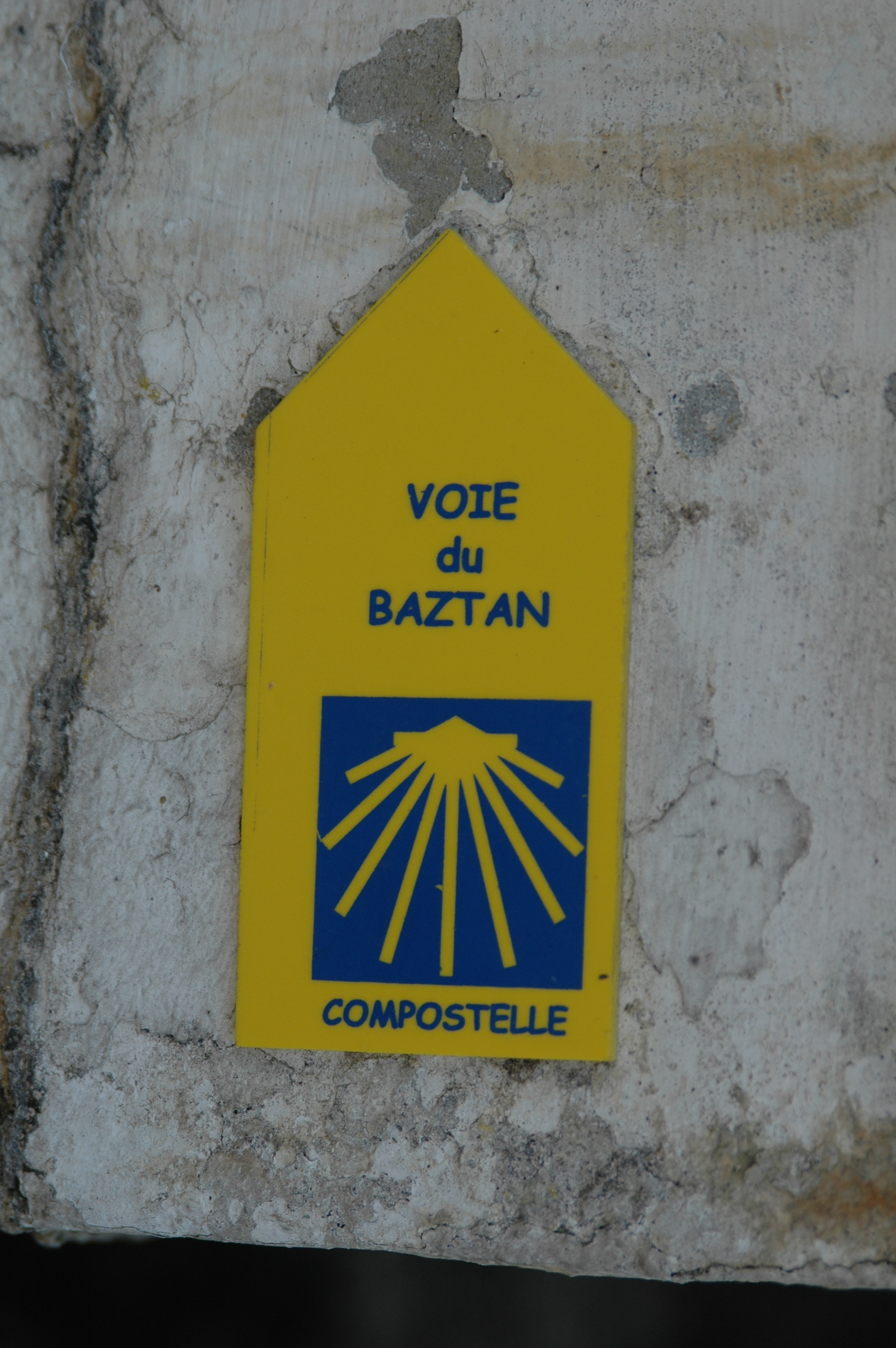
On the way to Saint Jacques de Compostela

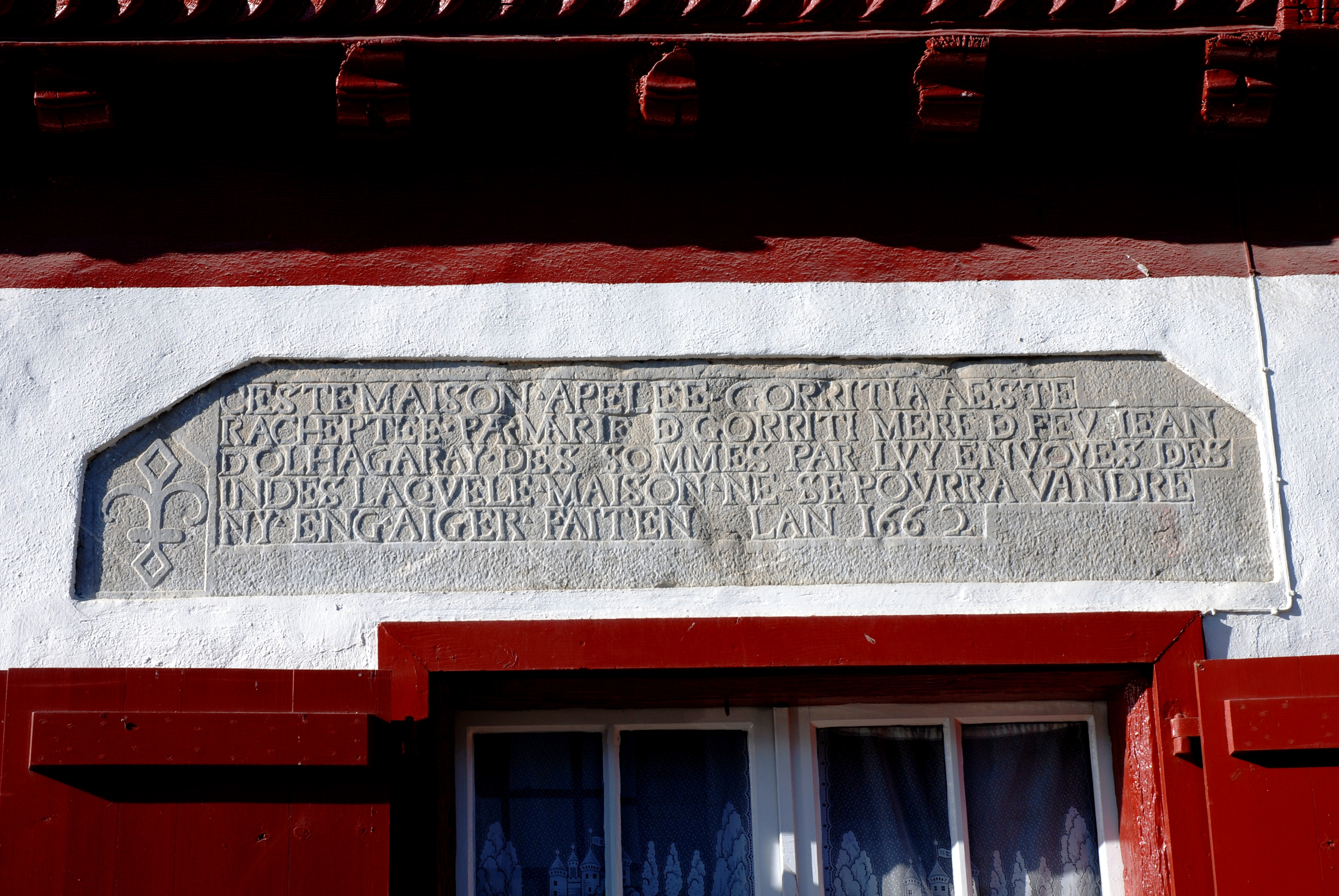
Lintel on which can be read: "This house is called Gorritia and was called this by Marie de Gorriti mother of Jean Dolhagaray because of sums of money he sent home from the indies so the house would not be sold or rented. Made in 1662"

== Geography ==
=== Location ===
The commune of Ainhoa is in the traditional Basque province of Labourd.

Ainhoa is some 20 km due south of Bayonne and is directly on the Spanish border which forms the southern border of the commune. The commune is mountainous and forested in the south-east portion but with farmland in the northwest of the commune. There is one border crossing to Spain on the southern border at the village of Dantxana.

Ainhoa and Sare, together with the two Spanish communes of Zugarramurdi and Urdazubi, form a cross-border territory, called Xareta. Straddling the border with Spain, it is a passage for the Way of St. James (Baztan way) from Bayonne to Pamplona.

The commune's border with Spain is in the Dancharia area and accesses the area of Dantxarinea d'Urdazubi.

=== Access ===
The commune is connected to Espelette in the north-east by Highway D20 which passes through the village and continues south to the Spanish border. Highway D305 branches west off the D20 and continues west to join Highway D4 before Cherchebruit. A network of small country roads covers all parts of the commune.

=== Hydrography ===
Located in the watershed of the Adour, the Nivelle river runs along the southern border and forms the border between France and Spain. Numerous streams arise in the commune and flow down to the Nivelle including the Opalazioko erreka, the Lapitxuri and its tributaries, the Larreko erreka, the Erdiko erreka, the Farendeiko erreka, the Haitzagerriko erreka, and the Barretako erreka. Paul Raymond mentions the Haïçaguerry, a tributary of the Nivelle, which descended to Gorospila on the Spanish border, and which crossed the territory of Ainhoue (the old spelling of Ainhoa).

=== Localities and hamlets ===
- Agerrea
- Akatenea
- Arbonakoborda
- Armaia
- Armaiaetxeberria
- Arotxenborda
- Barnetxekoborda
- Capera
- Chapelle d'Arantze
- Col de Gorospil
- Dantxaria
- Dolharekoborda
- Esponda
- Ezpondakoborda
- Fulianborda
- Gaskoinenborda
- Haizagerri
- Haltienborda
- Hariztoienborda
- Harotxarenborda
- Janmarienborda
- Joaniorenborda
- Kanpainia
- Kontxoenea
- Mazondoa
- Mendiondoa
- Mentaberria
- Murruenea
- Narkoinborda
- Okilaua
- Olhatxoa
- Ordokikoborda
- Ordosgoitikoborda
- Patzikoenborda
- Peorteikoborda
- Perlaenborda
- Tanburinborda
- Ukutea
- Urrutieneko Errota
- Xara Handia
- Xarak

== Toponymy ==
The commune name in basque is the same - Ainhoa.

Brigitte Jobbé-Duval suggested that the name could come from the Basque aino which means "goat".

The following table details the origins of the commune name and other names in the commune.

Name	Spelling	Date	Source	Page	Origin	Description
Ainhoa	Aynoa	1238	Orpustan			Village
	Aynho	1243	Orpustan			
	Aignoa	1249	Orpustan			
	Aynoa	1249	Orpustan			
	Haynou	1289	Orpustan			
	Anhoe	1289	Orpustan			
	Nostre-Done d'Ainhoe	1511	Raymond	4	Saint-Claire	
	Añoa	1650	Map			
	Anhoue	1684	Raymond	4	Collations	
	Ainhoüé	1750	Cassini			
	Mendiate	18th century	Ldh/EHESS/Cassini			
	Mendiarte	1793	Raymond	4		
	Ainhone	1793	Ldh/EHESS/Cassini			
	Ainhoue	1801	Ldh/EHESS/Cassini		Bulletin des lois	
	Ainhoa	1801	Ldh/EHESS/Cassini		Bulletin des lois	
	Ainhoue	1863	Raymond	4		
	Ainhoa	19th century	Lhande			
Capéra	Capéra	1863	Raymond	41		Chapel
Dantxaria	Dancharia	1863	Raymond	54		Hamlet
Landibar	Landibar	1863	Raymond	91		Bridge on the Haïçaguerry

Sources:

- Orpustan: Jean-Baptiste Orpustan, New Basque Toponymy
- Raymond: Topographic Dictionary of the Department of Basses-Pyrenees, 1863, on the page numbers indicated in the table. (in French)
- Map: The Map of the Government-General of Guyenne and Gascony and the neighbouring region
- Cassini: Cassini Map from 1750
- Ldh/EHESS/Cassini: Des villages de Cassini aux communes d'aujourd'hui: Commune data sheet Ainhoa, EHESS (in French).
- Lhande: Pierre Lhande, Basque-French Dictionary

Origins:

- Saint-Claire: Titles of the Abbey of Sainte-Claire of Bayonne
- Collations: Collations of the Diocese of Bayonne

== History ==
The ancient redoubt of Urrizti reflects the ancient past of the area.

=== From the 13th to 17th centuries ===
Paul Raymond noted on page 4 of his 1863 dictionary that the parish of Ainhoa was in the gift of the Abbot of Urdax (Spain). The Curacy of Ainhoa was created by the Priory of the Premonstratensian of Urdazubi in the 13th century.

On 27 April 1238 the new king Theobald I of Navarre purchased the toll rights formerly instituted by Viscount Juan Pérez de Baztan, Ainhoa being then at the borders between the Duchy of Aquitaine since 1151, run by the Angevin Kings of England and the Navarrese kingdom.

Such tolls were charged to pilgrims and traders traveling to Santiago de Compostela on the Way of St. James in Galicia, Spain. Military clashes between the "English run" Basques of Aquitaine and the Navarrese in 1249 led the Seigneur of Ainhoa, in 1250, to recognize the suzerainty of King Henry III of England. By 1265 Gonzalvo Juanis, Seigneur of Ainhoa, also known as Gonzalvo Ibáñez or Gonzalvo Yáñes, did not recognize either the English or the Navarrese. However he died in 1289 and opened the way to conquest based on old historical claims. Then, Garda Arnaut de Espelette, with loyalty to the "English run" Basques of the Duchy of Aquitaine, sent a letter, dated 29 July 1289 praying the Ainhoa people to adequately connive with him. The outcome of such frontier business was to set up an "undivided" land as had been done also previously with the nearby Aldudes close to the Baztan valley.

Documents from Estella dated September 1369, some 80 years later, proved that the people from Ainhoa paid taxes to both the King of Navarre and the "English" Seneschal of the Landes territory in return for their fiscal and personal privileges.

When "English run" Bayonne surrendered to the French in 1451 it is not known if these "undivided status" villages on the English-Navarrese frontier were taken by the French as well.

In the Spanish Invasion of 1636 in the Labourd territories many villages, including Ainhoa, were razed. Later, probably because of the 1659 "Treaty of the Pyrénées" whereby the Spanish-born Queen regent of France Anne of Austria with the help of Cardinal Mazarin, the First Minister of France, set up an advantageous (for the French) peace and also obtained Maria Theresa of Spain as a wife for her son Louis XIV of France. Ainhoa was then repopulated again.

Disputes between the new settlers and the old residents concerning the use of communal lands for cattle grazing and fodder and the access by newcomers to town hall positions, schooling, church grants, etc. had to be settled by the then autonomous Parliament of Bordeaux in the sense of paying for access to village privileges.

Ainhoa was destroyed during the Thirty Years' War (1618-1648) and then rebuilt. The only remains from before the destruction are the church and the Machitorénéa House.

=== The 18th century ===
In 1724, following the revolts in Saint-Jean-le-Vieux (1685) Mouguerre and Saint-Pierre-d'Irube (1696), the people of Ainhoa revolted against the salt tax and against other new taxes. This was a prelude to the uprisings in all of Labourd in 1726 against the said taxes. Bayonne and Saint-Jean-Pied-de-Port followed in 1748.

The Law of 4 March 1790 determined a new administrative landscape of France by creating departments and districts. This resulted in the creation of the department of Basses-Pyrénées and reuniting the Béarn, the Gascon lands of Bayonne and Bidache, and the three French Basque provinces. For the latter, three districts were created: Mauleon, Saint-Palais, and Ustaritz which replaced the Bailiwick of Labourd. The seat of Ustaritz was transferred almost immediately to Bayonne. Its Director persuaded a large number of municipalities to adopt new names conforming to the spirit of the Revolution. So Ainhoa was called Mendiarte, Ustaritz became Marat-sur-Nive, Itxassou became Union, Arbonne became Constante, Saint-Étienne-de-Baïgorry became Thermopyles, Saint-Palais became Mont-Bidouze, Louhossoa became Montagne-sur-Nive, Saint-Jean-Pied-de-Port became Nive-Franche, Saint-Jean-de-Luz became Chauvin-Dragon (the name of a young soldier killed in action), and Souraïde became Mendialde.

In 1794, at the height of the Terror and after the desertion of forty seven young people from Itxassou, the Committee of Public Safety (Decree of 13 Ventôse Year II - 3 March 1794) arrested and deported some of the inhabitants (men, women and children) of Ainhoa, Ascain, Espelette, Itxassou, Sare, and Souraïde and decreed that these communes like the other communes of the Spanish border were "infamous communes". This was extended to Biriatou, Cambo-les-Bains, Larressore, Louhossoa, Mendionde, and Macaye.

The people were "united in various national houses, or in the district of Ustaritz or in the Great Redoubt, like Jean-Jacques Rousseau". In reality, they were gathered together in churches and then deported in very precarious conditions in Bayonne, Capbreton, Saint-Vincent-de-Tyrosse, and Ondres. The Departments where people from the communes were interned were the Lot, the Lot-et-Garonne, the Gers, the Landes, the Basses-Pyrénées (partly béarnaise), and Hautes-Pyrénées.

The return of exiles and the recovery of their possessions were determined by a series of decrees issued on 29 September and 1 October 1794, driven in this direction by the Director of Ustaritz who said: "The onetime communes of Sare, Itxassou, Ascain, Biriatou, and Serres, whose inhabitants were interned eight months ago as a measure of general safety, have not been improved. The people who come to obtain freedom to retire to their homes, clamour for food without my being able to procure the means to meet this primary human need, hunger.". The recovery of their possessions was not without difficulty, they were placed in receivership but were not registered and were looted: "The property, movable and immovable, of the inhabitants of Sare, were neither recorded nor legally described, and all our furniture and household effects were removed and brought confusedly to neighbouring communes. Instead of being put in safe places, some were sold at auction and sometimes sold without auction.".

=== 19th–20th centuries ===
During the retreat of the Napoleonic Army from Spain in 1813, Labourd villages were again submitted to abuse by the Confederate British and Spanish troops.

Under the German occupation of France during World War II many of these frontier villages were fully administered by the German military, but were also an escape route for British soldiers, French Resistance members, and European Jews trying to reach non-belligerent Spain.

== Heraldry ==
Arms of Ainhoa	Blazon: Or, fess bar in gules, in chief a saltorel of azure, in base a sabre gules in fesse pointed sinister surmounted by a crescent vert.

== Administration ==
List of successive mayors of Ainhoa

From	To	Name
1995	2001	Bernard Saint-Jean
2001	2008	Philippe Aspirot
2008	2010	Henri Daguerre
2010	2026	Michel Ibarlucia

=== Intercommunality ===
Ainhoa is one of seven intercommunal organisations:

- the Communauté d'agglomération du Pays Basque
- the SIVU Errebi
- the SIVU for the implementation of Natura 2000 on the Mondarrain and Artzamendi mountain ranges
- the AEP Nive-Nivelle Union
- the "Bizi Garbia" mixed union
- the union to support Basque culture
- the energy union of Pyrénées-Atlantiques

== Population ==
Historical population
Year	Pop.	±% p.a.
1968	579	—
1975	543	−0.91%
1982	544	+0.03%
1990	539	−0.12%
1999	599	+1.18%
2007	658	+1.18%
2012	669	+0.33%
2017	672	+0.09%
2023	672	+0.00%
Source: INSEE

The commune is part of the urban area of Bayonne. The inhabitants of the commune are known as Ainhoars in French.

== Economy ==
Iron ore was mined until the 19th century. Its initial operation was by the Premonstratensian of Saint-Sauveur of Urdax.

The weaving of flax (tisserands) and wool (duranguiers) persists in Ainhoa where in Hasparren it was an important activity until the advent of the textile industry in the 19th century.

Philippe Veyrin noted the existence of a factory making "chahako", small goatskins from male goats which peasants use for work or hunting. Ainhoa is part of the Appellation zone (AOC) for the production of pimentos of Espelette and also the AOC of the Ossau-Iraty. The activities in the commune are mainly agricultural and forestry (500 hectares of forest over an area of 1619 hectares). A quarry is always operating in the municipality.

== Culture and heritage ==
The town has received an award from the Most beautiful villages in France, an award from an independent organization to promote the tourist attractions of small communes rich with quality heritage.

=== Languages ===
According to the Map of the Seven Basque Provinces by Prince Louis-Lucien Bonaparte published in 1863, the dialect of Basque spoken in Ainhoa is labourdin.

=== Civil heritage ===
The village is laid out as a fortified town, with concealed labourdine houses from the 17th century and a fronton open square against the cemetery surrounding the church.

- The Alhaxurruta Fountain well is present between the village and the Dancharia area and was noticed by Napoleon III and Eugénie de Montijo during a tour here on 23 September 1858.

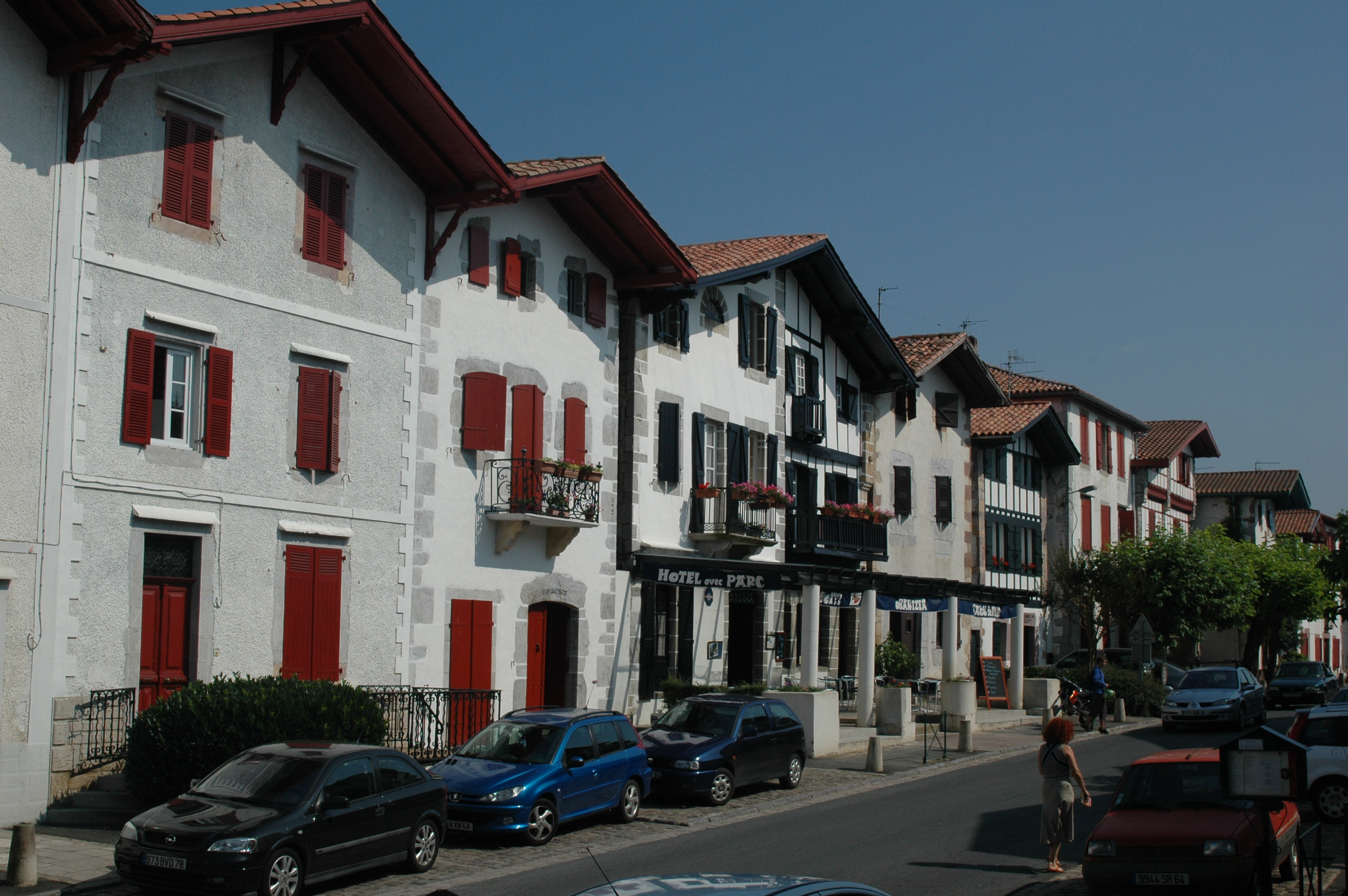
The Main Street and City Hall

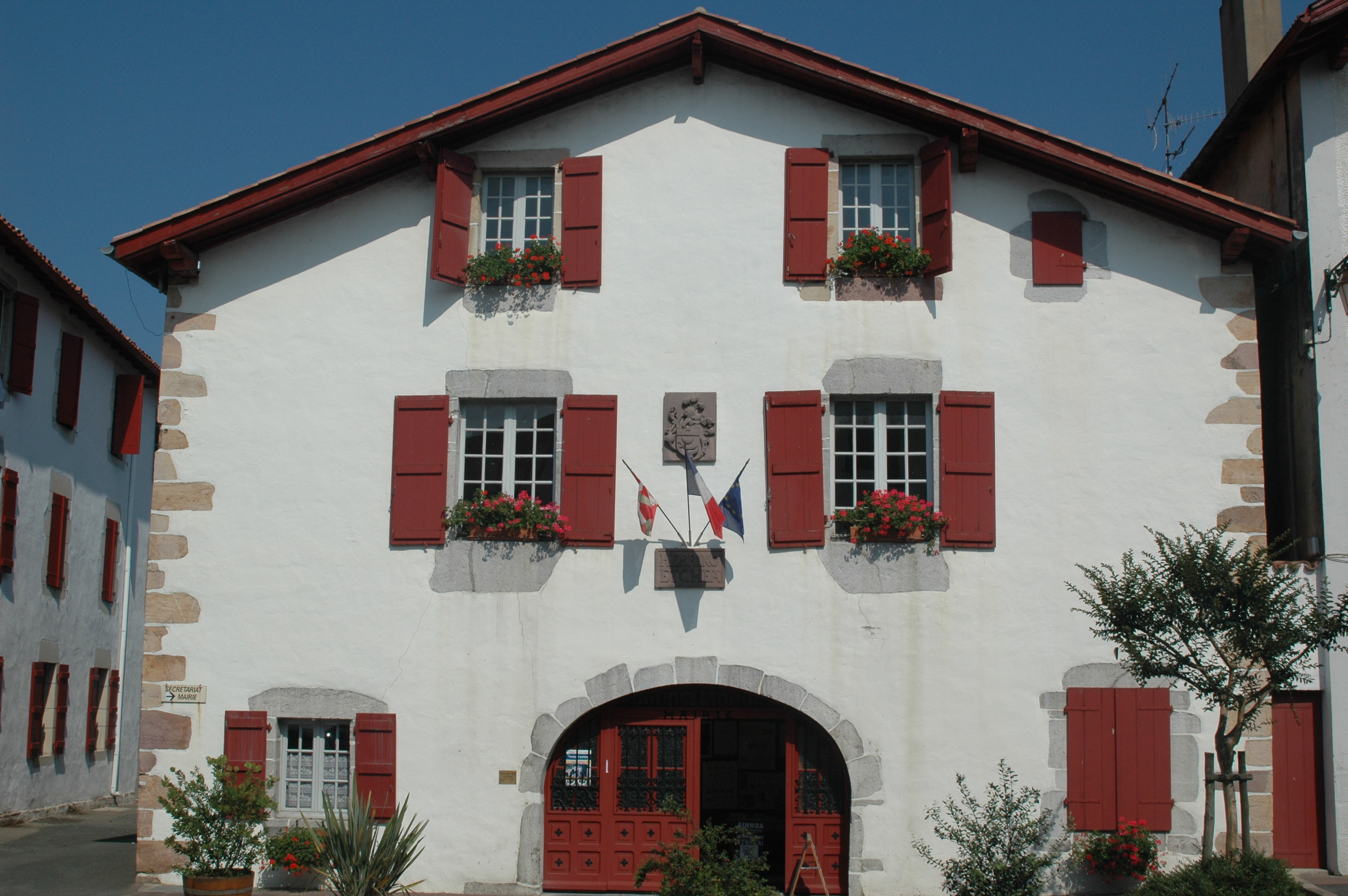
The Town Hall

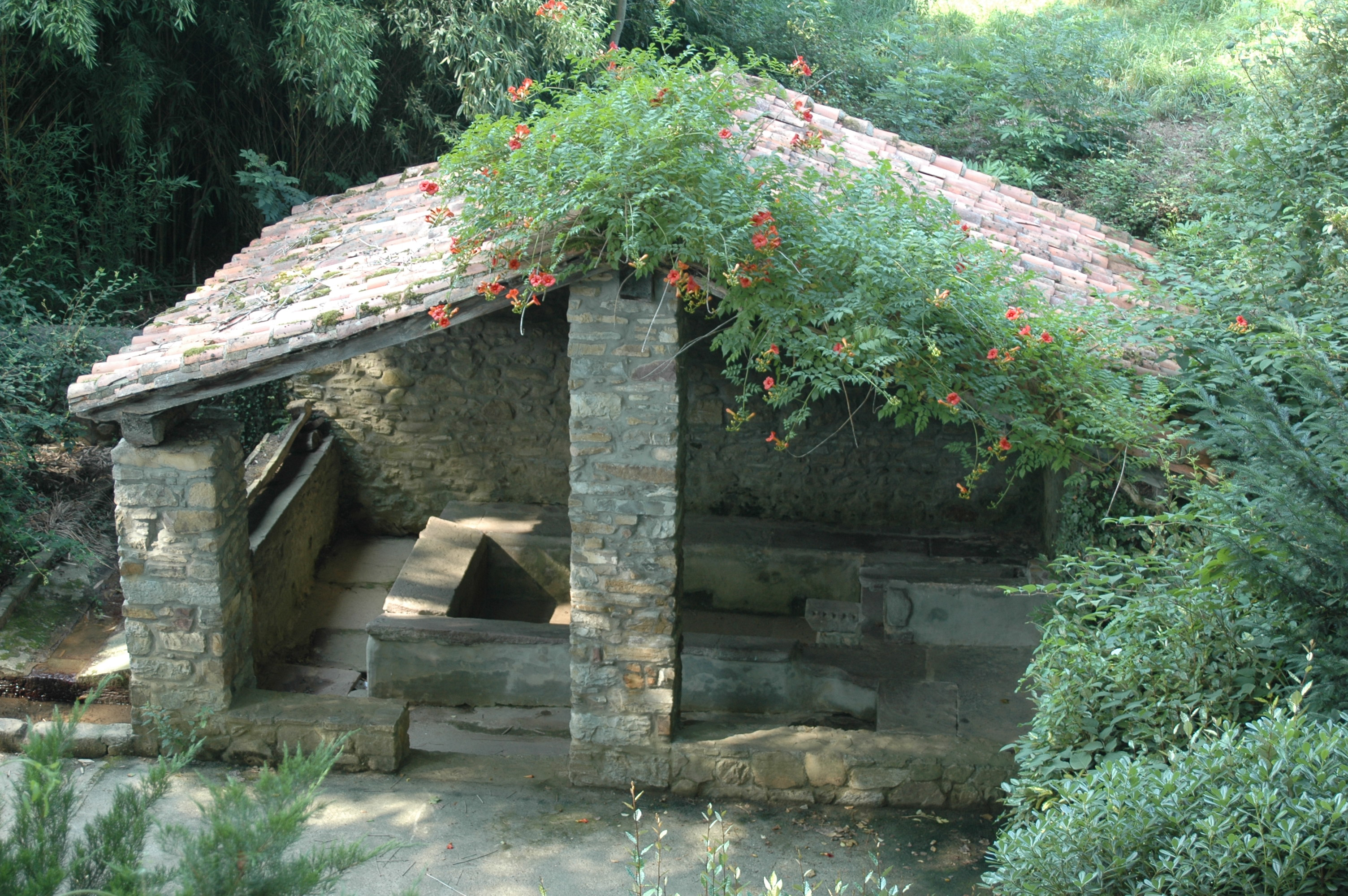
The Lavoir

=== Religious heritage ===
- The Church of Our Lady of the Assumption (13th century) is registered as an historical monument.
- The Chapel of Notre-Dame-d'Aubépine (Mary appeared to a young shepherd in a hawthorn bush (or arantza in Basque) hence the other name of the chapel Our Lady of Aranzazu) has had a Way of the Cross since 1886, a grotto since 1897, and a Calvary since 1898. In the 18th century, the parish of Ainhoa subsidized the hermit of the chapel to teach reading and writing to the shepherds and children in nearby farms who could not easily access the town.

The cemetery contains Hilarri from the 16th and 17th centuries.

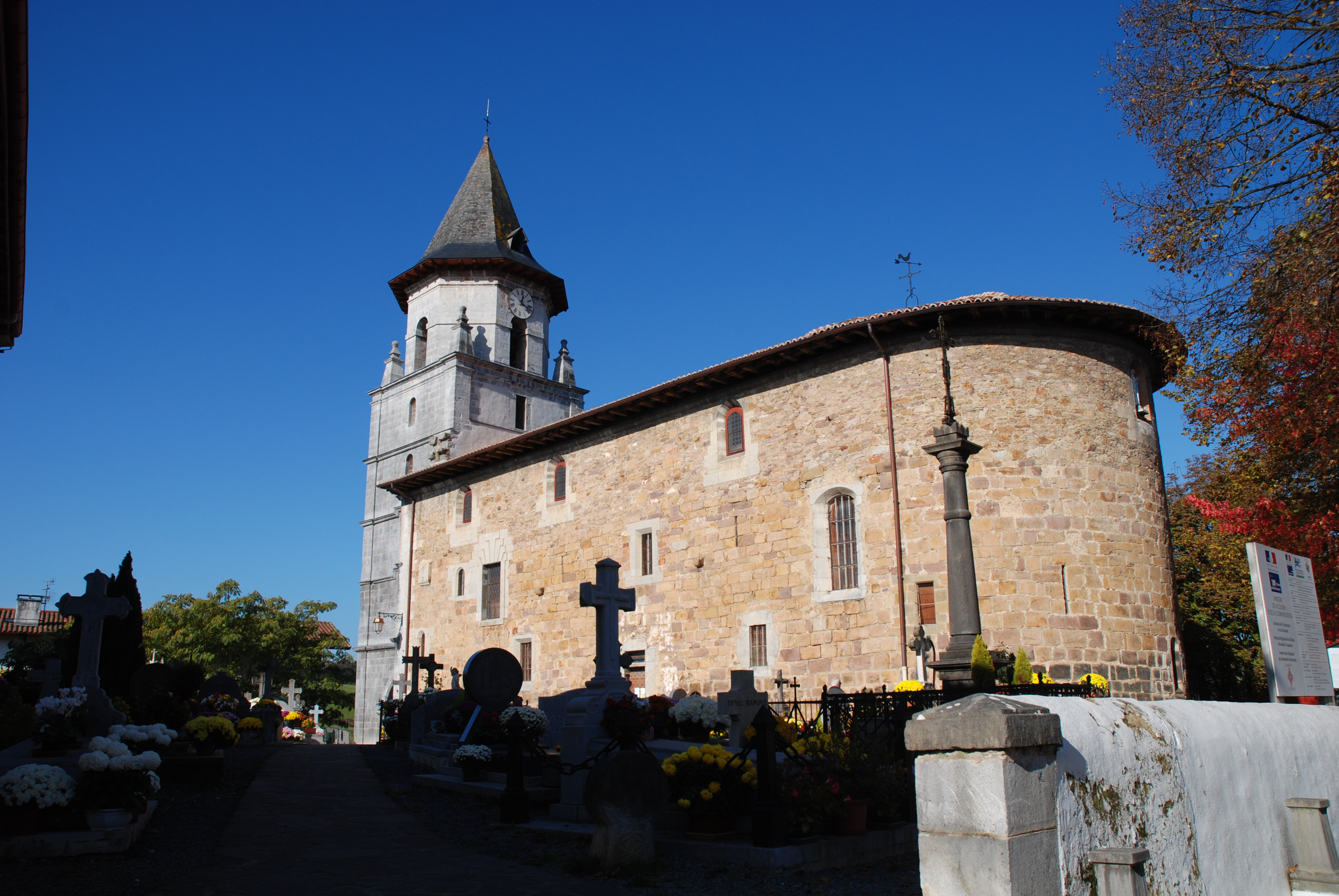
The Church of Our Lady of the Assumption

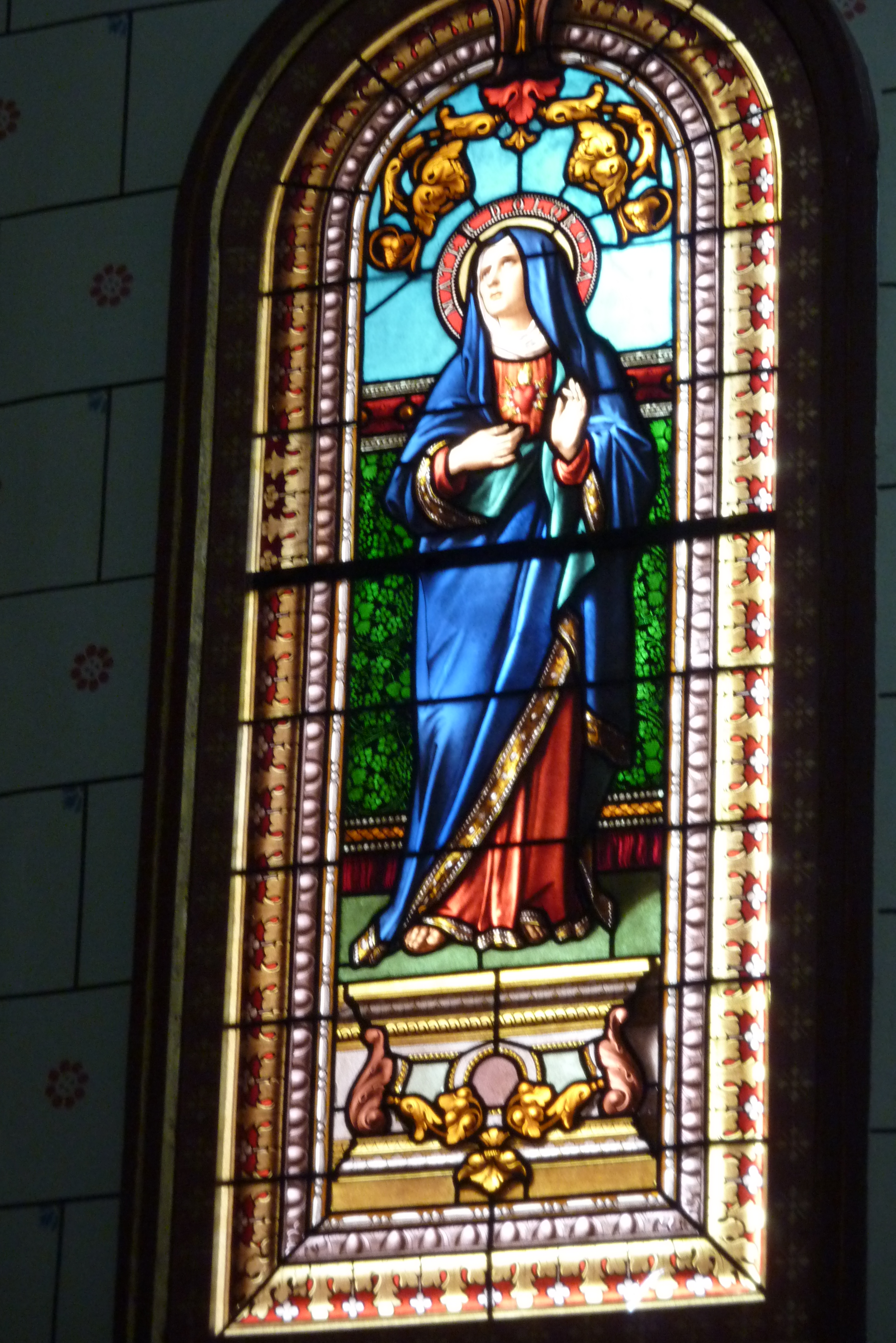
Stained glass in the church

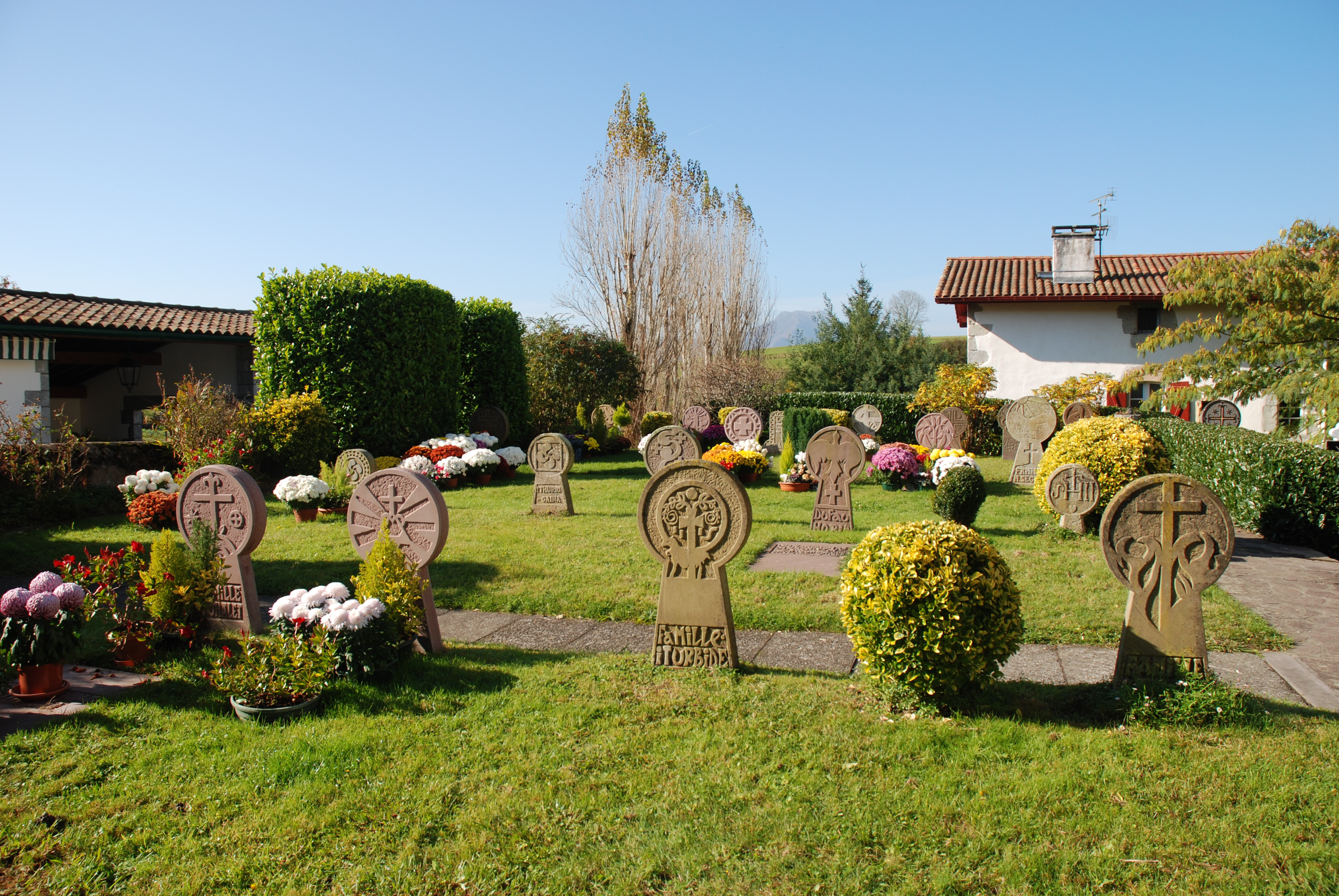
The cemetery

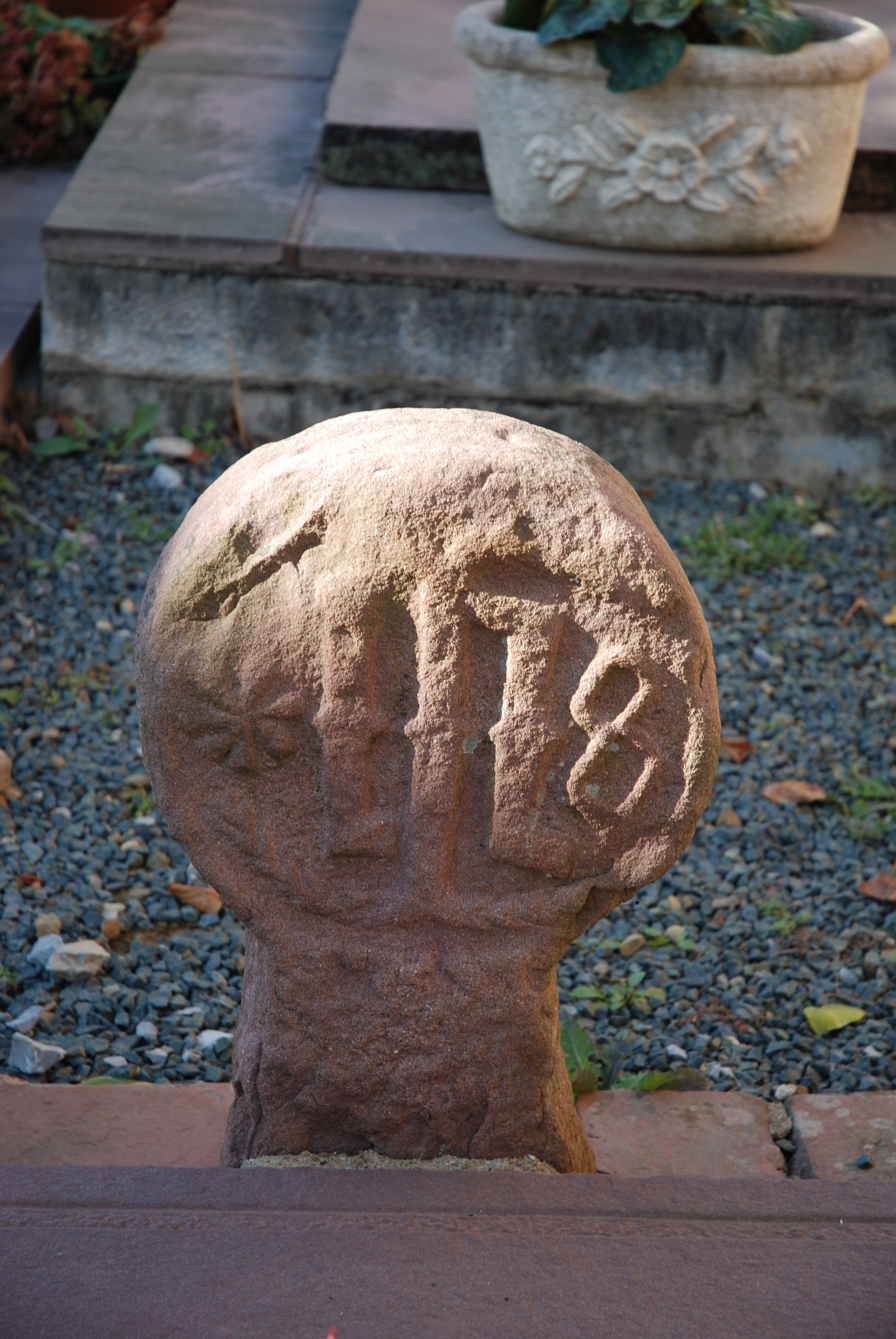
Discoidal Stele

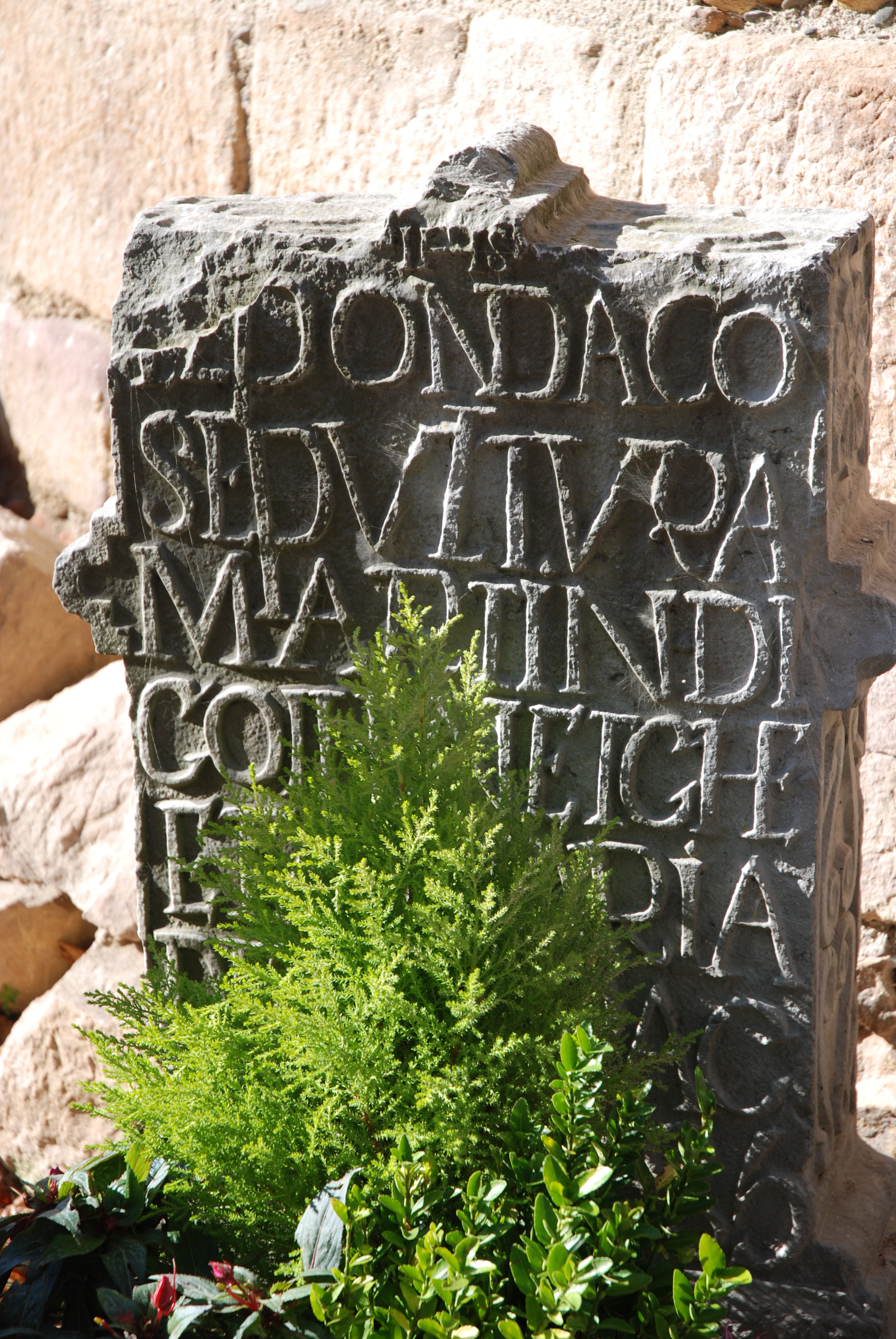
Tabular Stele

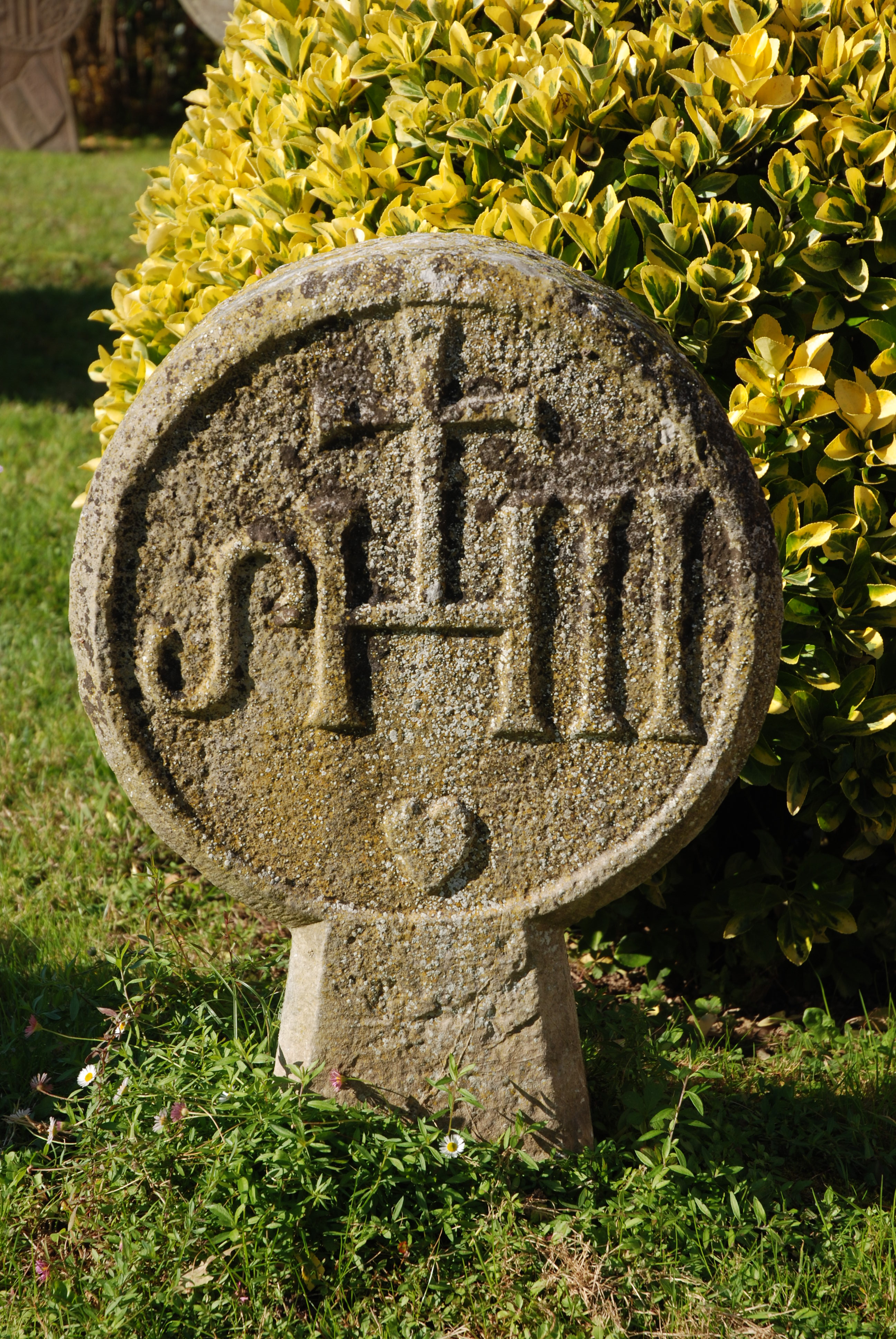
Discoidal Stele

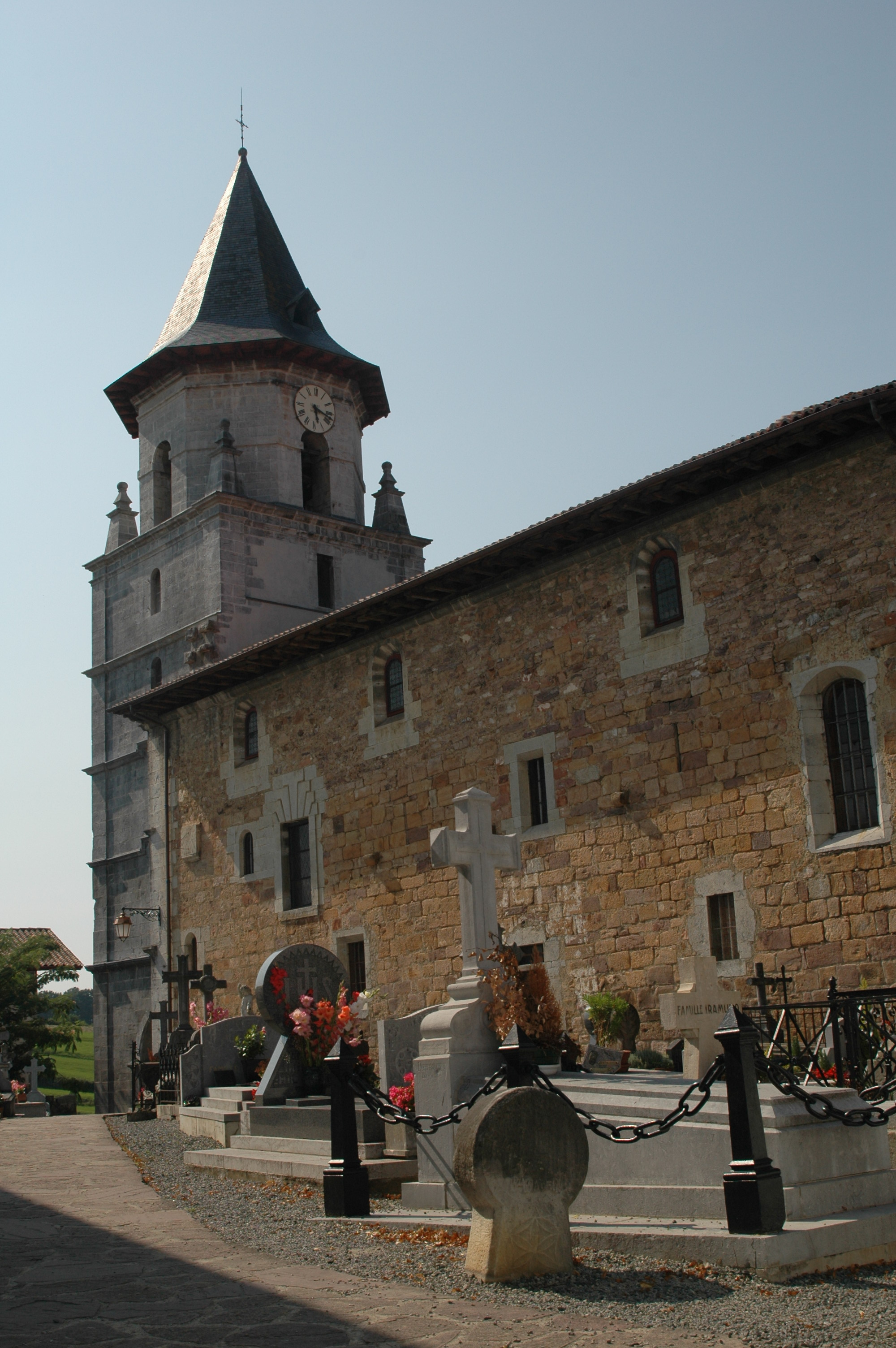
Church and cemetery

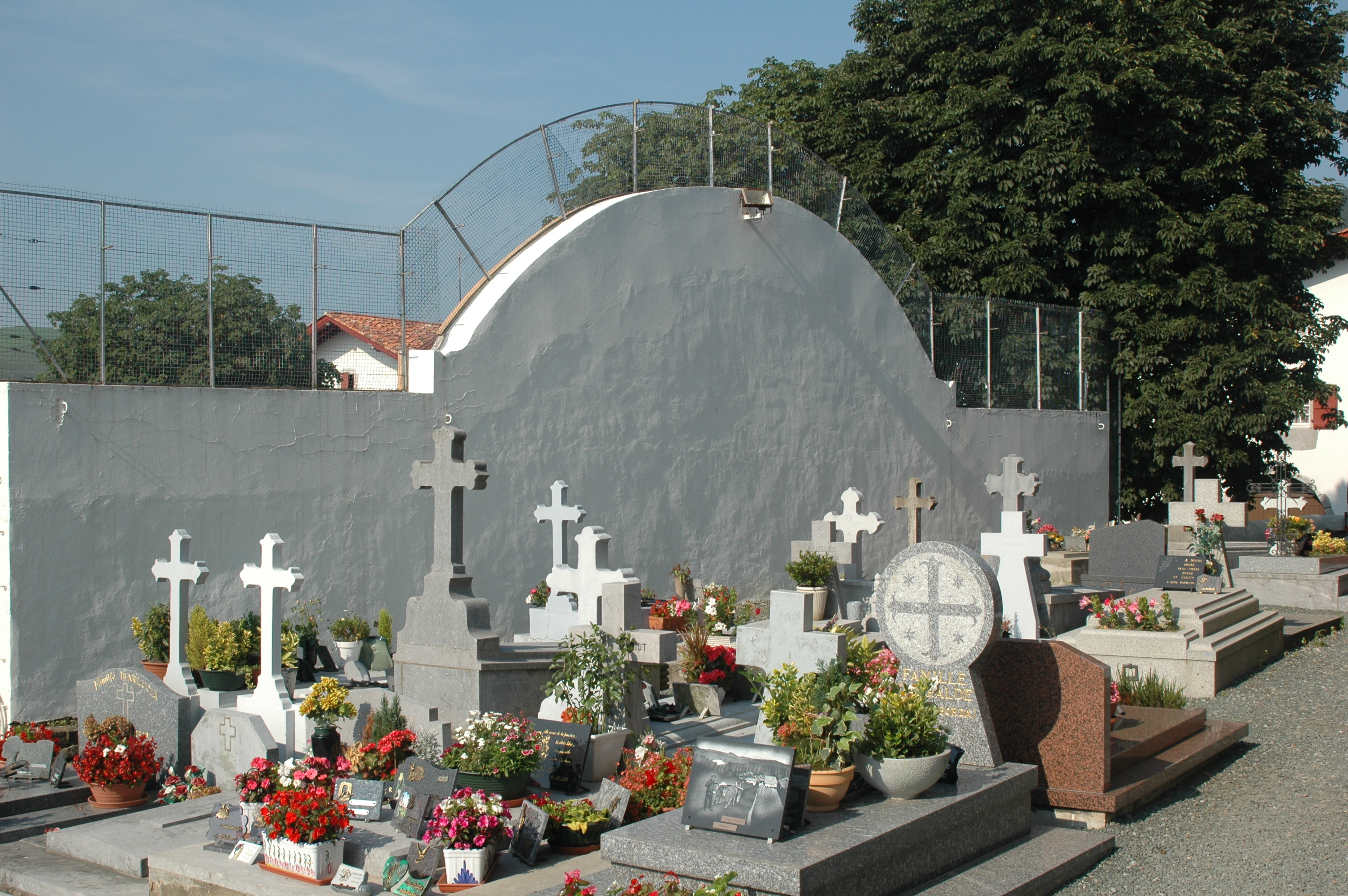
Cemetery

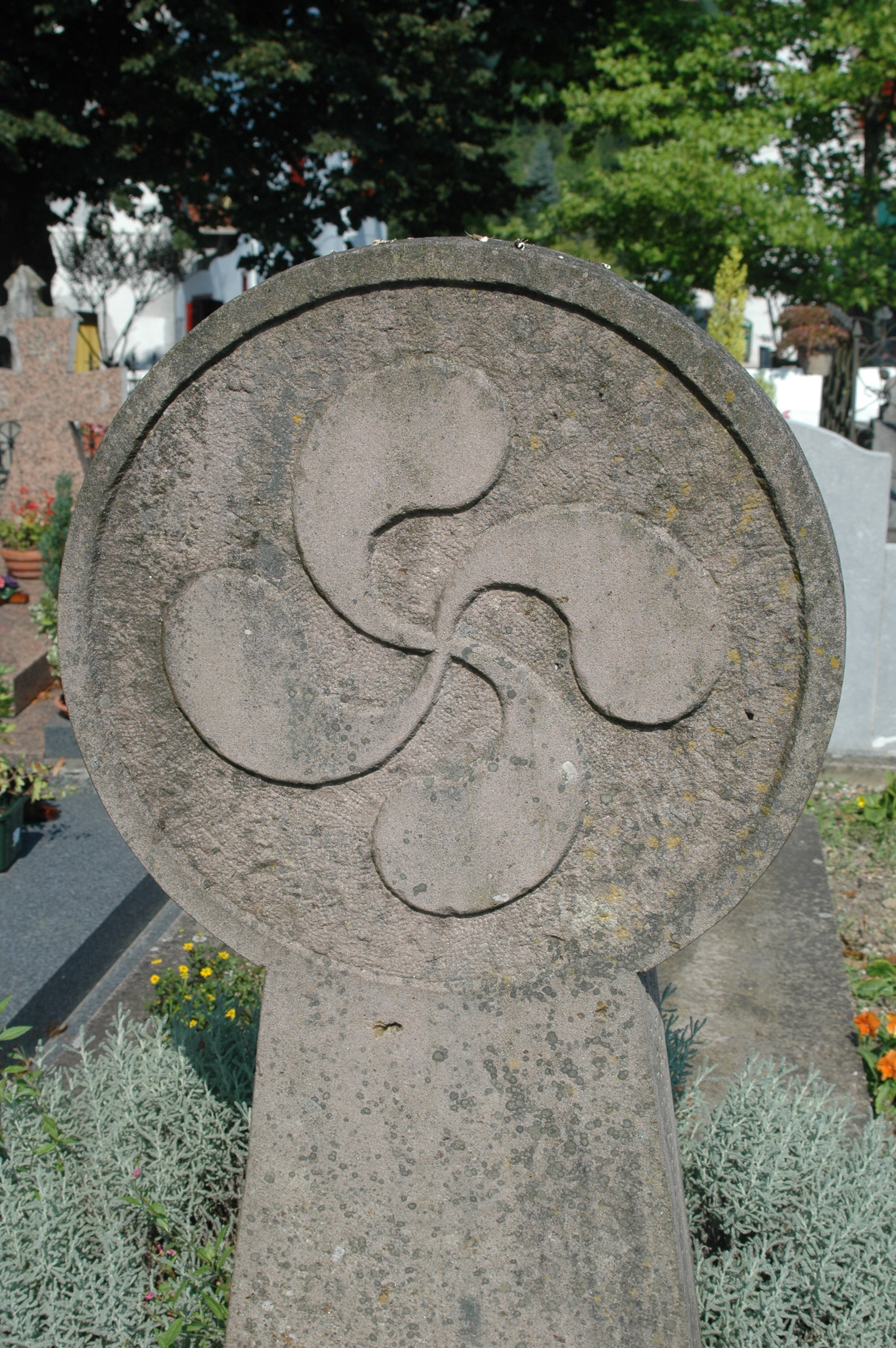
Headstone

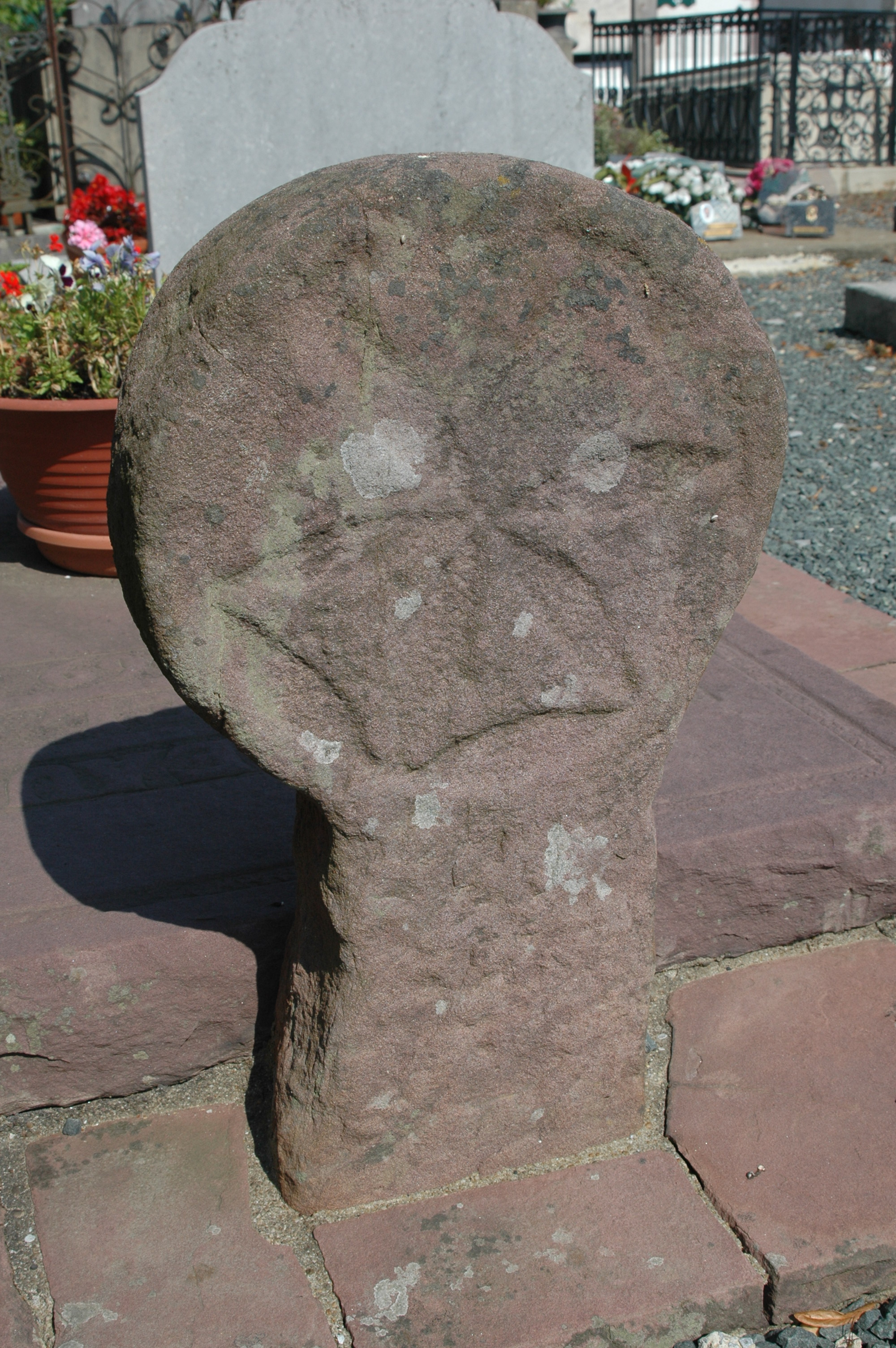
Headstone

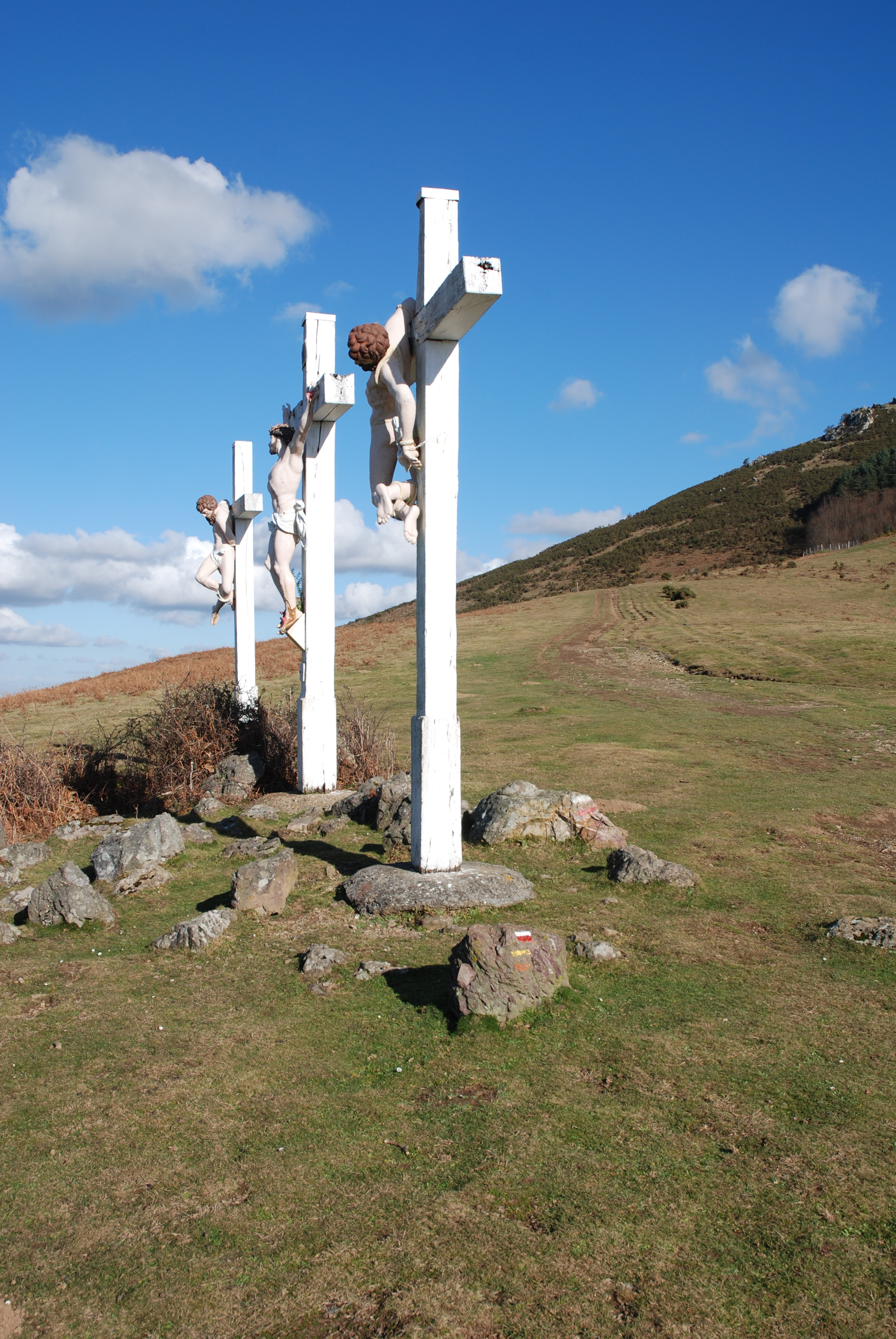
The Calvary dating to 1898

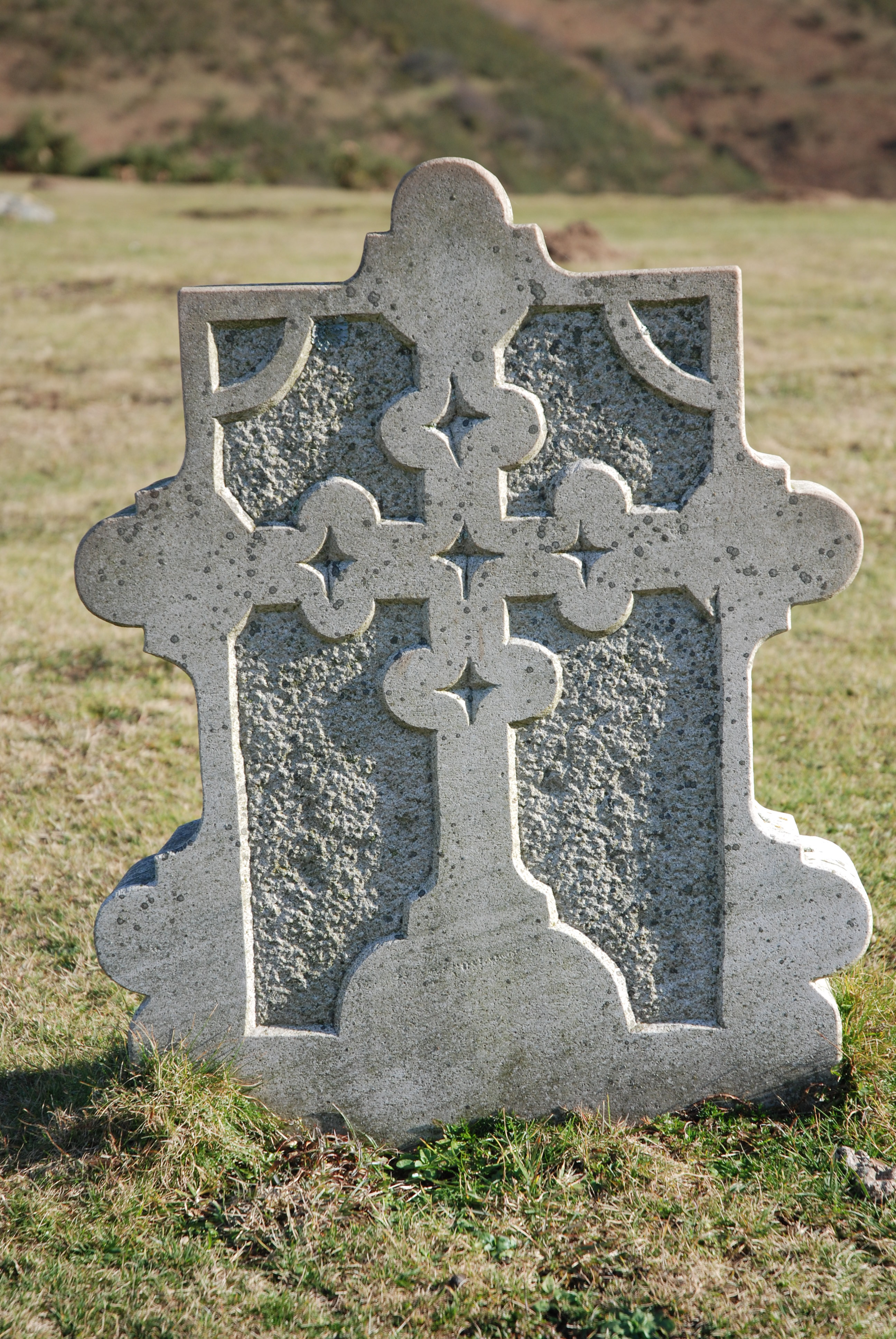
Rectangular Cross

=== Environmental heritage ===
Ainhoa Forest stretches over 400 hectares and is home to a rich fauna of both wild animals (deer, wild boar, hares, and migratory birds) and semi-wild pastoral animals (pottoks, "bestisos", and goats). The forest consists mainly of oak trees, rustic essence and newer vegetation such as red American oak and softwood).

== Facilities ==
=== Sports facilities ===
Pelota is played in the Fronton in the village and the covered fronton at Ur Hegian.

=== Education ===
The town has a public primary school.

=== Health ===
Two GPs are present in the town.

=== Notable people linked to the commune ===
- Jean-Pierre Duvoisin, born in 1810 at Ainhoa and died in 1891 at Ciboure was a Basque writer.

== See also ==
- Communes of the Pyrénées-Atlantiques department
