= Mondarrain =

Mountain in France

Coordinates: 43°18′10″N 1°25′56″W

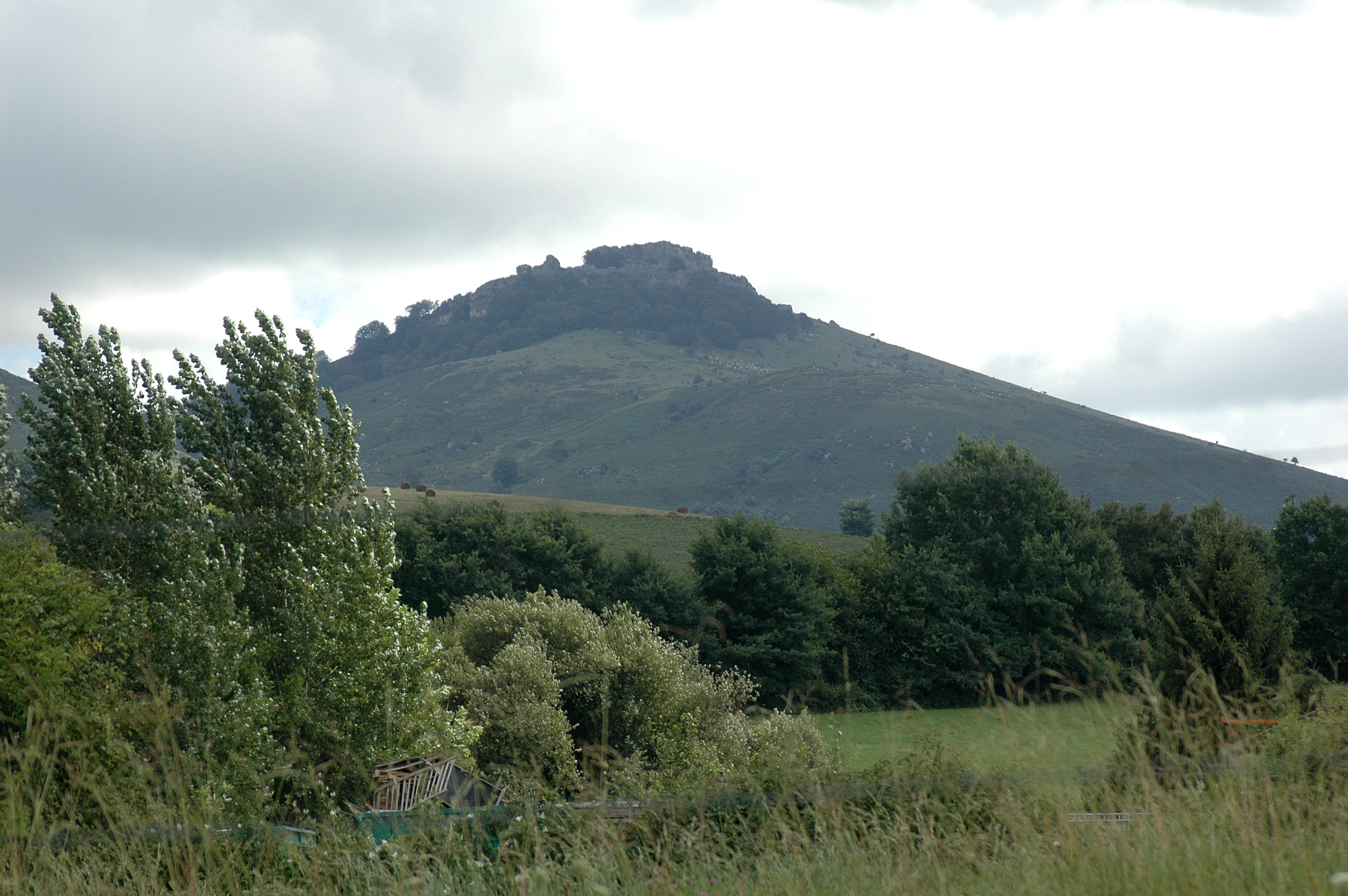
View of the Mondarrain from the village of Espelette

Mondarrain (French pronunciation: [mɔ̃daʁɛ̃]; Arranomendi in Basque) is a mountain in the French Basque Country, south of Espelette and south-west of Itxassou in the province of Labourd, peaking at 749 metres (2,457 ft) altitude.

To prevent Marquess of Wellington's army invading France in 1813, Marshal Soult built a line of fortifications and entrenchments along the river Nivelle from the sea inland to fortified rocks on Mount Mondarrain. The lines were breached during the Battle of Nivelle 10 November 1813.
