= Macaye =

Macaye Makea
- Commune
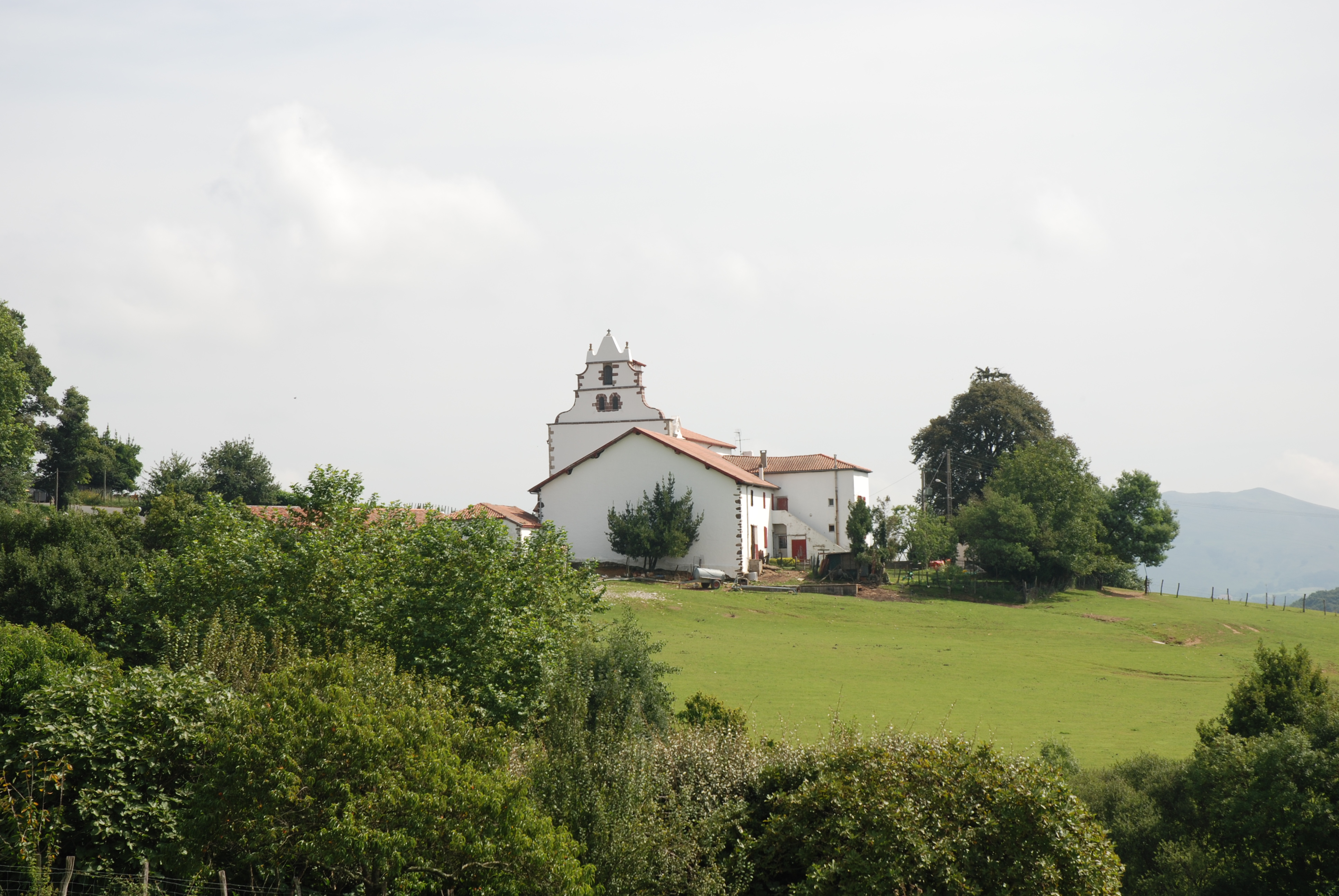
- The church of Macaye

- Coat of arms
- Location of Macaye
- Location within France Location within Nouvelle-Aquitaine
- Coordinates: 43°20′06″N 1°18′58″W
- Country: France
- Region: Nouvelle-Aquitaine
- Department: Pyrénées-Atlantiques
- Arrondissement: Bayonne
- Canton: Baïgura et Mondarrain
- Intercommunality: Pays Basque

Government
  - Mayor (2020–2026): Alain Dubois
- Area^{1}: 19.75 km^{2} (7.63 sq mi)
- Elevation: 218 m (715 ft)
- Highest elevation: 892 m (2,927 ft)
- Lowest elevation: 113 m (371 ft)
- Population (2023): 593
  - Density: 30.0/km^{2} (77.8/sq mi)
- Time zone: UTC+01:00 (CET)
  - Summer (DST): UTC+02:00 (CEST)
- INSEE/Postal code: 64364 /64240
- ^{1} French Land Register data, which excludes lakes, ponds, glaciers > 1 km^{2} (0.386 sq mi or 247 acres) and river estuaries.

Macaye (French pronunciation: [makaj]; Basque: Makea) is a commune in the Pyrénées-Atlantiques department in south-western France.

== Population ==
Historical population
Year	Pop.	±% p.a.
1968	512	—
1975	468	−1.28%
1982	463	−0.15%
1990	476	+0.35%
1999	529	+1.18%
2007	534	+0.12%
2012	542	+0.30%
2017	587	+1.61%
2023	593	+0.17%
Source: INSEE

== Geography ==
=== Neighboring communes ===
- Hasparren to the north
- Cambo-les-Bains to the north-west
- Mendionde to the east
- Louhossoa to the west
- Bidarray to the south

== See also ==
- Communes of the Pyrénées-Atlantiques department
