= Canton of Baïgura et Mondarrain =

Coordinates: 43.36°N 1.40°W

The canton of Baïgura et Mondarrain is an administrative division of the Pyrénées-Atlantiques department, southwestern France. It was created at the French canton reorganisation which came into effect in March 2015. Its seat is in Cambo-les-Bains.

It consists of the following communes:

1. Cambo-les-Bains
2. Espelette
3. Halsou
4. Hasparren
5. Itxassou
6. Jatxou
7. Larressore
8. Louhossoa
9. Macaye
10. Souraïde
