= Jatxou =

Jatxou Jatsu
- Commune
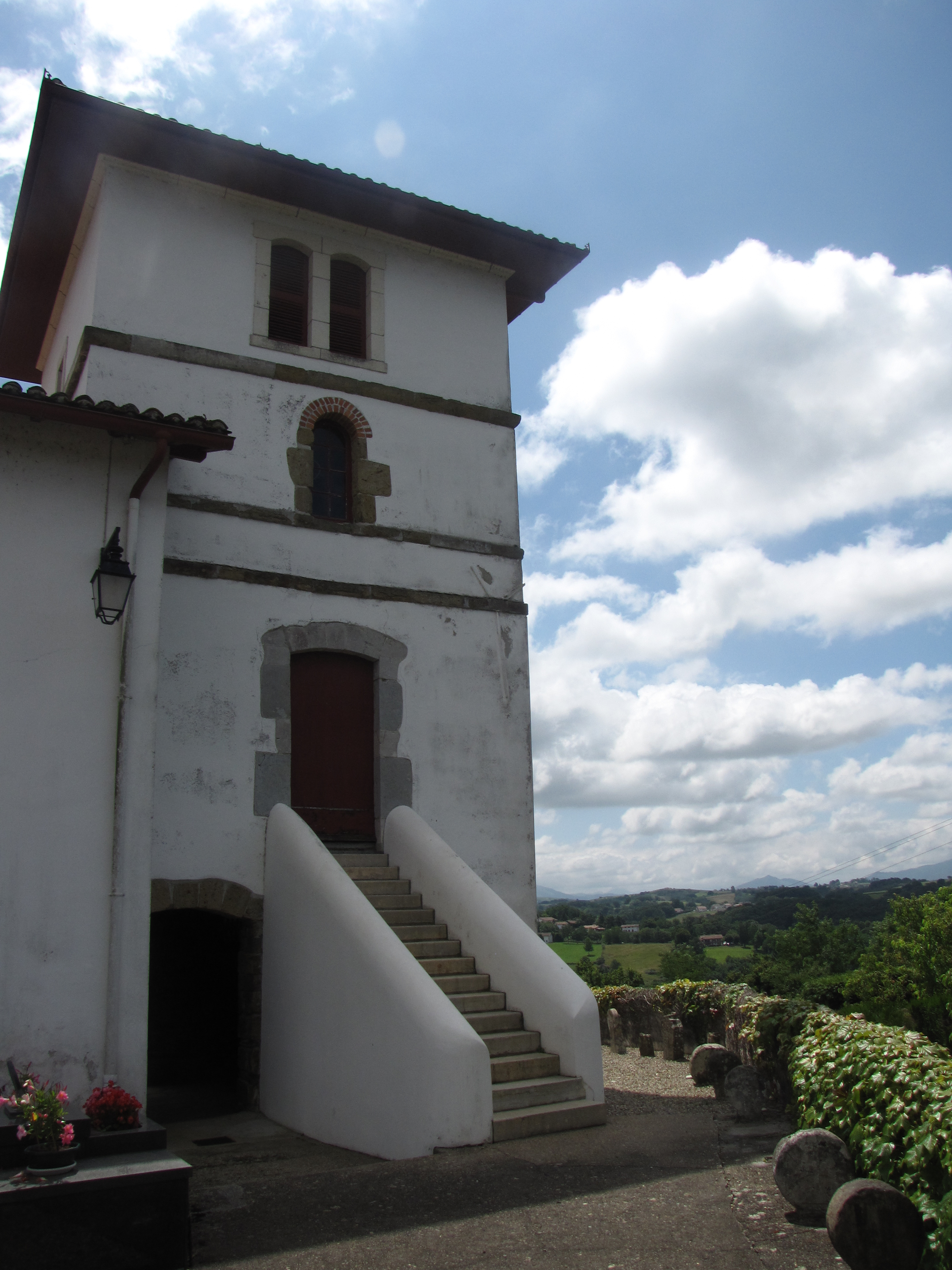
- The church of Saint Sébastien, in Jatxou
- Location of Jatxou
- Location within France Location within Nouvelle-Aquitaine
- Coordinates: 43°23′22″N 1°25′45″W
- Country: France
- Region: Nouvelle-Aquitaine
- Department: Pyrénées-Atlantiques
- Arrondissement: Bayonne
- Canton: Baïgura et Mondarrain
- Intercommunality: CA Pays Basque

Government
  - Mayor (2020–2026): Marc Labeguerie
- Area^{1}: 13.95 km^{2} (5.39 sq mi)
- Elevation: 79 m (259 ft)
- Highest elevation: 175 m (574 ft)
- Lowest elevation: 7 m (23 ft)
- Population (2023): 1,267
  - Density: 90.82/km^{2} (235.2/sq mi)
- Time zone: UTC+01:00 (CET)
  - Summer (DST): UTC+02:00 (CEST)
- INSEE/Postal code: 64282 /64480
- ^{1} French Land Register data, which excludes lakes, ponds, glaciers > 1 km^{2} (0.386 sq mi or 247 acres) and river estuaries.

Jatxou (French pronunciation: [ʒatsu]; Basque Jatsu) is a village and a commune in the Pyrénées-Atlantiques department in south-western France. It is part of the traditional Basque province of Labourd.

== See also ==
- Communes of the Pyrénées-Atlantiques department
