= Halsou =

Halsou Haltsu
- Commune
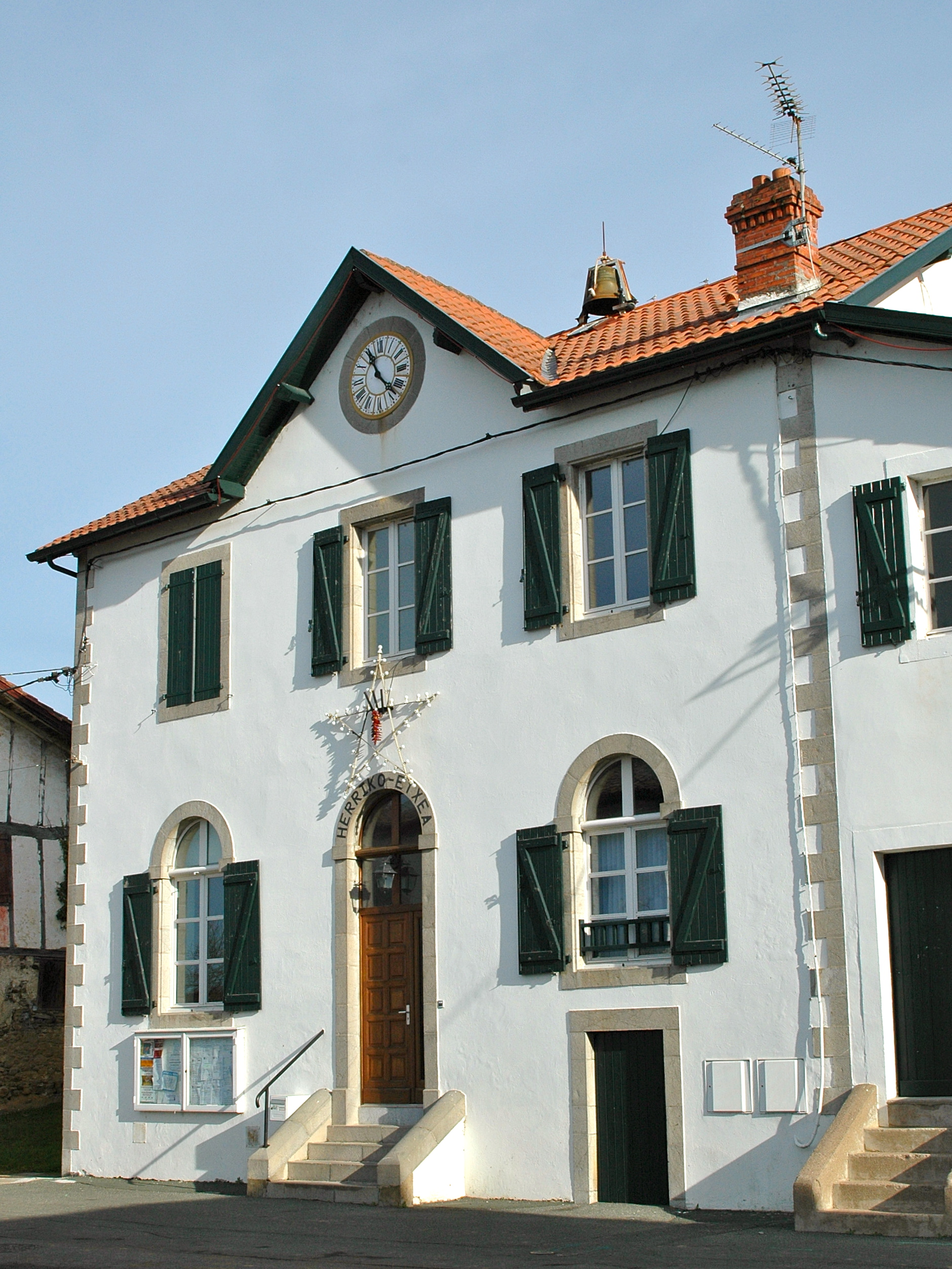
- The town hall of Halsou

- Coat of arms
- Location of Halsou
- Location within France Location within Nouvelle-Aquitaine
- Coordinates: 43°22′32″N 1°25′17″W
- Country: France
- Region: Nouvelle-Aquitaine
- Department: Pyrénées-Atlantiques
- Arrondissement: Bayonne
- Canton: Baïgura et Mondarrain
- Intercommunality: CA Pays Basque

Government
  - Mayor (2020–2026): Philippe Masse
- Area^{1}: 5.08 km^{2} (1.96 sq mi)
- Elevation: 62 m (203 ft)
- Highest elevation: 156 m (512 ft)
- Lowest elevation: 4 m (13 ft)
- Population (2023): 589
  - Density: 116/km^{2} (300/sq mi)
- Time zone: UTC+01:00 (CET)
  - Summer (DST): UTC+02:00 (CEST)
- INSEE/Postal code: 64255 /64480
- ^{1} French Land Register data, which excludes lakes, ponds, glaciers > 1 km^{2} (0.386 sq mi or 247 acres) and river estuaries.

Halsou (Occitan: Halson; Basque: Haltsu) is a commune in the Pyrénées-Atlantiques department in south-western France. Halsou-Larressore station has rail connections to Saint-Jean-Pied-de-Port, Cambo-les-Bains and Bayonne. The town's mayor is Philippe Masse, elected in 2020.

== See also ==
- Communes of the Pyrénées-Atlantiques department
