= Louhossoa =

Louhossoa Luhuso
- Commune
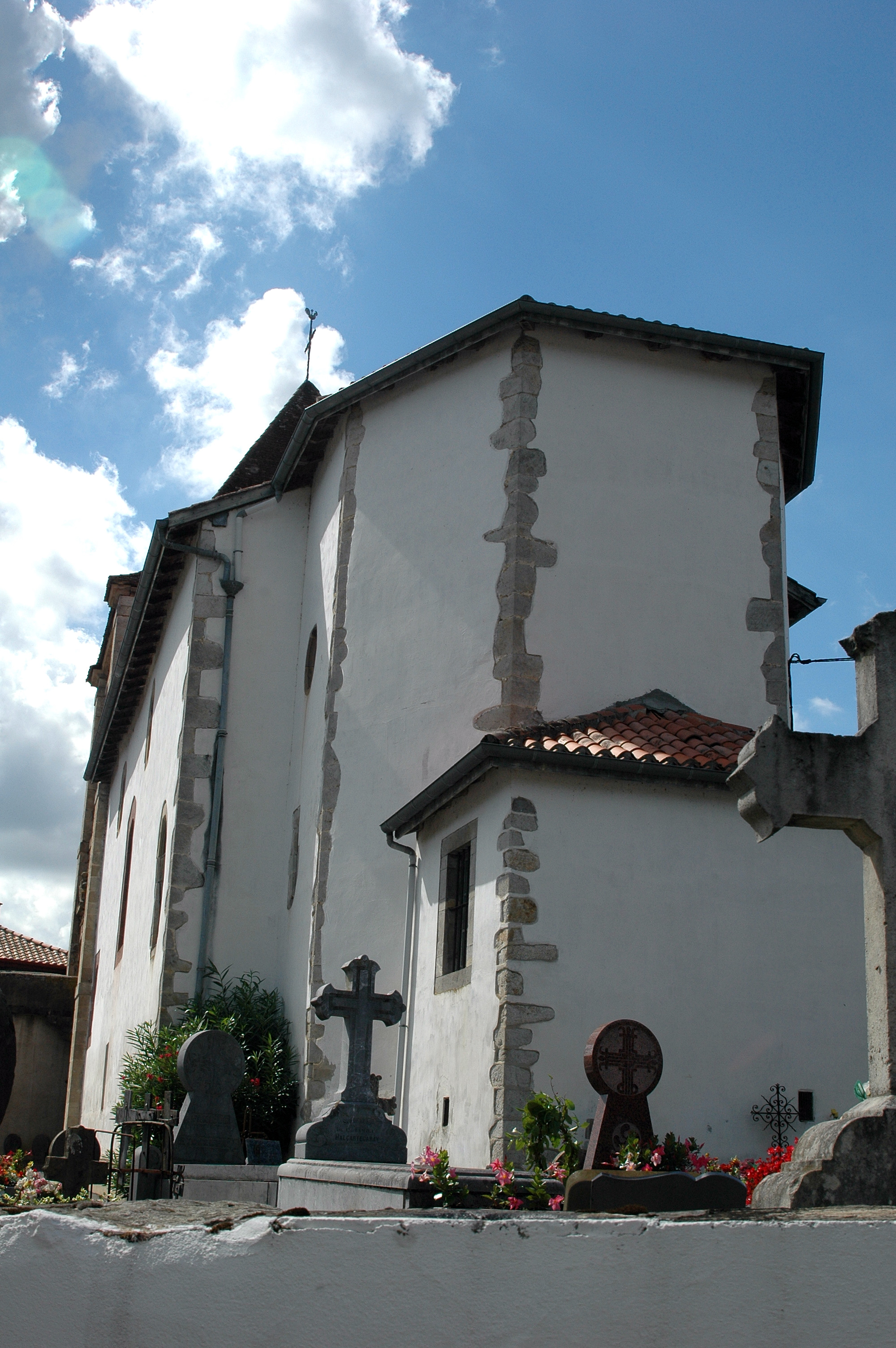
- The church of Louhossoa

- Coat of arms
- Location of Louhossoa
- Location within France Location within Nouvelle-Aquitaine
- Coordinates: 43°19′02″N 1°21′09″W
- Country: France
- Region: Nouvelle-Aquitaine
- Department: Pyrénées-Atlantiques
- Arrondissement: Bayonne
- Canton: Baïgura et Mondarrain
- Intercommunality: CA Pays Basque

Government
  - Mayor (2020–2026): Jean-Pierre Harriet
- Area^{1}: 7.38 km^{2} (2.85 sq mi)
- Elevation: 100 m (330 ft)
- Highest elevation: 369 m (1,211 ft)
- Lowest elevation: 71 m (233 ft)
- Population (2023): 886
  - Density: 120/km^{2} (311/sq mi)
- Time zone: UTC+01:00 (CET)
  - Summer (DST): UTC+02:00 (CEST)
- INSEE/Postal code: 64350 /64250
- ^{1} French Land Register data, which excludes lakes, ponds, glaciers > 1 km^{2} (0.386 sq mi or 247 acres) and river estuaries.

Louhossoa (French pronunciation: [lu.ɔsɔa]; Occitan: Luhòsa; Basque: Luhuso) is a small village and a commune in the Pyrénées-Atlantiques department in south-western France. It is part of the traditional Basque province of Labourd.

== See also ==
- Communes of the Pyrénées-Atlantiques department
