= Larressore =

Larressore Larresoro
- Commune
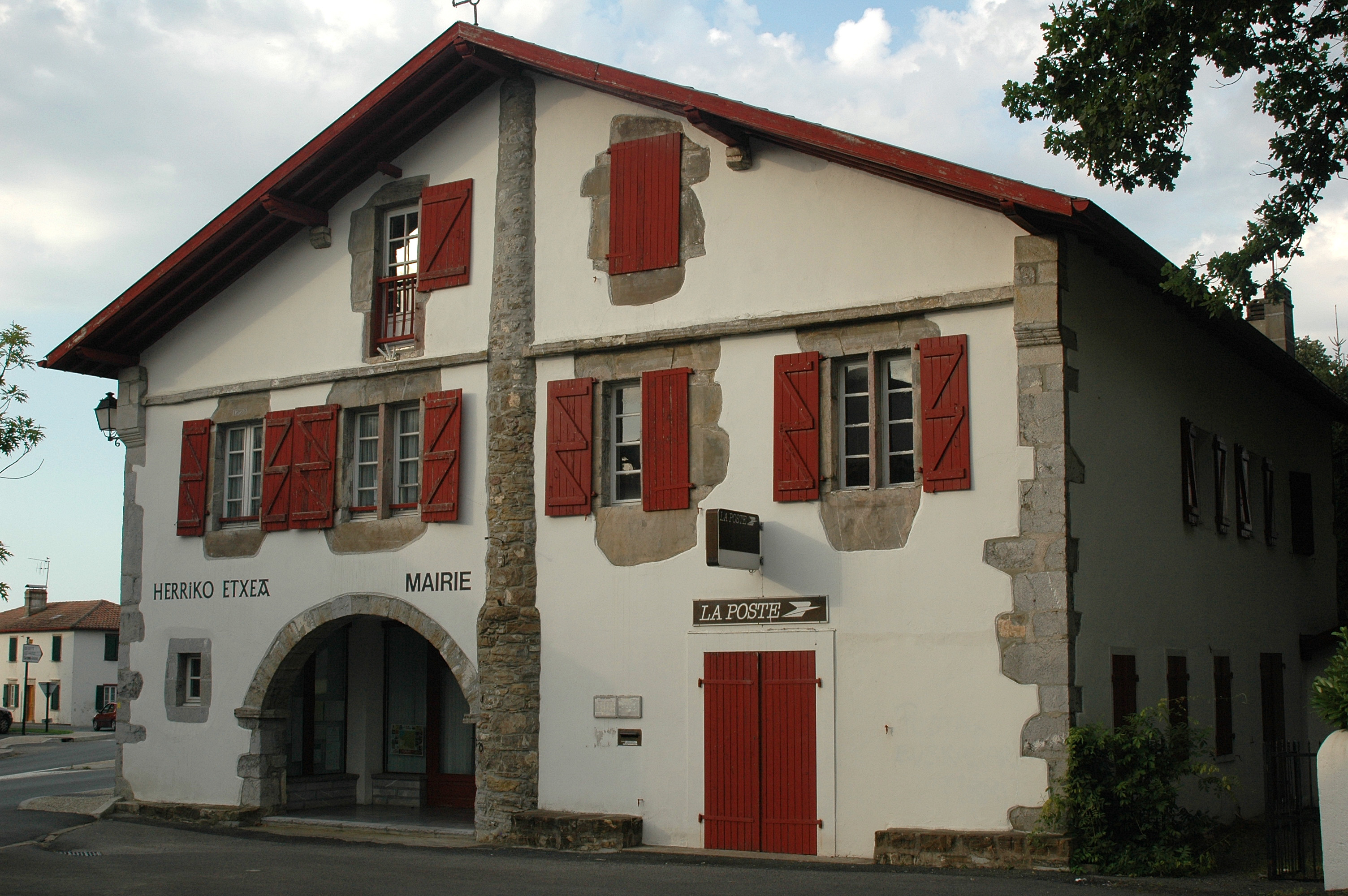
- The town hall and post office of Larressore
- Location of Larressore
- Location within France Location within Nouvelle-Aquitaine
- Coordinates: 43°22′17″N 1°26′16″W
- Country: France
- Region: Nouvelle-Aquitaine
- Department: Pyrénées-Atlantiques
- Arrondissement: Bayonne
- Canton: Baïgura et Mondarrain
- Intercommunality: CA Pays Basque

Government
  - Mayor (2020–2026): Laurence Samanos
- Area^{1}: 10.76 km^{2} (4.15 sq mi)
- Elevation: 60 m (200 ft)
- Highest elevation: 125 m (410 ft)
- Lowest elevation: 5 m (16 ft)
- Population (2023): 2,163
  - Density: 201.0/km^{2} (520.6/sq mi)
- Time zone: UTC+01:00 (CET)
  - Summer (DST): UTC+02:00 (CEST)
- INSEE/Postal code: 64317 /64480
- ^{1} French Land Register data, which excludes lakes, ponds, glaciers > 1 km^{2} (0.386 sq mi or 247 acres) and river estuaries.

Larressore (French pronunciation: [laʁəsɔʁ]; Occitan: Larressòri; Basque: Larresoro) is a commune in the Pyrénées-Atlantiques department in south-western France. It is in the traditional Basque province of Labourd.

== Population ==
Historical population
Year	Pop.	±% p.a.
1968	782	—
1975	940	+2.66%
1982	1,057	+1.69%
1990	1,148	+1.04%
1999	1,320	+1.56%
2007	1,456	+1.23%
2012	1,694	+3.07%
2017	2,053	+3.92%
2023	2,163	+0.87%
Source: INSEE

== See also ==
- Communes of the Pyrénées-Atlantiques department
