= Souraïde =

Souraïde Zuraide (Basque)
- Commune
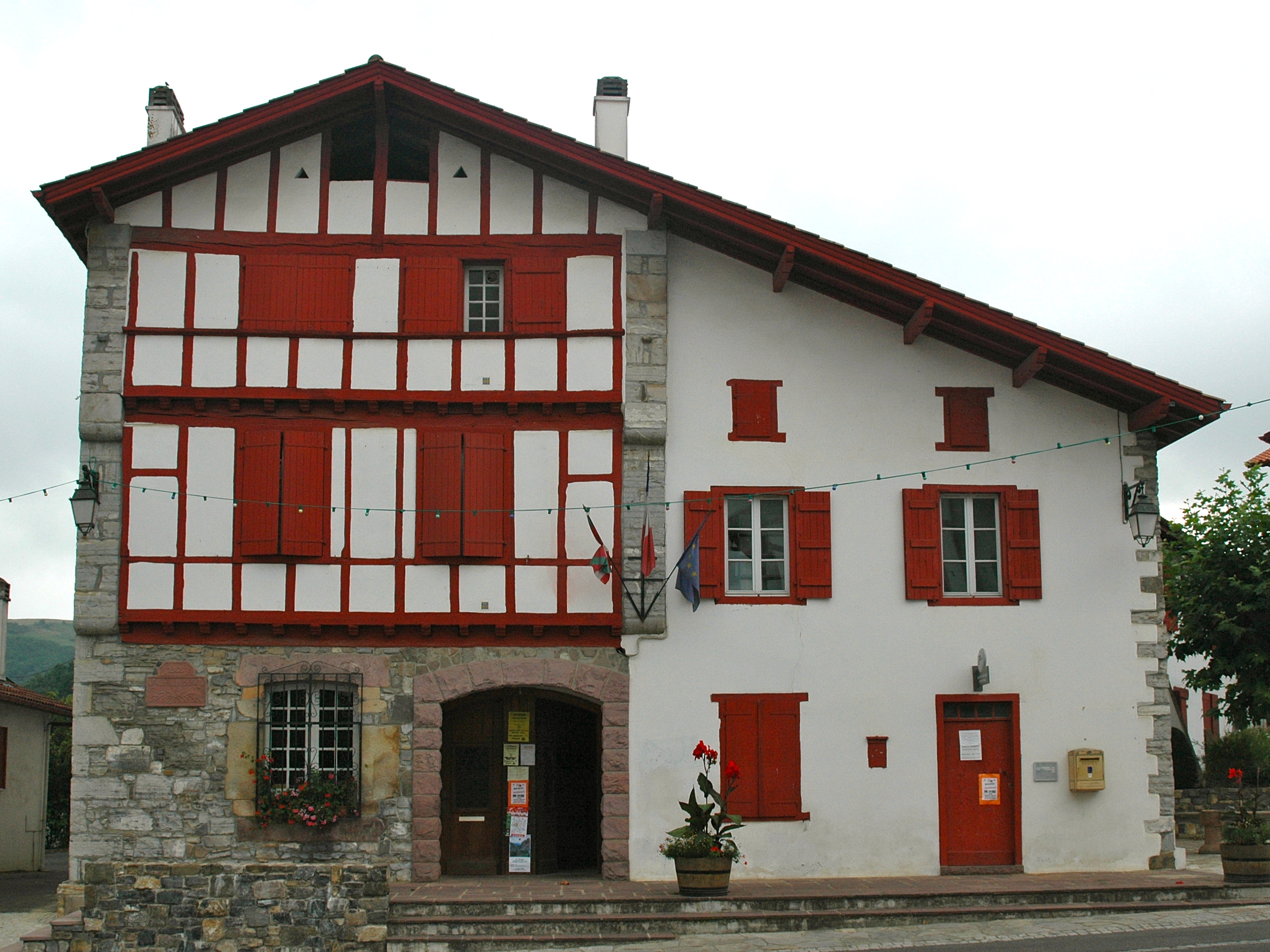
- The town hall of Souraïde
- Location of Souraïde
- Location within France Location within Nouvelle-Aquitaine
- Coordinates: 43°20′34″N 1°28′25″W
- Country: France
- Region: Nouvelle-Aquitaine
- Department: Pyrénées-Atlantiques
- Arrondissement: Bayonne
- Canton: Baïgura et Mondarrain
- Intercommunality: CA Pays Basque

Government
  - Mayor (2020–2026): Thierry Sansberro
- Area^{1}: 16.86 km^{2} (6.51 sq mi)
- Elevation: 94 m (308 ft)
- Highest elevation: 363 m (1,191 ft)
- Lowest elevation: 40 m (130 ft)
- Population (2023): 1,472
  - Density: 87.31/km^{2} (226.1/sq mi)
- Time zone: UTC+01:00 (CET)
  - Summer (DST): UTC+02:00 (CEST)
- INSEE/Postal code: 64527 /64250
- ^{1} French Land Register data, which excludes lakes, ponds, glaciers > 1 km^{2} (0.386 sq mi or 247 acres) and river estuaries.

Souraïde (French pronunciation: [suʁa.id]; Occitan: Sus la mesa; Basque: Zuraide) is a small village and a commune in the Pyrénées-Atlantiques department in south-western France. It is part of the traditional Basque province of Labourd.

== See also ==
- Communes of the Pyrénées-Atlantiques department
