= Espelette =

Espelette Ezpeleta
- Commune
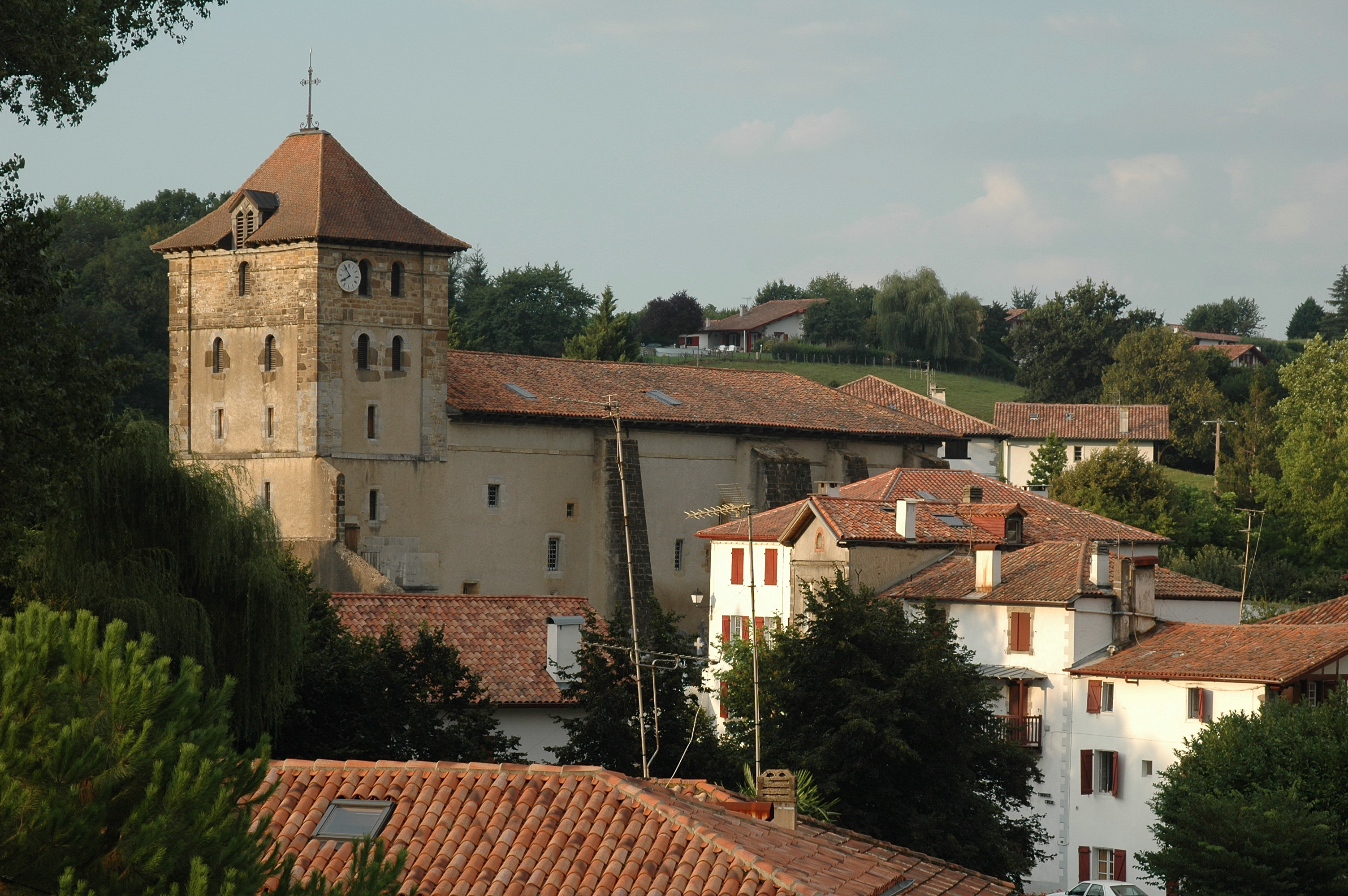
- The church of Saint-Étienne

- Coat of arms
- Location of Espelette
- Location within France Location within Nouvelle-Aquitaine
- Coordinates: 43°20′29″N 1°26′47″W
- Country: France
- Region: Nouvelle-Aquitaine
- Department: Pyrénées-Atlantiques
- Arrondissement: Bayonne
- Canton: Baïgura et Mondarrain
- Intercommunality: CA Pays Basque

Government
  - Mayor (2020–2026): Jean-Marie Iputcha
- Area^{1}: 26.85 km^{2} (10.37 sq mi)
- Elevation: 77 m (253 ft)
- Highest elevation: 749 m (2,457 ft)
- Lowest elevation: 33 m (108 ft)
- Population (2023): 2,155
  - Density: 80.26/km^{2} (207.9/sq mi)
- Time zone: UTC+01:00 (CET)
  - Summer (DST): UTC+02:00 (CEST)
- INSEE/Postal code: 64213 /64250
- ^{1} French Land Register data, which excludes lakes, ponds, glaciers > 1 km^{2} (0.386 sq mi or 247 acres) and river estuaries.

Espelette (French pronunciation: [ɛspəlɛt]; Basque: Ezpeleta; Occitan: Espeleta) is a commune in the Pyrénées-Atlantiques department in south-western France. It lies in the traditional Basque province of Labourd.

== Sights ==
The town is attractive, with traditional Labourd houses and a castle. The protected sixteenth-century church, Saint-Etienne, has a Baroque altarpiece, and its graveyard has many traditional Basque discoidal tombstones.

Espelette is a town located in Pyrénées-Atlantiques, in the Nouvelle-Aquitaine region of southwestern France. It stands near the Spanish border in the Navarre region of Spain. It sits approximately 122.4 kilometers from the capital of Pau, and is around 22 kilometers from Bayonne, a significant subprefecture in the region. Notably, Espelette is part of the Basque region on the French-Spanish border.

== Population ==
Historical population
Year	Pop.	±% p.a.
1968	1,258	—
1975	1,188	−0.81%
1982	1,411	+2.49%
1990	1,661	+2.06%
1999	1,879	+1.38%
2007	1,945	+0.43%
2012	2,038	+0.94%
2017	2,024	−0.14%
2023	2,155	+1.05%
Source: INSEE

== Notable people ==
- Agnès Souret, the first woman ever chosen as Miss France, in 1920, is buried in Espelette. She died in Argentina, aged 26, in 1928, and her body was repatriated to Espelette by her mother, who sold most of her possessions to provide a resting place for her daughter.
- Father Armand David (1826–1900), a Lazarist missionary Catholic priest as well as a zoologist and a botanist, was born in Espelette.

== Red peppers ==
Espelette is known for its dried red peppers, used whole or ground to a hot powder, used in the production of Bayonne ham. The peppers are designated as Appellation d'Origine Contrôlée and are hung to dry outside many of the houses and shops in the village during the summer. The peppers are sold in the town's Wednesday covered market and are honoured in a festival on the last Sunday in October.

== See also ==
- Communes of the Pyrénées-Atlantiques department
