= Cambo-les-Bains =

Cambo-les-Bains Kanbo
- Commune
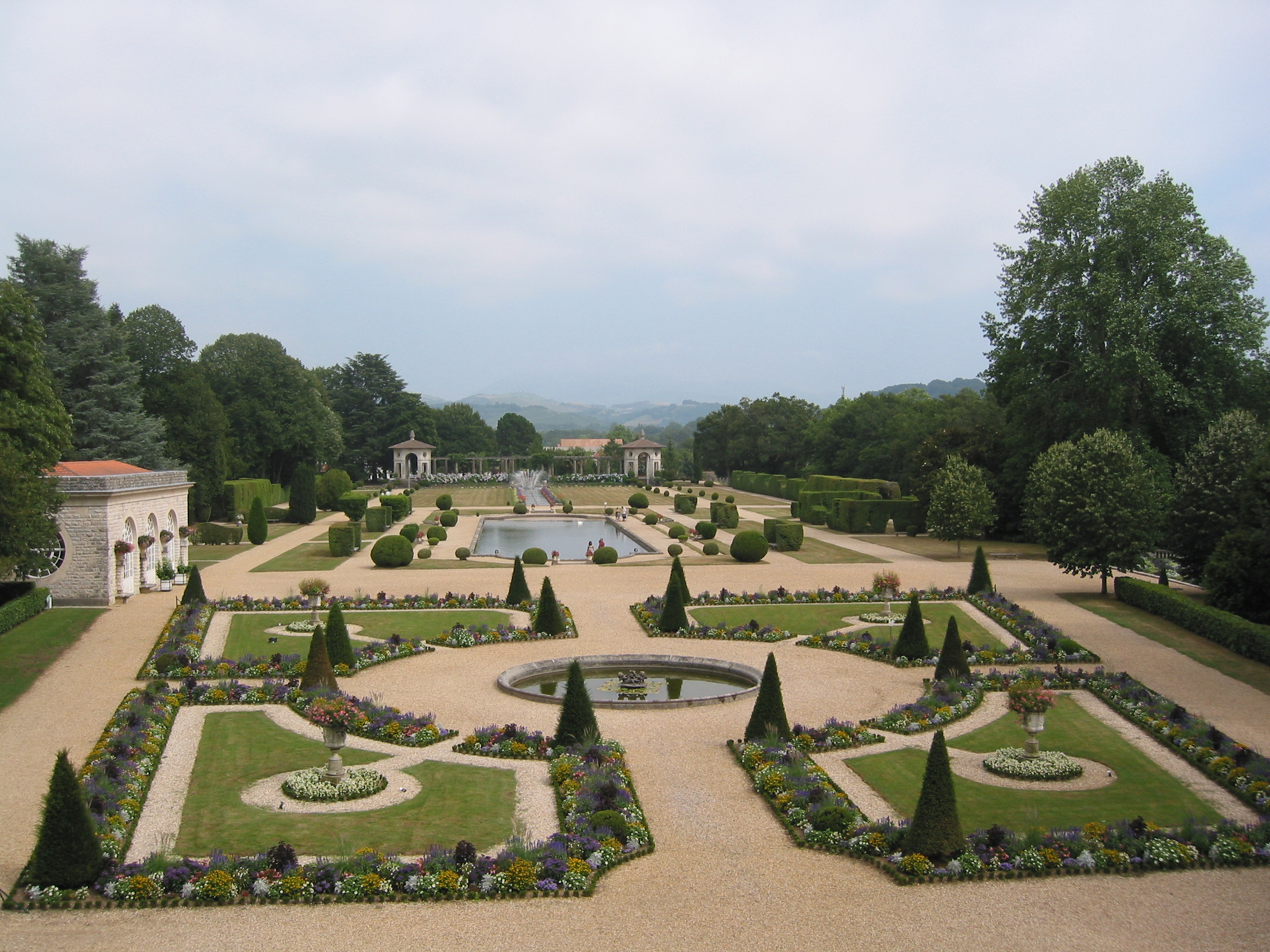
- Gardens of Arnaga

- Coat of arms
- Location of Cambo-les-Bains
- Location within France Location within Nouvelle-Aquitaine
- Coordinates: 43°21′32″N 1°24′01″W
- Country: France
- Region: Nouvelle-Aquitaine
- Department: Pyrénées-Atlantiques
- Arrondissement: Bayonne
- Canton: Baïgura et Mondarrain
- Intercommunality: CA Pays Basque

Government
  - Mayor (2020–2026): Christian Deveze
- Area^{1}: 22 km^{2} (8.5 sq mi)
- Elevation: 45 m (148 ft)
- Highest elevation: 400 m (1,300 ft)
- Lowest elevation: 0 m (0 ft)
- Population (2023): 6,760
  - Density: 310/km^{2} (800/sq mi)
- Time zone: UTC+01:00 (CET)
  - Summer (DST): UTC+02:00 (CEST)
- INSEE/Postal code: 64160 /64250
- ^{1} French Land Register data, which excludes lakes, ponds, glaciers > 1 km^{2} (0.386 sq mi or 247 acres) and river estuaries.

Cambo-les-Bains (French pronunciation: [kɑ̃bo le bɛ̃]; Occitan: Cambo-los-Bains; Basque: Kanbo) is a town in the traditional Basque province of Labourd, now in the Pyrénées-Atlantiques department in south-western France. It lies on the south-western bank of the river Nive. Cambo-les-Bains station has rail connections to Saint-Jean-Pied-de-Port and Bayonne.

== Population ==
Historical population
Year	Pop.	±% p.a.
1968	4,083	—
1975	4,146	+0.22%
1982	4,162	+0.06%
1990	4,128	−0.10%
1999	4,416	+0.75%
2007	5,849	+3.58%
2012	6,636	+2.56%
2017	6,551	−0.26%
2023	6,760	+0.52%
Source: INSEE

== People ==
In 1900, Edmond Rostand, writer of the play Cyrano de Bergerac, came to Cambo-les-Bains because of his pulmonary disease. He was taken by the area and in time bought some land and had a house built. It was completed in 1906. His house, the Villa Arnaga, is now a heritage site and a museum devoted to Rostand's life and Basque architecture and crafts.

The Spanish composer Isaac Albéniz died in Cambo-les-Bains in 1909 as well as another significant Spanish composer, Sebastián Durón, who died there in 1716. The French orientalist Jean Sauvaget died in Cambo in 1950. Musical instrument inventor Georges Jenny, who devised the Ondioline, died in Cambo-les-Bains in 1975.

Mixel Labéguerie, a doctor and key figure in Basque culture and politics after World War II lived in Cambo. He was elected mayor of the town for three terms as of 1965, and most notably he is credited as the father figure of the 1960s Basque musical revival. He was also a founding member of the Basque nationalist movement Embata. In 1980, his memorial service held in Cambo was attended by 4,000 people.

== Education ==
The commune has École maternelle Chantecler (a preschool), École élémentaire Curutxague, and Collège public Errobi (a junior high school). There are also the following private Francophone schools: École privée Sainte-Marie (an elementary school) and Collège privé Saint-Michel-Garicoïts (a junior high school). Additionally, the commune has the following private Basque language school: École primaire basque ikastola (an elementary school) and Collège ikastola Xalbador (a junior high school).

== See also ==
- Communes of the Pyrénées-Atlantiques department
