= Itxassou =

Itxassou Itsasu (Basque)
- Commune
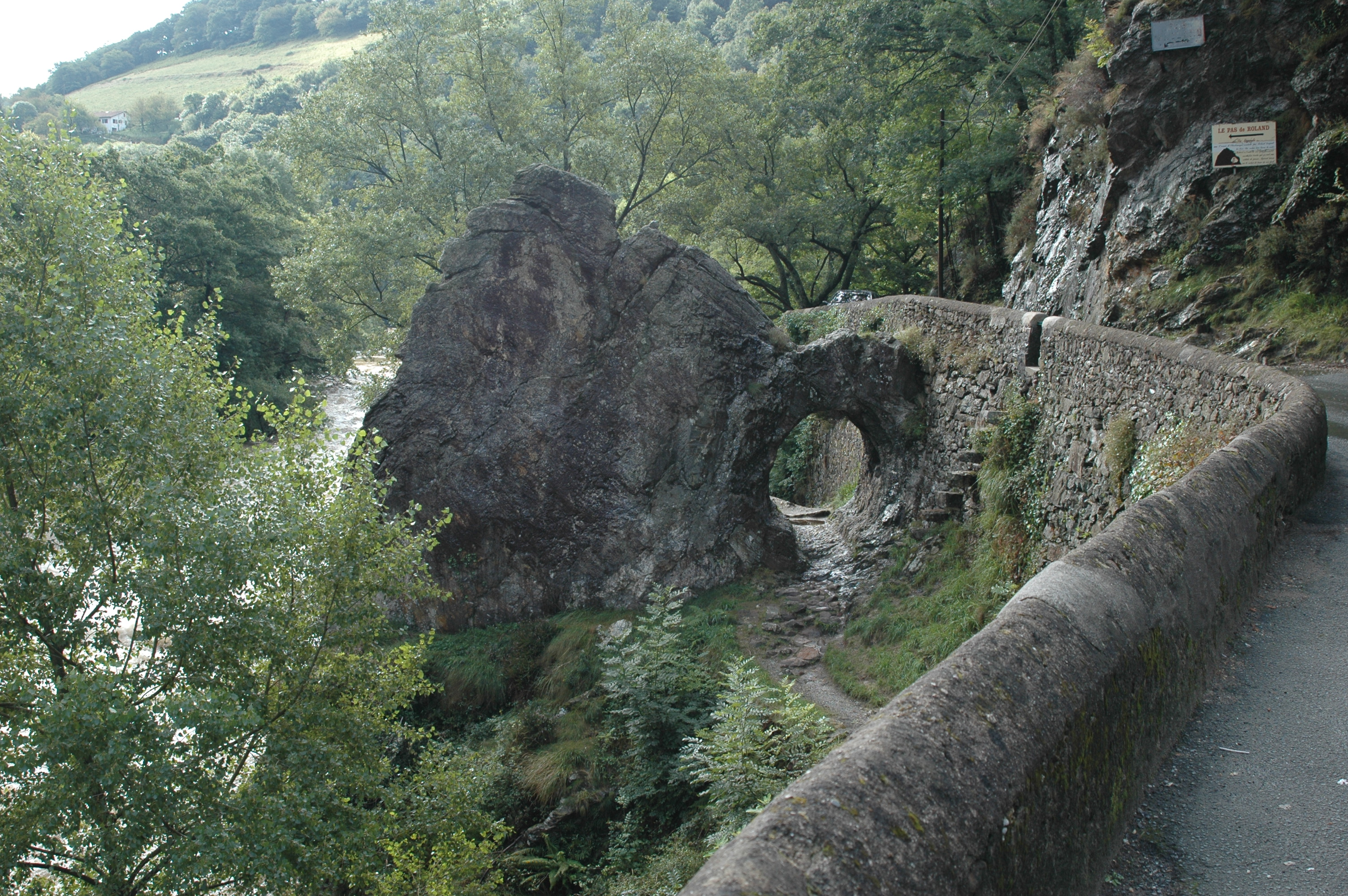
- Pas-de-Roland / Atekagaitz, alongside the Nive / Errobi

- Coat of arms
- Location of Itxassou
- Location within France Location within Nouvelle-Aquitaine
- Coordinates: 43°19′50″N 1°24′15″W
- Country: France
- Region: Nouvelle-Aquitaine
- Department: Pyrénées-Atlantiques
- Arrondissement: Bayonne
- Canton: Baïgura et Mondarrain
- Intercommunality: CA Pays Basque

Government
  - Mayor (2020–2026): Michel Hiribarren
- Area^{1}: 39.37 km^{2} (15.20 sq mi)
- Elevation: 39 m (128 ft)
- Highest elevation: 924 m (3,031 ft)
- Lowest elevation: 31 m (102 ft)
- Population (2023): 2,248
  - Density: 57.10/km^{2} (147.9/sq mi)
- Time zone: UTC+01:00 (CET)
  - Summer (DST): UTC+02:00 (CEST)
- INSEE/Postal code: 64279 /64250
- ^{1} French Land Register data, which excludes lakes, ponds, glaciers > 1 km^{2} (0.386 sq mi or 247 acres) and river estuaries.

Itxassou (French pronunciation: [itsasu]; Occitan: Itxasson; Basque Itsasu) is a village and a commune in the Northern Basque Country, in the Pyrénées-Atlantiques department, in south-western France. It is part of the traditional Basque province of Labourd.

== Population ==
Historical population
Year	Pop.	±% p.a.
1968	1,175	—
1975	1,218	+0.51%
1982	1,297	+0.90%
1990	1,563	+2.36%
1999	1,770	+1.39%
2007	1,998	+1.53%
2012	2,022	+0.24%
2017	2,133	+1.07%
2023	2,248	+0.88%
Source: INSEE

== See also ==
- Communes of the Pyrénées-Atlantiques department
