= Arbonne =

Arbonne Arbona
- Commune
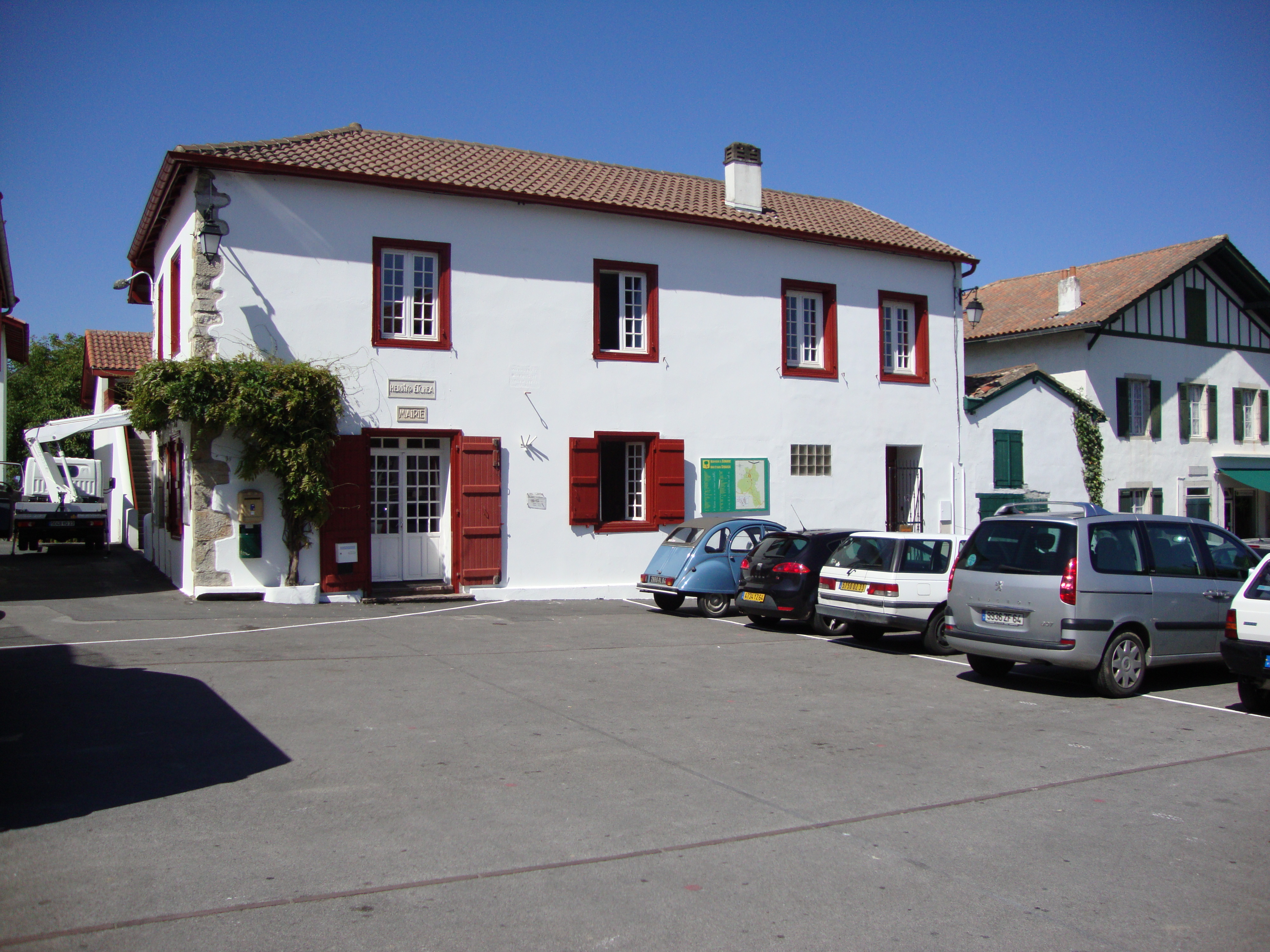
- The Town Hall

- Coat of arms
- Location of Arbonne
- Location within France Location within Nouvelle-Aquitaine
- Coordinates: 43°25′58″N 1°33′00″W
- Country: France
- Region: Nouvelle-Aquitaine
- Department: Pyrénées-Atlantiques
- Arrondissement: Bayonne
- Canton: Ustaritz-Vallées de Nive et Nivelle
- Intercommunality: CA Pays Basque

Government
  - Mayor (2021–2026): Marie-Josèphe Mialocq
- Area^{1}: 10.59 km^{2} (4.09 sq mi)
- Elevation: 21 m (69 ft)
- Highest elevation: 94 m (308 ft)
- Lowest elevation: 5 m (16 ft)
- Population (2023): 2,447
  - Density: 231.1/km^{2} (598.5/sq mi)
- Time zone: UTC+01:00 (CET)
  - Summer (DST): UTC+02:00 (CEST)
- INSEE/Postal code: 64035 /64210
- ^{1} French Land Register data, which excludes lakes, ponds, glaciers > 1 km^{2} (0.386 sq mi or 247 acres) and river estuaries.

Arbonne (French pronunciation: [aʁbɔn]; Occitan: Arbona; Basque: Arbona) is a commune in French Basque Country, a region of the Pyrénées-Atlantiques department in the Nouvelle-Aquitaine region of southwestern France.

== Geography ==
Arbonne is located some 6 km south of Biarritz and 3 km east of Bidart. It is part of the Urban area of Bayonne and is located in the former province of Labourd. Access to the commune is by road D255 from Biarritz in the north passing through the village and continuing south to Saint-Pée-sur-Nivelle. The D655 branches off the D255 in the south of the commune and goes to Ahetze. The A63 autoroute passes through the northern tip of the commune but has no access from the commune. In the south of the commune is the hamlet of Le Hameau d'Arbonne. The rest of the commune is mainly farmland with patches of forest especially in the north.

Located in the drainage basin of the Adour, the commune is traversed by the Uhabia, a small coastal river that flows into the ocean at Bidart, and its tributaries: the Zirikolatzeko erreka and the Ruisseau d'Argelos.

The Ruisseau de Pemartin also flows through the commune and there is an extensive network of streams throughout the commune.

=== Places and Hamlets ===
- Aguerrea
- Alhorga
- Allexarrea
- Arditegia
- Arretxea
- Berrueta
- Cassoua
- Diharzenea
- Etchardia
- Guichenea
- Gure Egoitza
- le Hameau d'Arbonne
- Harriague
- Hegoasea
- Katalienea
- Kuttuenea
- Larreburua
- Magnienea
- Menta
- Mestelan Beherea
- Mestelania
- Moleresia
- Mundustenea
- Pemartikoborda
- Pemartin
- Perukain
- La Place
- le Pouy
- Saskoenea
- Tribulenea
- Xantxienea
- Xokobia
- Ziburria
- Ziburriako Errota

== Toponymy ==
The commune name in Basque is Arbona.

Brigitte Jobbé-Duval indicated that 'Arbona meant "place of tree stumps".

The following table details the origins of the commune name and other names in the commune.

Name	Spelling	Date	Source	Page	Origin	Description
Arbonne	Narbona	1186	Raymond	9	Bayonne	Village
	Narbone	1349	Orpustan			
Alhorgako Erreka	L'Alhorga	1863	Raymond	5		A tributary of the Uhabia flowing from Saint-Pée-sur-Nivelle and Ahetze
Berrueta	Berhouetta	1863	Raymond	28		Farm
Harriague	Harriague	1863	Raymond	76		Hamlet
Hurmalague	Hurmalague	1863	Raymond	80		Hamlet
Menta	Menta	1198	Raymond	112	Bayonne	Hamlet
	Mente	1523	Raymond	112	Chapter	
Mestelan Beherea	Mestelan	1760	Raymond	112	Collations	Farm (a prebend of this name was present in the Arbonne church)
	Mesthelan	1863	Raymond	112		
Pemartin	Pémartin	1863	Raymond	133		Farm
Perukain	Perucam	13th century	Raymond	134	Bayonne	Hamlet
	Pérucain	1863	Raymond			
La Place	La Place	1863	Raymond	135		Hamlet
Le Pouy	la chapelle de Pouy près Bayonne	1751	Raymond	139	Intendance	Farm
	Pouy	1863	Raymond	139		

Sources:

- Raymond: Topographic Dictionary of the Department of Basses-Pyrenees, 1863, on the page numbers indicated in the table. (in French)

Origins:

- Bayonne: Cartulary of Bayonne or Livre d'Or (Book of Gold)
- Collations: Collations of the Diocese of Bayonne
- Chapter: Titles of the Chapter of Bayonne
- Intendance: Intendance of Pau

== History ==
The oldest lord of Arbonne whose names are known are from the Sault family, Viscounts of Labourd. At the end of the 14th century the lordship was owned by the Saint-Julien family (originally from Lower Navarre) and then in 1408 to the Amezqueta family.

The Act of 4 March 1790, which determined the new administrative landscape of France by creating departments and districts, created the Department of Basses-Pyrénées to bring together Béarn, the Gascon lands in Bayonne and Bidache, and three French Basque provinces. For these three provinces three districts were created: Mauléon, Saint-Palais, and Ustaritz which replaced the Bailiwick of Labourd. The seat of Ustaritz was transferred almost immediately to Bayonne. Its Directorate pushed many municipalities into adopting new names conforming to the spirit of the Revolution. Arbonne was called Constante, Ustaritz became Marat-sur-Nive, Itxassou Union, Saint-Étienne-de-Baïgorry Thermopyles, Saint-Palais Mont-Bidouze, Saint-Jean-Pied-de-Port Nive-Franche, Louhossoa Montagne-sur-Nive, Saint-Jean-de-Luz Chauvin-Dragon, Ainhoa Mendiarte, and Souraïde Mendialde.

=== Heraldry ===
Arms of Arbonne	Adopted by the Town Council on 20 May 1988. Blazon: Or, a Tauzin oak Vert accompanied at sinister by a bear Sable attached to the trunk of the tree and at dexter two nails of Sable posed in chevron inverted.

== Administration ==
List of Successive Mayors

Mayors from the French Revolution to 1943

From	To	Name
1790?	1794	Daguerre
1794	1795	Dominique Duhart (Mayor of Constante which united Arbonne, Arcangues, and Bassussarry)
1795		Jean Laborde (Mayor of Constante)
1814	1817	Pierre Landaboure
1817	1822	Jean Diharce
1822	1823	Martin Hegoas
1823	1827	Charles Borotra
1827	1840	Mathieu Duhart
1840	1842	Hirigoyen
1842	1849	Doyhenard
1849	1859	Laborde
1859	1864	Michel Dokhelar
1864	1876	Laurent Hirigoyen
1876	1881	Jean Dufau
1881	1896	Jean Borotra
1896	1904	Jean Dufau
1904	1943	Bernard Housset

Mayors from 1943

From	To	Name
1943	1945	Jean Hegoas
1945	1948	Émile Martin
1953	1971	André Gromard
1971	1977	Didier Borotra
1977	1995	Bernard Abeberry
1995	2008	Jean Bareille
2008	2026	Marie-Josèphe Mialocq

=== Inter-communality ===
Arbonne is part of nine inter-communal structures:

- the Communauté d'agglomération du Pays Basque;
- the SIVOM of Arbonne-Arcangues-Bassussarry;
- the SIVU of Arbonne-Bidart;
- the Ouhabia association;
- the mixed association of Bizi Garbia;
- the Association for promotion of basque culture;
- the mixed association for management of Ura drinking water;
- the mixed association for sanitation in Ura;
- the Energy association of Pyrénées-Atlantiques.

The commune is part of the Eurocité basque Bayonne-San Sebastian (fr) (a cross-border association to develop the area from Bayonne in France to San Sebastian in Spain).

== Demography ==
The inhabitants of the commune are known as Arbonars in French.

Historical population

Year	Pop.	±% p.a.
1793	608	—
1800	555	−1.29%
1806	560	+0.15%
1821	520	−0.49%
1831	690	+2.87%
1836	745	+1.55%
1841	715	−0.82%
1846	708	−0.20%
1851	700	−0.23%
1856	685	−0.43%
1861	700	+0.43%
1866	705	+0.14%
1872	733	+0.65%
1876	724	−0.31%
1881	790	+1.76%
1886	800	+0.25%
1891	770	−0.76%
1896	759	−0.29%
1901	764	+0.13%

Year	Pop.	±% p.a.
1906	789	+0.65%
1911	788	−0.03%
1921	689	−1.33%
1926	763	+2.06%
1931	866	+2.56%
1936	980	+2.50%
1946	763	−2.47%
1954	614	−2.68%
1962	628	+0.28%
1968	648	+0.52%
1975	819	+3.40%
1982	1,196	+5.56%
1990	1,366	+1.68%
1999	1,375	+0.07%
2007	1,855	+3.81%
2012	2,075	+2.27%
2017	2,223	+1.39%
2023	2,447	+1.61%

Source: EHESS and INSEE

== Economy ==
The commune is part of the Appellation d'origine contrôlée (AOC) zone of Ossau-iraty.

== Culture and heritage ==
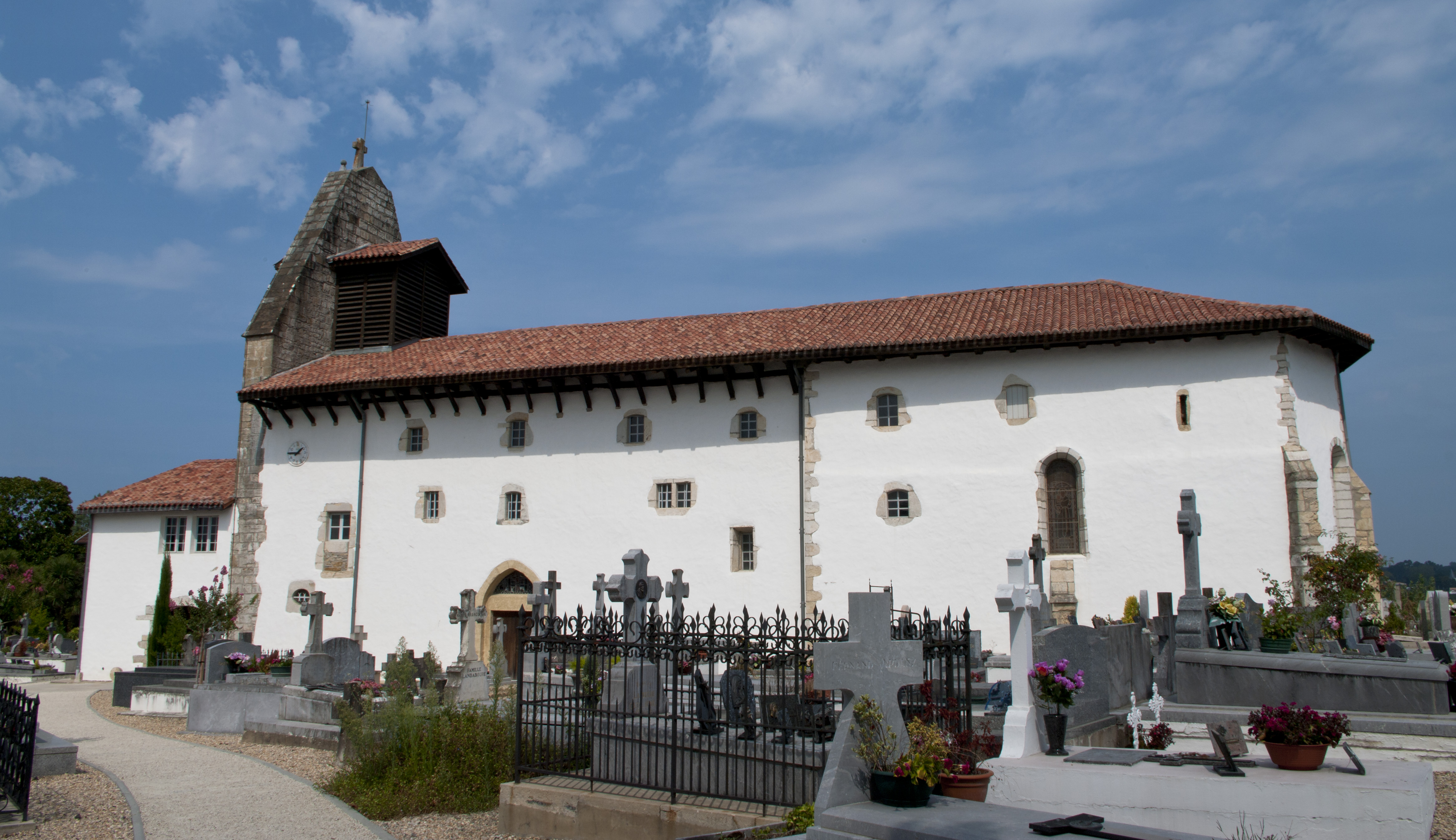
The Church of Saint-Laurent

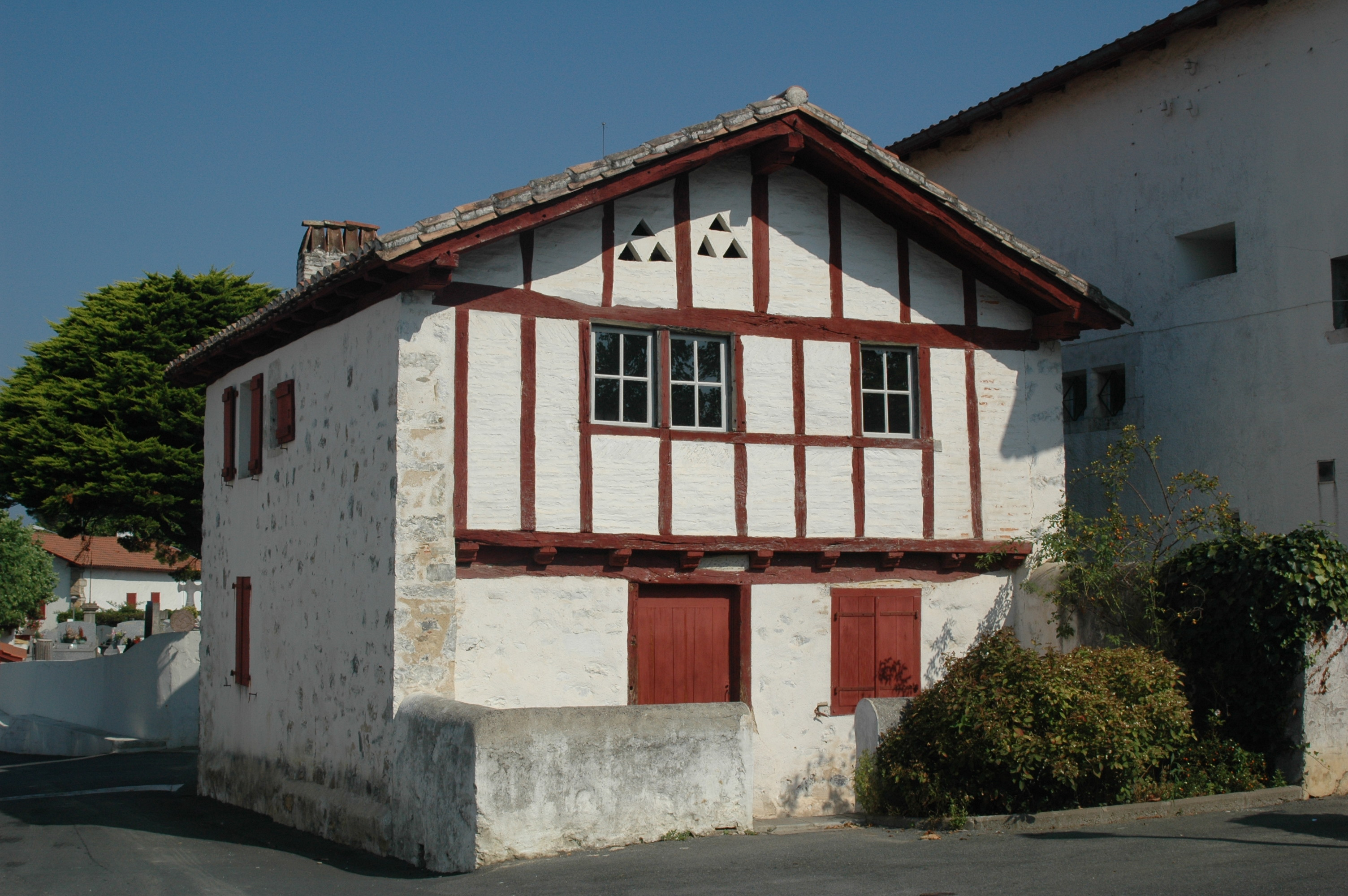
The old benoîterie

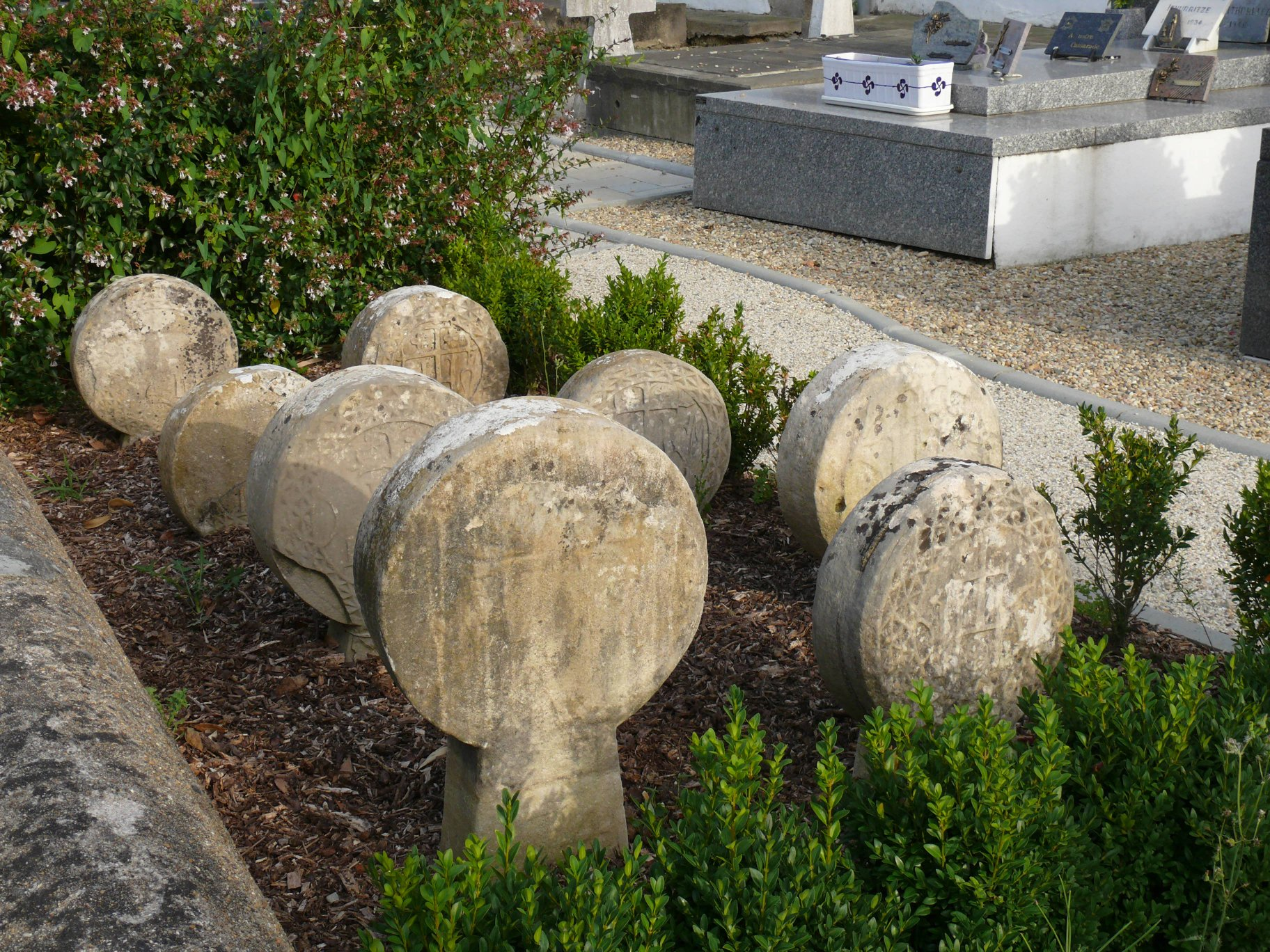
Old Hilarri in the cemetery

According to the Map of the Seven Basque Provinces by Prince Louis-Lucien Bonaparte the basque dialect spoken in Arbonne is northern Upper Navarrese

=== Religious heritage ===
The commune has two buildings that are registered as historical monuments:

- The Church of Saint-Laurent (12th century). It is of a medium size with an arched Bell-gable characteristic of Labourd religious buildings. Some old Hilarri are visible in the cemetery.
- The old Benoîterie d'Arbonne (16th century) The Benoîterie was the residence of the Benoîte or guardian of the church and cemetery and is now the venue for exhibitions (paintings, crafts).

== Facilities ==
Health

The commune has a general practitioner, three nurses, a speech therapist, a physiotherapist, and a dentist - all in the village centre.

Education

Arbonne has two primary schools, one public and one private (Saint-Laurent school)

== Notable people linked to the commune ==
- Jean Borotra - called the Basque bondissant (the Bounding Basque), born in 1898 at Biarritz and died in 1994 at Arbonne, a tennis player and French politician
- Bernard Béreau, born in 1940 at Arbonne and died in 2005, he was a French footballer
- Marie-Michèle Beaufils, born in 1949 at Arbonne, she is a contemporary writer

== See also ==
- Communes of the Pyrénées-Atlantiques department

=== Bibliography ===
- Arbonne, Arbona, Collective work under the direction of Hubert Lamant-Duhart, Ekaina, 1988 (in French)
