= Bassussarry =

Bassussarry Basusarri
- Commune
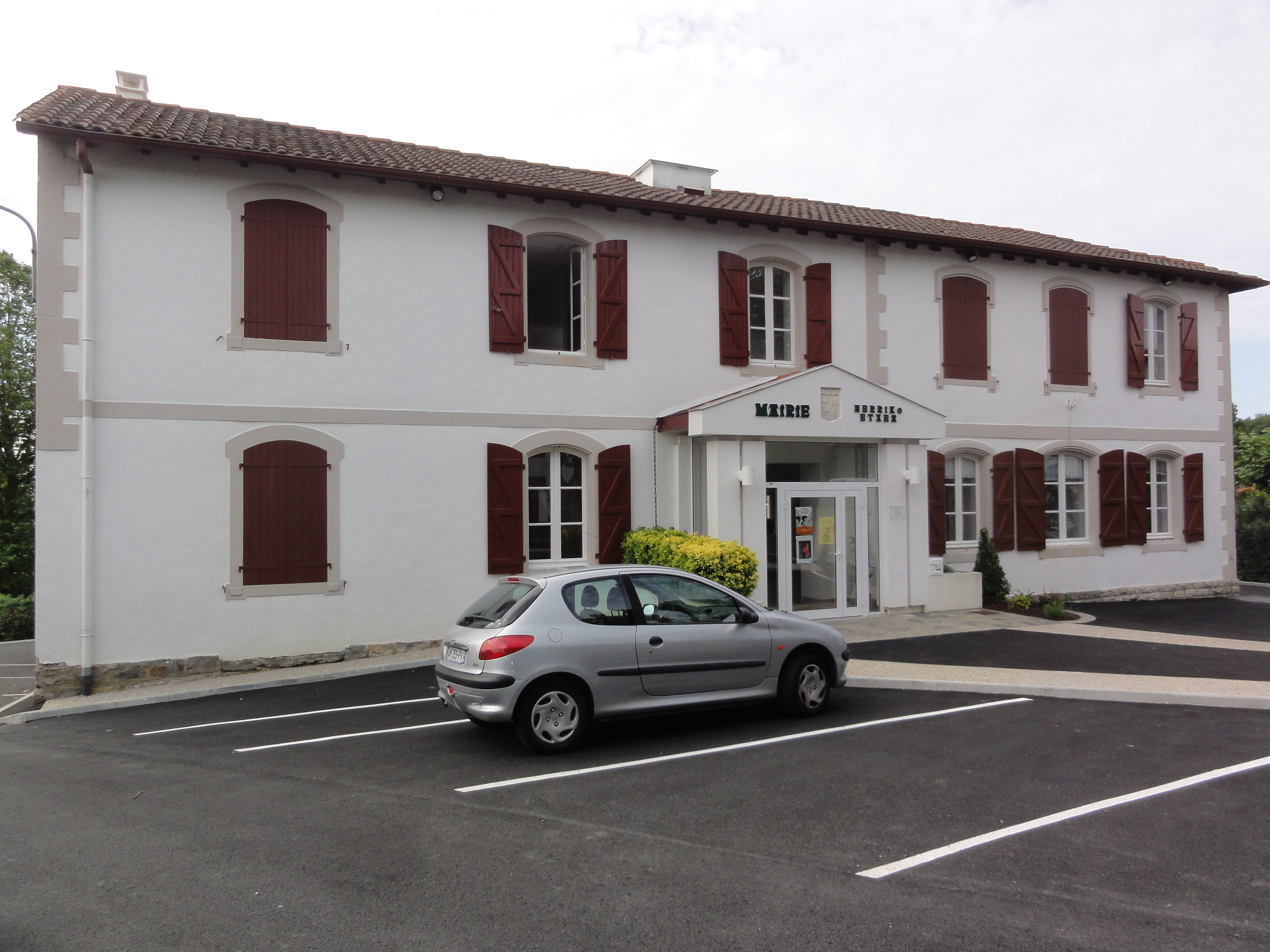
- Town hall

- Coat of arms
- Location of Bassussarry
- Location within France Location within Nouvelle-Aquitaine
- Coordinates: 43°26′50″N 1°30′38″W
- Country: France
- Region: Nouvelle-Aquitaine
- Department: Pyrénées-Atlantiques
- Arrondissement: Bayonne
- Canton: Ustaritz-Vallées de Nive et Nivelle
- Intercommunality: CA Pays Basque

Government
  - Mayor (2020–2026): Michel Lahorgue
- Area^{1}: 7 km^{2} (2.7 sq mi)
- Elevation: 8 m (26 ft)
- Highest elevation: 85 m (279 ft)
- Lowest elevation: 2 m (6.6 ft)
- Population (2023): 3,414
  - Density: 490/km^{2} (1,300/sq mi)
- Time zone: UTC+01:00 (CET)
  - Summer (DST): UTC+02:00 (CEST)
- INSEE/Postal code: 64100 /64200
- ^{1} French Land Register data, which excludes lakes, ponds, glaciers > 1 km^{2} (0.386 sq mi or 247 acres) and river estuaries.

Bassussarry (French pronunciation: [basysaʁi]; Occitan: Bassussari; Basque: Basusarri) is a commune in the Pyrénées-Atlantiques department in the Nouvelle-Aquitaine region of southwestern France.

The inhabitants of the commune are known as Basusartars.

== Geography ==
Bassussary is located in the former province of Labourd and within the urban area of Bayonne some 5 km south-east of Biarritz and 4 km south by south-west of Bayonne. Access to the commune is by the D932 road from Anglet in the north which passes through the commune on the eastern side and continues south to Ustaritz. The town is in the west of the commune and can be accessed by the D254 road which branches from the D932 on the northern border of the commune and continues through the town west to join the D810 south-west of Biarritz Airport. The D3 comes from the A63 autoroute Exit 5 (Bayonne-Sud) to the town then south forming the western border of the commune and continuing to Arcangues. South-east of the town is another urban area of Betbeder. Much of the commune is urbanised with some areas of forest and meadows. The eastern part next to the D932 contains an industrial estate.

Two bus services pass through and have stops in the commune operated by Transports 64:

- Service 860 Bayonne to Cambo-les-Bains
- Service 880 Bayonne to Arbonne

The commune lies in the drainage basin of the Adour with the Nive river forming the whole eastern border of the commune as it flows north to join the Adour. The Ruisseau d'Urdains flows from a small lake just south of the commune northwards, forming the north-eastern border of the commune, before joining the Nive in the north-eastern corner. The Ruisseau de Harrieta flows from the south-west of the commune to the north-east joining the Ruisseau d'Urbaine near the D932. The Ruisseau de Pétaboure rises in the north-west of the commune and forms the northern border as it flows east to join the Ruisseau de Harrieta in the commune.

=== Places and Hamlets ===
- Axerimendi
- Behikenea
- Betbeder
- Borda Nasa
- Bordaberria
- Castanche
- Dorriotz
- Harrieta
- Juanita
- Juantipi
- Larrebure
- Lataste
- Luberri
- Martinaskoenea
- Moussans
- Oihenart
- Peillé
- Penen
- Portukoborda
- Urdains (château)
- la Vigne
- Xemeto

== Toponymy ==
The commune name in Basque is Basusarri. Jean-Baptiste Orpustan proposed a structure of baso meaning "forest" and sarri meaning "dense" or "tight" giving the overall meaning of "dense forest".

The following table details the origins of the commune name and other names in the commune.

Name	Spelling	Date	Source	Page	Origin	Description
Bassussarry	Bila-nave quœ vocatur Bassessarri	1150	Raymond	23	Bayonne	Village
	bila nave que nunc dicitur bassessarri	1170	Orpustan	30		
	Bassessarri	1186	Raymond	23	Bayonne	
	Bacessari	1256	Raymond	23	Bayonne	
	Bassissari	13th century	Raymond	23	Bayonne	
	Bassissarri	1265	Orpustan	30		
	Sanctus Bartholomeus de Bassussary	1768	Raymond	23	Collations	
	Bassussarits	1771	Raymond	23	Collations	
	Bassussary	1801	Raymond		Bulletin des Lois	
	Bassussarri	1926	Lhande			
Urdains	Urdaidz	1255	Raymond	171	Bayonne	Chateau
	Urdainz	1402	Raymond	171	Navarre	
	Ourdains	1739	Raymond	171	Register	

Sources:

- Raymond: Topographic Dictionary of the Department of Basses-Pyrenees, 1863, on the page numbers indicated in the table. (in French)
- Orpustan: Jean-Baptiste Orpustan, New Basque Toponymy
- Ldh/EHESS/Cassini: Des villages de Cassini aux communes d'aujourd'hui: Commune data sheet Bassussarry, EHESS (in French).
- Lhande: Pierre Lhande, Basque-French Dictionary, 1926 (in French)
- Register: Church Register of Bayonne

Origins:

- Bayonne: Cartulary of Bayonne or Livre d'Or (Book of Gold)
- Collations: Collations of the Diocese of Bayonne
- Navarre: Titles of the Kingdom of Navarre

Bassussarry appears as Baßußarry on the 1750 Cassini Map and does not appear at all on the 1790 version.

== History ==
During the Peninsular War on 10 December 1813 Bassussarry was the scene of a battle between General Suchet and the Spanish-English.

=== Heraldry ===
Arms of Bassussarry	Blazon: Party per pale, at 1 Gules 2 wood pigeons Argent in pale; at 2 Vert 3 oak leaves Argent 2 and 1; in chief Sable charged with a fess wavy Argent.

== Administration ==
List of Successive Mayors

From	To	Name
	1820	Pierre Michel Larre
	1850	Charles Larre
1995	2020	Paul Baudry
2020	2026	Michel Lahorgue

=== Intercommunality ===
Bassussarry is one of nine inter-communal structures:

- the Communauté d'agglomération du Pays Basque;
- the SIVOM of Arbonne-Arcangues-Bassussarry;
- the energy association of Pyrénées-Atlantiques;
- the inter-communal association for the management of the Txakurrak centre;
- the inter-communal association to support Basque culture;
- the joint association for the management of drinking water Ura;
- the joint association for collective and non-collective sanitation Ura
- the joint association of maritime Nive;
- the joint association of the drainage basin of the Nive.

Bassussarry is the seat of the SIVOM Arbonne-Arcangues-Bassussarry

The commune is part of the Bayonne-San Sebastián Eurocity.

== Demography ==
Historical population

Year	Pop.	±% p.a.
1793	263	—
1800	224	−2.27%
1806	276	+3.54%
1821	342	+1.44%
1831	332	−0.30%
1836	382	+2.85%
1841	424	+2.11%
1846	447	+1.06%
1851	411	−1.67%
1856	456	+2.10%
1861	467	+0.48%
1866	486	+0.80%
1872	398	−3.27%
1876	452	+3.23%
1881	401	−2.37%
1886	366	−1.81%
1891	358	−0.44%
1896	384	+1.41%
1901	420	+1.81%

Year	Pop.	±% p.a.
1906	404	−0.77%
1911	386	−0.91%
1921	331	−1.53%
1926	343	+0.71%
1931	342	−0.06%
1936	342	+0.00%
1946	331	−0.33%
1954	349	+0.66%
1962	350	+0.04%
1968	483	+5.51%
1975	715	+5.76%
1982	890	+3.18%
1990	1,056	+2.16%
1999	1,817	+6.22%
2007	2,391	+3.49%
2012	2,490	+0.81%
2017	3,126	+4.65%
2023	3,414	+1.48%

Source: EHESS and INSEE

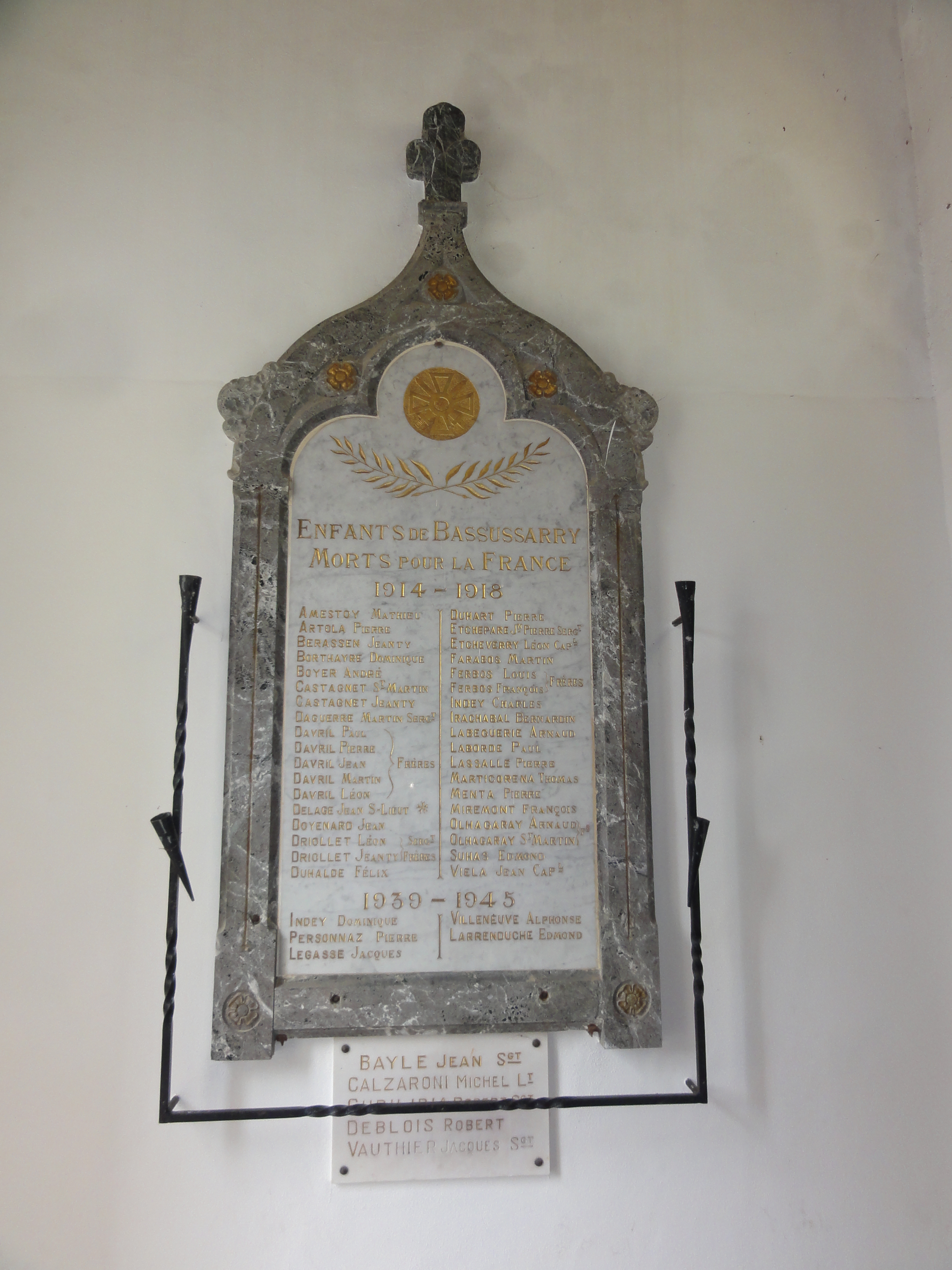
The War Memorial plaque in the church

=== Education ===
The commune has a public primary school.

== Economy ==
The commune is in the Appellation d'origine contrôlée (AOC) zone of Ossau-iraty

== Culture and heritage ==
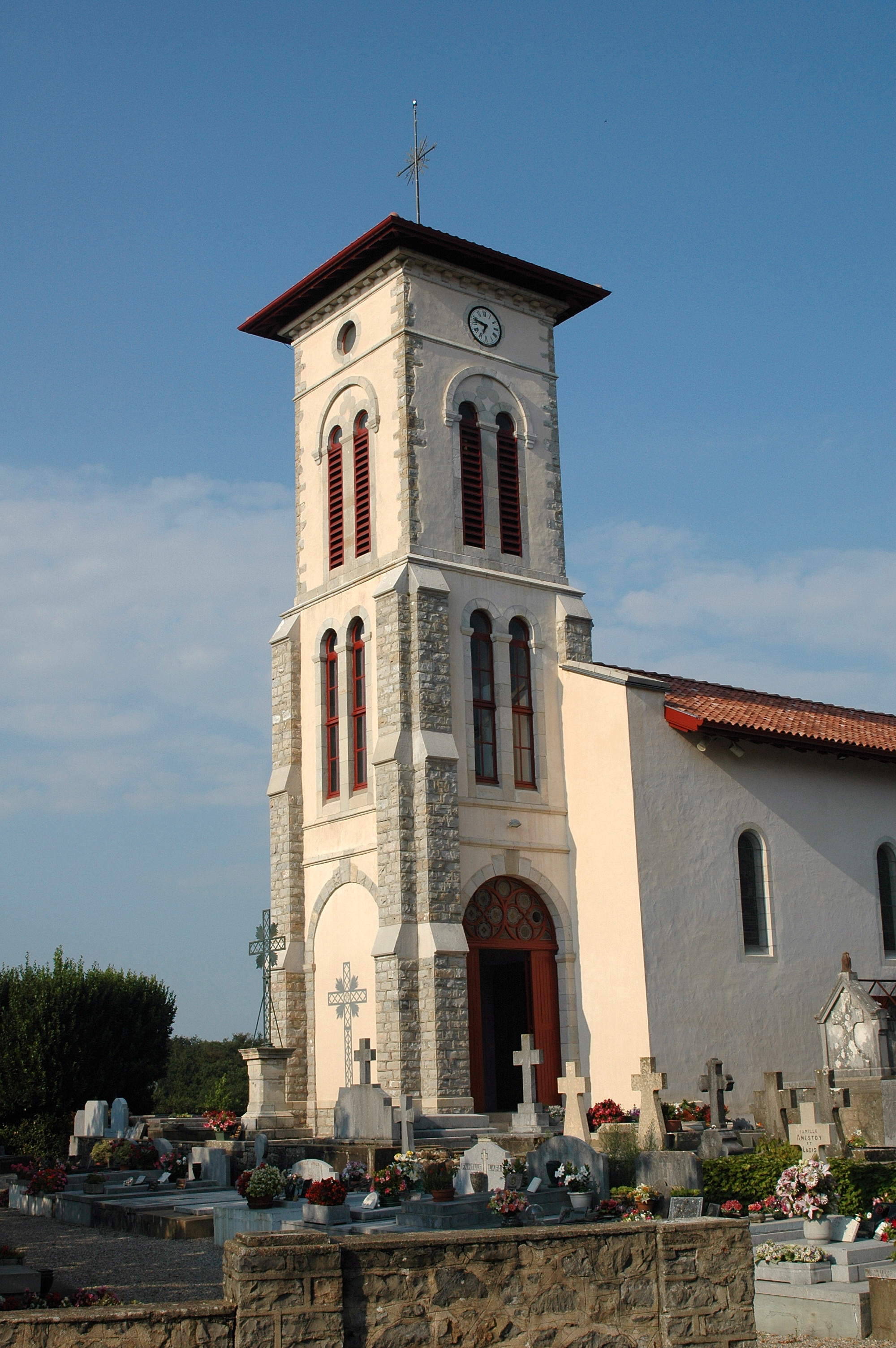
The Parish Church of Saint-Barthélemy

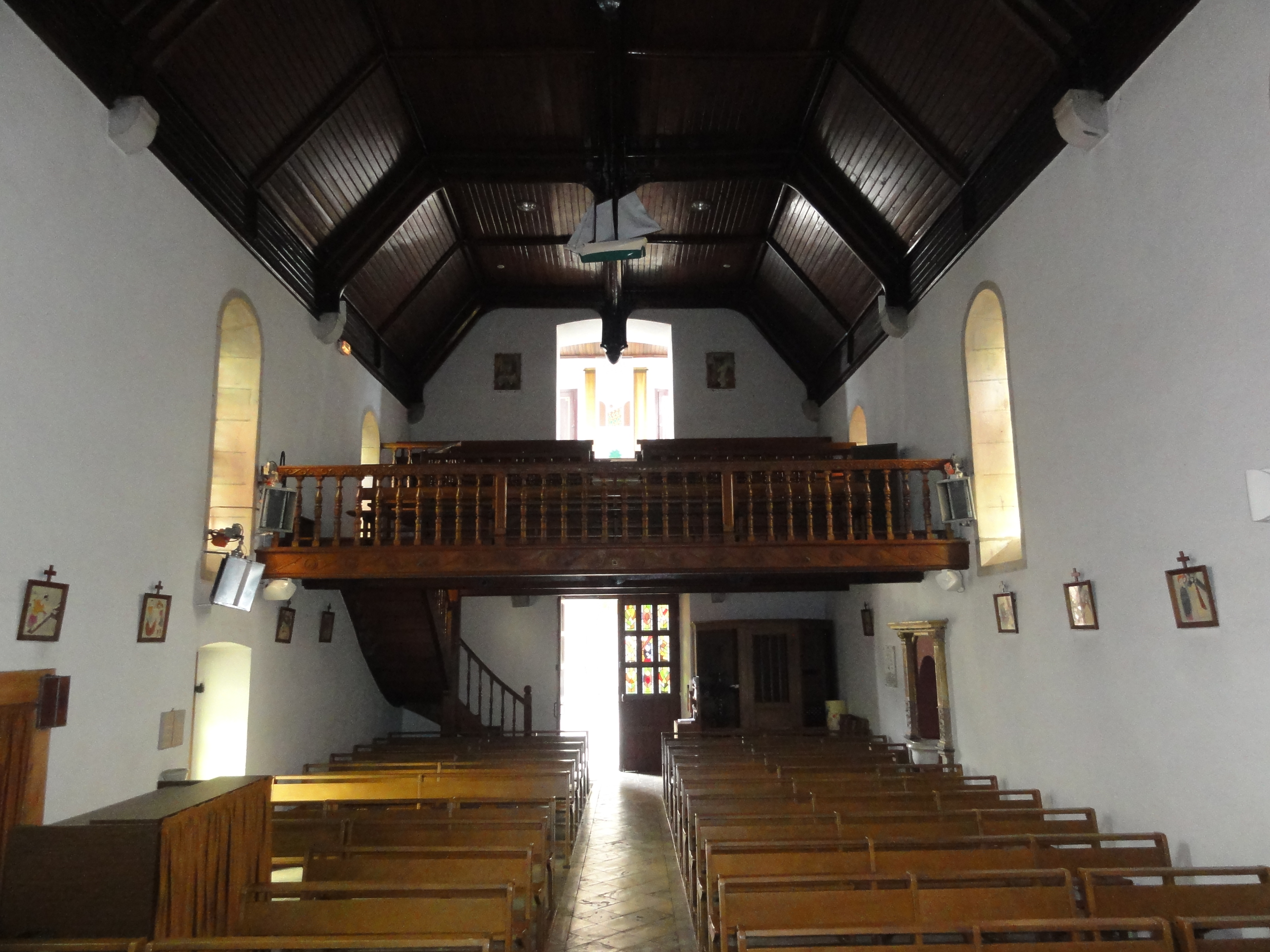
The Interior of the Church

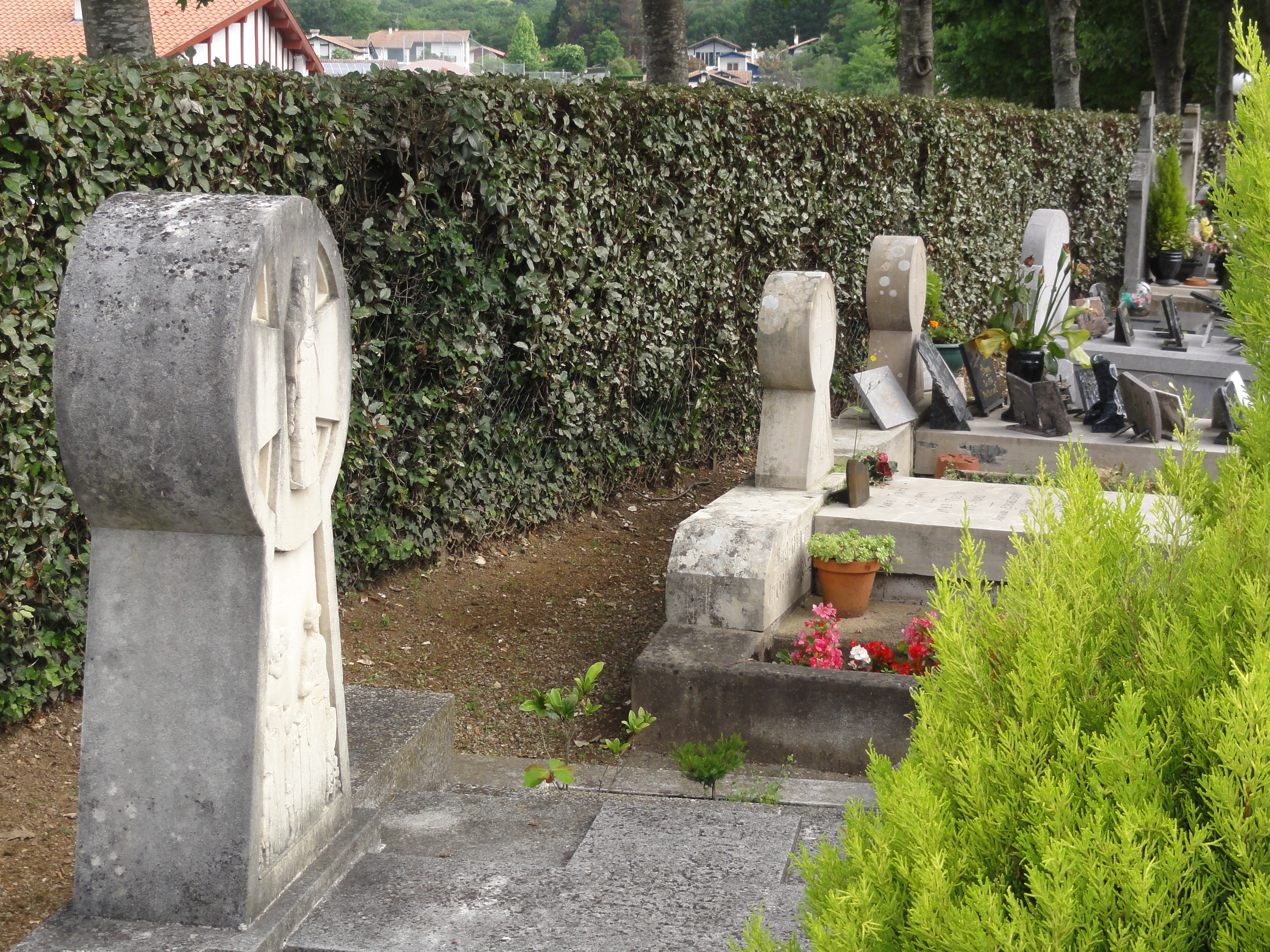
Basque Hilarri in the Cemetery

=== Religious heritage ===
The Parish Church of Saint-Barthélemy (19th century) is registered as an historical monument.

=== Language ===
According to the Map of the Seven Basque Provinces by Louis Lucien Bonaparte the Basque spoken in Bassussarry is Northern Upper Navarrese dialect.

== Notable people linked to the commune ==
- Dominique Joseph Garat, born in 1749 at Bayonne and died in 1833 at Bassussarry, was a lawyer, journalist, and French philosopher. He was elected to the Académie française in 1803.
- Christophe-Louis Légasse, born in 1859 at Bassussarry and died in 1931 at Périgueux, was a French Catholic Prelate, successively Apostolic prefect in Saint Pierre and Miquelon from 1899 to 1915, Bishop of Oran from 1915 to 1920, and Bishop of Périgueux from 1920 to 1931.
- Christophe Hondelatte, journalist born in 1962 at Bayonne, grew up in Bassussarry.

== See also ==
- Communes of the Pyrénées-Atlantiques department
