= Cantons of the Pyrénées-Atlantiques department =

The following is a list of the 27 cantons of the Pyrénées-Atlantiques department, in France, following the French canton reorganisation which came into effect in March 2015:

- Anglet
- Artix et Pays de Soubestre
- Baïgura et Mondarrain
- Bayonne-1
- Bayonne-2
- Bayonne-3
- Biarritz
- Billère et Coteaux de Jurançon
- Le Cœur de Béarn
- Hendaye-Côte Basque-Sud
- Lescar, Gave et Terres du Pont-Long
- Montagne Basque
- Nive-Adour
- Oloron-Sainte-Marie-1
- Oloron-Sainte-Marie-2
- Orthez et Terres des Gaves et du Sel
- Ouzom, Gave et Rives du Neez
- Pau-1
- Pau-2
- Pau-3
- Pau-4
- Pays de Bidache, Amikuze et Ostibarre
- Pays de Morlaàs et du Montanérès
- Saint-Jean-de-Luz
- Terres des Luys et Coteaux du Vic-Bilh
- Ustaritz-Vallées de Nive et Nivelle
- Vallées de l'Ousse et du Lagoin
