= Biriatou =

Biriatou Biriatu
- Commune
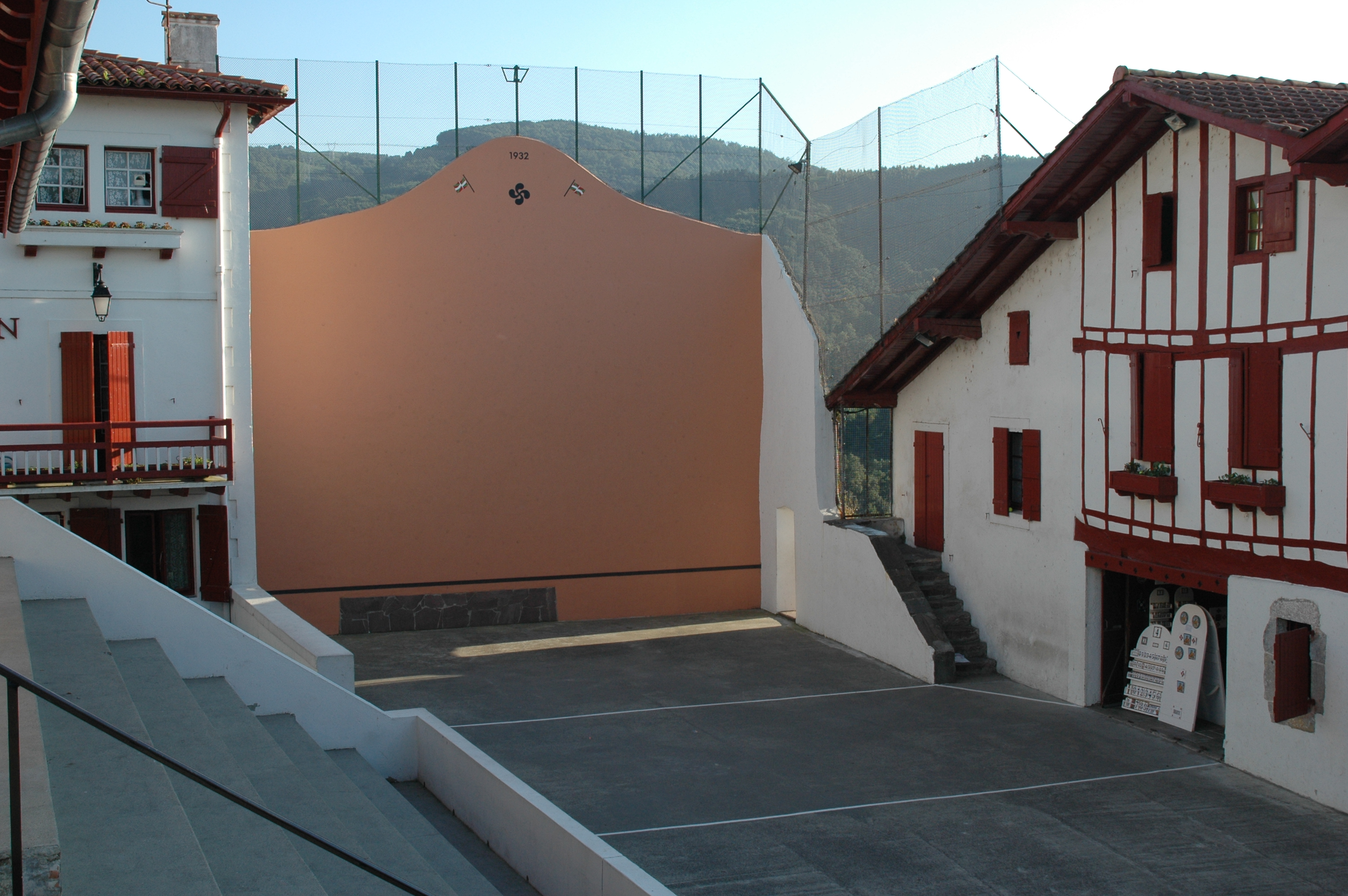
- Basque pelota pitch

- Coat of arms
- Location of Biriatou
- Location within France Location within Nouvelle-Aquitaine
- Coordinates: 43°20′03″N 1°44′31″W
- Country: France
- Region: Nouvelle-Aquitaine
- Department: Pyrénées-Atlantiques
- Arrondissement: Bayonne
- Canton: Hendaye-Côte Basque-Sud
- Intercommunality: CA Pays Basque

Government
  - Mayor (2020–2026): Solange Demarcq-Eguiguren
- Area^{1}: 11.04 km^{2} (4.26 sq mi)
- Elevation: 100 m (330 ft)
- Highest elevation: 552 m (1,811 ft)
- Lowest elevation: 0 m (0 ft)
- Population (2023): 1,297
  - Density: 117.5/km^{2} (304.3/sq mi)
- Time zone: UTC+01:00 (CET)
  - Summer (DST): UTC+02:00 (CEST)
- INSEE/Postal code: 64130 /64700
- ^{1} French Land Register data, which excludes lakes, ponds, glaciers > 1 km^{2} (0.386 sq mi or 247 acres) and river estuaries.

Biriatou (French pronunciation: [biʁjatu]; Basque: Biriatu) is a village and a commune in the Pyrénées-Atlantiques department in southwestern France. It is part of the traditional Basque province of Labourd.

The village lies on the edge of a hill rising east to the minor mount Xoldokogaina (486 m), the first noticeable prominence across the Spanish-French border at the lower Bidasoa. The hiking trail GR 10 crosses the village, heading east through the southern side of Xoldokogaina.

During World War II between 1941 and 1944, the Comet Escape Line helped 776 people, mostly British and American airmen who had been shot down over Nazi-occupied Europe, escape to Spain. The main route for crossing into Spain was about 1 mile (1.6 km) south of Biriatou. Comet Line operatives and Basque guides led escaping airmen across the Bidasoa River at night. The border crossing was illegal and clandestine because of Spanish, French, and German patrols. Comet leader Antoine d'Ursel, a Belgian, and American airman J. F. Burch were drowned in the flooded river on the night of 23-24 December 1943. A memorial in their honor has been placed near the river crossing where they drowned.

European road carriers and travellers are acquainted with the name, Basque for 'gate/pass of the way' (bide + ate), on account of the border customs and toll at the AP-8 - A-63 motorway to the west of the actual village, often jammed with vehicles and long queues.

== See also ==
- Communes of the Pyrénées-Atlantiques department
