= Canton of Hendaye-Côte Basque-Sud =

Coordinates: 43°21′56″N 1°43′15″W

Hendaye-Côte Basque-Sud
- Canton
- Interactive map of Hendaye-Côte Basque-Sud
- Country: France
- Region: Nouvelle-Aquitaine
- Department: Pyrénées-Atlantiques
- No. of communes: {{{nbcomm}}}
- Area: 69.56 km^{2} (26.86 sq mi)
- Population (2023): 30,060
  - Density: 432.1/km^{2} (1,119/sq mi)
- INSEE code: 64 10

The canton of Hendaye-Côte Basque-Sud (before 2015: Canton of Hendaye) is an administrative division in southern France. At the French canton reorganisation which came into effect in March 2015, the canton was renamed and reduced from 4 to 3 communes:

- Biriatou
- Hendaye
- Urrugne

== See also ==
- Cantons of the Pyrénées-Atlantiques department
