= Bidart =

Bidart Bidarte
- Commune
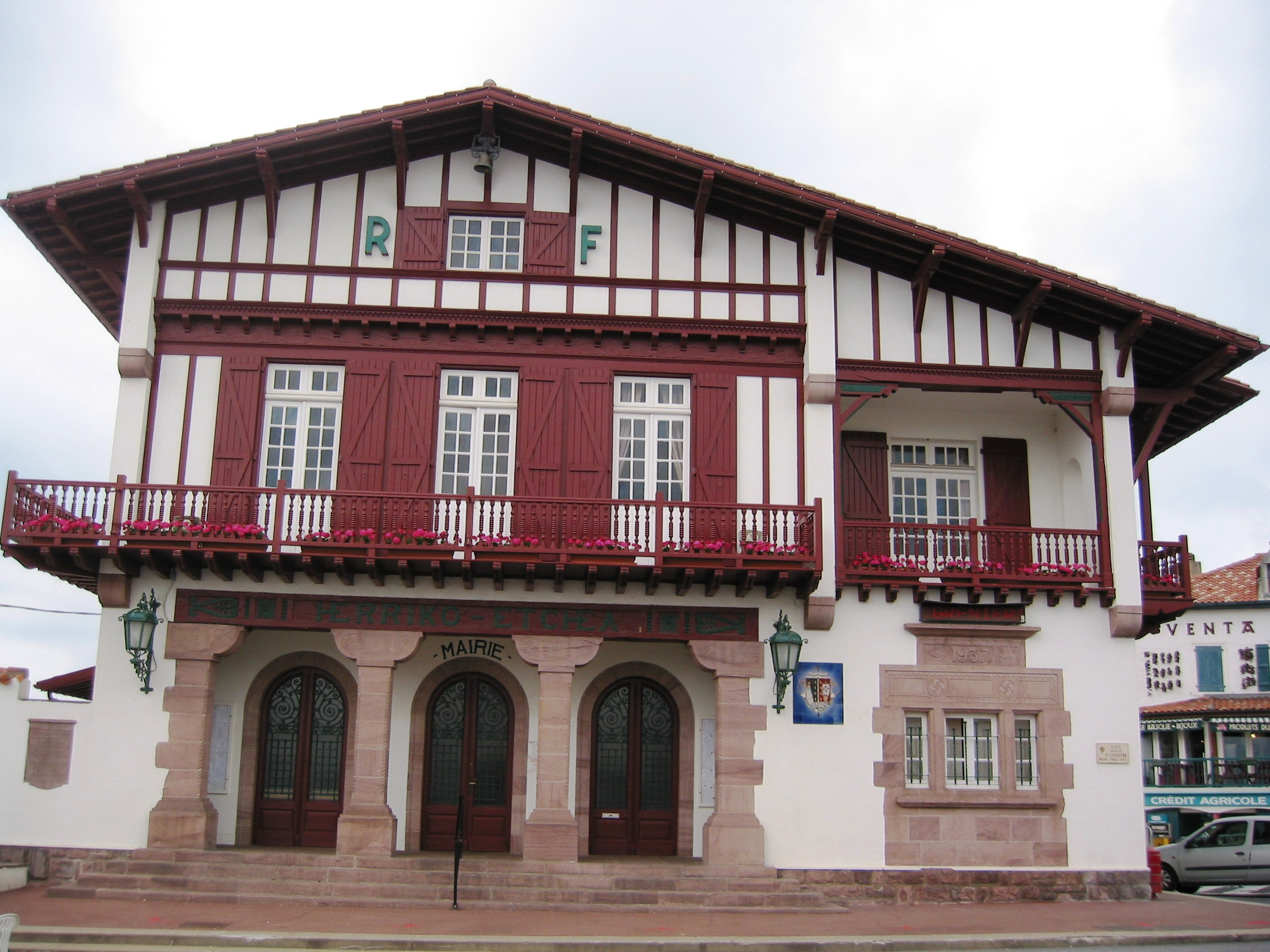
- The town hall of Bidart

- Coat of arms
- Location of Bidart
- Location within France Location within Nouvelle-Aquitaine
- Coordinates: 43°26′17″N 1°35′30″W
- Country: France
- Region: Nouvelle-Aquitaine
- Department: Pyrénées-Atlantiques
- Arrondissement: Bayonne
- Canton: Saint-Jean-de-Luz
- Intercommunality: CA Pays Basque

Government
  - Mayor (2020–2026): Emmanuel Alzuri
- Area^{1}: 12 km^{2} (4.6 sq mi)
- Elevation: 60 m (200 ft)
- Highest elevation: 80 m (260 ft)
- Lowest elevation: 0 m (0 ft)
- Population (2023): 7,689
  - Density: 640/km^{2} (1,700/sq mi)
- Time zone: UTC+01:00 (CET)
  - Summer (DST): UTC+02:00 (CEST)
- INSEE/Postal code: 64125 /64210
- ^{1} French Land Register data, which excludes lakes, ponds, glaciers > 1 km^{2} (0.386 sq mi or 247 acres) and river estuaries.

Bidart (French pronunciation: [bidaʁ]; Basque: Bidarte) is a commune of the Pyrénées-Atlantiques department in southwestern France.

It is located in the traditional Basque province of Labourd.

== Population ==
Historical population
Year	Pop.	±% p.a.
1968	2,436	—
1975	2,748	+1.74%
1982	3,044	+1.47%
1990	4,123	+3.87%
1999	4,670	+1.39%
2007	5,718	+2.56%
2012	6,513	+2.64%
2017	6,811	+0.90%
2023	7,689	+2.04%
Source: INSEE

== See also ==
- Communes of the Pyrénées-Atlantiques department
