= Canton of Saint-Jean-de-Luz =

Coordinates: 43°24′11″N 1°37′09″W

Saint-Jean-de-Luz
- Canton
- Interactive map of Saint-Jean-de-Luz
- Country: France
- Region: Nouvelle-Aquitaine
- Department: Pyrénées-Atlantiques
- No. of communes: {{{nbcomm}}}
- Area: 40.04 km^{2} (15.46 sq mi)
- Population (2023): 29,803
  - Density: 744.3/km^{2} (1,928/sq mi)
- INSEE code: 64 24

The canton of Saint-Jean-de-Luz is an administrative division in southern France. Since the French canton reorganisation which came into effect in March 2015, the canton consists of the following 4 communes:

1. Bidart
2. Ciboure
3. Guéthary
4. Saint-Jean-de-Luz

== See also ==
- Cantons of the Pyrénées-Atlantiques department
