= Canton of Ustaritz-Vallées de Nive et Nivelle =

Coordinates: 43°24′N 1°27′W

Ustaritz-Vallées de Nive et Nivelle
- Canton
- Interactive map of Ustaritz-Vallées de Nive et Nivelle
- Country: France
- Region: Nouvelle-Aquitaine
- Department: Pyrénées-Atlantiques
- No. of communes: {{{nbcomm}}}
- Area: 229.76 km^{2} (88.71 sq mi)
- Population (2023): 34,876
  - Density: 151.79/km^{2} (393.14/sq mi)
- INSEE code: 6426

The canton of Ustaritz-Vallées de Nive et Nivelle (before 2015: canton of Ustaritz) is a canton of France, in the Pyrénées-Atlantiques department. Its chief town is Ustaritz.

== Composition ==
At the French canton reorganisation which came into effect in March 2015, the canton was renamed and received the following 9 communes:

1. Ahetze
2. Ainhoa
3. Arbonne
4. Arcangues
5. Ascain
6. Bassussarry
7. Saint-Pée-sur-Nivelle
8. Sare
9. Ustaritz

== History ==
In 1790, Saint-Pée-sur-Nivelle was the chief town of a canton composed of the communes of Ahetze and Saint-Pée-sur-Nivelle, and part of the district of Ustaritz. At the time, the canton of Ustaritz consisted of the communes of Arbonne, Arcangues, Jatxou, Ustaritz and Villefranque. Before 2015, the canton of Ustaritz consisted of the communes Ahetze, Arbonne, Arcangues, Bassussarry, Halsou, Jatxou, Larressore, Saint-Pée-sur-Nivelle and Ustaritz.

Population by year (before 2015: canton of Ustaritz)
2017	31,855
2012	25,177
2006	22,093
1999	19,192
1990	15,962
1982	13,482
1975	10,912
1968	9,555

== See also ==
- Cantons of the Pyrénées-Atlantiques department
