= Arcangues =

Arcangues Arrangoitze
- Commune
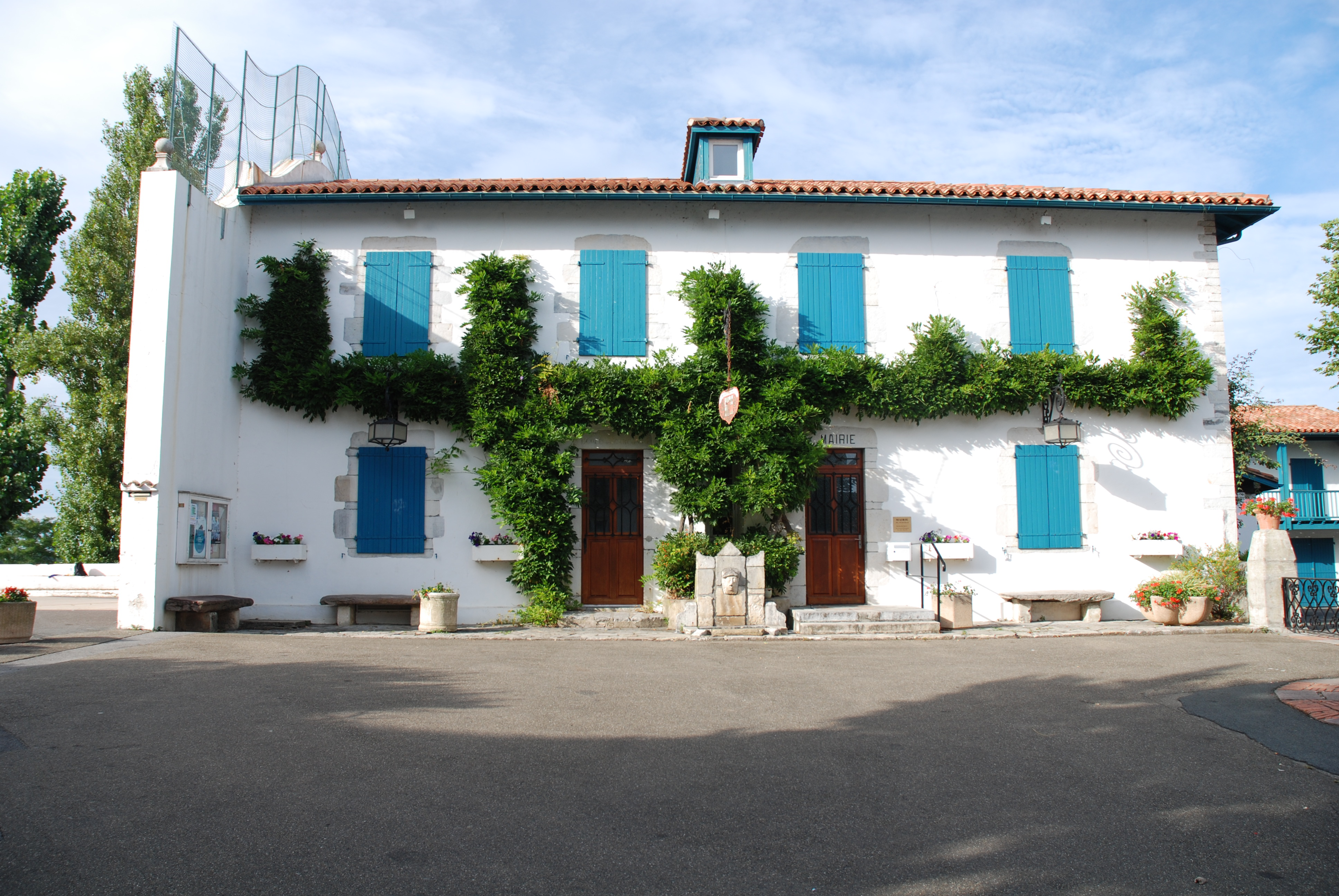
- Arcangues Town Hall

- Coat of arms
- Location of Arcangues
- Location within France Location within Nouvelle-Aquitaine
- Coordinates: 43°26′15″N 1°31′11″W
- Country: France
- Region: Nouvelle-Aquitaine
- Department: Pyrénées-Atlantiques
- Arrondissement: Bayonne
- Canton: Ustaritz-Vallées de Nive et Nivelle
- Intercommunality: CA Pays Basque

Government
  - Mayor (2020–2026): Philippe Echeverria
- Area^{1}: 17.47 km^{2} (6.75 sq mi)
- Elevation: 60 m (200 ft)
- Highest elevation: 140 m (460 ft)
- Lowest elevation: 4 m (13 ft)
- Population (2023): 3,657
  - Density: 209.3/km^{2} (542.2/sq mi)
- Time zone: UTC+01:00 (CET)
  - Summer (DST): UTC+02:00 (CEST)
- INSEE/Postal code: 64038 /64200
- ^{1} French Land Register data, which excludes lakes, ponds, glaciers > 1 km^{2} (0.386 sq mi or 247 acres) and river estuaries.

Arcangues (French pronunciation: [aʁkɑ̃g]; Basque: Arrangoitze) is a commune in the Pyrénées-Atlantiques department in the Nouvelle-Aquitaine region of southwestern France in what was formerly the Basque province of Labourd.

== Geography ==
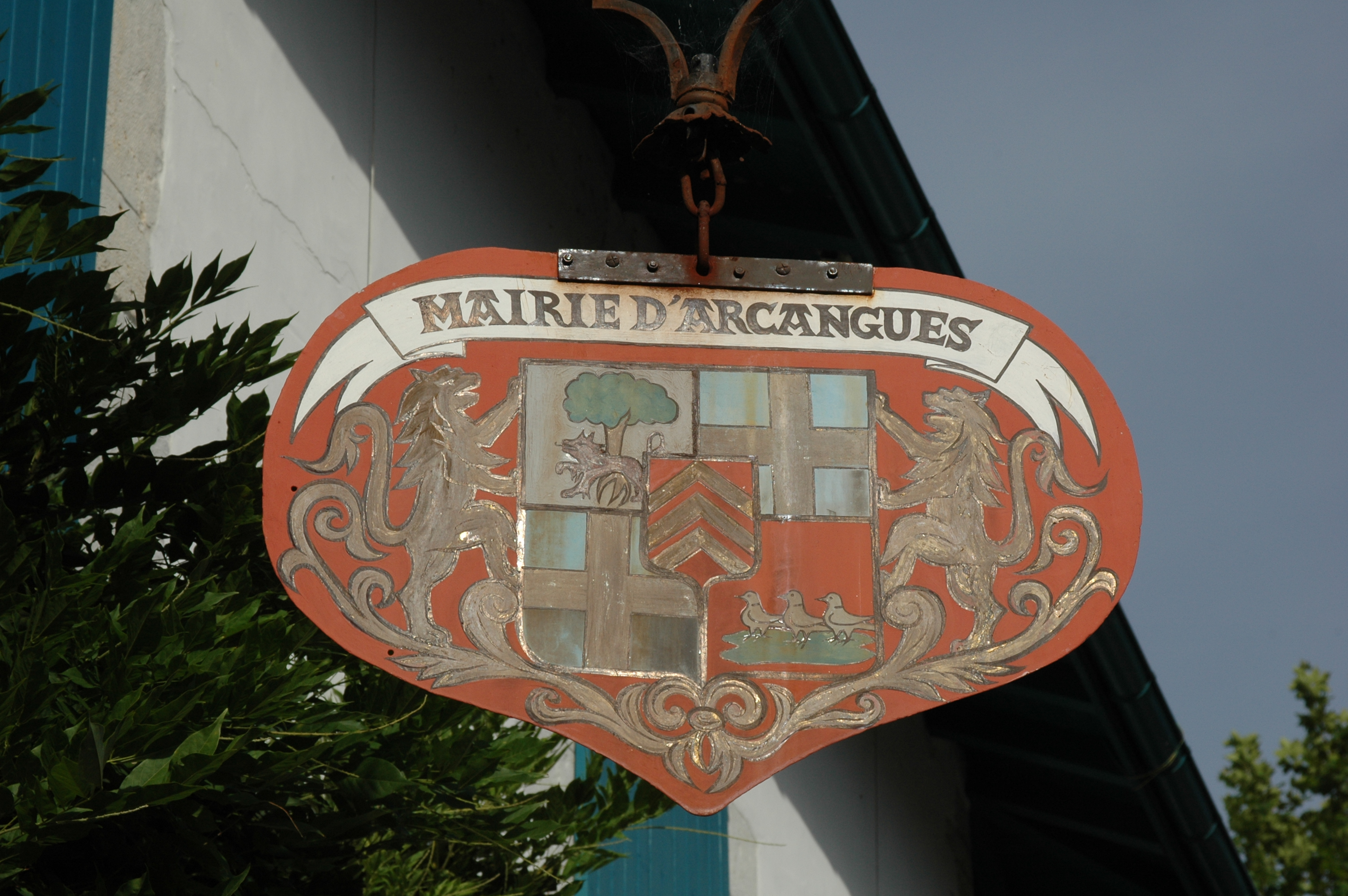
The Arms of Arcangues

=== Location ===
Arcangues belongs to the urban area of Bayonne and is located some 10 km south by south-west of Bayonne, 8 km south-east of Biarritz, and 6 km north-west of Ustaritz.

=== Access ===
The A63 autoroute passes through the northern tip of the commune with the nearest exit being Exit 4 to the west of the commune but the slightly farther Exit 5 to the east connects directly to the D3 road which passes south through the commune and the village to Saint-Pée-sur-Nivelle. There is also the D755 which branches off the D3 in the north of the commune and continues south through the west of the commune to join the D255 on the commune's south-western border. The D933 road from Anglet to Ustaritz also passes through the eastern tip of the commune with a roundabout linking to country roads in the commune.

=== Hydrography ===
The commune of Arcangues is traversed by the river Uhabia, the Urdainzko erreka, and the Harrietako erreka. The latter two discharge into the Nive, a tributary of the Adour.

=== Places and hamlets ===
- Ablaintz
- Abots
- Amestoia
- Arantzeta
- Arantzetakoborda
- Arnega
- Berriotz
- Bidauenea
- Borda Chipia
- Bordabaxea
- Bordattoa
- le Bosquet
- Chapelet
- la Chapelle
- le Château
- Chouroumillatché
- Dornarieta
- Ehailenborda
- Errota Handia
- Errotaxipia
- Etchegaraya
- Garaten Borda
- Gastelhur
- Gorriaenea
- Haranburua
- Harretchea
- Hirigoina
- Hotchaenea
- Kalonjaenea
- Kastillaborda
- Lahiton
- Lanchipiette
- Larrebidea
- Larreburua
- Larrechurria
- Logis d'Arbela
- Lortenea
- Marittipienea
- Mendibista
- Moulin d'Alotz
- Othe Xuria
- Othe Zahar
- Oyhambidea
- Planuya
- Sainte-Barbe
- Salazaharia
- Salha
- Teileria
- Xurrumilatx

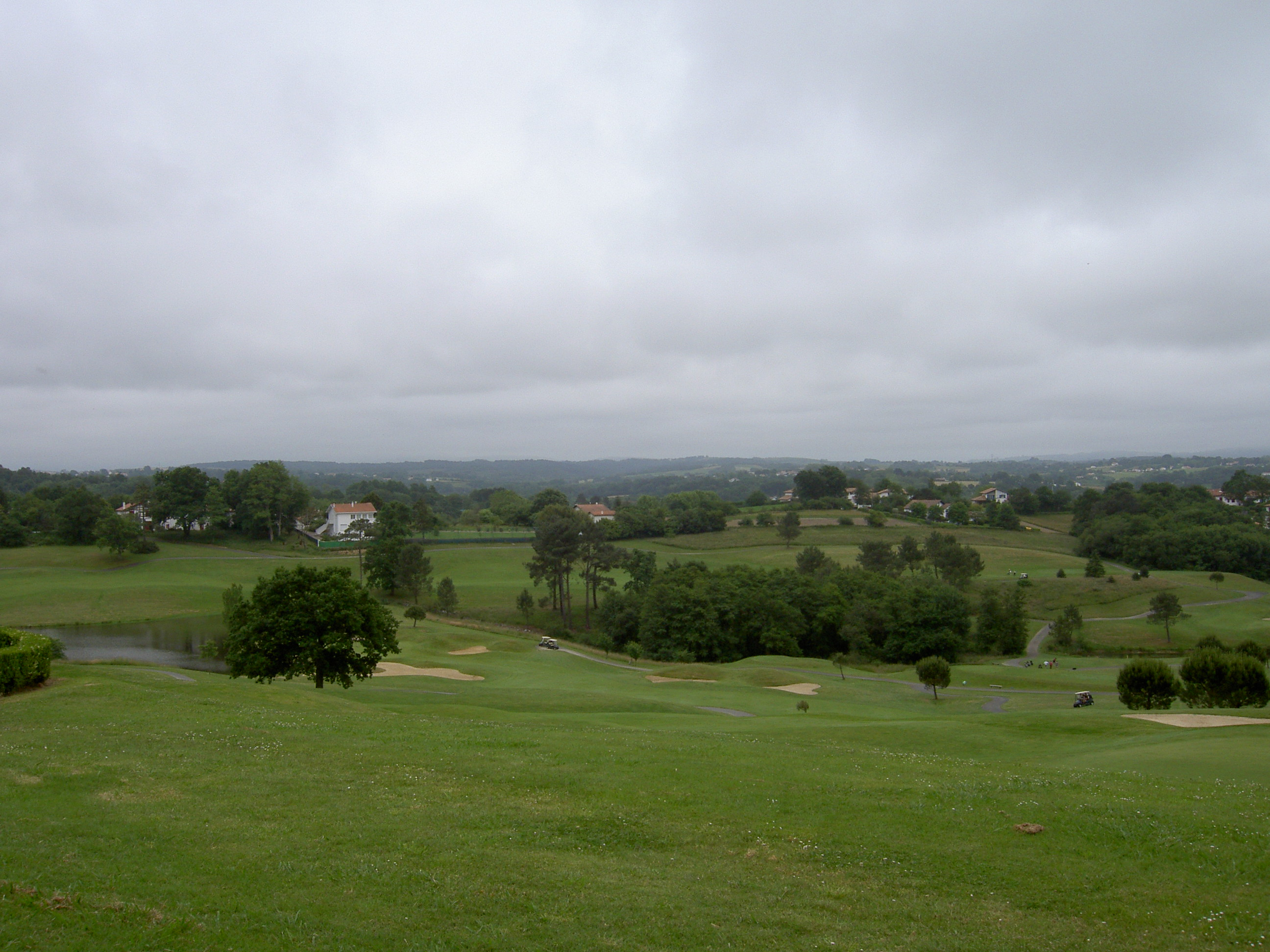
Golf course at Arcangues

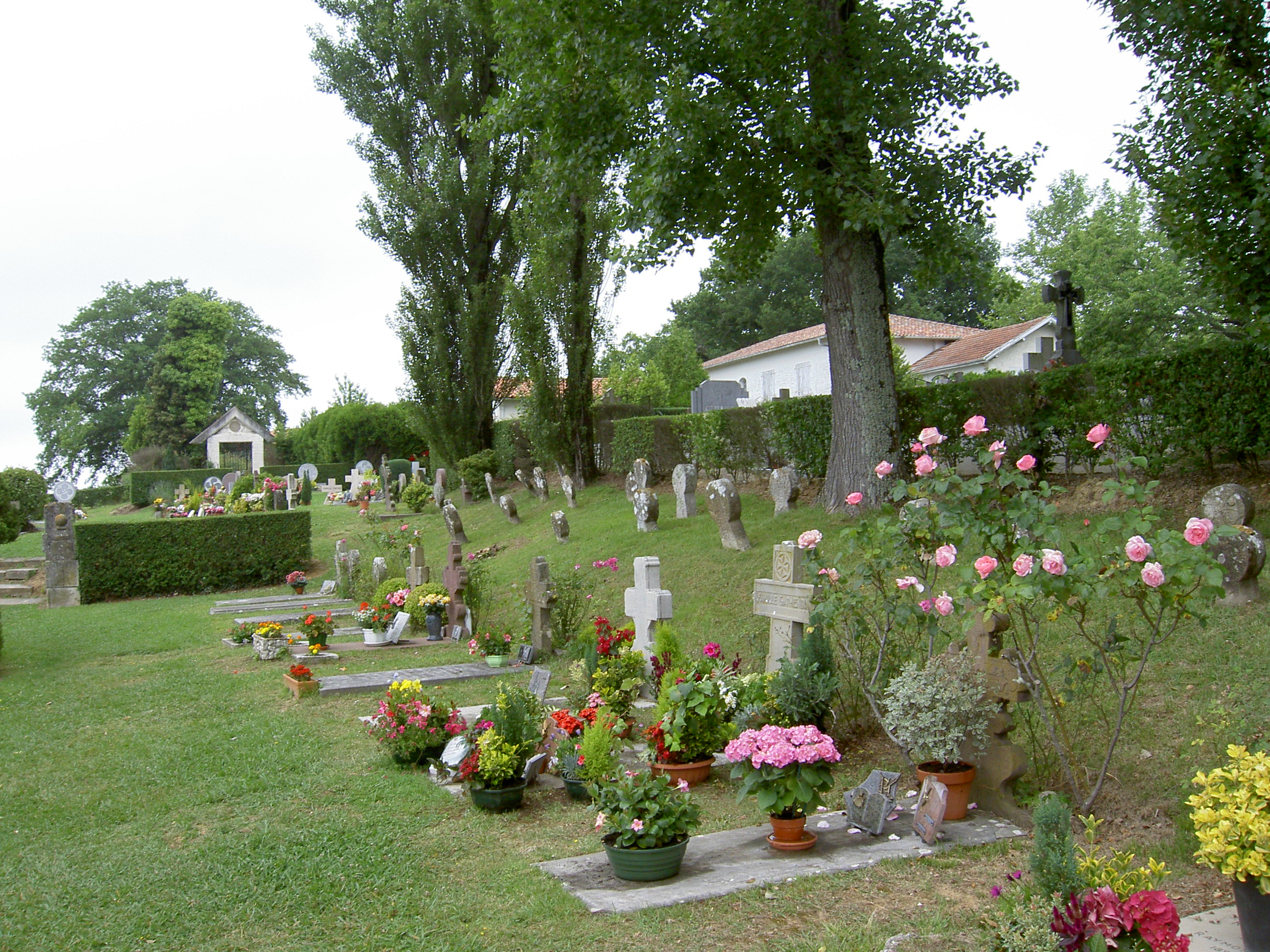
Cemetery at Arcangues with its characteristic basque headstones

== Toponymy ==
The basque name of the commune is Arrangoitze.

Jean-Baptiste Orpustan proposed a joining of the basque words ar-gain, meaning "high rock", and -goiz meaning "an open position facing east" which results in the compound meaning "high rocks facing east".

The following table details the origins of the commune name and other names in the commune.

Name	Spelling	Date	Source	Page	Origin	Description
Arcangues	Archangos	1170	Orpustan	31		Village
	Archagos	1170	Orpustan	31		
	Archagos	12th century	Raymond	9	Bayonne	Village
	Arcangos	1249	Orpustan	31		
	Arcangos	1255	Raymond	9	Bayonne	
	Archangos	13th century	Raymond	9		
	Argangois	1302	Raymond	9	Chapter	
	Argangos	1302	Raymond	9	Chapter	
	Saint-Jean-Baptiste d'Arcangos	16th century	Raymond	9	Collations	
Ablaintz	Ablaintz	1083	Goyheneche			
	Naubeis	1149	Goyheneche			(Naubeys in Gascon
Abots	Abots	1863	Raymond	2		Village
Alotz	Alots	1863	Raymond	5		Stream which gave its name to the Moulin d'Alotz with a source in Arcangues and fed the Uhabia.
Berriotz	Le Bois de Berriots	13th century	Raymond	29	Bayonne	Wood
La Chapelle	La Chapelle	1863	Raymond	48		Hamlet
Chourroumilatch	Chouroumillatché	1863	Raymond	50		Mill
Dornadieta	Dornariette	1863	Raymond	57		Hamlet
Gastelhur	Gaztelur	1401	Arcangues	68		Farm
	Gastelur	1764	Raymond	68	Collations	There was a prebend of its name in the Church of Arcangues
	Gastellur	1863	Raymond	68		
Jauréguia	Jauréguia	1863	Raymond	85		Farm
Othe Zahar	Othéçarra	1863	Raymond	129		Wood
Sainte-Barbe	Sainte-Barbe	1863	Raymond	146		A rise in the land between Arcangues and Ustaritz

Sources:

- Orpustan: Jean-Baptiste Orpustan, New Basque Toponymy p. 31 (in French)
- Raymond: Topographic Dictionary of the Department of Basses-Pyrenees, 1863, on the page numbers indicated in the table. (in French)
- Goyheneche: Basque Country
- Arcangues: Arcangues, Under the direction of Hubert Lamant-Duhart

Origins:

- Bayonne: Cartulary of Bayonne or Livre d'Or (Book of Gold)
- Chapter: Titles of the Chapter of Bayonne
- Collations: Collations of the Diocese of Bayonne

== History ==
The lordship of Arcangues

The lordship of Arcangues has been mentioned since the 12th century. Sanche d'Arcangues and Aner de Archangos were cited as witnesses or guarantors of real estate transactions between 1150 and 1170.

Plague

The beginning of the 16th century in Labourd was marked by the appearance of the plague. The Gascon registers track its expansion. on 8 February 1517 the plague was reported in Arcangues.

The King's Prosecutors

The office of King's Prosecutor belonged to the Arcangues family from the 17th century. Also Laurent, Lord and patron of Arcangues, Curutcheta, and Elissagaray was prosecutor of the Bailiwick of Labourd from 1614 to 1643. His son Jean d'Arcangues received the office of King's Prosecutor by letters patent of Louis XIII of 4 July 1643. Pierre d'Arcangues continued in the office from 1670 to 1692. Finally Squire Gaspard d'Arcangues, Lord and patron of Arcangues and Curutcheta was the last family member to hold the office from 15 April 1714 to 1749.

The Marquis of Iranda

Squire Michel d'Arcangues, Lord and patron of Arcangues and Curutcheta, baptised at Bayonne on 17 October 1719, captain of the provincial militia of Labourd, married to Rose d'Aragorri (1722–1758), by which the title of Spanish Marquis of Iranda passed to their son Nicolas François Xavier d'Arcangues (Arcangues, 1753 - Saint-Pierre-d'Irube 1826). Rights to this title was authorized in France for life in April 1781 by letters patent of Louis XVI.

Michel Louis d'Arcangues (San Sebastian, 1790 - Bayonne, 1868) was the fourth Spanish Marquis of Iranda, Mayor of Arcangues for forty years and General Counsel for Basses-Pyrénées.

His eldest son, Alexis d'Arcangues (Bayonne, 1821 - Saint-Pierre-d'Irube 1877), succeeded him. He was mayor of Villefranque then Arcangues and General Counsel for Basses-Pyrénées.

Miguel Marie (Bayonne, 1857 - Arcangues, 1915), the 6th Spanish Marquis of Iranda, succeeded him.

Pierre d'Arcangues, born 12 April 1886 in Paris and died on 22 May 1973 in Arcangues, the 7th Marquis, was a poet and novelist and the father of Guy d'Arcangues, the 8th Marquis of Iranda, Viscount of Ascubea, and writer, who wrote in particular Les Tambours de Septembre (The Drums of September).

The home to the Marquis d'Arcangues, the Chateau of Arcangues, was used as the Duke of Wellington's headquarters during the December 1813 Battle of the Nive in the Peninsular War. Kincaid, an officer in the Rifle Brigade (95th Regiment of Foot, part of the Light Division) was billeted in the Chateau and makes extensive reference to it and its occupants in his memoirs ‘Adventures in the Rifle Brigade’.

During the German occupation of France in World War II, the Nazis used the chateau as the headquarters for their local troops.

The French Thoroughbred racehorse Arcangues, who was given the village's name, won the 1993 Breeders' Cup Classic at Santa Anita Park in Arcadia, California.

=== Heraldry ===
Arms of Arcangues	Blazon: Party per cross, first Argent, a tree eradicated of Vert and a lion passant of Gules over the trunk; second and third Azure, a cross of Or; fourth Gules with three pigeons Argent in line on a terrace in base Vert; over all an Inescutcheon of Gules with three chevrons of Or.

== Administration ==
List of Successive Mayors

Mayors from the French Revolution to 1929

From	To	Name
1790		Jean Baptiste Michel Larre
1791	1794	Jean Etcheberry
1794	1795	Jean Laborde
1795	1797	Pierre Mimiague
1797	1799	Bertrand Dunate
1799	1800	Jean Laborde Petita
1800	>1803	Dominique Bastres
<1815	1815	Jean-Baptiste Larre
1815	1827	Michel d'Arcangues
1827	1833	Michel Garrin
1833	1837	Étienne Mimiague
1837	1840	Pierre Darthayet
1840	1848	Michel Garrin
1848	1852	Étienne Mimiague
1852	1868	Michel d'Arcangues
1868	1871	Jean Aldabe
1871	1878	Alexis d'Arcangues
1878	1892	Dominique Doyhenard
1892	1904	Alexandre Molinié
1904	1906	Michel d'Arcangues
1906	1908	Jean Aldabe
1908	1915	Michel d'Arcangues
1915	1919	Jean Biolet
1919	1929	André Soulange-Bodin

Mayors from 1929

From	To	Name
1929	1969	Pierre d'Arcangues
1969	1971	Jean d'Arcangues
1971	1983	Albert Viala
1983	2014	Jean-Michel Colo
2014	2026	Philippe Echeverria

=== Inter-communality ===
Arcangues is part of seven inter-communal structures:

- the Communauté d'agglomération du Pays Basque;
- the SIVOM of Arbonne-Arcangues-Bassussarry;
- the inter-communal association for management of the Txakurrak centre;
- the association for promotion of Basque culture;
- the mixed association for management of drinking water for Ura;
- the mixed association for sanitation for Ura;
- the Energy association of Pyrénées-Atlantiques.

The commune is part of the Basque Bayonne - San Sebastian Eurocity.

== Demography ==
The inhabitants of the commune are known as Arcanguais or Arcanguaises in French, and as Arrangoiztar in Basque.

Historical population

Year	Pop.	±% p.a.
1793	680	—
1800	617	−1.38%
1806	761	+3.56%
1821	836	+0.63%
1831	889	+0.62%
1836	982	+2.01%
1841	964	−0.37%
1846	994	+0.61%
1851	1,055	+1.20%
1856	1,083	+0.53%
1861	1,099	+0.29%
1866	1,087	−0.22%
1872	1,006	−1.28%
1876	1,061	+1.34%
1881	1,028	−0.63%
1886	1,040	+0.23%
1891	975	−1.28%
1896	1,051	+1.51%
1901	1,084	+0.62%

Year	Pop.	±% p.a.
1906	1,072	−0.22%
1911	1,093	+0.39%
1921	1,028	−0.61%
1926	1,062	+0.65%
1931	1,271	+3.66%
1936	1,149	−2.00%
1946	1,110	−0.34%
1954	1,160	+0.55%
1962	1,348	+1.90%
1968	1,580	+2.68%
1975	1,728	+1.29%
1982	2,155	+3.20%
1990	2,506	+1.90%
1999	2,733	+0.97%
2007	3,076	+1.49%
2012	3,133	+0.37%
2017	3,160	+0.17%
2023	3,657	+2.46%

Source: EHESS and INSEE

== Economy ==
The town is part of the Appellation d'origine contrôlée (AOC) zone designation of Ossau-iraty.

ETPM (Multiple Public Works Company) is an independent French company based in Arcangues whose main activity is the execution of works for electrical and telecommunication networks.

== Culture and Heritage ==
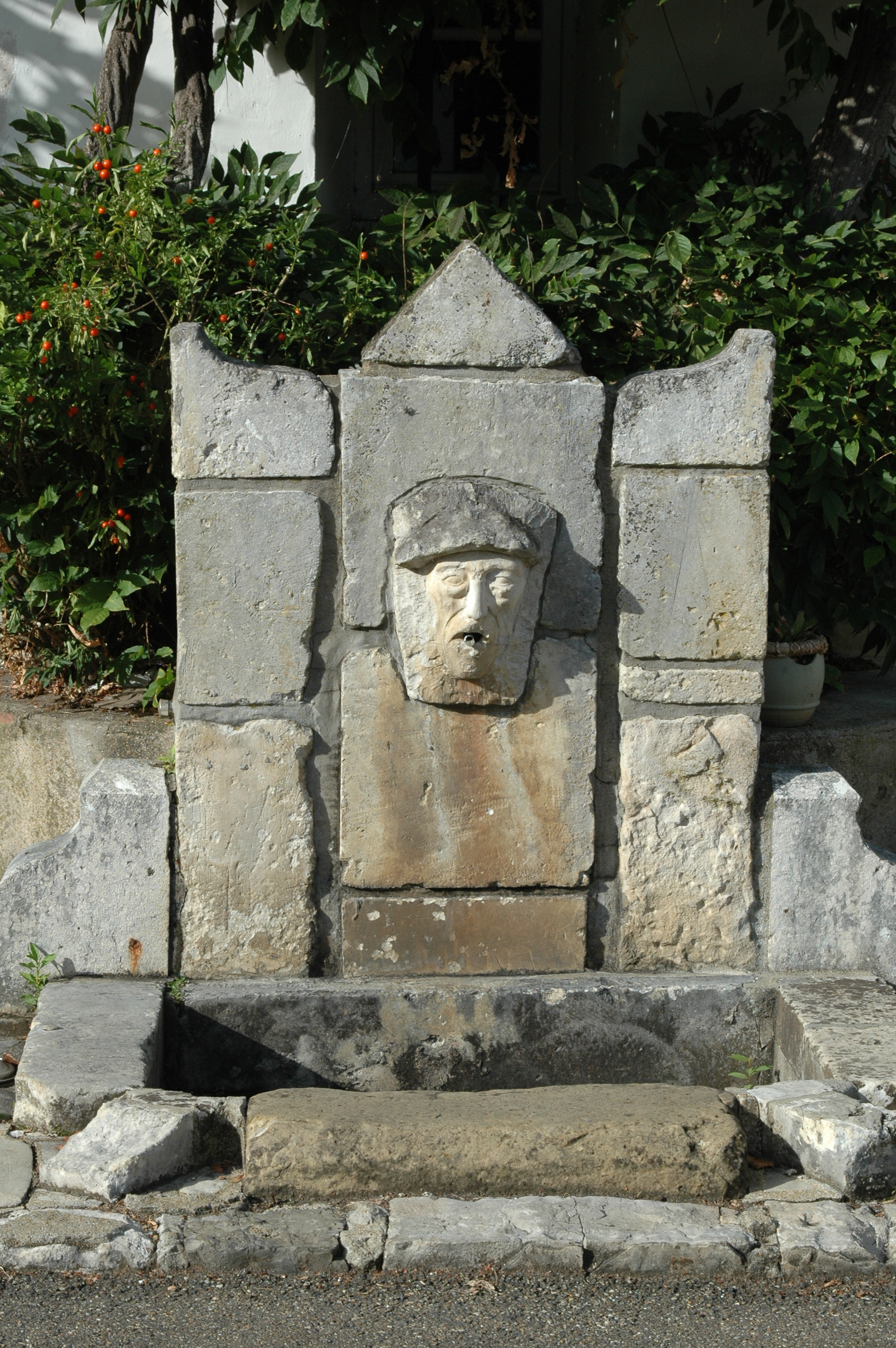
The Brasket Fountain on the Town Hall square

The shutters of a Basque house, made with solid wood slats, are painted the same colour as the other wooden parts of the facades or framing. They are generally in a dark red called "basque red". There has also been, since the 19th century, a very dark blue - a kind of Prussian blue - and a "deep" dark green also as well as sometimes a very light gray. At Arcangues the Marquis, Pierre d'Arcangues, introduced a lighter blue, which has retained the name Blue of Arcangues.

It was in Arcangues that the first Seaska Ikastola was created in 1969.

=== Languages ===
According to the Map of the Seven Basque Provinces by Prince Louis-Lucien Bonaparte (1863), the Basque dialect spoken in Arcangues is Northern High Navarrese. However, the classification has changed. With new methodological criteria, the Basque dialectology has grown considerably in recent years and, according to the latest work by the philologist Koldo Zuazo, the Basque dialect used in Arcangues is Navarro-labourdin with an east–west sub-dialect. It is an intermediate sub-dialect combining the Navarro-labourdin sub-dialect of the east and the west.

Until then not to be educated or to be illiterate was not a problem in the Basque Country. The inhabitants had their oral culture and that was enough to satisfy their needs. This lifestyle change radically in the 20th century and French replaced Basque in the general population since literacy was more useful in the dominant language. Then, in the late 1960s, a standard Basque was taught. It in no way replaced the local dialect but had the objective to integrate all formal sectors such as radio, television, print, Internet, research, teaching, literature, administration, etc. In informal areas, however, the dialect is still used, especially in areas where there are native Basque speakers. Despite all these changes it seems that, in the medium term, the navarro-labourdin dialect may disappear with its speakers and be replaced by a unified language: batua.

=== Civil heritage ===
- The Chateau of Arcangues is registered as an historical monument. It was rebuilt in 1900. The central body of the building, flanked by two wings, is surmounted by a glass roof which illuminates the interior of the building. It stands on a small hill in the middle of a small park planted with oaks.
  - The first Chateau of Arcangues seems to have been built in the 12th century and was the seat of the Lordship at the beginning of the village.
  - the Chateau of Arcangues, as with Bosquet, was occupied by the Germans during the Second World War;
- the Chateau of Bosquet was rebuilt in 1905 by Jean-Baptiste Ernest Lacombe for André Soulange-Bodin, Minister Plenipotentiary. It is located in the Lanchipiette quarter. Its main facade faces north built in the English style. The south facade is in Basque-Norman style. It opens onto a vast panorama of the Pyrenees and the Bay of Biscay.
- The Villa Berriots, built in 1929, is the work of architect Louis Sue and was built for the couturier Jean Patou. The Estate of the villa (1929) is registered as an historical monument.
- The Theatre of Nature, built in 1968 by the Bayonne architect Cazamayou, faces north below the Town Hall and the fronton. It appears in the form of a huge courtyard with a traditional structure, closed in the west by bay windows. The terraces on the south side are dominated by a huge Fresco by Ramiro Arrue.
- The Fountain in the square depicting the head of a man wearing a beret whose mouth spouts water represents Leon Hegoas, called Brasquette from the house of Brasketa, which the Marquis of Arcangues predicted "that it will do him good to drink water".
- The Marionako Borda House belonging to Luis Mariano, a former singer of international, is located in the commune.

=== Religious heritage ===
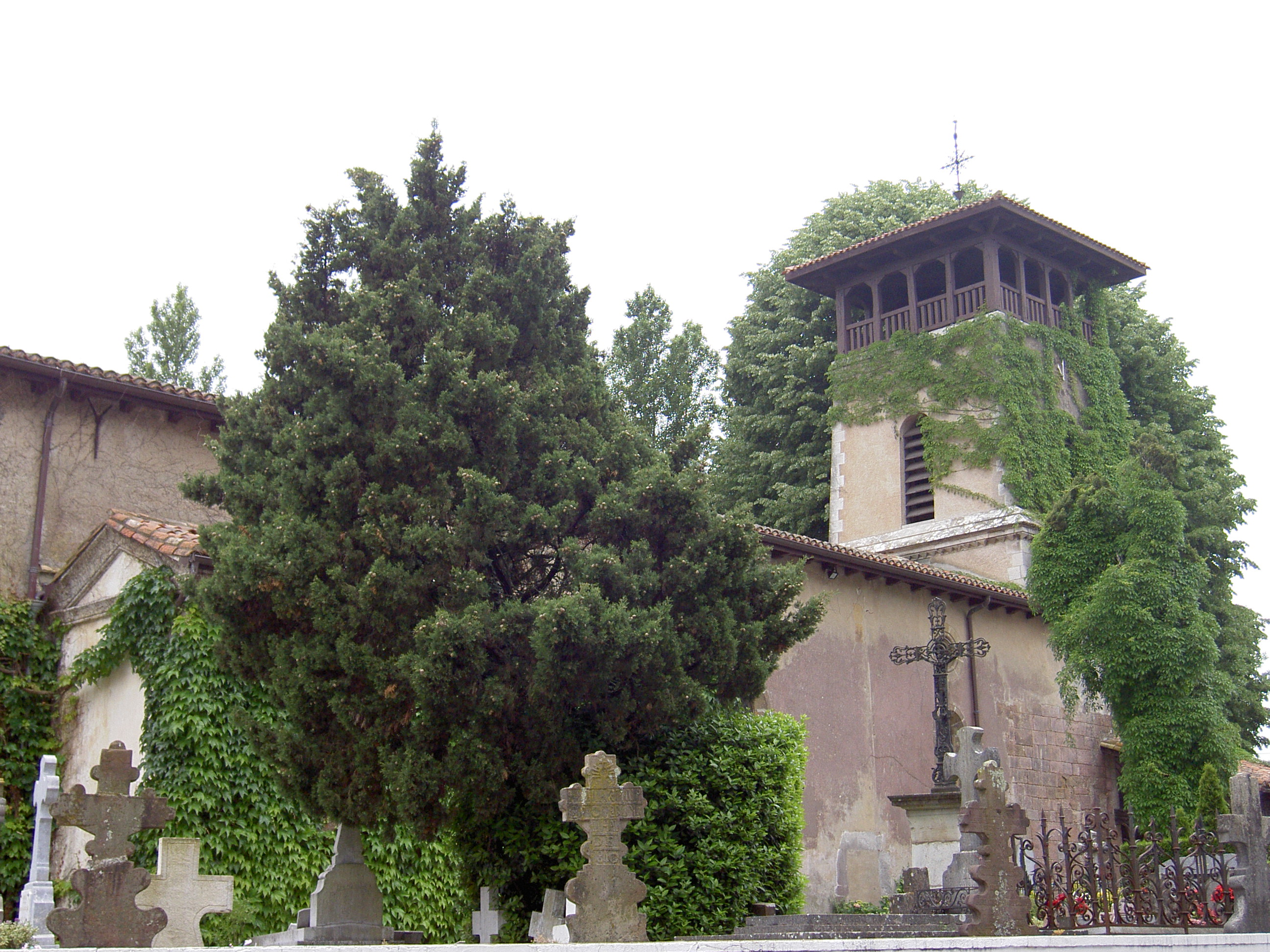
Church of Saint John the Baptist

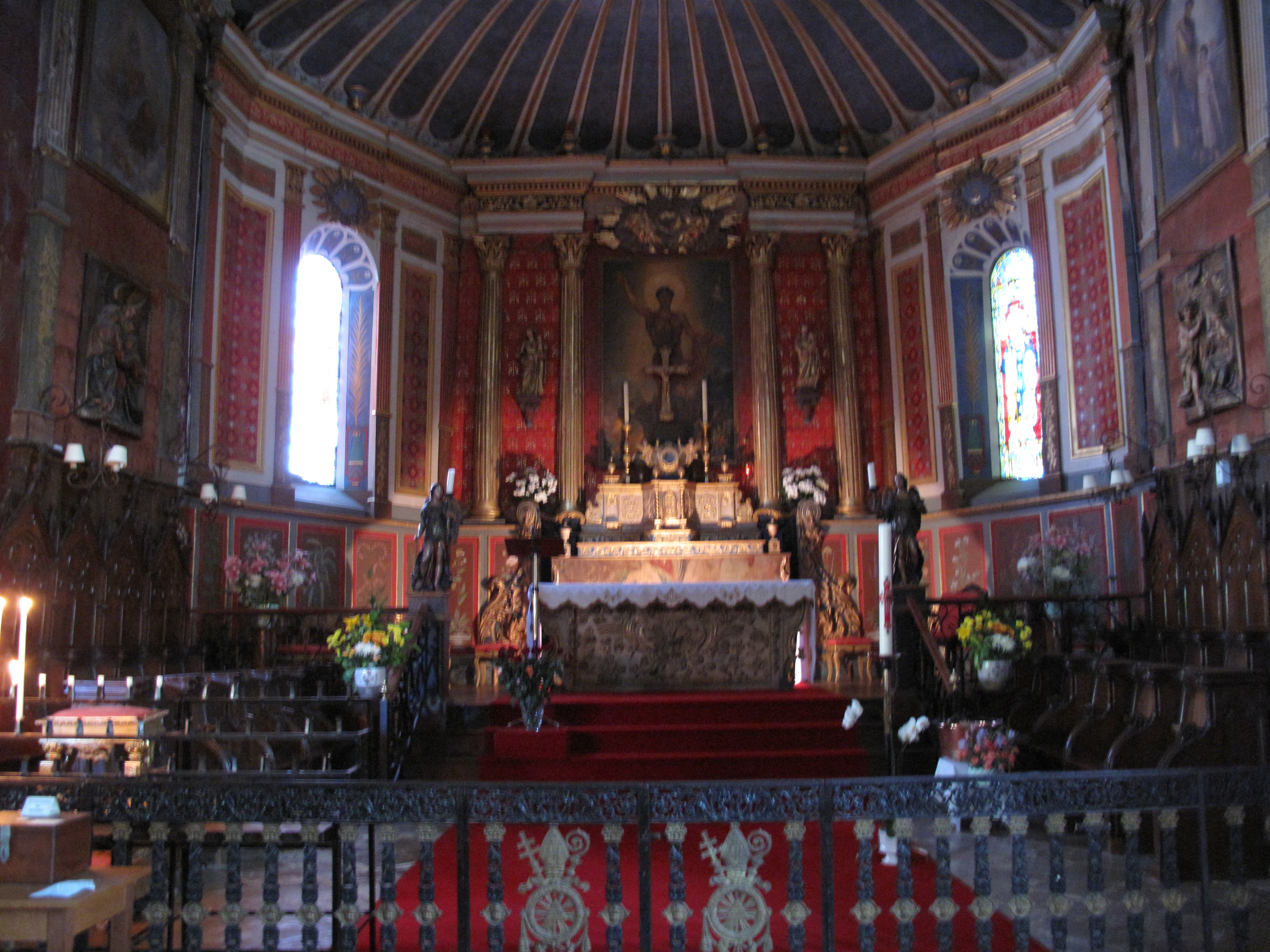
Interior of the Church of Saint John the Baptist

- The Church of Arcangues (12th century) has a Bell Tower (1516) which is registered as an historical monument. An inscription above the entrance to the chapel indicates that the Saint-Jean-Baptiste Church of Uhabia was founded in 1516 by Augier d'Arcangues, Squire and Lord.
- The Cemetery contains an impressive collection of Hilarri, mainly post-16th century, collected by the Marquis Pierre d'Arcangues and combining pieces from three provinces in French Basque country.
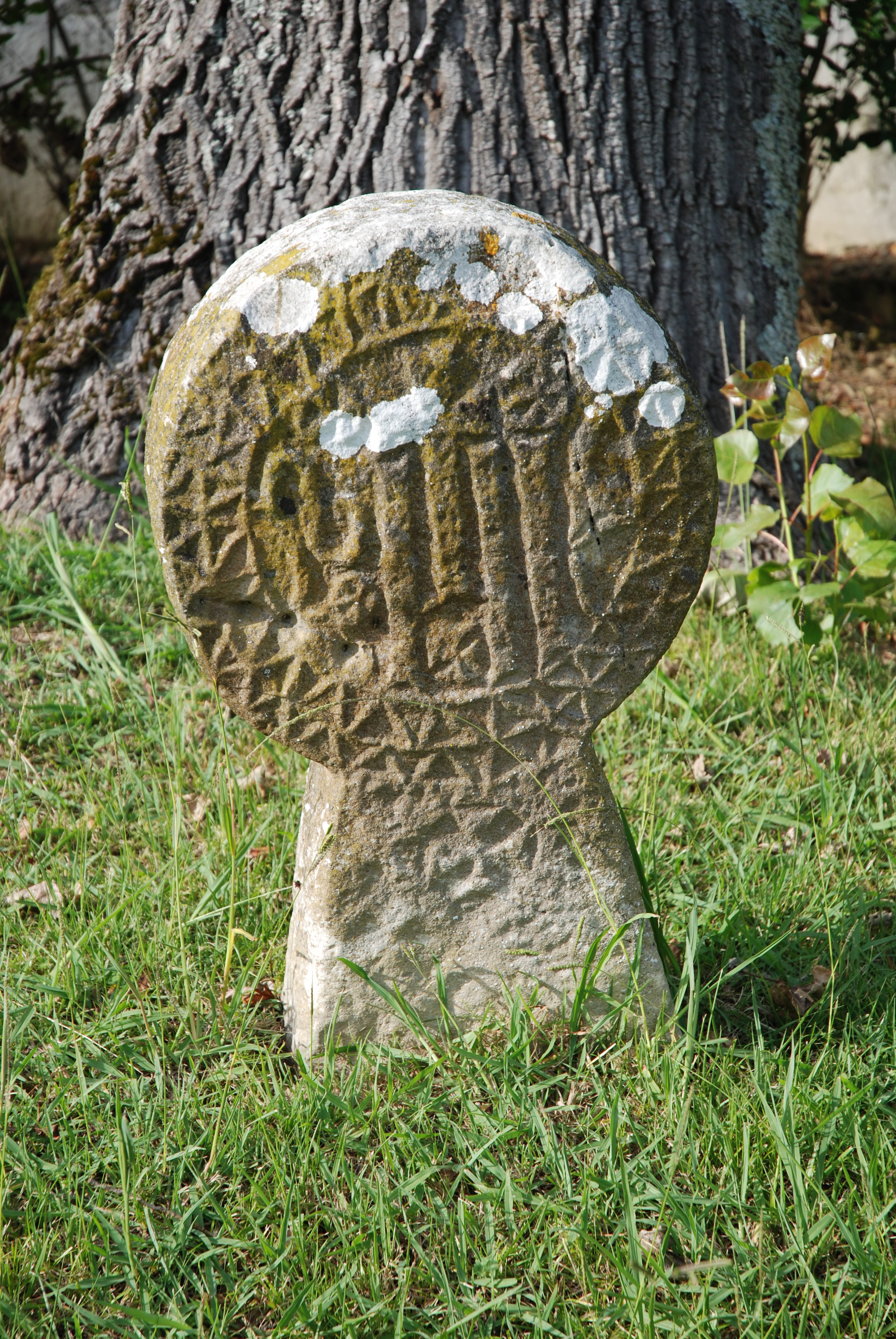
Funerary Stèle

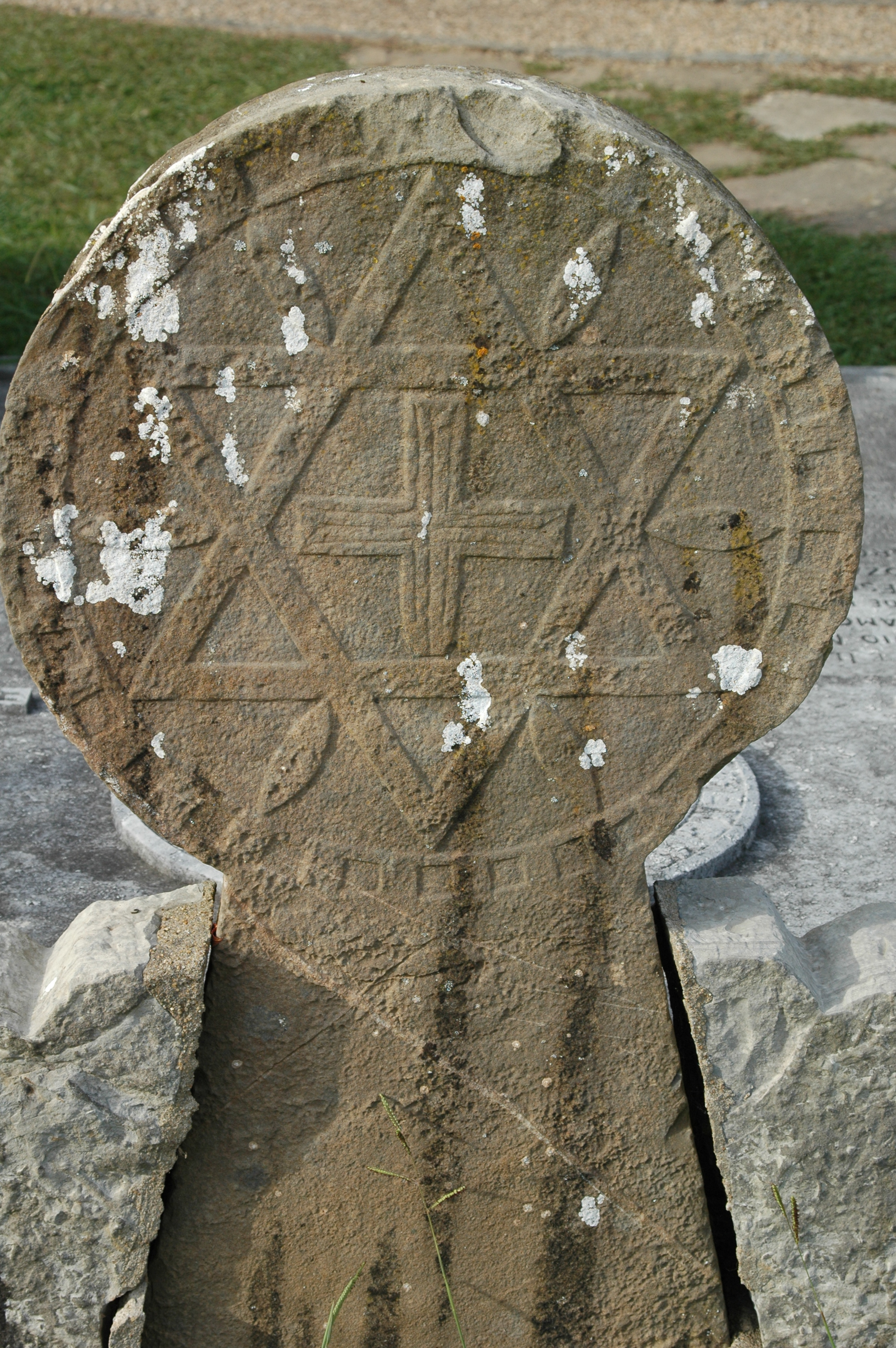
Funerary Stèle

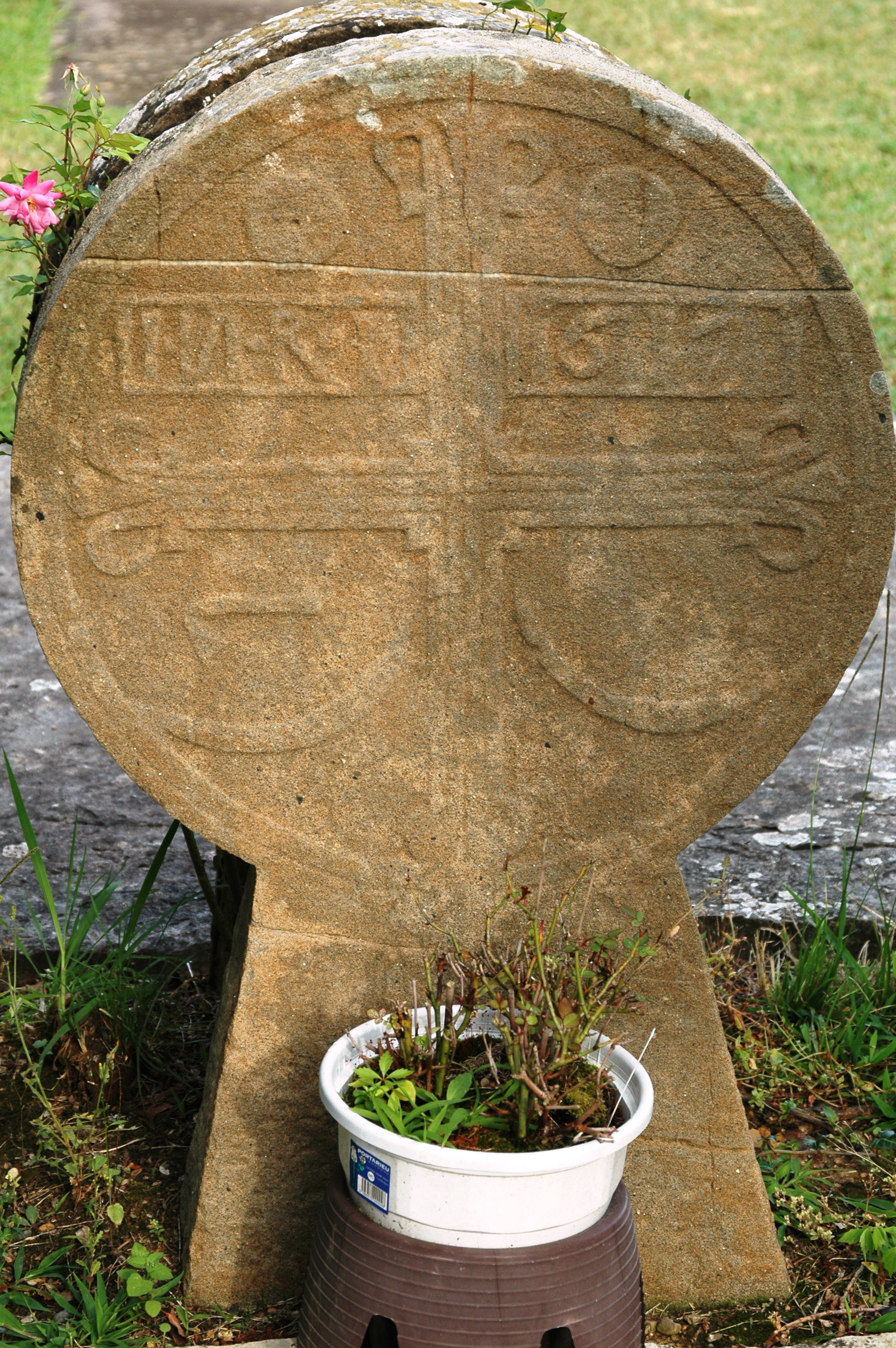
Funerary Stèle

=== Environmental heritage ===
Part of the territory of the commune belongs to the regional natural reserve of Errota Handia managed by the Academy of Natural Areas of Aquitaine who also manage the Chouroumillas (Xurrumilatx) Pond: a wetland located in the north-west of the commune.

== Amenities ==
Sports and sports facilities

Other than the Lau-herri Society for Basque pelota, from where the professional champion Simon Haran originated, community life is organized around the Emak-Hor society which has rugby, handball, gymnastics, marching band, a male chorus (Adixkideak) and a folk group. The Golf course between Arcangues and Arbonne has safeguarded the environmental heritage of the town.

Education

The commune has a primary school.

Health

There is a pharmacy, a dentist, a GP, and physiotherapists.

== Notable people linked to the commune ==
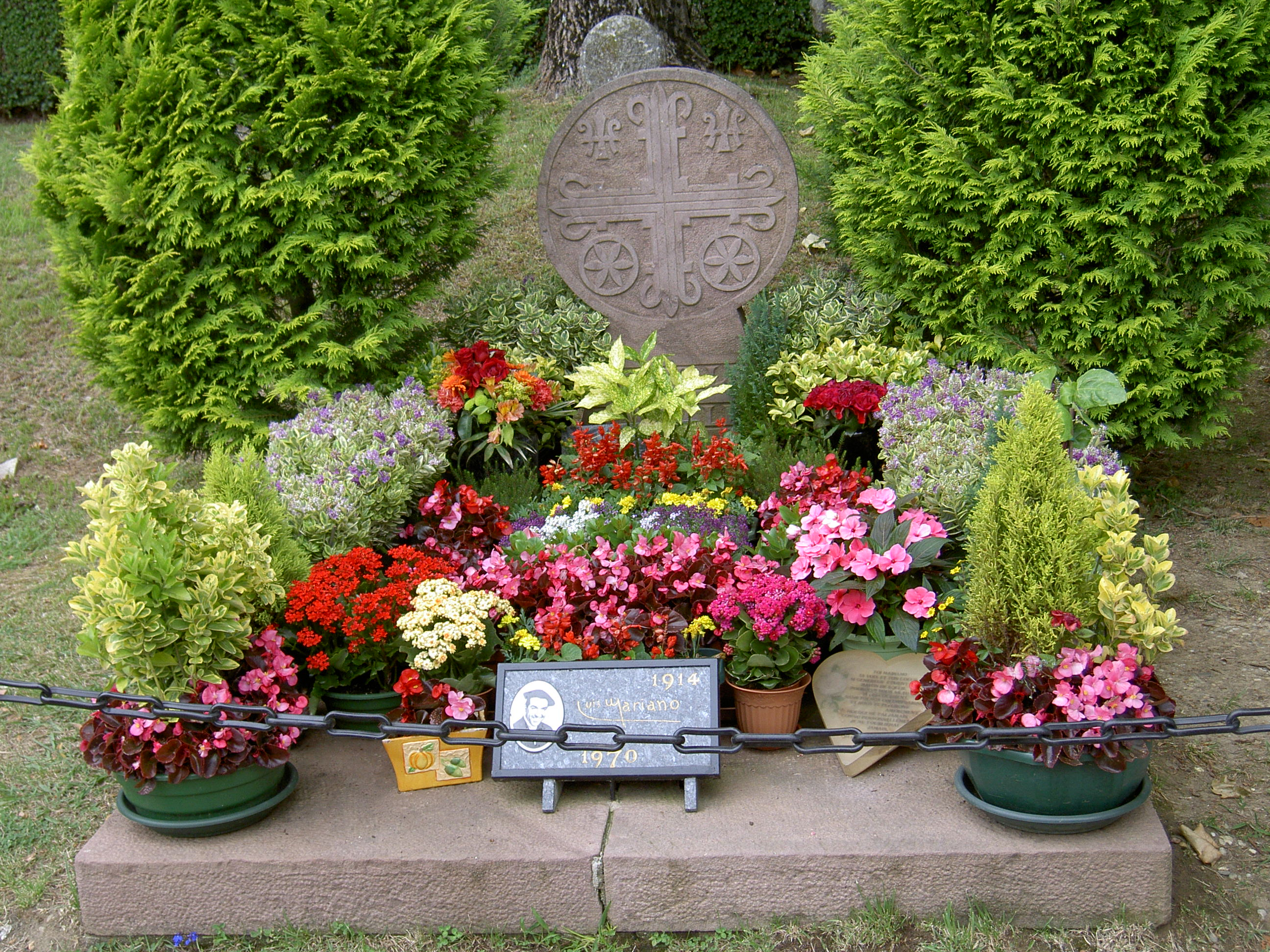
Tomb of Luis Mariano

- Rose d'Arcangues (1793–1817), married Casimir d'Angosse, French politician;
- Jean-Baptiste Mariani, who died 18 January 1890 in Rome and was buried on 2 February in Arcangues, was a French diplomat, Minister Plenipotentiary at Munich in 1882, then Ambassador of France to Rome in 1890;
- André Soulange-Bodin (1855–1937), buried in Arcangues, was a French diplomat and politician, Minister Plenipotentiary at Berlin, then Director of Personnel and of the Secretariat of Foreign Affairs in Paris, Mayor of Arcangues from 1919 to 1929. He was the author of two diplomatic works: The diplomacy of Louis XV and the Family Pact (1894) and The Pre-war Germany in Europe (1918). He founded the Association The Basque House in Paris.
- Henry Soulange-Bodin (1885–1965), son of André Soulange-Bodin, he is also buried in Arcangues. He was a man of letters and a French historian specialising in the chateaux of France.
- Luis Mariano, whose real name was Mariano Eusebio González y García, born in Irun in 1914 and died in Paris in 1970, was a Basque-Spanish tenor. He is buried in the Arcangues cemetery which is regularly invaded by his admirers. A bust representing the singer, sculpted by Paul Belmondo is visible in a commune garden. Luis Mariano built Marionako Borda at Arcangues: a Basque house where he made several visits;
- Gustave Pordea, born 3 February 1916 in Dej (Romania), died 12 August 2002 in Arcangues, was a Franco-Romanian diplomat and politician;
- Micaela Cousiño y Quiñones de León, born in 1938 and spent part of her childhood in Arcangues, was the second wife of Henri d'Orléans - "Count of Paris, Duke of France", Orléanist pretender to the throne of France; she was married religiously at Saint John the Baptist Church of Uhabia on 26 September 2009, twenty-five years after her civil marriage;
- Léopold Eyharts, born in 1957, is an astronaut and French Air Force Brigadier. He lived in Arcangues since childhood.

== See also ==
- Communes of the Pyrénées-Atlantiques department

== Bibliography ==
- Arcangues - Under the direction of Hubert Lamant-Duhart - Ekaina 1986
