= Ustaritz =

Ustaritz Uztaritze (Basque)
- Commune
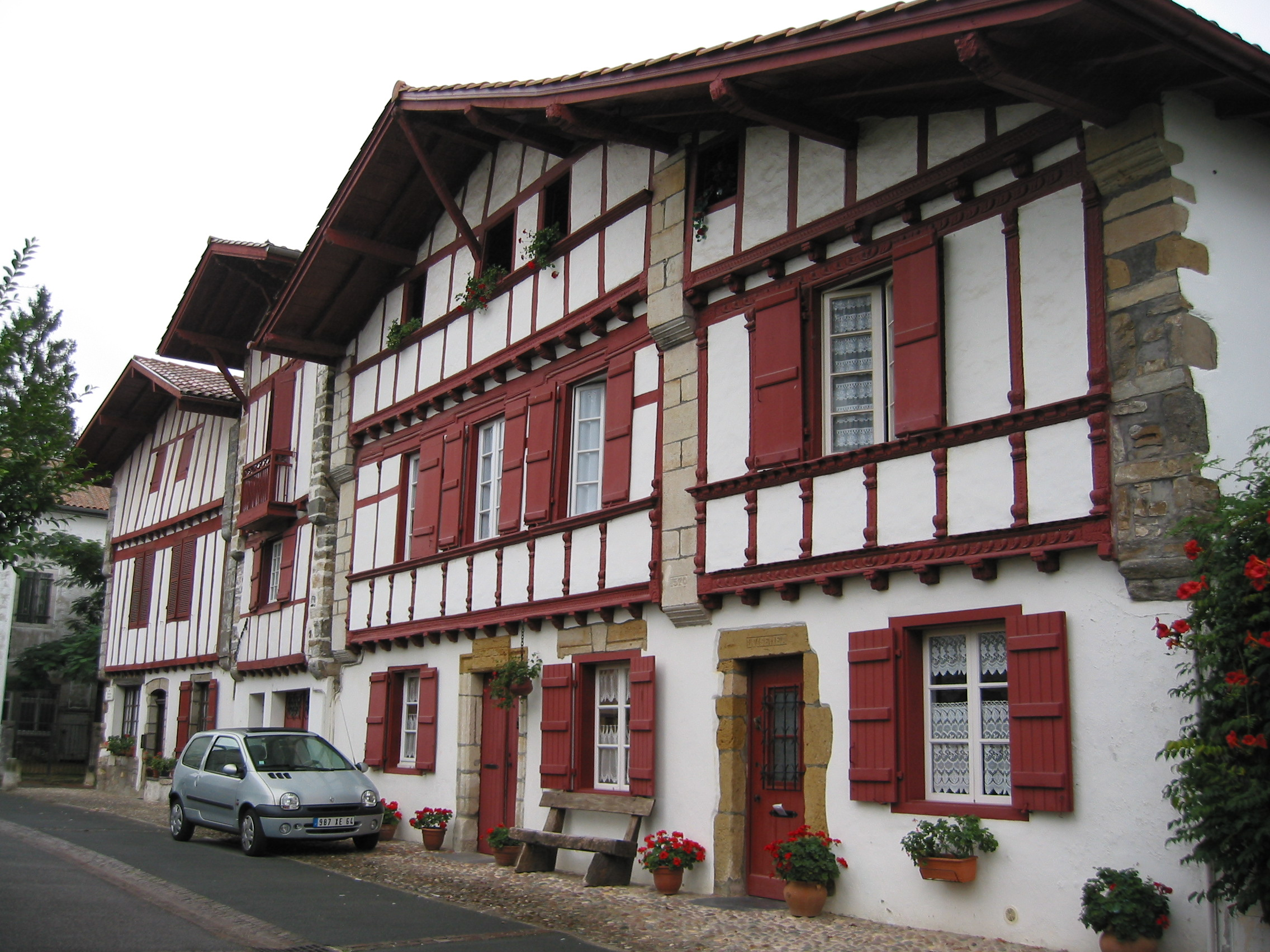
- The former rue des Magistrats
- Location of Ustaritz
- Location within France Location within Nouvelle-Aquitaine
- Coordinates: 43°24′01″N 1°27′19″W
- Country: France
- Region: Nouvelle-Aquitaine
- Department: Pyrénées-Atlantiques
- Arrondissement: Bayonne
- Canton: Ustaritz-Vallées de Nive et Nivelle
- Intercommunality: CA Pays Basque

Government
  - Mayor (2020–2026): Bruno Carrere
- Area^{1}: 32.75 km^{2} (12.64 sq mi)
- Elevation: 9 m (30 ft)
- Highest elevation: 143 m (469 ft)
- Lowest elevation: 0 m (0 ft)
- Population (2023): 7,897
  - Density: 241.1/km^{2} (624.5/sq mi)
- Time zone: UTC+01:00 (CET)
  - Summer (DST): UTC+02:00 (CEST)
- INSEE/Postal code: 64547 /64480
- ^{1} French Land Register data, which excludes lakes, ponds, glaciers > 1 km^{2} (0.386 sq mi or 247 acres) and river estuaries.

Ustaritz (French pronunciation: [ystaʁits]; Basque: Uztaritze) is a town in the traditional Basque province of Labourd, now a commune in the Pyrénées-Atlantiques department, southwestern France. It is located on the river Nive some 13 kilometres (8.1 mi) inland from Bayonne. Ustaritz station has rail connections to Saint-Jean-Pied-de-Port, Cambo-les-Bains and Bayonne.

Ustaritz was the location of the assembly of local Basque leaders before the French Revolution. The 19th-century French playwright and historian Jean-Joseph Ader (1796–1859) was born in Ustaritz.

== Population ==
Historical population
Year	Pop.	±% p.a.
1968	2,477	—
1975	2,841	+1.98%
1982	3,353	+2.40%
1990	4,263	+3.05%
1999	4,984	+1.75%
2007	5,517	+1.28%
2012	6,294	+2.67%
2017	6,822	+1.62%
2023	7,897	+2.47%
Source: INSEE

== See also ==
- Communes of the Pyrénées-Atlantiques department
