= Canton of Bayonne-2 =

Coordinates: 43.50°N 1.45°W

The canton of Bayonne-2 is an administrative division of the Pyrénées-Atlantiques department, southwestern France. It was created at the French canton reorganisation which came into effect in March 2015. Its seat is in Bayonne.

It consists of the following communes:

1. Bayonne (partly)
2. Boucau
