= Canton of Bayonne-3 =

Coordinates: 43.49°N 1.47°W

The canton of Bayonne-3 is an administrative division of the Pyrénées-Atlantiques department, southwestern France. It was created at the French canton reorganisation which came into effect in March 2015. Its seat is in Bayonne.

It consists of the following communes:

1. Bayonne (partly)
