= Bayonne =

Subprefecture of Pyrénées-Atlantiques, Nouvelle-Aquitaine, France

Bayonne: Baiona (Basque); Baiona (Occitan)
- Subprefecture and commune
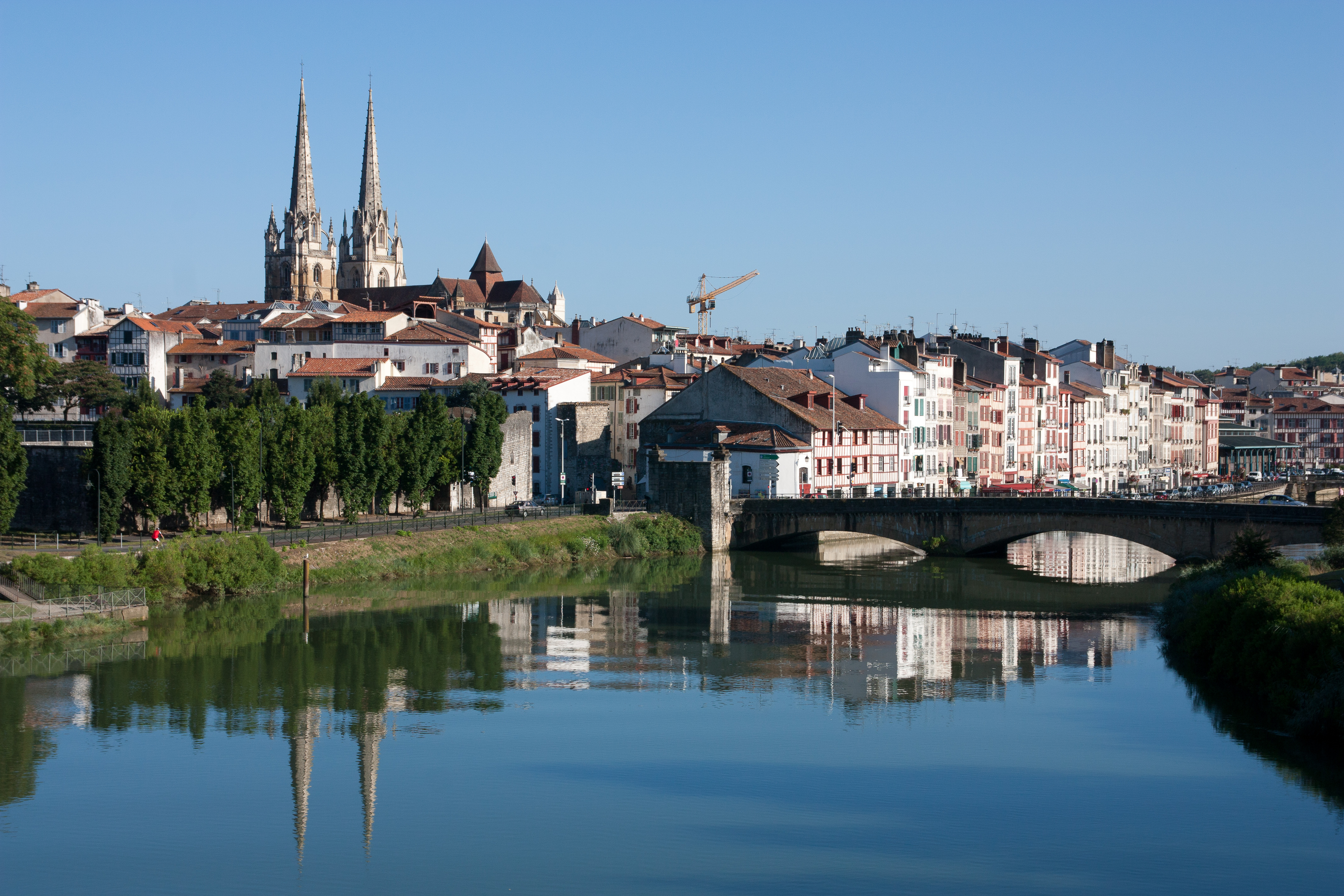
- View of the historic centre

- Flag Coat of arms
- Location of Bayonne
- Location within France Location within Nouvelle-Aquitaine
- Coordinates: 43°29′N 1°29′W
- Country: France
- Region: Nouvelle-Aquitaine
- Department: Pyrénées-Atlantiques
- Arrondissement: Bayonne
- Canton: Bayonne-1, 2 and 3
- Intercommunality: CA Pays Basque

Government
  - Mayor (2020–2026): Jean-René Etchegaray (UDI)
- Area^{1}: 21.68 km^{2} (8.37 sq mi)
- Elevation: 4 m (13 ft)
- Highest elevation: 55 m (180 ft)
- Lowest elevation: 0 m (0 ft)
- Population (2023): 54,306
  - Density: 2,505/km^{2} (6,488/sq mi)
- Demonym: Bayonnais
- Time zone: UTC+01:00 (CET)
  - Summer (DST): UTC+02:00 (CEST)
- INSEE/Postal code: 64102 /64100
- Website: bayonne.fr
- ^{1} French Land Register data, which excludes lakes, ponds, glaciers > 1 km^{2} (0.386 sq mi or 247 acres) and river estuaries.

Bayonne (French: [bajɔn]; Basque and Gascon: Baiona) is a city in southwestern France near the Spanish border. It is a commune and one of two subprefectures in the Pyrénées-Atlantiques department, in the Nouvelle-Aquitaine region, in the area known as the French Basque Country.

Bayonne is located at the confluence of the Nive and Adour rivers, in the northern part of the cultural region of the Basque Country. It is the seat of the Communauté d'agglomération du Pays Basque which roughly encompasses the western half of Pyrénées-Atlantiques, including the coastal city of Biarritz. The area also constitutes the southern part of Gascony, where the Aquitaine Basin joins the beginning of the Pre-Pyrenees.

Together with nearby Anglet, Biarritz, Hendaye and 24 smaller communes, Bayonne forms an urban area with 259,017 inhabitants as of 2022, 53,312 of whom lived in the commune of Bayonne proper. It is also a part of Basque Eurocity Bayonne-San Sebastián.

The site on the left bank of the Nive and the Adour was probably occupied before ancient times; a fortified enclosure was attested to in the 1st century, while the Tarbelli occupied the territory. Archaeological studies have confirmed the presence of a Roman castrum in the 4th and 5th centuries.

In 1023, Bayonne was the capital of Labourd. In the 12th century, it extended to the confluence of the Nive River and beyond. During that time, its first bridge spanning the Adour was built. The city came under English control in 1152 through the marriage of Eleanor of Aquitaine; it became important commercially and, to a lesser degree, militarily thanks to maritime trade. In 1177, Richard the Lion Heart of England took control of the city, separating it from the Viscount of Labourd.

In 1451, the city was taken by the Crown of France after the Hundred Years' War. The loss of trade with the English was followed by the river gradually filling with silt and becoming impassable to ships. As the city developed to the north, its position was weakened compared to earlier times. The district of Saint-Esprit developed initially from settlement by Sephardic Jewish refugees fleeing the Spanish expulsions dictated by the Alhambra Decree. This community brought skill in chocolate making, and Bayonne gained a reputation for chocolate.

The course of the Adour was changed in 1578 by dredging under the direction of Louis de Foix, and the river returned to its former mouth. Bayonne flourished after regaining the maritime trade that it had lost for more than a hundred years. In the 17th century, the city was fortified by Vauban, whose works were followed as models of defense for 100 years. In 1814, Bayonne and its surroundings were the scene of fighting between the Napoleonic troops and the Spanish-Anglo-Portuguese coalition led by the Duke of Wellington. It was the last time the city was under siege.

In 1951, the Lacq gas field was discovered in the region; most of its extracted oil and sulphur are shipped from the port of Bayonne. During the second half of the 20th century, many housing estates were built, forming new districts on the periphery. The city developed to form a conurbation with Anglet and Biarritz; the agglomeration became the heart of a vast Basque-Landes urban area.

Bayonne is the heart of the Communauté d'agglomération du Pays Basque, which covers roughly the western half of the Pyrénées-Atlantiques department. It is an important part of the Basque Bayonne-San Sebastián Eurocity and it plays the role of economic capital of the Adour basin. Modern industries—metallurgy and chemicals—have been established to take advantage of procurement opportunities and sea shipments through the harbour. Business services today represent the largest source of employment. Bayonne is also a cultural capital, a city with strong Basque and Gascon influences, and a rich historical past. Its heritage is expressed in its architecture, the diversity of collections in museums, its gastronomic specialties, and traditional events such as the noted Fêtes de Bayonne.

The inhabitants of the commune are known as Bayonnais or Bayonnaises.

== Toponymy ==
=== Etymology ===
While the modern Basque spelling is Baiona and the same in Gascon Occitan, "the name Bayonne poses a number of problems both historical and linguistic which have still not been clarified". There are different interpretations of its meaning.

The termination -onne in Bayonne can come from many in hydronyms -onne or toponyms derived from that. In certain cases the element -onne follows an Indo-European theme: *wódr (Greek húdōr giving hydro, Gothic watt meaning "water") hence Proto-Celtic *udnā meaning "water" giving unna then onno in the glossary of Vienne. Unna therefore would refer to the Adour. This toponymic type evoking a river traversing a locality is common. The appellative unna seems to be found in the name of the Garonne (Garunna 1st century; Garonna 4th century). However, it is possible to see a pre-Celtic suffix -ona in the name of the Charente (Karantona in 875) or the Charentonne (Carentona in 1050).

It could also be an augmentative Gascon from the original Latin radical Baia- with the suffix -ona in the sense of "vast expanse of water" or a name derived from the Basque bai meaning "river" and ona meaning "good", hence "good river".

The proposal by Eugene Goyheneche repeated by Manex Goyhenetche and supported by Jean-Baptiste Orpustan is bai una, "the place of the river" or bai ona "hill by the river"—Ibai means "river" in Basque and muinoa means "hill".

"It has perhaps been lost from sight that many urban place names in France, from north to south, came from the element Bay- or Bayon- such as: Bayons, Bayonville, Bayonvillers and pose the unusual problem of whether they are Basque or Gascon" adds Pierre Hourmat. However, the most ancient form of Bayonne: Baiona, clearly indicates a feminine or a theme of -a whereas this is not the case for Béon or Bayon. In addition, the Bayon- in Bayonville or Bayonvillers in northern France is clearly the personal Germanic name Baio.

=== Old attestations ===
The names of the Basque province of Labourd and the locality of Bayonne have been attested from an early period with the place name Bayonne appearing in the Latin form Lapurdum after a period during which the two names could in turn designate a Viscounty or Bishopric.

Labourd and Bayonne were synonymous and used interchangeably until the 12th century before being differentiated: Labord for the province and Bayonne for the city. The attribution of Bayonne as Civitas Boatium, a place mentioned in the Antonine Itinerary and by Paul Raymond in his 1863 dictionary, has been abandoned. The city of the Boïates may possibly be La Teste-de-Buch but is certainly not Bayonne. (Note: Achille Luchaire, Annals of the Faculty of Letters of Bordeaux (1879), note 12 and 24, regarding the Notitia Provinciarum mentioning the civitas Boatium (var. Boasium, Bohatium, Boaccensium, Boacium) "whose identification with Bayonne, proposed by Scaliger and Valois, is absolutely inadmissible (see Desjardins, Gaule rom., II, 874, note 1)" (in French).)

The following table details the origins of Labord, Bayonne, and other names in the commune.

Name	Spelling	Date	Source	Page	Origin	Description
Bayonne	Tribunus cohortis Novempopulanoe: Lapurdo		Raymond	24	Notary of Provinces	City
	In provincia Novempopulana tribunus cohortis Novempopulanæ in Lapurdo	fifth century	Goyheneche	85–92		
	Lapurdum	sixth century	Raymond	24	Gregory of Tours	
	Episcopatus Lasburdensis	983	Raymond	88	Chapter	
	Sancta Maria Lasburdensis	983	Raymond	24	Chapter	
	Sancta Maria Baionensis	1105	Raymond	24	Cartulary	
	civitas de Baiona	1140	Raymond	24	Cartulary	
	Baione	13th century	Raymond	24	Duchesne	
	Bayona	1248	Raymond	24	Camara	
	Bayone	1253	Raymond	24	Camara	
	Baionne	14th century	Guiart			
	Bayonne	1750	Cassini 1750			
	Bayonne	1790	Cassini 1790			
	Baiona	19th century	Lhande			
Balichon	Molendinum de la Mufala, Balaisson	1198	Raymond	24	Cartulary	Old mill
	Balaichon	1259	Raymond	24	Cartulary	
	Molin de le Muhale	1259	Raymond	24	Cartulary	
	Molin de la Muffale	1259	Raymond	24	Cartulary	
	lo pont de Belaischon	1259	Raymond	24	Cartulary	
	Baleyson	1331	Raymond	20	Gascon roles	
	Baleychoun	1334	Raymond	20	Gascon roles	
Bénac	Bénac	1863	Raymond	27		Farm
Bouroutchourry	Bouroutchourry	1863	Raymond	35		Farm
Glain	Fons de Coquoanhea	1387	Raymond	72	Chapter	Farm
	Camps	17th century	Raymond	72	Archives of Bayonne	
Jean-d'Amou	Jean-d'Amou	1863	Raymond	85		Hamlet
Lachepaillet	Lo portau de Lachepailhet	1516	Raymond	88	Chapter	District; it was once the name of one of the city gates which was previously called the Portail de Tarride.
Largenté	Largenté	1863	Raymond	94		Farm
Les Lauriers	Les Lauriers	1863	Raymond	97		Hamlet
Lesperon	L'Esperon	1246	Raymond	100	Cartulary	Farm at Saint-Esprit
Les Murailles	Les Murailles	1863	Raymond	120		Farm
Panecau	Port de Bertaco	13th century	Raymond	131	Cartulary	Bridge
Pé-de-Navarre	Pé-de-Navarre	1863	Raymond	133		Farm
Château Weymann	Château Weymann	1863	Raymond	175		Château

Sources:

- Raymond: Topographic Dictionary of the Department of Basses-Pyrenees, 1863, on the page numbers indicated in the table. (in French)
- Goyheneche: according to the Notitia Dignitatum Imperii dating from 340 to 420
- Guiart: Guillaume Guiart, around 1864
- Lhande: Basque-French Dictionary by Pierre Lhande, 1926.
- Cassini 1750: 1750 Cassini Map
- Cassini 1790: 1790 Cassini Map

Origins:

- Chapter: Titles of the Chapter of Bayonne
- Cartulary: Cartulary of Bayonne or Livre d'Or (Book of Gold)
- Camara: Chapters of the Camara de Comptos.

== History ==
=== Prehistory ===
In the absence of accurate objective data there is some credence to the probable existence of a fishing village on the site in a period prior to ancient times. Numerous traces of human occupation have been found in the Bayonne region from the Middle Paleolithic especially in the discoveries at Saint-Pierre-d'Irube, a neighbouring locality. (Note: Neanderthal Stone tools (from 80,000 to 45,000 BC corresponding to the Mousterian period, the Riss Glaciations, and Würm II)) On the other hand, the presence of a mound about 14 metres (46 feet) high has been detected in the current Cathedral Quarter overlooking the Nive, which formed a natural protection and a usable port on the left bank of the Nive. At the time, the mound was surrounded north and west by the Adour swamps. At its foot lies the famous "Bayonne Sea"—the junction of the two rivers—which may have been about 1,200 metres (3,900 feet) wide between Saint-Esprit and the Grand Bayonne and totally covered the current location of Bourg-Neuf (in the district of Petit Bayonne). To the south, the last bend of the Nive widens near the Saint-Léon hills. Despite this, the narrowing of the Adour valley allows easier crossing than anywhere else along the entire length of the estuary.

In conclusion, the strategic importance of this height was so obvious it must be presumed that it has always been inhabited.

=== Ancient times ===
Map of Novempopulania indicating the position of the Tarbelli territory north-west of the Pyrenees

The oldest documented human occupation site is located on a hill overlooking the Nive and its confluence with the Adour.

In the 1st century AD, during the Roman occupation, Bayonne already seems to have been of some importance since the Romans surrounded the city with a wall to keep out the Tarbelli, Aquitani, or the proto-Basque who then occupied a territory that extended south of modern-day Landes, to the modern French Basque country, the Chalosse, the valleys of the Adour, the mountain streams of Pau, Pyrénées-Atlantiques, and to the Gave d'Oloron.

The archaeological discoveries of October and November 1995 provided a shred of evidence to support this projection. In the four layers of sub-soil along the foundation of the Gothic cathedral (in the "apse of the cathedral" area), a 2-metre depth was found of old objects from the end of the 1st century—in particular sigillated Gallic ceramics from Montans imitating Italian styles, thin-walled bowls, and fragments of amphorae. (Note: Sigillata ceramics of red brick colour, the resulting relief decoration is decorated before firing by stamping) In the "southern sector" near the cloister door, there were objects from the second half of the 1st century as well as coins from the first half of the 3rd century.

A very high probability of human presence, not solely military, seems to provisionally confirm the occupation of the site at least around the third century.

A Roman castrum dating to the end of the 4th century has been proven as a fortified place of Novempopulania. Named Lapurdum, the name became the name of the province of Labourd. (Note: The Notitia Dignitatum imperii Romani, dating from 340 to 420 AD, mentions the seat of the tribune of the cohort of Novempopulania in these terms: "In provincia Novempopulana tribunus cohortis Novempopulanae Lapurdo") According to Eugene Goyheneche, the name Baiona designated the city, the port, and the cathedral while that of Lapurdum was only a territorial designation. This Roman settlement was strategic as it allowed the monitoring of the trans-Pyrenean roads and of local people rebellious to the Roman power. The construction covered 6 to 10 hectares according to several authors. (Note: Gérard Coulon, The Gallo-Romains: life, work, beliefs, diversions—54 BC – 486 AD, Paris, 2006, Errance, Hespérides collection, ISBN 2-87772-331-3, p. 21 (in French), retains the number 10 hectares.) (Note: According to Eugène Goyheneche in Basque Country: Soule, Labourd, Lower Navarre, Société nouvelle d’éditions régionales et de diffusion, Pau, 1979, BnF FRBNF34647711, the old Roman wall which is still visible in parts was in the shape of a polygon of 1,125 metres (3,691 feet) perimeter in an area of 6 to 9 hectares (15–22 acres).)

=== Middle Ages ===
The geographical location of the locality at the crossroads of a river system oriented from east to west and the road network connecting Europe to the Iberian Peninsula from north to south, predisposed the site to the double role of fortress and port. (Note: p. 149.) The city, after being Roman, alternated between the Vascones and the English for three centuries from the 12th to the 15th century.

The Romans left the city in the 4th century and the Basques, who had always been present, dominated the former Novempopulania province between the Garonne, the Ocean, and the Pyrénées. Novempopulania was renamed Vasconia and then Gascony after a Germanic deformation (resulting from the Visigoth and Frankish invasions). Basquisation of the plains region was too weak against the advance of romanization. From the mixture between the Basque and Latin language Gascon was created.

Documentation on Bayonne for the period from the High Middle Ages are virtually nonexistent, (Note: Peter Hourmat, (History of Bayonne from its origins to the French Revolution of 1789, Society of Sciences Letters Arts of Bayonne,1986, pp. 27 to 35 (in French))deplores the lack of sources for the period 5th century to the 10th century: "If the existence of a major military site is attested by the remains of the tower walls of a castrum, the headquarters or refuge of a cohort in the last days of the Roman Empire, in the half a millennium that followed the collapse of the latter plunges us into an almost total ignorance of who occupied the area of the castrum and the identity of the people. A heavy silence covers the fate of Lapurdum and documents at our disposal for five centuries can be counted on the fingers of one hand and these lead to different or contradictory interpretations ... . So this story becomes a long series of question marks, for example that of Novempopulania".) (Note: The Treaty of Andelot signed in 587 between Guntram, king of Burgundy, and Brunhilda of Austrasia, mentions Lapurdo; it documents the return to Brunhilda of several cities including Aire, Couserans and Lapurdo, each "with its territories" ("cum terminibus"). Manex Goyhenetche indicates that in the 6th century, the term civitas was used to designate a fortress. "The Frankish dynasties of Austrasia and Neustria by the Treaty of Andelot, consolidated their grip on part of the former territory of the Nine Peoples [...] In the 4th century Lapurdum continued to exist and by the end of the 6th century returned to its function as a fortress. Lapurdum controlled firstly the routes leading to the Pyrenean passes and secondly the cabotage routes of the Frankish fleets from Bordeaux to Asturias ".) with the exception of two Norman intrusions: one questionable in 844 and a second attested in 892. (Note: p. 152.)

When Labourd was created in 1023, Bayonne was the capital and the Viscount resided there. (Note: The Vicount resided in Chatelet (lou Castet), next to the entry to the current Cinq Cantons (Five Cantons) which was the Roman gate leading to the port source: Eugene Goyheneche, The Basque Country: Soule, Labourd, Lower Navarre, New Society regional editions and distribution, Pau, 1979 (Record BNF FRBNF34647711).) The history of Bayonne proper started in 1056 when Raymond II the Younger, Bishop of Bazas, had the mission to build the Church of Bayonne (Note: It can be deduced that it existed prior to that date.)

The construction was under the authority of Raymond III of Martres, Bishop of Bayonne from 1122 to 1125, combined with Viscount Bertrand for the Romanesque cathedral, the rear of which can still be seen today, and the first wooden bridge across the Adour extending the Mayou bridge over the Nive, which inaugurated the heyday of Bayonne. From 1120, new districts were created under population pressure. The development of areas between the old Roman city of Grand Bayonne and the Nive also developed during this period, then between the Nive and the Adour at the place that became Petit Bayonne. A Dominican Order Convent was located there in 1225 then that of the Cordeliers in 1247. Construction of and modifications to the defences of the city also developed to protect the new districts. (Note: p. 152.)

In 1130, the King of Aragon Alfonso the Battler besieged the city without success. Bayonne became an Angevin possession when Eleanor of Aquitaine married Henry Plantagenet, the future king of England, in 1152. This alliance gave Bayonne many commercial privileges. The Bayonnaises became carriers of Bordeaux wines and other south-western products like resin, ham, and woad to England. (Note: p. 171.) Bayonne was then an important military base. In 1177, King Richard separated the Viscounty of Labourd whose capital then became Ustaritz. Like many cities at the time, in 1215 Bayonne obtained the award of a municipal charter and was emancipated from feudal powers.

The official publication, in 1273, of a Coutume unique to the city, remained in force for five centuries until the separation of Bayonne from Labourd. (Note: p. 160.) (Note: Relations with Labourd were often difficult and caused many bloody conflicts. The most famous of them took place in 1343 when the mayor of Bayonne, Pé de Poyane, killed five labourdin nobles: an episode which, according to Eugene Goyheneche, had its origin in a fictional story of On the Proudines bridge at Villefranque, retold by Augustine Chaho and Hippolyte Taine.)

In 1371 Constance of Castile daughter of the murdered King Pedro the Cruel took refuge with the English in Bayonne, leading to her marriage to John of Gaunt and his claim to the Castilian throne.

Bayonnaise industry at that time was dominated by shipbuilding: wood (oak, beech, chestnut from the Pyrenees, and pine from Landes) being overabundant. (Note: p. 162.) There was also maritime activity in providing crews for whaling, commercial marine or, and it was often so at a time when it was easy to turn any merchant ship into a warship, the English Royal Navy. (Note: p. 163.) (Note: For example a Bayonnais fleet participated in the Siege of Calais led by the English in 1346 which consisted of 15 vessels and 439 men source: Eugene Goyheneche, The Basque Country: Soule, Labourd, Lower Navarre, Society new regional editions and distribution, Pau,1979 (Record BNF FRBNF34647711), p. 163. (in French).)

=== Renaissance and modern times ===
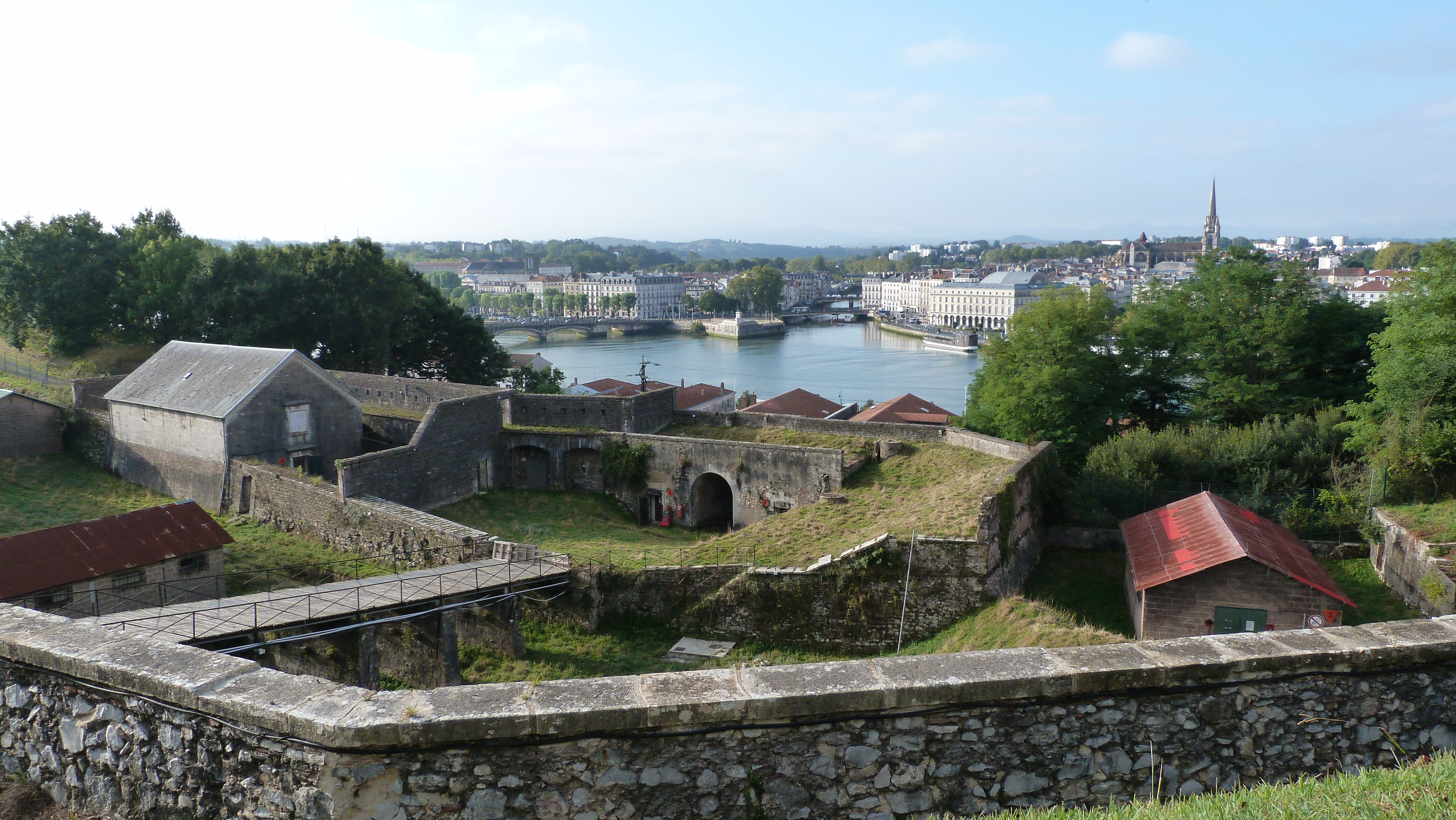
View of the ramparts overlooking the river

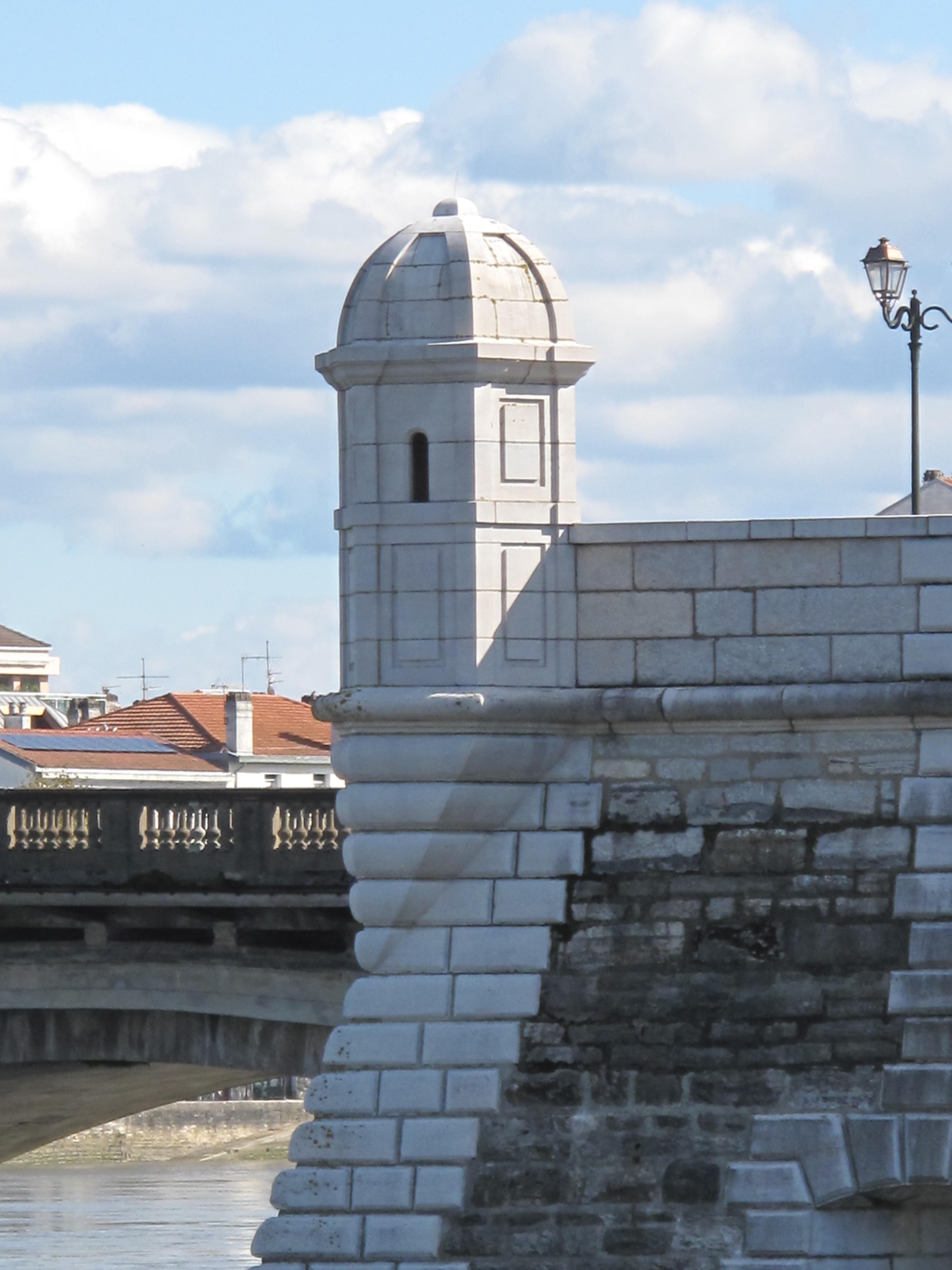
The Bartizan on the Redoubt, restored in 2005

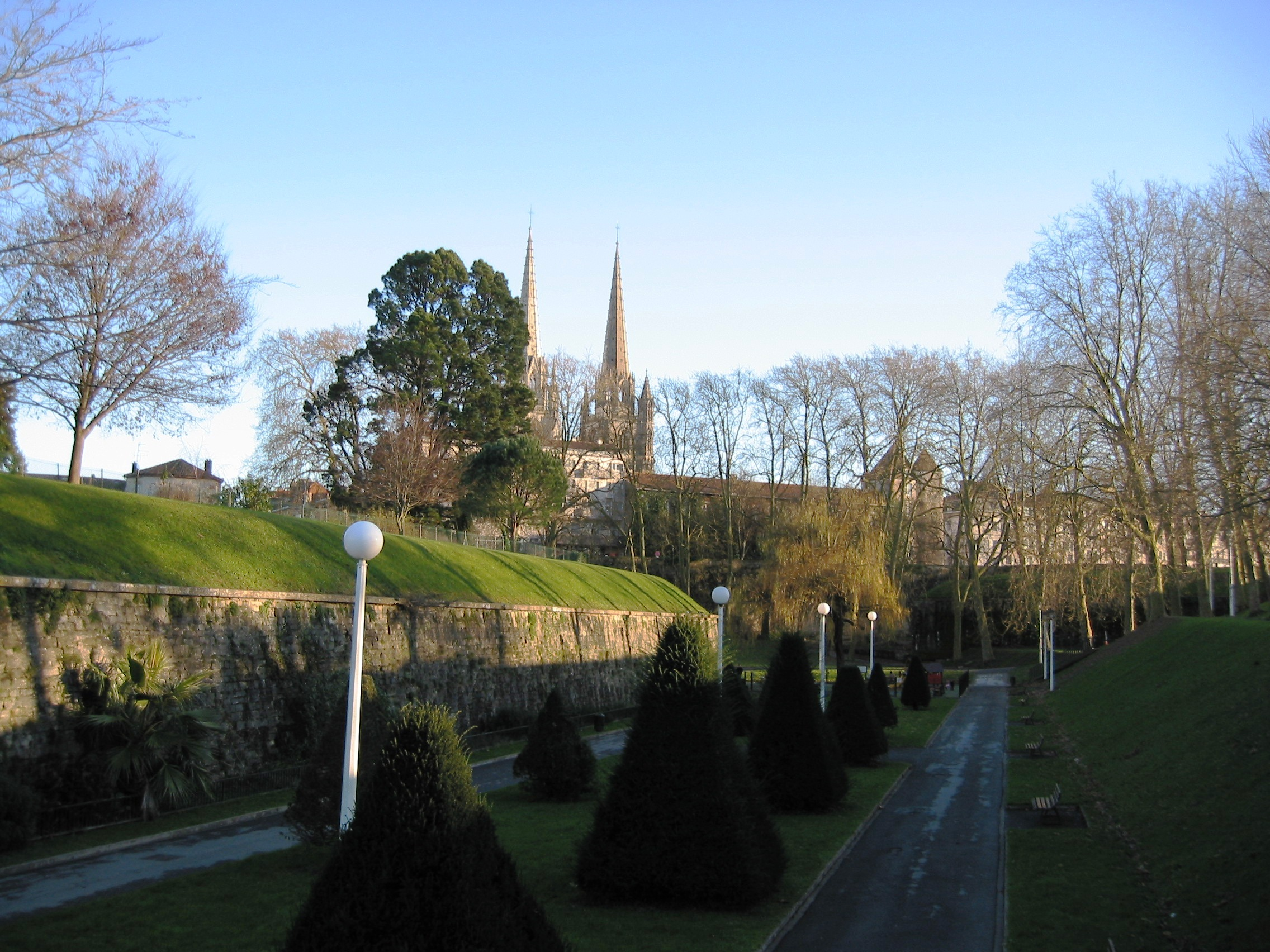
The ramparts of Bayonne

Jean de Dunois – a former companion at arms of Joan of Arc—captured the city on 20 August 1451 and annexed it to the Crown "without making too many victims", but at the cost of a war indemnity of 40,000 gold Écus payable in a year, (Note: p. 159.)—thanks to the opportunism of the bishop who claimed to have seen "a large white cross surmounted by a crown which turns into a fleur-de-lis in the sky" to dissuade Bayonne from fighting against the royal troops. (Note: The siege lasted nine days from 12 to 20 August 1451 according to Pierre Hourmat, History of Bayonne origins to the French Revolution of 1789, Society of Arts Science & Arts of Bayonne,1986, p. 143.) (Note: p. 142.)

The city continued to be fortified by the kings of France to protect it from danger from the Spanish border. In 1454, Charles VII created a separate judicial district: the Seneschal of Lannes a "single subdivision of Guyenne during the English period" which had jurisdiction over a wide area including Bayonne, Dax and Saint-Sever and which exercised civil justice, criminal jurisdiction within the competence of the district councilors. Over time, the "Seneschal of the Sword", which was at Dax, lost any role other than protocol, and Bayonne, along with Dax and Saint-Sever, became the de facto seat of a separate Seneschal under the authority of a "lieutenant-general of the Seneschal". (Note: p. 160.)

In May 1462, King Louis XI authorized the holding of two annual fairs (Note: Two annual fairs: one on the first day of Lent and the other 1 August: "[...] grant them free fairs in perpetuity of all Aydes, imposicions, impostz and any other subsidies qualxconques, which one will be held the first day of karesme and the other on the first day of August [...]" as letters patent of Louis XI established at Montferrand in May 1462.) by letters patent after signing the Treaty of Bayonne after which it was confirmed by the coutoumes of the inhabitants in July 1472 following the death of Charles de Valois, Duke de Berry, the king's brother. (Note: p. 164.)

At the time the Spanish Inquisition raged in the Iberian Peninsula, Spanish and Portuguese Jews fled Spain and also later, Portugal, then settled in Southern France, including in Saint-Esprit (Pyrénées-Atlantiques), a northern district of Bayonne located along the northern bank of the Adour river. They brought with them chocolate and the recipe for its preparation. In 1750, the Jewish population in Saint-Esprit (Pyrénées-Atlantiques) is estimated to have reached about 3,500 people.

The golden age of the city ended in the 15th century with the loss of trade with England and the silting of the port of Bayonne created by the movement of the course of the Adour to the north. (Note: p. 187.)

At the beginning of the 16th century Labourd suffered the emergence of the plague. Its path can be tracked by reading the Registers. In July 1515, the city of Bayonne was "prohibited to welcome people from plague-stricken places" and on 21 October, "we inhibit and prohibit all peasants and residents of this city [...] to go Parish Bidart [...] because of the contagion of the plague". On 11 April 1518, the plague raged in Saint-Jean-de-Luz and the city of Bayonne "inhibited and prohibited for all peasants and city inhabitants and other foreigners to maintain relationships at the location and Parish of Saint-Jean-de-Luz where people have died of the plague". On 11 November 1518, the plague was present in Bayonne to the point that in 1519 the city council moved to the district of Brindos (Berindos at the time) in Anglet.

In 1523, Marshal Odet of Foix, Viscount of Lautrec resisted the Spaniards under Philibert of Chalon in the service of Charles V and lifted the siege of Bayonne. It was at Château-Vieux that the ransom demand for the release of Francis I, taken prisoner after his defeat at the Battle of Pavia, was gathered. (Note: Francis I was replaced as a captive by his two eldest sons: Francis III, Duke of Brittany, and Henry II of France who were finally released in 1530 after payment of the ransom.)

The meeting in 1565 between Catherine de Medici and the envoy of Philip II: the Duke of Alba, is known as the Interview of Bayonne. At the time that Catholics and Protestants tore each other apart in parts of the kingdom of France, Bayonne seemed relatively untouched by these troubles. An iron fist from the city leaders did not appear to be unknown. In fact, they never hesitated to use violence and criminal sanctions for keeping order in the name of the "public good". Two brothers, Saubat and Johannes Sorhaindo who were both lieutenants of the mayor of Bayonne in the second half of the 16th century, perfectly embody this period. They often wavered between Catholicism and Protestantism but always wanted to ensure the unity and prestige of the city.

In the 16th century, the king's engineers, under the direction of Louis de Foix, were dispatched to rearrange the course of the Adour by creating an estuary to maintain the river bed. The river discharged in the right place to the Ocean on 28 October 1578. (Note: p. 214.) The port of Bayonne then attained a greater level of activity. Fishing for cod and whale ensured the wealth of fishermen and shipowners.

From 1611 to 1612, the college Principal of Bayonne was a man of 26 years old with a future: Cornelius Jansen known as Jansénius, the future Bishop of Ypres. Bayonne became the birthplace of Jansenism, an austere science which strongly disrupted the monarchy of Louis XIV.

During the sporadic conflicts that troubled the French countryside from the mid 17th century, Bayonne peasants were short of powder and projectiles. They attached the long hunting knives in the barrels of their muskets and that way they fashioned makeshift spears later called bayonets. In that same century, Vauban was charged by Louis XIV to fortify the city. He added a citadel built on a hill overlooking the district of San Espirit Cap deou do Punt.

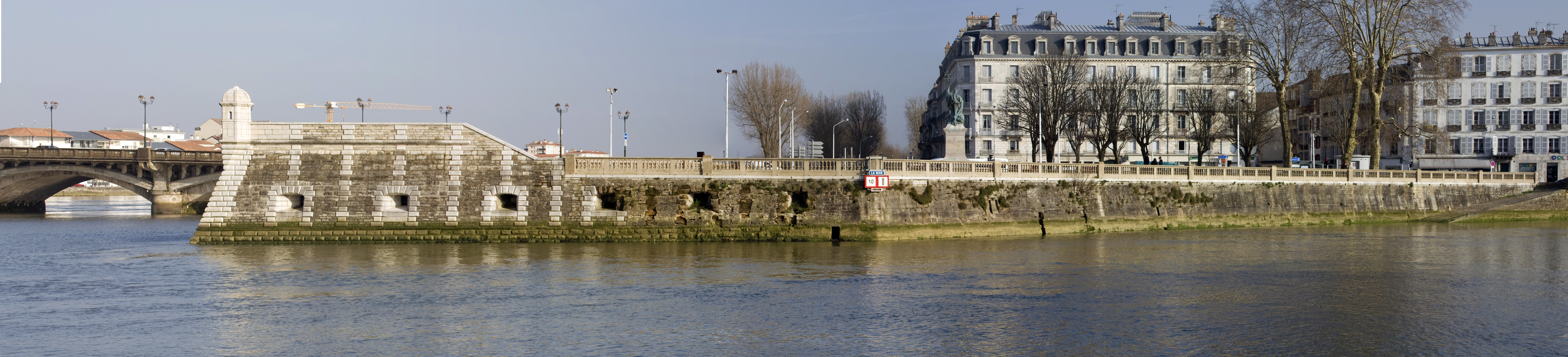
The Redoubt, a system of fortifications destroyed at the beginning of the 20th century, seen from the Quai de l'Amiral-Lesseps

=== French Revolution and Empire ===
Activity in Bayonne peaked in the 18th century. The Chamber of Commerce was founded in 1726. Trade with Spain, the Netherlands, the Antilles, the cod fishery off the shores of Newfoundland, and construction sites maintained a high level of activity in the port. (Note: p. 511.)

In 1792, the district of Saint-Esprit (that revolutionaries renamed Port-de-la-Montagne) located on the right bank of the Adour, was separated from the city and renamed Jean-Jacques Rousseau. It was reunited with Bayonne on 1 June 1857. For 65 years, the autonomous commune was part of the department of Landes.

In 1808, at the Château of Marracq, the act of abdication of the Spanish king Charles IV in favour of Napoleon was signed under the "friendly pressure" of the Emperor. In the process, the Bayonne Statute was initialed as the first Spanish constitution. (Note: p. 417.)

Also in 1808, the French Empire imposed on the Duchy of Warsaw the Convention of Bayonne to buy from France the debts owed to it by Prussia. The debt, amounting to more than 43 million francs in gold, was bought at a discounted rate of 21 million francs. However, although the duchy made its payments in installments to France over a four-year period, Prussia was unable to pay it (due to a very large indemnity it owed to France resulting from the Treaties of Tilsit), causing the Polish economy to suffer heavily.

Trade was the wealth of the city in the 18th century but suffered greatly in the 19th century, severely sanctioned by conflict with Spain, its historic trading partner in the region. The Siege of Bayonne marked the end of the period with the surrender of the Napoleonic troops of Marshal Jean-de-Dieu Soult who were defeated by the coalition led by Wellington on 5 May 1814. (Note: p. 418.)

=== 19th and 20th centuries ===
In 1854, the railway arrived from Paris bringing many tourists eager to enjoy the beaches of Biarritz. Bayonne turned instead to the steel industry with the forges of the Adour. (Note: The Forges of the Adour were actually located in the commune of Boucau on the right bank of the river.) The Port took on an industrial look but its slow decline seemed inexorable in the 19th century. The discovery of the Lacq gas field restored a certain dynamism.

The Treaty of Bayonne was concluded on 2 December 1856. It overcame the disputes in fixing the Franco-Spanish border in the area extending from the mouth of the Bidassoa to the border between Navarre and Aragon.

Arms of Bayonne	Paul Raymond noted in 1863 that the arms of the city were blazoned: Azure, a tower embattled and ramparted of Argent, wavy proper in base, cantoned to dexter with a letter N crowned of Or, between two pines Vert each fructed of seven Or and set with fruit pal, debruised by two lions langued confronting. The current arms are Blazoned: (Note: This blazon was effective 3 August 1919, by the municipal council of the city of Bayonne, quoted by René Broca in the preface of the book History of Bayonne from its origins to the French Revolution of 1789, Pierre Hourmat, Corporation Sciences Humanities & Arts, Bayonne, 1986) Gules, a tower turreted of Or, masooned, windowed, and porte of Sable on a sea wavy of Azure, Or and Sable in base and surmounted by a fleur-de-lis of Or, between two oaks proper fructed seven of Or debruised by two lions langued confronting of Or; the arms stamped with a county crown.

The city built three light railway lines to connect to Biarritz at the beginning of the 20th century. The most direct line, that of the Tramway Bayonne-Lycée–Biarritz was operated from 1888 to 1948. In addition, a line further north served Anglet, operated by the Chemin de fer Bayonne-Anglet-Biarritz company from 1877 to 1953. Finally, a line following the Adour to its mouth and to the Atlantic Ocean by the bar in Anglet, was operated by VFDM réseau basque from 1919 to 1948.

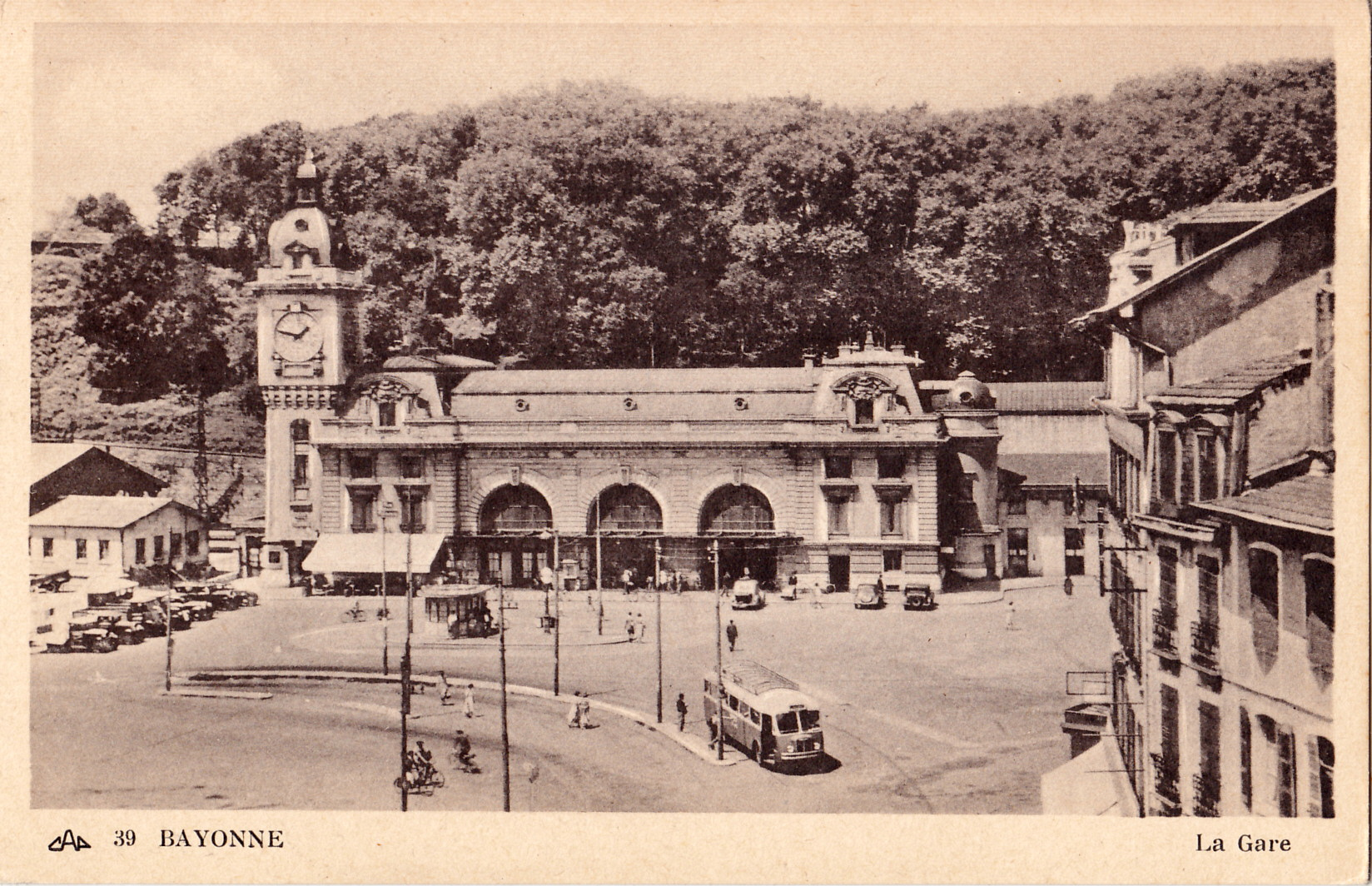
The second Gare de Bayonne, photographed here in the 1930s (Note: The second Gare de Bayonne succeeded an earlier station made of wood and metal built in 1854 at the beginning of the 20th century.)

On the morning of 23 December 1933, sub-prefect Anthelme received Gustave Tissier, the director of the Crédit Municipal de Bayonne. He responded well, with some astonishment, to his persistent interview. It did not surprise him to see the man unpacking what became the scam of the century.

"Tissier, director of the Crédit Municipal, was arrested and imprisoned under suspicion of forgery and misappropriation of public funds. He had issued thousands of false bonds in the name of Crédit Municipal [...]" (Note: It was in these terms that the newspaper Le Courrier de Bayonne recounted the event a few days later.)

This was the beginning of the Stavisky Affair which, together with other scandals and political crises, led to the Paris riots of 6 February 1934.

=== The World Wars ===
The 249th Infantry Regiment, created from the 49th Infantry Regiment, was engaged in operations in the First World War, including action at Chemin des Dames, especially on the plateau of Craonne. 700 Bayonnaises perished in the conflict. (Note: The Courrier de Bayonne of 8 August 1914 described the departure of the Regiment in the following terms: "[...] As for the trains which carried our brave little poilus of the 49th, they were adorned with flowers. On the wagons were pleasant or patriotic inscriptions. We noted the following: "Pleasure Train for Berlin, out and back"; on others: "Vive la France! Long live England ! Long live Russia !" were framed by garlands and on the locomotives were the flags of the three countries fraternally chattering in the wind ... If the Germans saw it, perhaps they would not be very sure of victory. [...]" (Source: Maurice Sacx, Bayonne and the Basque Country—Witnesses of history, Biarritz, Basque Museum of Bayonne, 1968).) A centre for engagement of foreign volunteers was established in August 1914, in Bayonne. Many nationalities were represented, particularly the Spanish, the Portuguese, the Czechs, (Note: The Avenue of the Czech Legion in Bayonne is in their honour.) and the Poles. (Note: The Polish company was cited in an order of the Army dated 21 June 1918, by General Petain (source: François Lafitte Houssat, Bayonne Nive and Adour, Joue-les-Tours, Alan Sutton, 2001 (ISBN 2-84253-557-X)).)

During the Second World War, Bayonne was occupied by the 3rd SS Panzer Division Totenkopf from 27 June 1940 to 23 August 1944.

On 5 April 1942, the Allies made a landing attempt in Bayonne but after a barge penetrated the Adour with great difficulty, the operation was cancelled.

On 21 August 1944, after blowing up twenty ships in port, German troops withdrew. On the 22nd, a final convoy of five vehicles passed through the city. It transported Gestapo Customs agents and some elements of the Feldgendarmerie. One or more Germans opened fire with machine guns killing three people. (Note: The shooting took place at the Saint-Léon crossroads near the train station and near the citadel.) On the 23rd, there was an informal and immediate installation of a "special municipal delegation" by the young deputy prefect Guy Lamassoure representing the Provisional Government of the French Republic which had been established in Algiers since 27 June.

== Policy and administration ==
=== List of mayors under the Ancien Régime ===
The Gramont family provided captains and governors in Bayonne from 1472 to 1789 as well as mayors, a post which became hereditary from 28 January 1590 by concession of Henry IV to Antoine II of Gramont. From the 15th century, they resided in the Château Neuf then in the Château-Vieux from the end of the 16th century: (Note: The Château-Neuf was completed in 1507 by Roger de Gramont.)

- Roger de Gramont, (1444–1519), Lord of Gramont, Baron of Haux, Seneschal of Guyenne, hereditary mayor of Bayonne. He was an advisor and chamberlain of Louis XI in 1472 and then Charles VIII in 1483. He was Ambassador for Louis XII in Rome in 1502. He became governor of Bayonne and its castles on 26 February 1487. He died of the plague in 1519.
- Jean II de Gramont, Lord of Gramont, mayor and captain of Bayonne from 18 March 1523. On 15 September 1523, as a lieutenant in the company of Marshal Lautrec, he rescued Bayonne from the siege by the forces of Charles V under the command of the Prince of Orange. He died during the wars in Italy;
- Antoine I of Gramont, born in 1526, he was appointed at the age of nine years (1535) as mayor and captain of Bayonne. In 1571, he charged Louis de Foix with the changes to the mouth of the Adour along the fortifications of the city;
- Antoine II de Gramont (1572–1644), Count of Gramont, Guiche and Toulonjon, Viscount then Count of Louvigny, ruler of Bidache, Viscount of Aster, lord then baron of Lescun. He was a Duke de Brevet in 1643, but unverified by Parliament. On 28 January 1590, Henry IV granted him and his descendants the perpetual office of Mayor of Bayonne. He then became the Viceroy of Navarre. In 1595, Antoine II de Gramont charged Jean Errard (1599) then Louis de Millet (1612) to strengthen the defenses of the city;
- Antoine III of Gramont-Touloujon (1604–1678), Count and then, in 1648, Duke of Gramont, Prince of Bidache, Count of Guiche, Toulonjon, and Louvigny, Viscount of Astern, Baron of Andouins and Hagetmau, and lord of Lesparre, peer of France in 1648, Marshal of France in 1641. As Ambassador of Louis XIV, in 1660 he sought the hand of the Infanta Maria Theresa. The king gave him power of attorney to represent him in the marriage which was celebrated in Madrid. It was he who welcomed Louis XIV, Anne of Austria, Mazarin, and the rest of the Court to Bayonne. He died on 12 July 1678 at the Château-Vieux;
- Antoine Charles IV of Gramont (1641–1720), Duke of Gramont, Prince of Bidache, Count of Guiche and Louvigny, Viscount of Aster, Baron of Andouins and Hagetmau, Lord of Lesparre, peer of France, Viceroy of Navarre. In 1689, he continued the fortification works undertaken by Vauban in Bayonne, where he remained from 1706 to 1712. He supported Philip V during the War of the Spanish Succession, using Bayonne to supply his troops, weapons, reinforcements and subsidies. In retaliation, the opponents of Philip V organized two attacks in 1707: one at Château-Vieux leaving Antoine IV unharmed.

=== Modern times ===
List of Successive Mayors

Mayors from 1725 to 1941

From	To	Name
1725		Matthieu de Bruix
1726		Jean de Moracin
1728		François de Poheyt
1730		Léon Dubrocq
1732		Pierre Commarieu
1736		Jean Desbiey
1738		Jean-Louis Rol Montpellier
1740		Joseph Dulivier
1745		Léon Brethous
1749		Joseph Dantes
1750		Dominique Behic
1752		François Casaubon Maisonneuve
1754		Jean Baptiste Picot
1756		Martin Bretous
1758		Jean Desbiey
1760		Jean François Dubrocq
1762		Jean Rol de Montpellier
1764		Martin Antoine Bretous
1766		Jacques Pastoureau
1768		Joseph de Sorhainde
1770		Martin Castera
1772		Pierre Larue
1774		Dominique Duhagon
1775		Jean-Pierre de Nogué
1776		Lasserre
1778		Pierre Anselme Monho
1780		Joachim Dubrocq
1782		Etienne Lalanne
1785		Joseph Verdier
1788		Jacques Poydenot
1790		Dominique Dubrocq
1791		Charles Lasserre
1791		Paul Faurie
1792		Jean-Pierre Joseph de Basterrèche
1793		Leclerc
1794		Johaneau
1795		Dufourcq
1798		Barthélémy Poydenot
1798		Sauvine
1800		Paum Lacroix Ravignan
1803	1806	Joseph Laborde Noguez
1806		Chrysostome Dechegaray
1815		Martin Charles Chégaray
1816		Arnaud Fourcade
1818		Alexandre Betbeder
1824		Antoine Robert d'Hirairt
1829		Joachim Alexandre Dubrocq
1830	1832	Bernard Lanne
1832	1833	Joseph Arnaud Eugène de Basterreche
1833	1848	François Balasque
1848	1849	Eugène Boutouey
1849	1850	Joachim Alexandre Dubrocq
1852	1869	Jules Labat
1871	1876	Jules Séraphin Chateauneuf
1876	1881	Jacques Théodore Plantié
1881	1884	Edouard Séraphin Haulon
1884	1885	Jacques Léon Portes
1885	1888	Joseph Edouard Viard
1888	1908	Gabriel Léo Pouzac
1908	1919	Joseph Garat
1919	1925	Jules Prosper Castagnet
1925	1934	Joseph Garat
1934	1935	Jules Lafourcade
1935	1941	Pierre Simonet

Mayors from 1941

From	To	Name	Party	Position
1941	1944	Marcel Ribeton		
1944	1945	Jean Labourdique		
1945	1947	Jean Pierre Brana		
1947	1958	Maurice Delay		Surgeon
1958	1959	Georges Forsans		
1959	1995	Henri Grenet	UDF	Surgeon
1995	2014	Jean Grenet	UDI	MP, Chairman of the Adour-Basque Coast agglomeration 2008–2014
2014	2026	Jean René Etchegaray	UDI	President of the Adour-Basque Coast agglomeration

=== Cantons of Bayonne ===
As per the Decree of 22 December 1789, Bayonne was part of two cantons: Bayonne-North-east, which includes part of Bayonne commune plus Boucau, Saint-Pierre-d'Irube, Lahonce, Mouguerre, and Urcuit; and Bayonne Northwest which consisted of the rest of Bayonne commune plus Anglet, Arcangues, and Bassussarry.

In a first revision of cantons in 1973, three cantons were created from the same total; geographic area: Bayonne North, Bayonne East, and Bayonne West. A further reconfiguration, in 1982, focused primarily on Bayonne and, apart from Bayonne North Canton, which also includes Boucau, the cantons of Bayonne East and Bayonne West did not change.

Starting from the 2015 French departmental elections which took place on 22 and 29 March, a new division took effect following the decree of 25 February 2014 Once again three cantons centred on Bayonne are defined: Bayonne-1—with part of Anglet; Bayonne-2—which includes Boucau; and Bayonne-3 now define the cantonal territorial division of the area.

=== Judicial and administrative proceedings ===
Bayonne is the seat of many courts for the region. It falls under the jurisdiction of the Tribunal d'instance (District court) of Bayonne, the Tribunal de grande instance (High Court) of Bayonne, the Cour d'appel (Court of Appeal) of Pau, the Tribunal pour enfants (Juvenile court) of Bayonne, the Conseil de prud'hommes (Labour Court) of Bayonne, the Tribunal de commerce (Commercial Court) of Bayonne, the Tribunal administratif (Administrative tribunal) of Pau, and the Cour administrative d'appel (Administrative Court of Appeal) of Bordeaux.

The commune has a police station, a Departmental Gendarmerie, an Autonomous Territorial Brigade of the district Gendarmerie, squadron 24/2 of Mobile Gendarmerie and a Tax collection office.

=== Intercommunality ===
The commune is part of twelve inter-communal structures of which eleven are based in the commune:

- the Communauté d'agglomération du Pays Basque;
- the transport association of Côte basque-Adour Agglomeration (STACBA);
- the intercommunal association for the management of the Txakurrak centre;
- the intercommunal association for the support of Basque culture;
- the Bil Ta Garbi joint association;
- the joint association for maritime Nive;
- the joint association for the Basque Museum and the History of Bayonne;
- the joint association for the development and monitoring of SCOT in the agglomeration of Bayonne and south Landes;
- the Kosta Garbia joint association;
- the joint association for the development of the European freight centre of Bayonne-Mouguerre-Lahonce;
- the joint association for operating the regional Maurice Ravel Conservatory.
- the Energy association of Pyrénées-Atlantiques;

The city of Bayonne is part of the Communauté d'agglomération du Pays Basque which also includes Anglet, Biarritz, Bidart, Boucau, Hendaye and Saint-Jean-de-Luz. The statutory powers of the structure extend to economic development—including higher education and research—housing and urban planning, public transport—through Transdev—alternative and the collection and recovery waste collection and management of rain and coastal waters, the sustainable development, interregional cooperation and finally 106.

In addition, Bayonne is part of the Basque Bayonne-San Sebastián Eurocity which is a European economic interest grouping (EEIG) established in 1993 based in San Sebastián.

=== Twin towns – Sister cities ===
Bayonne has twinning associations with:

Veliko Tarnovo, Bulgaria since 2004; Satu Mare, Romania since 2008; Pamplona, Spain since 1970; Nyíregyháza, Hungary since 2008; (Spain) L'Hospitalet de Llobregat, since 2008; Kajaani, Finland since 2008	Hydra, Greece since 2008; Faro, Portugal since 2008; Daytona Beach, Florida, United States since 1970; Bayonne, New Jersey, United States since 1970; Ascoli Piceno, Italy since 2008

== Geography ==
Bayonne is located in the south-west of France on the western border between Basque Country and Gascony. It developed at the confluence of the Adour and tributary on the left bank, the Nive, 6 km from the Atlantic coast. The commune was part of the Basque province of Labourd.

=== Geology and relief ===
Bayonne occupies a territory characterized by a flat relief to the west and to the north towards the Landes forest, tending to slightly raise towards the south and east. The city has developed at the confluence of the Adour and Nive 6 kilometres (3.7 miles) from the ocean. The meeting point of the two rivers coincides with a narrowing of the Adour valley. Above this, the alluvial plain extends for nearly thirty kilometres (19 miles) towards both Tercis-les-Bains and Peyrehorade, and is characterized by swampy meadows called barthes. These are influenced by floods and high tides. (Note: In Gascony and in Basque country, alluvial floodplains along a river are called barthe (from the Gascon barta).) Downstream from this point, the river has shaped a large, wide bed in the sand dunes, creating a significant bottleneck at the confluence.

The occupation of the hill that dominates this narrowing of the valley developed through a gradual spread across the lowlands. Occupants built embankments and the aggradation from flood soil.

The Nive has played a leading role in the development of the Bayonne river system in recent geological time by the formation of alluvial terraces; these form the sub-soil of Bayonne beneath the surface accumulations of silt and aeolian sands. The drainage network of the western Pre-Pyrenees evolved mostly from the Quaternary, from south-east to northwest, oriented east–west. The Adour was captured by the gaves and this system, together with the Nive, led to the emergence of a new alignment of the lower Adour and the Adour-Nive confluence. This capture has been dated to the early Quaternary (80,000 years ago).

Before this capture, the Nive had deposited pebbles from the Mindel glaciation of medium to large sizes; this slowed erosion of the hills causing the bottleneck at Bayonne. After the deposit of the lowest alluvial terrace (10 to 15 metres (33–49 feet) high at Grand Bayonne), the course of the Adour became fixed in its lower reaches.

Subsequent to these deposits, there was a rise in sea level in the Holocene period (from 15,000 to 5000 years ago). This explains the invasion of the lower valleys with fine sand, peat, and mud with a thickness of more than 40 metres (130 feet) below the current bed of the Adour and the Nive in Bayonne. These same deposits are spread across the barthes.

In the late Quaternary, the current topographic physiognomy was formed—i.e. a set of hills overlooking a swampy lowland. The promontory of Bassussarry–Marracq ultimately extended to the Labourdin foothills. The Grand Bayonne hill is an example. Similarly, on the right bank of the Nive, the heights of Château-Neuf (Mocoron Hill) met the latest advance of the plateau of Saint-Pierre-d'Irube (height 30 to 35 metres (98–115 feet)). On the right bank of the Adour, the heights of Castelnau (today the citadel), with an altitude of 35 to 40 metres (115–131 feet), and Fort (today Saint-Esprit), with an altitude of 20 to 25 metres (66–82 feet), rise above the Barthes of the Adour, the Nive, Bourgneuf, Saint-Frédéric, Sainte-Croix, Aritxague, and Pontots.

The area of the commune is 2,168 hectares (5,360 acres) and its altitude varies between 0 to 55 metres (0–180 feet).

=== Hydrography ===
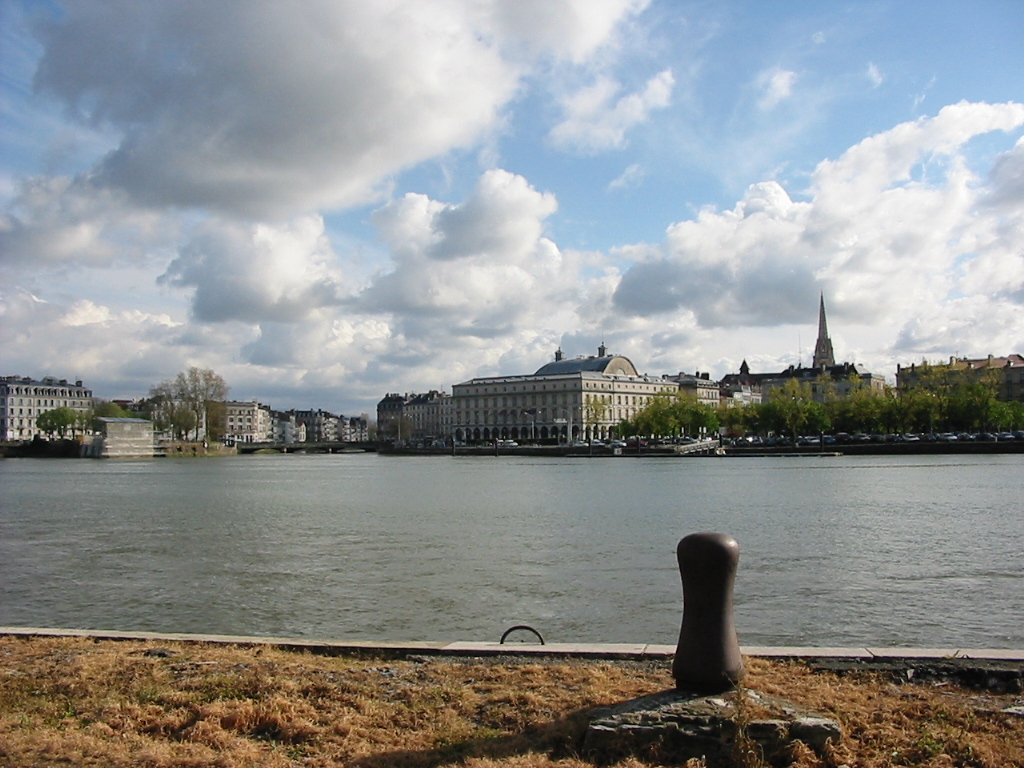
The confluence of the Adour and the Nive from the right bank of the Adour

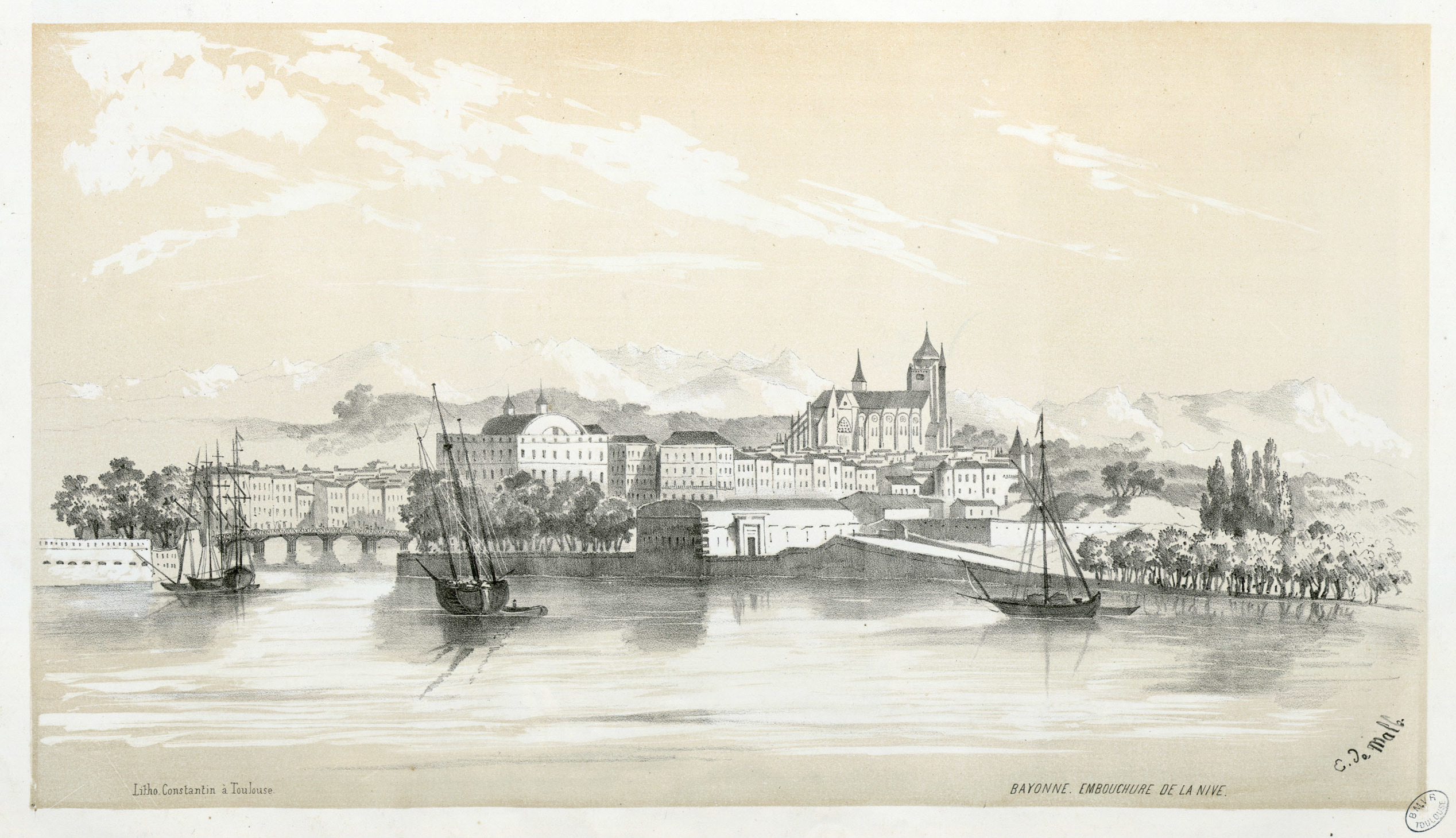
Confluence of the Nive in Bayonne in 1843, by Eugène de Malbos

The city developed along the river Adour. The river is part of the Natura 2000 network from its source at Bagnères-de-Bigorre to its exit to the Atlantic Ocean after Bayonne, between Tarnos (Landes) for the right bank and Anglet (Pyrénées-Atlantiques) for the left bank.

Apart from the Nive, which joins the left bank of the Adour after 79.3 kilometres (49.3 miles) of a sometimes tumultuous course, two tributaries join the Adour in Bayonne commune: the Ruisseau de Portou and the Ruisseau du Moulin Esbouc. Tributaries of the Nive are the Ruisseau de Hillans and the Ruisseau d'Urdaintz which both rise in the commune.

=== Climate ===
The nearest weather station is that of Biarritz-Anglet.

The climate of Bayonne is relatively similar to that of its neighbour Biarritz, described below, with fairly heavy rainfall; the oceanic climate is due to the proximity of the Atlantic Ocean. The average winter temperature is around 8 °C, and around 20 °C in summer. The lowest temperature recorded was −12.7 °C on 16 January 1985 and the highest 40.6 °C on 4 August 2003 in the 2003 European heat wave.} Rains on the Basque coast are rarely persistent except during winter storms. They often take the form of intense thunderstorms of short duration.

Comparison of local Meteorological data with other cities in France
Town	Sunshine (hours/yr)	Rain (mm/yr)	Snow (days/yr)	Storm (days/yr)	Fog (days/yr)
National average	1,973	770	14	22	40
Bayonne	1920	1450	2.2	35.5	28.5
Paris	1,661	637	12	18	10
Nice	2,724	767	1	29	1
Strasbourg	1,693	665	29	29	56
Brest	1,605	1,211	7	12	75

Climate data for Biarritz-Pays Basque (altitude 71 metres (233 feet), 1991-2020)
Month	Jan	Feb	Mar	Apr	May	Jun	Jul	Aug	Sep	Oct	Nov	Dec	Year
Record high °C (°F)	24.1 (75.4)	28.9 (84.0)	29.7 (85.5)	32.1 (89.8)	34.8 (94.6)	42.9 (109.2)	40.1 (104.2)	40.6 (105.1)	38.7 (101.7)	33.4 (92.1)	27.8 (82.0)	25.1 (77.2)	42.9 (109.2)
Mean daily maximum °C (°F)	12.2 (54.0)	12.8 (55.0)	15.2 (59.4)	16.8 (62.2)	19.9 (67.8)	22.5 (72.5)	24.2 (75.6)	25.1 (77.2)	23.3 (73.9)	20.2 (68.4)	15.4 (59.7)	12.9 (55.2)	18.4 (65.1)
Daily mean °C (°F)	8.6 (47.5)	8.9 (48.0)	11.2 (52.2)	12.8 (55.0)	15.9 (60.6)	18.7 (65.7)	20.6 (69.1)	21.2 (70.2)	18.9 (66.0)	16.1 (61.0)	11.6 (52.9)	9.3 (48.7)	14.5 (58.1)
Mean daily minimum °C (°F)	5.0 (41.0)	4.9 (40.8)	7.1 (44.8)	8.8 (47.8)	11.9 (53.4)	14.9 (58.8)	16.9 (62.4)	17.2 (63.0)	14.5 (58.1)	11.9 (53.4)	7.9 (46.2)	5.7 (42.3)	10.6 (51.1)
Record low °C (°F)	−12.7 (9.1)	−11.5 (11.3)	−7.2 (19.0)	−1.3 (29.7)	3.3 (37.9)	5.3 (41.5)	9.2 (48.6)	8.6 (47.5)	5.3 (41.5)	−0.6 (30.9)	−5.7 (21.7)	−8.9 (16.0)	−12.7 (9.1)
Average precipitation mm (inches)	139.6 (5.50)	110.4 (4.35)	102.8 (4.05)	117.7 (4.63)	116.1 (4.57)	99.2 (3.91)	77.3 (3.04)	87.5 (3.44)	118.2 (4.65)	147.3 (5.80)	206.9 (8.15)	150.6 (5.93)	1,473.6 (58.02)
Average precipitation days (≥ 1 mm)	13.7	12.0	11.9	13.3	12.5	10.1	9.4	9.2	10.2	12.1	13.8	12.9	141.1
Average snowy days	0.8	1.0	0.3	0.1	0.0	0.0	0.0	0.0	0.0	0.0	0.3	0.5	3.0
Average relative humidity (%)	77	75	73	77	78	81	80	81	80	78	79	78	78.1
Mean monthly sunshine hours	95.7	115.2	163.3	170.7	196.7	206.3	218.5	214.3	199.2	145.4	103.4	91.8	1,920.6
Source 1: Météo France
Source 2: Infoclimat.fr (humidity and snowy days, 1961–1990)

== Transport ==
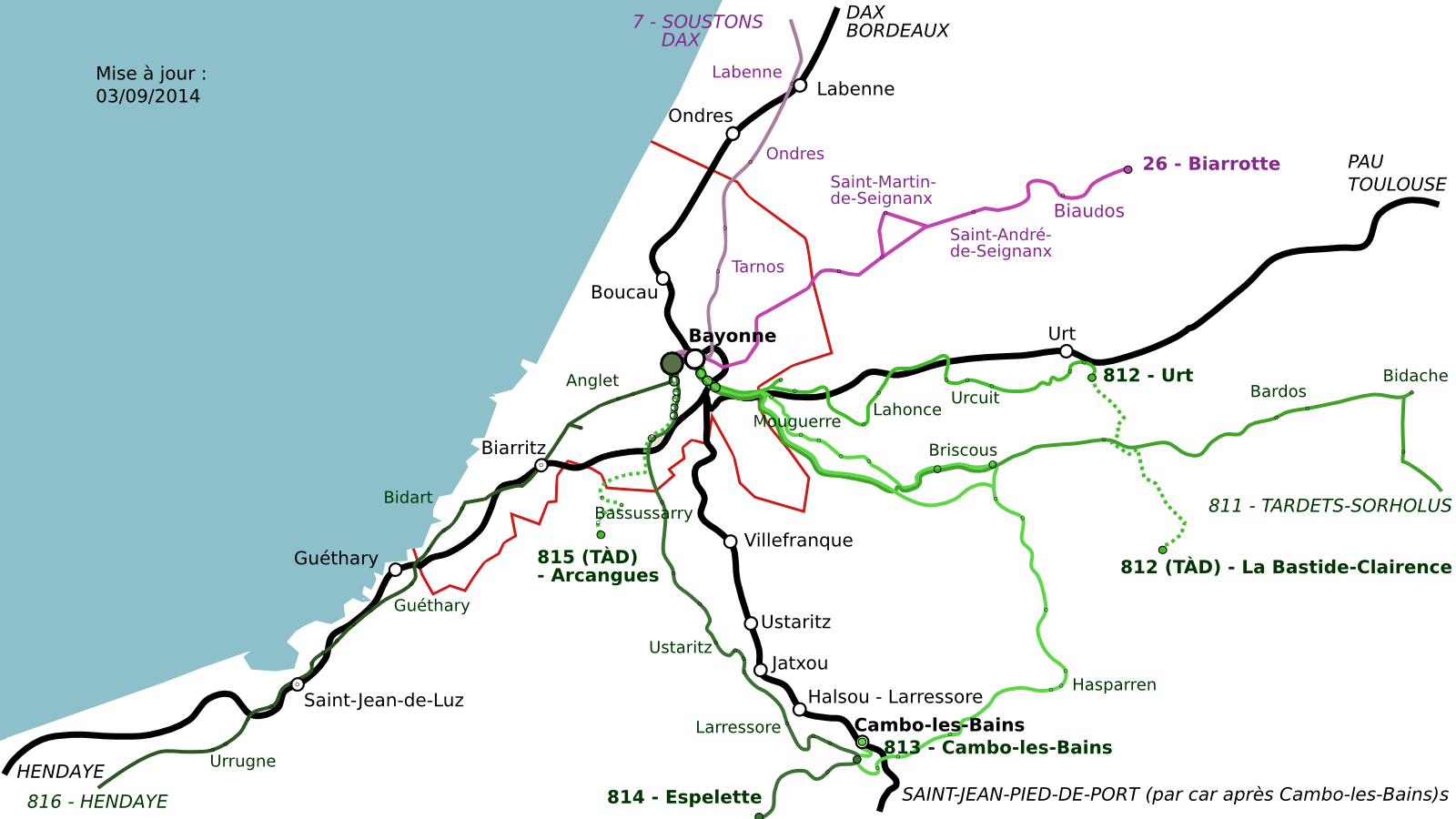
Public transport around Bayonne: railway lines are black, the intercity bus lines Pyrénées-Atlantiques are green and those of Landes purple. The PTU (perimeter of urban transport, which operates the Chronoplus network is uncharted here) is bounded by a red line.

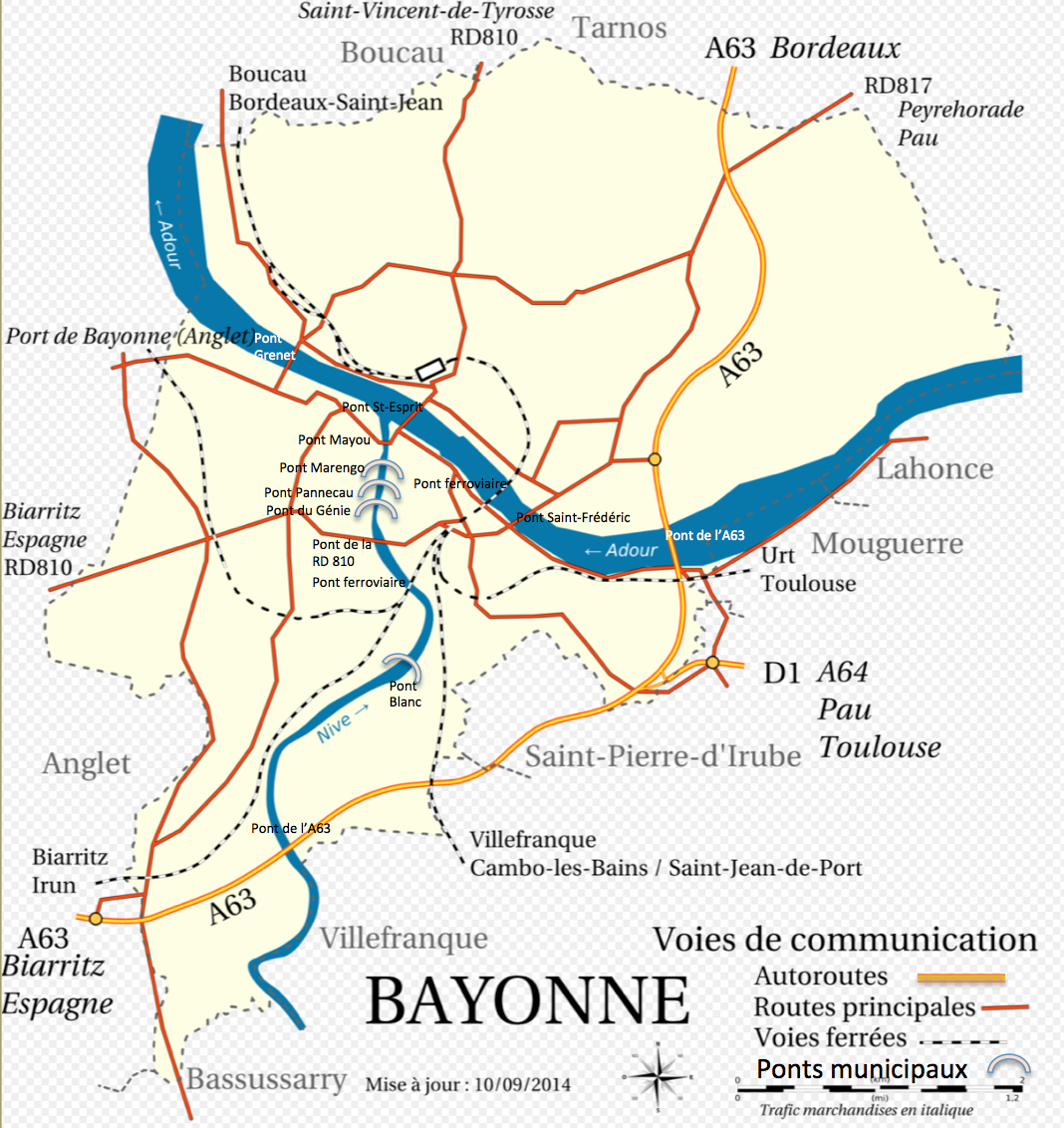
Means of transport (water, roads, bridges, and railways)

=== Road ===
Bayonne is located at the intersection of the A63 autoroute (Bordeaux-Spain) and the D1 extension of the A64 autoroute (towards Toulouse). The city is served by three interchanges—two of them on the A63: exit 6 (Bayonne Nord) serves the northern districts of Bayonne but also allows quick access to the centre while exit 5 (Bayonne Sud) provides access to the south and also serves Anglet. The third exit is the D1 / A64 via the Mousserolles interchange (exit 1 Bayonne Mousserolles) which links the district of the same name and also serves the neighbouring communes of Mouguerre and Saint-Pierre-d'Irube.

Bayonne was traversed by Route nationale 10 connecting Paris to Hendaye but this is now downgraded to a departmental road D810. Route nationale 117, linking Bayonne to Toulouse has been downgraded to departmental road D817.

=== Bridges ===
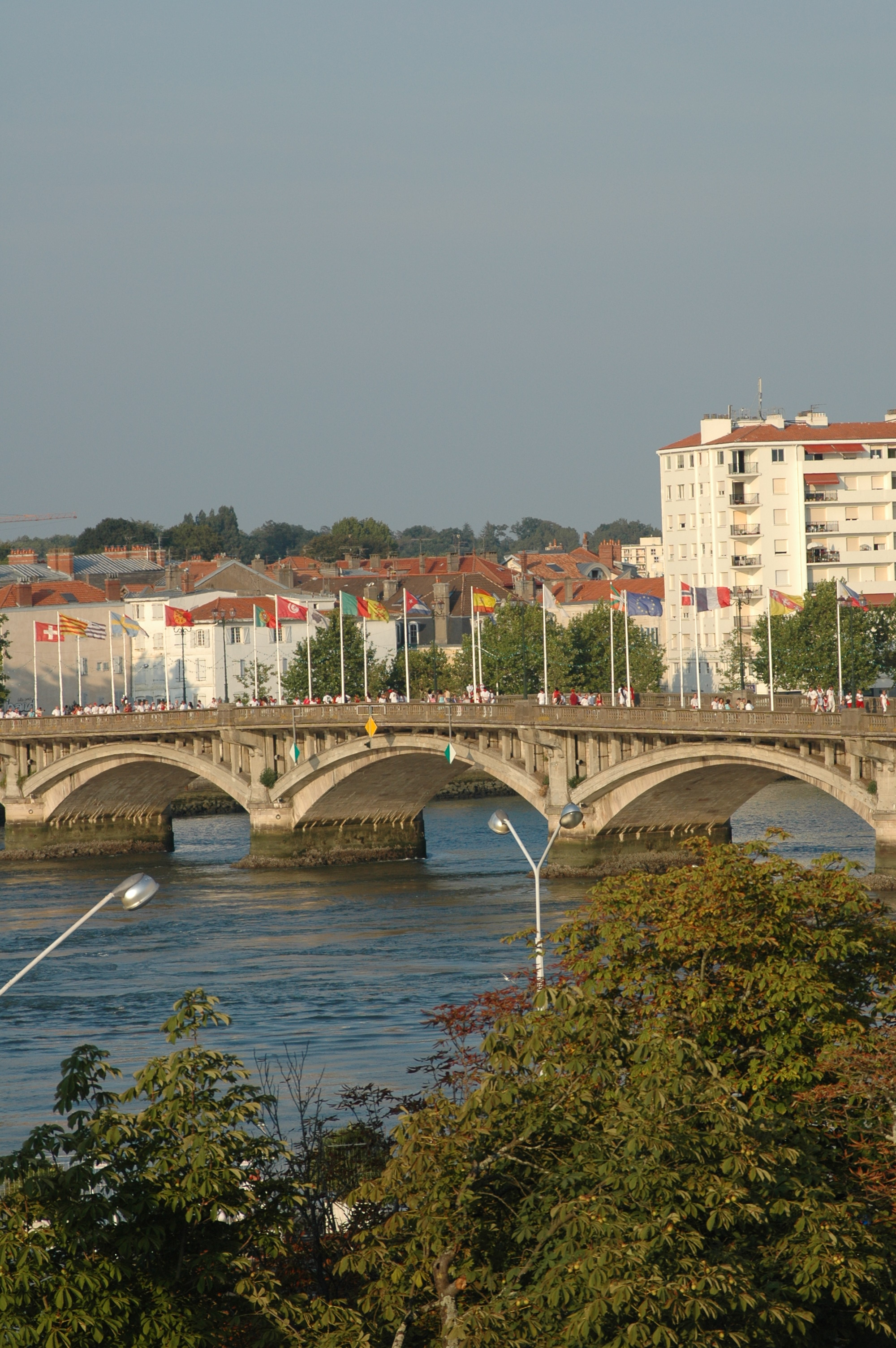
The Saint-Esprit bridge over the Adour

There are several bridges over both the Nive and the Adour, linking the various districts.

Coming from upstream on the Adour, there is the A63 bridge, then the Saint-Frédéric bridge which carries the D 810, then the railway bridge that replaced the old Eiffel iron bridge, the Saint-Esprit bridge, and finally the Grenet bridge. The Saint-Esprit bridge connects the Saint-Esprit district to the Amiral-Bergeret dock just upstream of the confluence with the river Nive. In 1845, the old bridge, originally made of wood, was rebuilt in masonry with seven arches supporting a deck 230 metres (750 feet) wide. (Note: p. 118.) It was then called the Nemours Bridge (not to be confused with the Grand pont de Nemours) in honour of Louis of Orleans, sixth Duke of Nemours, who laid the first stone. The bridge was finally called Saint-Esprit. Until 1868, the bridge had a moving span near the left bank. It was expanded in 1912 to facilitate the movement of horse-drawn carriages and motor vehicles.

On the Nive coming from upstream to downstream, there is the A63 bridge then the Pont Blanc (White bridge) (Note: The successor to the iron railway bridge Raccordement d'Aïtachouria, the Pont Blanc has been used since 2003 to link the Floride Sports Field to the wilderness area on the Ansot plain.) railway bridge, and then D810 bridge, the Génie bridge (or Pont Millitaire), the Pannecau bridge, the Marengo bridge (Note: The Marengo masonry bridge was under Napoleon III.) leading to the covered markets, and the Mayou Bridge. (Note: The Mayou bridge, formerly called Major or Maior, was rebuilt in stone in 1857.) The Pannecau bridge was long named Bertaco bridge and was rebuilt in masonry under Napoleon III. According to François Lafitte Houssat, "[...] a municipal ordinance of 1327 provided for the imprisonment of any quarrellsome woman of bad character in an iron cage dropped into the waters of the Nive River from the bridge. The practice lasted until 1780 [...]" This punishment bore the evocative name of cubainhade.

=== Cycling network ===
The commune is traversed by the Vélodyssée. Bicycle paths are located along the left bank of the Adour, a large part of the left bank of the Nive, and along various axes of the city where there are some bicycle lanes. The city offers free bicycles on loan.

=== Public transport ===
==== Urban network ====
Most of the lines of the Chronoplus bus network operated by the Transdev agglomeration of Bayonne link Bayonne to other communes in the urban transport perimeter: Anglet, Biarritz, Bidart, Boucau, Saint-Pierre-d'Irube and Tarnos (Note: The A1, A2, B, C, 4, 5, 6, 7, 8, 11, 14 and N lines (as at 9 September 2014)) The Bayonne free shuttle Bayonne serves the city centre (Grand and Petit Bayonne) by connecting several parking stations; other free shuttles perform other short trips within the commune.

==== Interurban networks ====
Bayonne is connected to many cities in the western half of the department such as Saint-Jean-de-Luz and Saint-Palais by the Pyrenees-Atlantiques long-distance coach network of Transport 64 managed by the General Council. Since the network restructuring in the summer of 2013, the lines converge on Bayonne. Bayonne is also served by services from the Landes departmental network, XL'R.

==== Rail transport ====
The Gare de Bayonne is located in the Saint-Esprit district and is an important station on the Bordeaux-Irun railway. It is also the terminus of lines leading from Toulouse to Bayonne and from Bayonne to Saint-Jean-Pied-de-Port. It is served by TGV, Intercités, Intercités de nuit, and TER Nouvelle-Aquitaine trains (to Hendaye, Saint-Jean-Pied-de-Port, Dax, Bordeaux, Pau, and Tarbes).

==== Air transport ====
Bayonne is served by the Biarritz – Anglet – Bayonne Airport (IATA code: BIQ • ICAO code: LFBZ), located on the communal territories of Anglet and Biarritz. (Note: Only a quarter of the area, the west end of the runway, is located in Biarritz commune.) The airport was returned to service in 1954 after repair of damage from bombing during the Second World War.

== Demographics ==
Historical population

Year	Pop.	±% p.a.
1793	12,578	—
1800	13,190	+0.68%
1806	14,006	+1.01%
1821	13,248	−0.37%
1831	14,773	+1.10%
1836	15,912	+1.50%
1841	17,303	+1.69%
1846	18,120	+0.93%
1851	18,870	+0.81%
1856	26,187	+6.77%
1861	25,611	−0.44%
1866	26,333	+0.56%
1872	27,173	+0.52%
1876	27,416	+0.22%
1881	26,261	−0.86%
1886	27,289	+0.77%
1891	27,192	−0.07%
1896	26,918	−0.20%
1901	27,601	+0.50%

Year	Pop.	±% p.a.
1906	26,488	−0.82%
1911	27,886	+1.03%
1921	28,215	+0.12%
1926	31,436	+2.19%
1931	31,727	+0.18%
1936	31,350	−0.24%
1946	32,620	+0.40%
1954	32,575	−0.02%
1962	36,941	+1.58%
1968	42,743	+2.46%
1975	42,938	+0.07%
1982	41,381	−0.53%
1990	40,051	−0.41%
1999	40,078	+0.01%
2007	44,498	+1.32%
2012	45,855	+0.60%
2017	51,228	+2.24%
2023	54,306	+0.98%

Source: EHESS and INSEE

== Education ==
Bayonne commune is attached to the Academy of Bordeaux. It has an information and guidance center (CIO).

As of 14 December 2015, Bayonne had 10 kindergartens, 22 elementary or primary schools (12 public and 10 private primary schools including two ikastolas). 2 public colleges (Albert Camus and Marracq colleges), 5 private colleges (La Salle Saint-Bernard, Saint Joseph, Saint-Amand, Notre-Dame and Largenté) which meet the criteria of the first cycle of second degree studies. For the second cycle, Bayonne has 3 public high schools (René-Cassin school (general education), the Louis de Foix school (general, technological and vocational education), and the Paul Bert vocational school), 4 private high schools (Saint-Louis Villa Pia (general education), Largenté, Bernat Etxepare (general and technological), and Le Guichot vocational school).

There are also the Maurice Ravel Conservatory of Music, Dance, and Dramatic Art and the art school of the urban community of Bayonne-Anglet-Biarritz.

== Culture ==
=== Cultural festivities and events ===
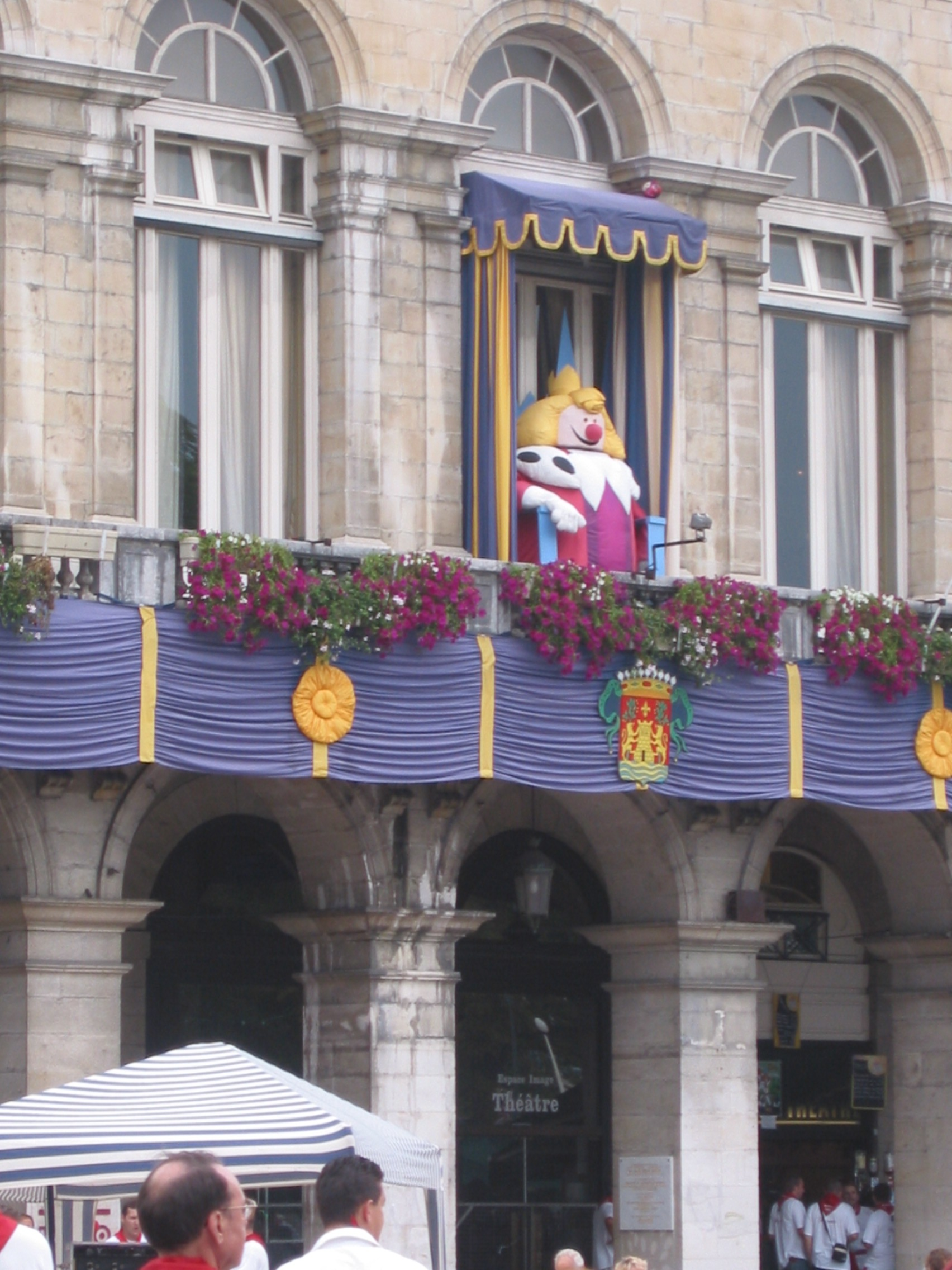
Fêtes de Bayonne 2004, King Léon

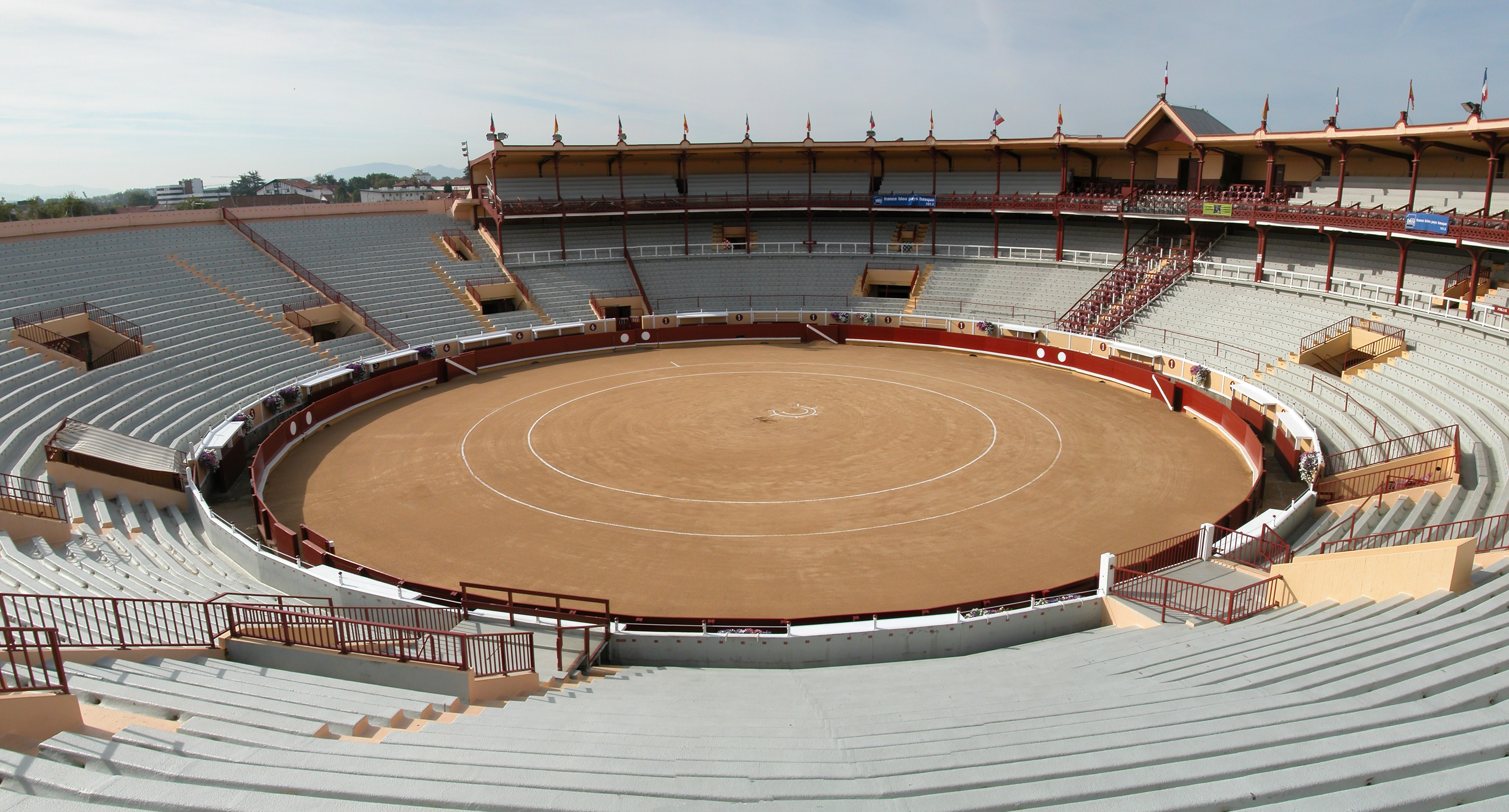
The Bayonne bullfighting ring

For 550 years, every holy Thursday, Friday and Saturday the Foire au Jambon (Ham festival) is held to mark the beginning of the season. (Note: In 2014, the Ham Festival was held from 17 to 20 April)

An annual summer festival has been held in the commune since 1932 for five days, (Note: Bayonne Celebrations traditionally begin on the Wednesday preceding the first weekend of August but the schedule has been changed and the start of celebrations has been advanced in recent years because the crowds become too large. They end the following Sunday.) organized around parades, bulls races, fireworks, and music in the Basque and Gascon tradition. These festivals have become the most important festive events in France in terms of attendance.

Bayonne has the oldest French bullfighting tradition. A bylaw regulating the encierro is dated 1283: cows, oxen and bulls are released each year in the streets of Petit Bayonne during the summer festivals. The current arena, opened in 1893, is the largest in South-west France with more than 10,000 seats. A dozen bullfights are held each year, attracting the biggest names in bullfighting. Throughout summer several novilladas also take place. The city is a member of the Union of French bullfighting cities.

== Health ==
Bayonne is the focus of much of the hospital services for the agglomeration of Bayonne and the southern Landes. In this area, all inhabitants are less than 35 km from a hospital offering medical, obstetrical, surgical, or psychiatric care. The hospitals for all the Basque Coast are mainly established in Bayonne (the main site of Saint-Léon and Cam-de-Prats) and also in Saint-Jean-de-Luz which has several clinics.

== Sports ==
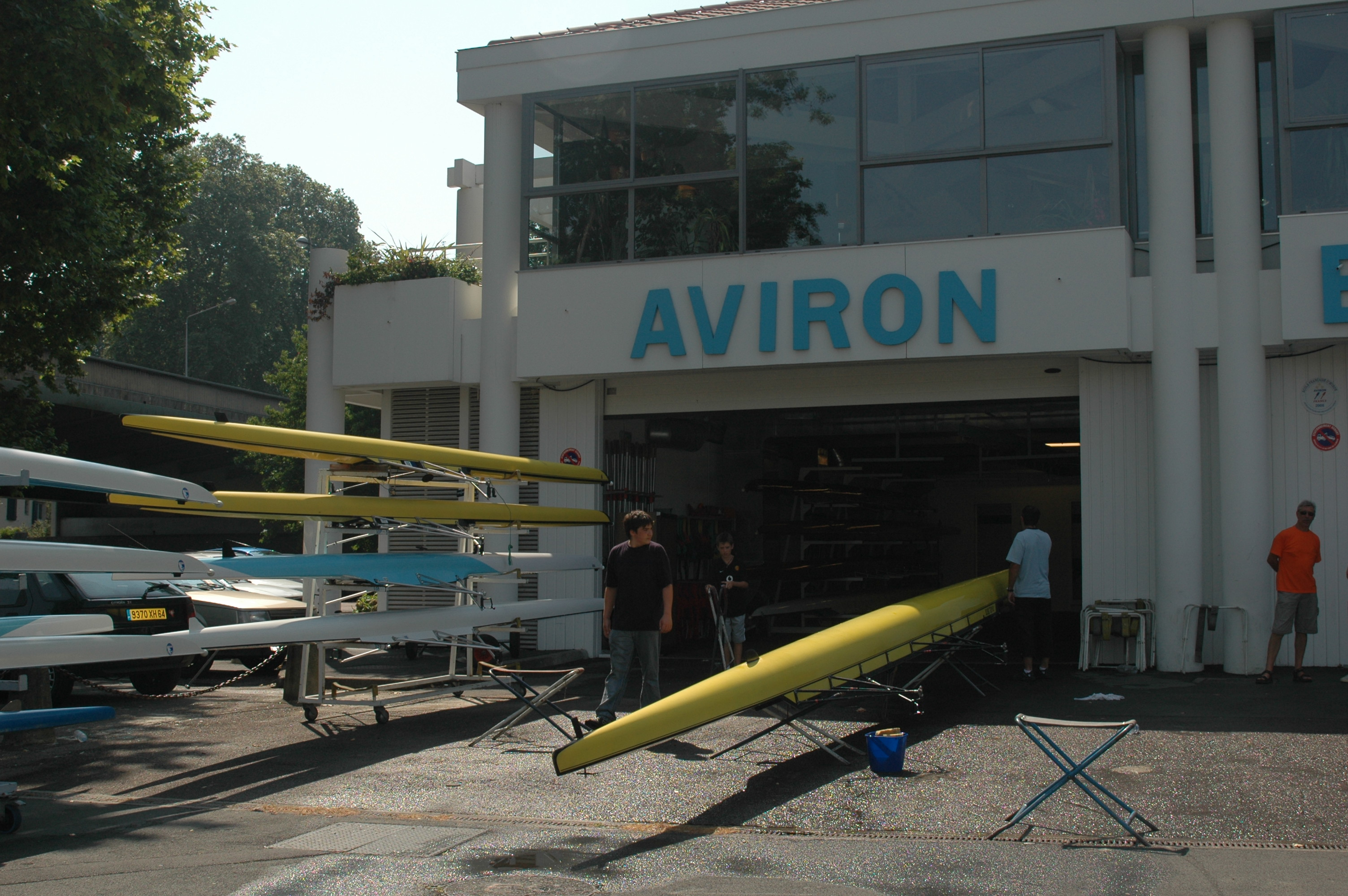
Bayonne rowing boat shed

- Rowing, a popular sport for a long time on the Nive and the Adour near Bayonne. There are two clubs: the Nautical Society of Bayonne (SNB) (established in 1875) and Aviron Bayonnais—established in 1904 by former members of the SNB and which later became a sports club.
- Basketball. Denek Bat Bayonne Urcuit is a basketball club with a male section competing in NM1 (3rd national level of the French league). The club is based in the city of Urcuit but plays in the Lauga Sports Palace in Bayonne.
- Football. Aviron Bayonnais FC play their home games at Didier Deschamps Stadium in Championnat National 2 (the 5th French division) since the 2013–2014 season after a year in CFA and three consecutive years in the Championnat National. Didier Deschamps started his career at Aviron Bayonnais FC. The stadium, formerly called the Grand Basque, is now named after him. There are also three other football clubs in Bayonne: the Crusaders of Saint Andrew playing in the higher regional division, the Portuguese stars of Bayonne (first district division), and the Bayonne association on the right bank of the river (3rd district division).
- Omnisports. Aviron Bayonnais, created in 1904, includes many sports sections and a large number of members. (Note: There are 20 sports sections including the Aviron Bayonnais pro rugby and Aviron Bayonnais FC according to the Aviron Bayonnais FC website (accessed 29 July 2014).) The pro rugby and football club are the most famous sections of the club. The Bayonne Olympic Club, created in 1972, is located in the district of Hauts de Sainte-Croix. The club offers a wide range of sports including pelote, gymnastics, combat sports, and a pool section. The club had nearly 400 members in 2007.
- Basque Pelota Bayonne is an important place for Basque pelota. The French Federation of Basque Pelota is headquartered at Trinquet moderne near the Bullring. Many titles were won by pelota players from the city. The World Championships took place in Bayonne in 1978 in association with Biarritz.
- Rugby appeared in Basque Country at the end of the 19th century with the arrival, in 1897 at Bayonne High School, of a 20-year-old person from Landes who converts his comrades to football-rugby which he had discovered in Bordeaux. Practicing in the fields near the Spanish Gate, they communicated their enthusiasm to other colleges in Bayonne and Biarritz leading to the creation of the Biarritz Sporting Club and Biarritz Stadium which merged in 1913 to become Biarritz Olympique. Bayonne has two rugby clubs: The Bayonne Athletic Association (ASB) plays in Fédérale 3 while the Aviron Bayonnais rugby pro in the 2014–2015 season played in Top 14, where they have played without interruption since the 2004–2005 season. Aviron Bayonnais has won three league titles in France (1913, 1934 and 1943). It was the first club from a small town to become champion of France. Its stadium is the Stade Jean Dauger. There is also a women's team in the ASB, playing in the National Division 1B. This team won the 2014 Armelle Auclair challenge.

== Religion ==
=== Christian worship ===
Bayonne is in the Diocese of Bayonne, Lescar and Oloron, with a suffragan bishop since 2002 under the Archdiocese of Bordeaux. Monseigneur Marc Aillet has been the bishop of this diocese since 15 October 2008. The diocese is located in Bayonne in the Place Monseigneur-Vansteenberghe.

Besides Bayonne Cathedral in Grand Bayonne, Bayonne has Saint-Esprit, Saint Andrew (Rue des Lisses), Arènes (Avenue of the Czech Legion), Saint-Étienne, and Saint-Amand (Avenue Marechal Soult) churches.

The Carmel of Bayonne, located in the Marracq district, has had a community of Carmelite nuns since 1858.

The Way of Baztan (also ruta del Baztan or camino Baztanés) is a way on the pilgrimage of Camino de Santiago which crosses the Pyrenees further west by the lowest pass (by the Col de Belate, 847 m). It is the ancient road used by pilgrims descending to Bayonne then either along the coast on the Way of Soulac or because they landed there from England, for example, to join the French Way as soon as possible in Pamplona. The Way of Bayonne joins the French Way further downstream at Burgos.

The Protestant church is located at the corner of Rue Albert-I st and Rue du Temple. A gospel church is located in the Saint-Esprit district where there is also a church belonging to the Gypsy Evangelical Church of the Protestant Federation of France.

=== Jewish worship ===
The synagogue was built in 1837 in the Saint-Esprit district north of the town. The Jewish community of Bayonne is old—it consists of different groups of fugitives from Navarre and Portugal who established at Saint-Esprit-lès-Bayonne after the expulsion of Jews from Spain in 1492 and Portugal in 1496. In 1846, the Central Consistory moved to Saint-Esprit which was integrated with Bayonne in 1857.

The Jewish Cemetery of Bayonne was established in 1689 in the Saint-Étienne neighborhood in the northern quarter of the city. It was remodeled and enlarged in the 18th and 19th century and covers and area of two hectares.

== Economy ==
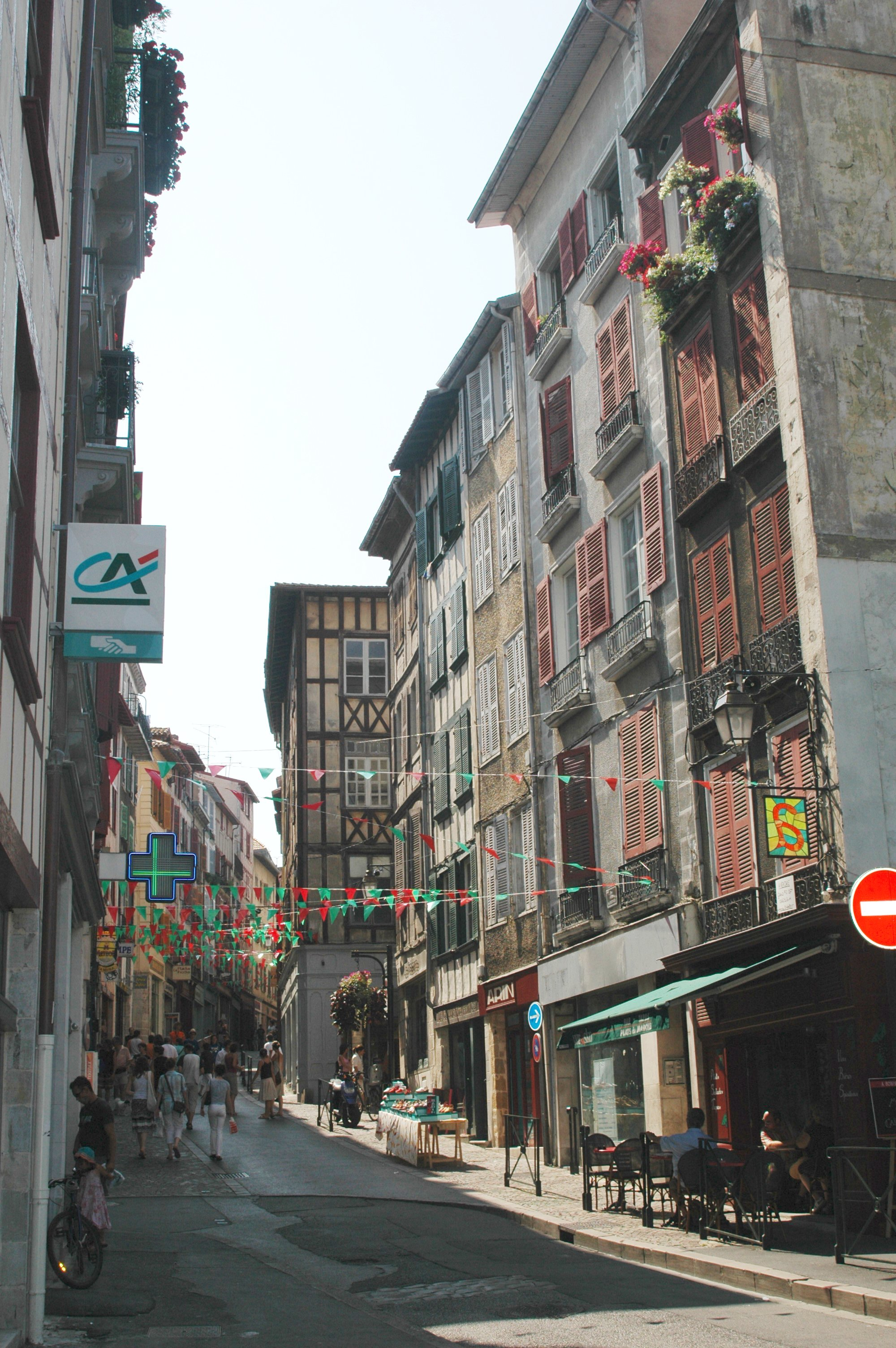
Rue Poissonnerie, a shopping street in Grand-Bayonne

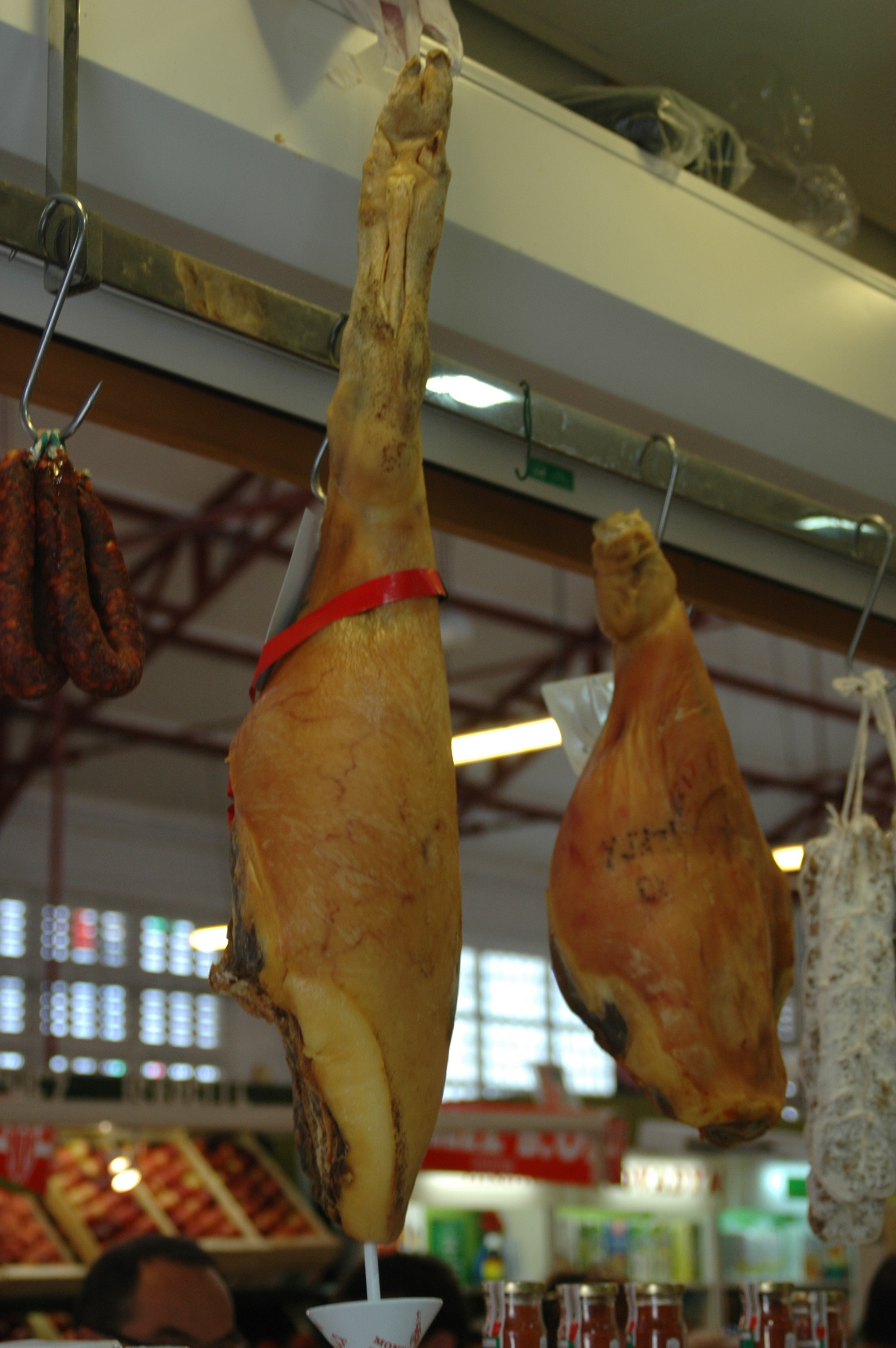
Bayonne ham

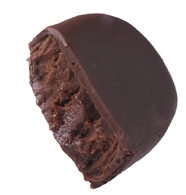
Dark chocolate with Espelette pepper

=== Population and income tax ===
In 2011, the median household income tax was €22,605, placing Bayonne 28,406th place among the 31,886 communes with more than 49 households in metropolitan France.

In 2011, 47.8% of households were not taxable. (Note: REV T1 – Taxes on the income of households.)

=== Employment ===
In 2011, the population aged from 15 to 64 years was 29,007 persons of which 70.8% were employable, 60.3% in employment and 10.5% unemployed. (Note: EMP T1 – Population from 15 to 64 years by type of activity.) While there were 30,012 jobs in the employment area, against 29,220 in 2006, and the number of employed workers residing in the employment area was 17,667, the indicator of job concentration is 169.9% which means that the employment area offers nearly two jobs for every available worker. (Note: EMP T5 – Employment and Activity.)

=== Businesses and shops ===
Bayonne is the economic capital of the agglomeration of Bayonne and southern Landes. The table below details the number of companies located in Bayonne according to their industry: (Note: DEN T5 – Number of establishments by sector of activity on 1 January 2013.)

Structure of the economy in Bayonne as at 1 January 2013
	No. of establishments
Total	4,665
Industry	270
Construction	375
Trade, transport and services	3,146
Public administration, education, health, and social services	874
Scope: Commercial activities excluding agriculture

The table below shows employees by business establishments in terms of numbers: (Note: CEN T1 – Active establishments by sector of activity on 31 December 2011.)

Active establishments by sector of activity on 31 December 2011
	Total	%	0 staff	1 to 9 staff	10 to 19 staff	20 to 49 staff	50 staff or more
Ensemble	5,946	100.0	3,797	1,708	213	155	73
Agriculture, sylviculture and fishing	46	0.8	38	6	0	2	0
Industry	292	4.9	150	101	23	15	3
Construction	428	7.2	299	84	26	15	4
Trade, transport, services	3,953	66.5	2,390	1,346	117	73	27
including trade and car repair	1,115	18,8	579	457	38	32	>9
Public administration, education, health, social services	1,227	20.6	920	171	47	50	39
Scope: All activities

The following comments apply to the two previous tables: (Note: These remarks are not the result of a statistical study of the data presented; they are only indicative.)

- the bulk of economic activity is provided by companies in the tertiary sector;
- Agriculture is almost non-existent Note 54; (Note: Part of the commune is part of the town is in the appellation d'origine controlee (AOC) zone of Ossau-Iraty but there were no producers in 2014.)
- less than 5% of the activity is from the industrial sector which remains focused on establishments of less than 50 employees, as also are construction-related activities;
- public administration, education, health and social services are activities of over 20% of establishments, confirming the importance of Bayonne as an administrative centre.

In 2013, 549 new establishments were created in Bayonne including 406 sole proprietorships. (Note: DEN T1 – Creation of Enterprises by sector of activity in 2011.) (Note: DEN T2 – Creation of individual entreprises by sector of activity in 2011.)

=== Workshops and Industry ===
Bayonne has few of such industries, as indicated in the previous tables. There is Plastitube specializing in plastic packaging (190 employees). The Izarra liqueur company set up a distillery in 1912 at Quai Amiral-Bergeret and has long symbolized the economic wealth of Bayonne. Industrial activities are concentrated in the neighbouring communes of Boucau, Tarnos (Turbomeca), Mouguerre, and Anglet.

Bayonne is known for its fine chocolates, produced in the town for 500 years, and Bayonne ham, a cured ham seasoned with peppers from nearby Espelette. Izarra, the liqueur made in bright green or yellow colours, is distilled locally. It is said by some that Bayonne is the birthplace of mayonnaise, supposedly a corruption of Bayonnaise, the French adjective describing the city's people and produce. Now bayonnaise can refer to a particular mayonnaise flavoured with the Espelette chillis.

Bayonne is now the centre of certain craft industries that were once widespread, including the manufacture of makilas, traditional Basque walking-sticks. The Fabrique Alza just outside the city is known for its palas, bats used in pelota, the traditional Basque sport.

=== Service activities ===
The active tertiary sector includes some large retail chains such as those detailed by geographer Roger Brunet: BUT (240 staff), Carrefour (150 staff), E.Leclerc (150 staff), Leroy Merlin (130 staff), and Galeries Lafayette (120 employees). Banks, cleaning companies (Onet, 170 employees), and security (Brink's, 100 employees) are also major employers in the commune, as is urban transport which employs nearly 200 staff. Five health clinics, providing a total of more than 500 beds, each employ 120 to 170 staff.

=== The port of Bayonne ===
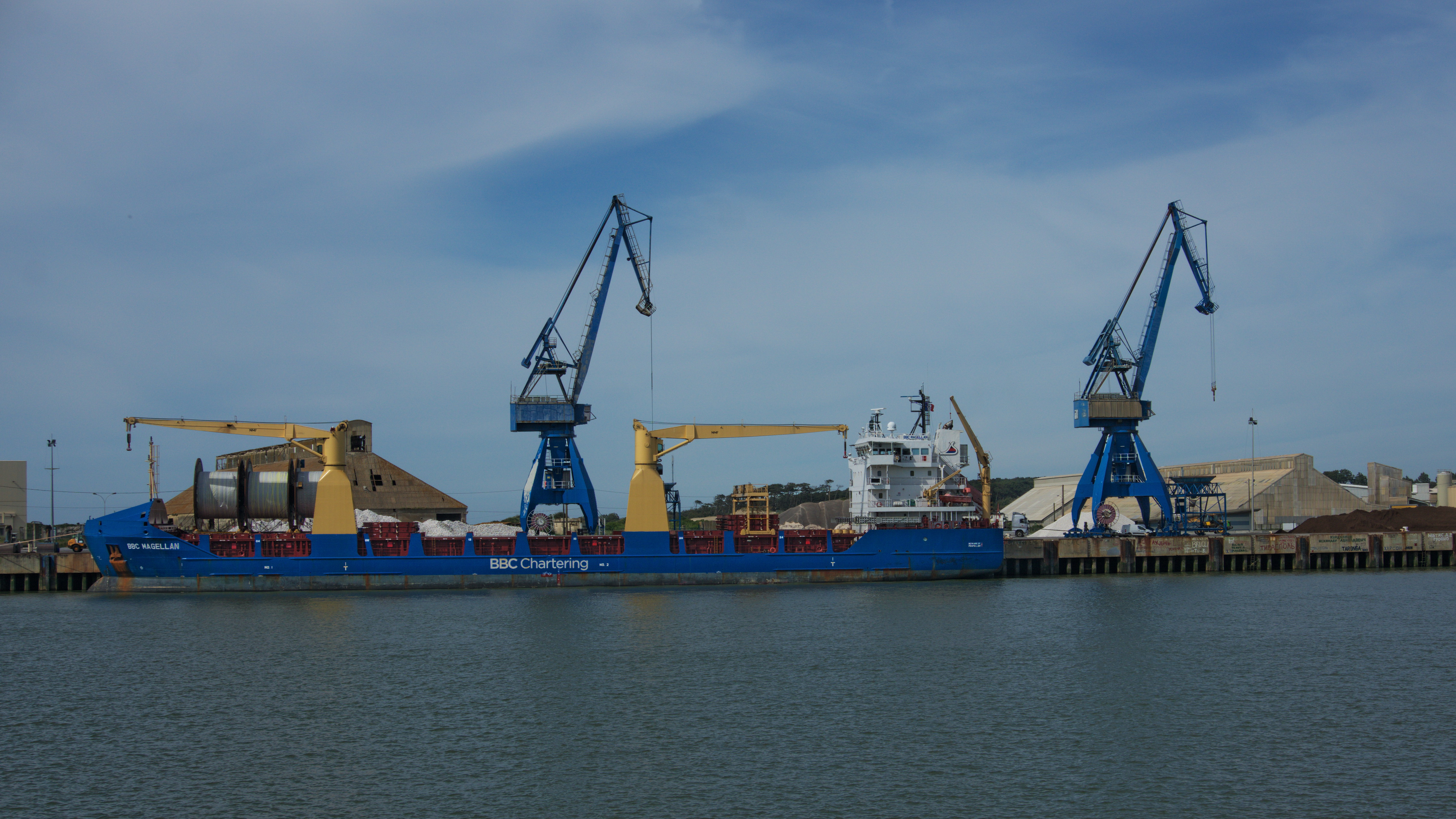
The cargo ship BBC-Magellan in the port of Bayonne in 2014

The port of Bayonne is located at the mouth of the Adour, downstream of the city. It also occupies part of communes of Anglet and Boucau in Pyrenees-Atlantiques and Tarnos in Landes. It benefits greatly from the natural gas field of Lacq to which it is connected by pipeline. This is the ninth largest French port for trade with an annual traffic of about 4.2 million tonnes of which 2.8 is export. It is also the largest French port for export of maize. It is the property of the Aquitaine region who manage and control the site. Metallurgical products movement are more than one million tons per year and maize exports to Spain vary between 800,000 and 1 million tons. The port also receives refined oil products from the TotalEnergies oil refinery at Donges (800,000 tons per year). Fertilizers are a traffic of 500,000 tons per year and sulphur from Lacq, albeit in sharp decline, is 400,000 tons.

The port also receives Ford and General Motors vehicles from Spain and Portugal and wood both tropical and from Landes.

=== Tourism services ===
Due to its proximity to the ocean and the foothills of the Pyrenees as well as its historic heritage, Bayonne has developed important activities related to tourism. (Note: EMP T8 – Employment by sector of activity (in French).)

On 31 December 2012, there were 15 hotels in the city offering more than 800 rooms to visitors, but there were no camp sites. (Note: TOU T1 – Number and capacity of hotels at 31 December 2012 (in French).) The tourist infrastructure in the surrounding urban area of Bayonne complements the local supply with around 5800 rooms spread over nearly 200 hotels and 86 campsites offering over 14,000 beds. The Information site of the Bayonne Tourist Office, VisitBayonne.com is featured on the Global Visit List

== Sights ==
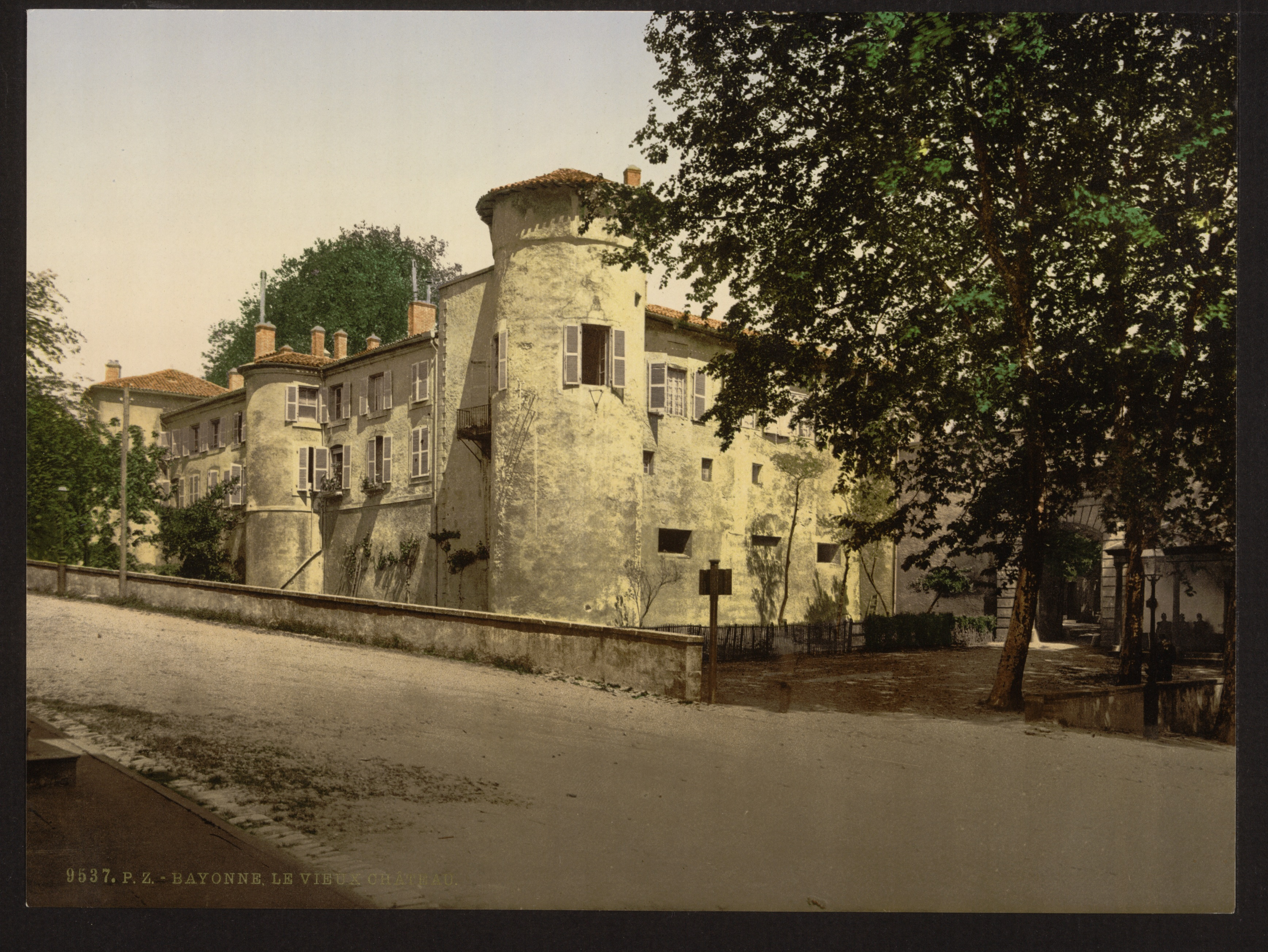
The Château Vieux

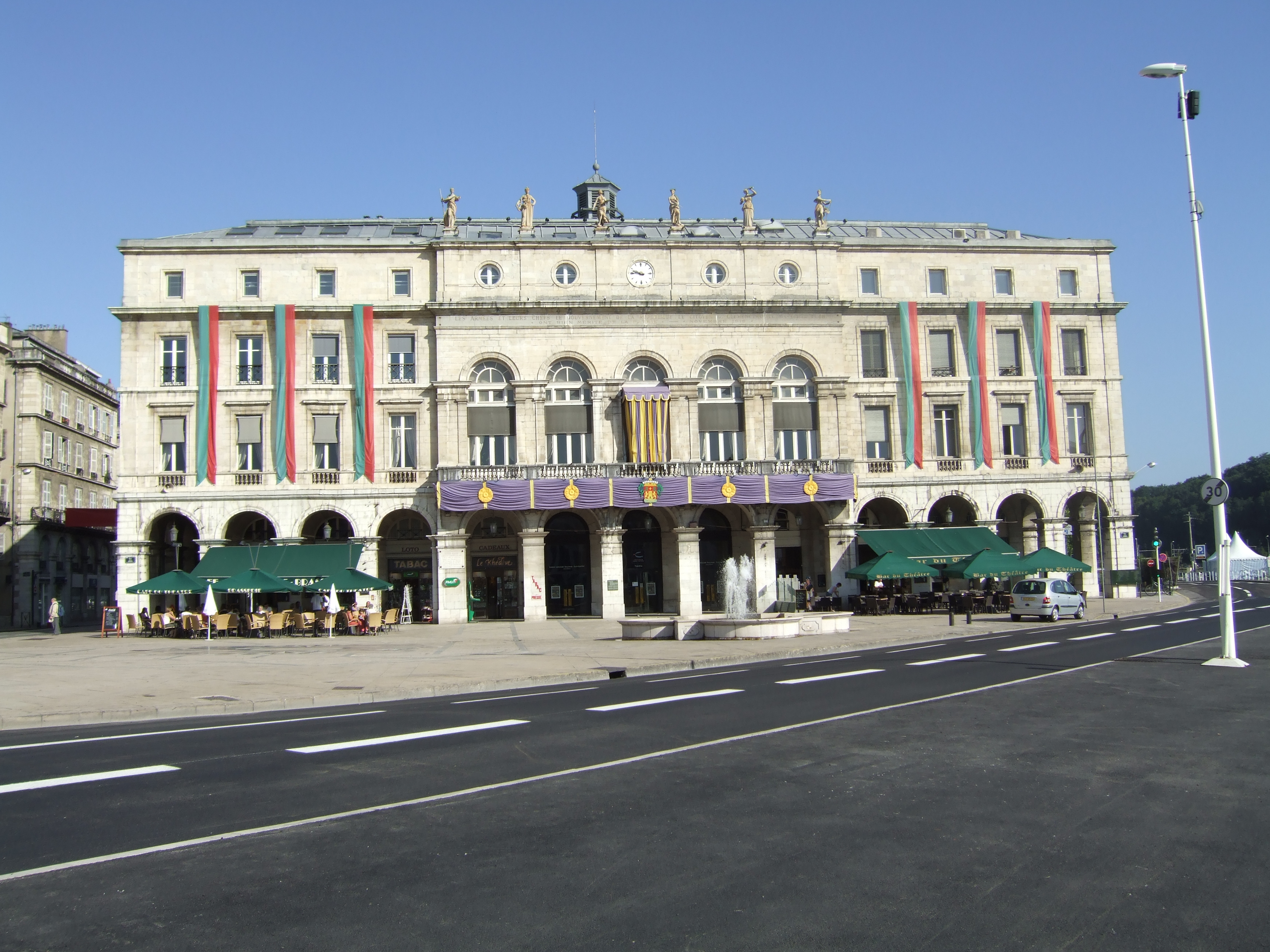
The Hôtel de Ville and Michel Portal Theatre

The Nive divides Bayonne into Grand Bayonne and Petit Bayonne with five bridges between the two, both quarters still being backed by Vauban's walls. The houses lining the Nive are examples of Basque architecture, with half-timbering and shutters in the national colours of red and green. The much wider Adour is to the north. The Pont Saint-Esprit connects Petit Bayonne with the Quartier Saint-Esprit across the Adour, where the massive Citadelle and the railway station are located. Grand Bayonne is the commercial and civic hub, with small pedestrianised streets packed with shops, plus the cathedral and the Hôtel de Ville.

The Cathédrale Sainte-Marie is a Gothic-style building constructed between the 13th and 15th centuries. The tower spires were not added until the 19th century, during a substantial restoration project. The cathedral houses the shrine of Saint-Léon de Carentan, 9th-century Bishop of Bayonne, and is a recognized UNESCO World Heritage Site.

Nearby is the Château Vieux, some of which dates back to the 12th century, where the governors of the city were based, including the English Black Prince.

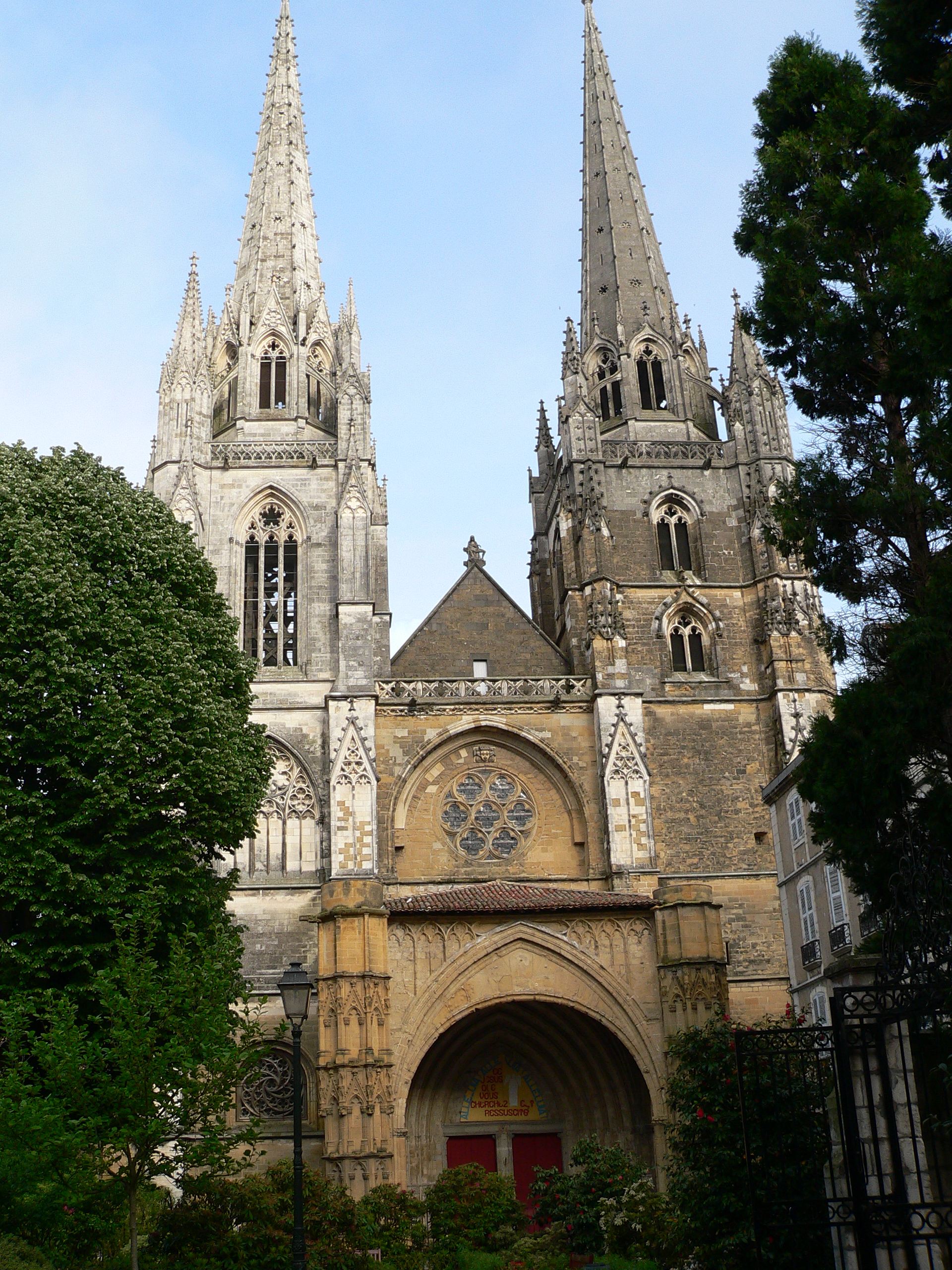
Sainte-Marie Cathedral

The Musée Basque is an ethnographic museum of the entire Basque Country. Opened in February 1924, the museum has special exhibitions on Basque agriculture and history, seafaring, pelota, and handicrafts.

The Musée Bonnat began with a large collection bequeathed by the local-born painter Léon Bonnat. The museum is one of the best galleries in south west France and has paintings by Edgar Degas, El Greco, Sandro Botticelli, and Francisco Goya, among others.

At the back of Petit Bayonne is the Château Neuf, among the ramparts. Now an exhibition space, it was started by the newly arrived French in 1460 to control the city. The walls nearby have been opened to visitors. They are important for plant life now and Bayonne's botanic gardens adjoin the walls on both sides of the Nive.

The area across the Adour is largely residential and industrial, with much demolished to make way for the railway. The Saint-Esprit church was part of a bigger complex built by Louis XI to care for pilgrims to Santiago de Compostela. It is home to a wooden Flight into Egypt sculpture.

Overlooking the quarter is Vauban's 1680 Citadelle. The soldiers of Wellington's army who died besieging the citadelle in 1813 are buried in the nearby English Cemetery, visited by Queen Victoria and other British dignitaries when staying in Biarritz.

The distillery of the famous local liqueur Izarra is located on the northern bank of the Adour and is open to visitors.

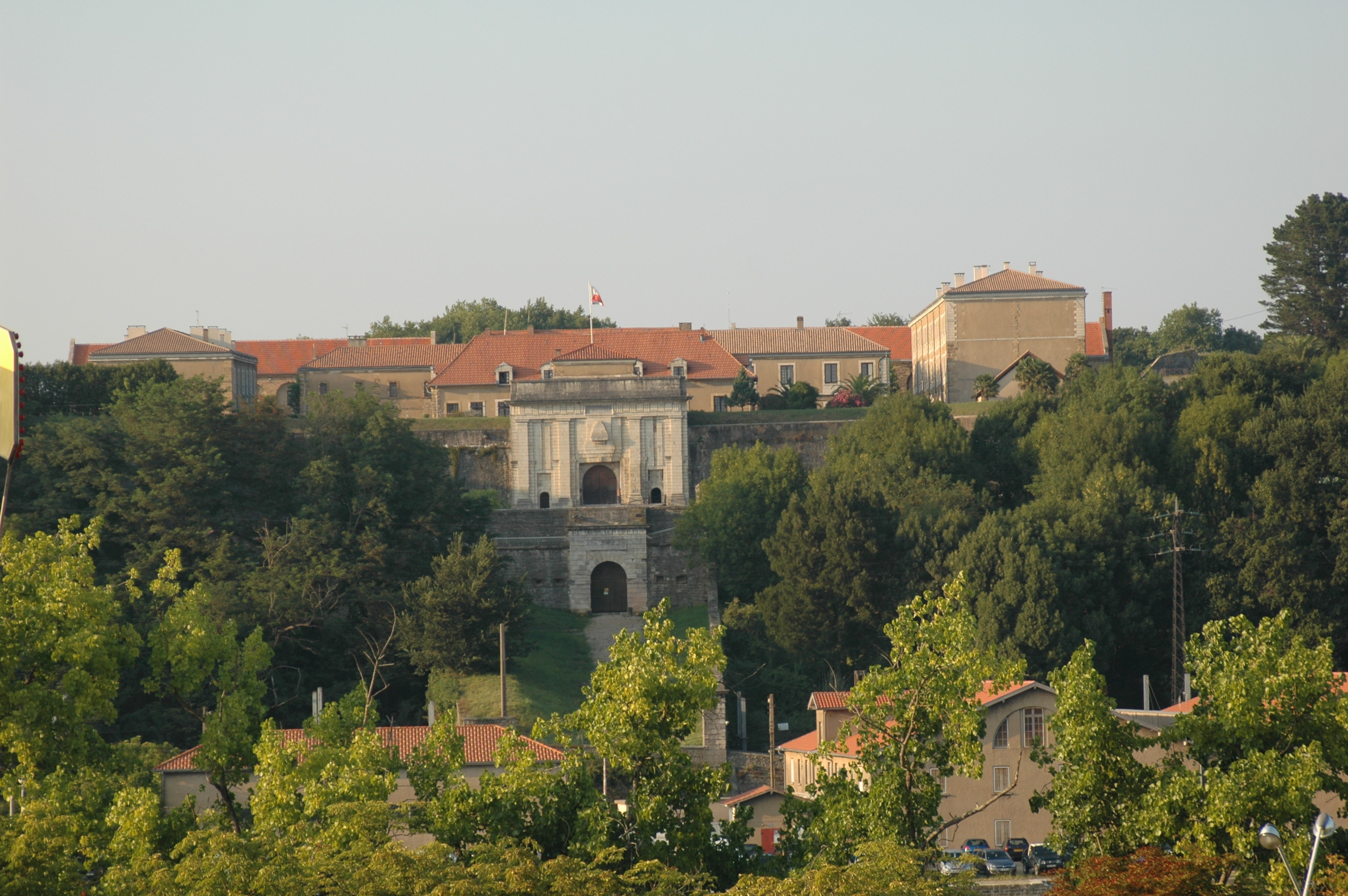
Citadel

== Notable people ==
=== 1200s ===
- Edmund Crouchback or Edmond Plantagenet, Earl of Lancaster, born in 1245 at London and died in 1296 at Bayonne, was an English prince. Second surviving son of King Henry III and Eleanor of Provence, he was the 1st Earl of Lancaster and the founder of the House of Lancaster

=== 1500s ===
- Jean du Vergier de Hauranne, (1581–1643), theologian, who introduced Jansenism into France

=== 1700s ===
- Guillaume du Tillot (1711–1774), politician
- Marguerite Brunet, called Mademoiselle Montansier, born in 1730 at Bayonne and died in 1820 at Paris, was an actress and director of theatre. The house where she was born still exists in Rue des Faures, at Bayonne.
- Dominique Joseph Garat (1749–1833), writer and politician
- François Cabarrus (1752–1810), French adventurer and Spanish financier
- Armand Joseph Dubernad (1741–1799), financial trader, consul general of the Holy Roman Empire
- Bertrand Pelletier (1761–1797), chemist and pharmacologist
- Jacques Laffitte (1767–1844), banker and politician

=== 1800s ===
- Frédéric Bastiat (1801–1850), classical-liberal author and political economist
- Hélène Feillet (1812–1889), painter and lithographer, images of the Basque Country
- Charles Lavigerie born at Bayonne in 1825 and died in 1892 at Algiers (Algérie), was a 19th-century Cardinal. He was the founder of the Society of Missionaries of Africa which is better known under the name White Fathers.
- Achille Zo (1826–1901), painter
- Léon Bonnat (1833–1922), painter
- Ramón Altarriba y Villanueva (1841–1906), Spanish Carlist politician
- Leandro Ramón Garrido (1868–1909), English–Spanish painter born in Bayonne, France
- René Cassin (1887–1976), lawyer and judge; recipient of the 1968 Nobel Peace Prize
- François Duhourcau (1883–1951), writer and historian

=== 1900s ===
- René Lasserre (1912–2006), restaurateur
- Loleh Bellon (1925–1999), actress and playwright
- Michel Camdessus (born 1933), managing director of the International Monetary Fund from 1997 to 2000
- Maurice André (1933–2012), virtuoso classical trumpet player
- Itxaro Borda (born 1959), Basque language writer
- Didier Deschamps (born 1968), World Cup winning footballer, manager of the France national team since 2012
- Sylvain Luc (1965–2024), jazz guitarist
- Anthony Dupuis (born 1973), professional tennis player
- Xavier de le Rue (born 1979), snowboarder
- Imanol Harinordoquy (born 1980), French international rugby union player
- Stéphane Ruffier (born 1986) France national football team goalkeeper
- Xavier Ouellet (born 1993), ice hockey player for the Laval Rocket
- Aymeric Laporte (born 1994), World Cup winning footballer, raised in the city
- Jessika Ponchet (born 1996), tennis player

== In popular culture ==
- In Wyndham Lewis's novel The Wild Body (1927) the protagonist, Ker-Orr, in the first story, "A Soldier of Humour", takes the train from Paris and stays in Bayonne before going to Spain.
- In Ernest Hemingway's novel The Sun Also Rises, three of the characters visit Bayonne en route to Pamplona, Spain.
- In Kim Stanley Robinson's novel The Years of Rice and Salt (2002), Bayonne is the first city recolonized by the Muslims after the total depopulation of Europe by the Black Death. Named "Baraka", its earliest colonizers were later driven out by rivals from Al-Andalus and flee to the Loire Valley, where they found the city of Nsara.
- In Trevanian's novel Shibumi, Hannah was called "a whore from Bayonne" by elderly Basque women in a village of the Northern Basque Country.
- The seventh track of Joe Bonamassa's album Dust Bowl is entitled The Last Matador of Bayonne.
- In the summer of 2008, Manu Chao's live album Baionarena was recorded in the Arena of Bayonne.
- The album Life is Elsewhere, by English band Little Comets, features a song titled Bayonne.
- The eighth track of La Nef's album La Traverse Miraculeuse is entitled "Le Navire de Bayonne".

== Notes and references ==
=== References ===
==== Insee ====
- Dossier 2013 relative to the commune,
- National Database

==== Bibliographic sources ====
- Leon H. Histoire des Juifs de Bayonne, Paris, Armand Durlacher, 1893. in-4 : xvj, 436 pp.; illustré de 4 planches hors-texte.
- Pierre Dubourg-Noves Bayonne, Ouest-France, 1986, ISBN 2 85882 609 9 (in French). Noted "DN" in the text.
- Eugène Goyheneche, Basque Country: Soule, Labourd, Lower-Navarre, Société nouvelle d’éditions régionales et de diffusion, Pau, 1979, BnF FRBNF34647711 (in French). Noted "EG" in the text.
- Pierre Hourmat, History of Bayonne from its origins to the French Revolution of 1789, Société des Sciences Lettres & Arts de Bayonne, 1986 (in French). Noted "PH" in the text.
- Pierre Hourmat Visiting Bayonne, Sud Ouest, 1989 (in French). Noted "PiH" in the text.
- Bayonne of the Nive and Adour, François Lafitte Houssat, Alan Sutton, Joué-lès-Tours, 2001, ISBN 2-84253-557-X (in French). Noted as "FL" in the text.
- The Bayonne official website. Noted as "M" in the text.
