= Bardos, Pyrénées-Atlantiques =

Administrative division in Nouvelle-Aquitaine, France

Bardos Bardoze
- Commune
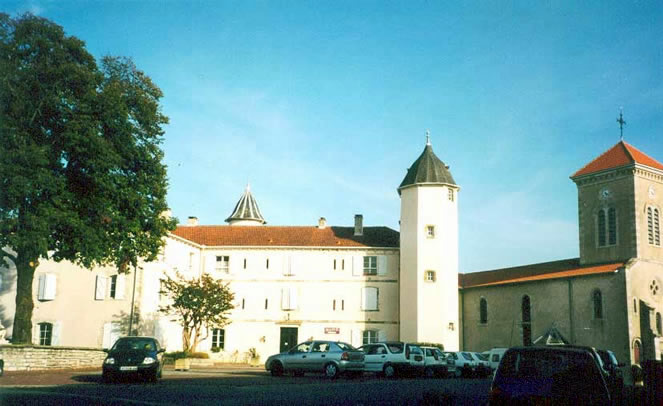
- The Town Square

- Coat of arms
- Location of Bardos
- Location within France Location within Nouvelle-Aquitaine
- Coordinates: 43°28′32″N 1°12′09″W
- Country: France
- Region: Nouvelle-Aquitaine
- Department: Pyrénées-Atlantiques
- Arrondissement: Bayonne
- Canton: Nive-Adour
- Intercommunality: CA Pays Basque

Government
  - Mayor (2020–2026): Maïder Behoteguy
- Area^{1}: 42.53 km^{2} (16.42 sq mi)
- Elevation: 180 m (590 ft)
- Highest elevation: 183 m (600 ft)
- Lowest elevation: 0 m (0 ft)
- Population (2023): 1,905
  - Density: 44.79/km^{2} (116.0/sq mi)
- Time zone: UTC+01:00 (CET)
  - Summer (DST): UTC+02:00 (CEST)
- INSEE/Postal code: 64094 /64520
- ^{1} French Land Register data, which excludes lakes, ponds, glaciers > 1 km^{2} (0.386 sq mi or 247 acres) and river estuaries.

Bardos (French pronunciation: [baʁdɔs]; Occitan: Bardòs; Basque: Bardoze) is a commune in the Pyrénées-Atlantiques department in the Nouvelle-Aquitaine region of south-western France. It is part of the former Basque province of Labourd.

== Geography ==
Bardos is located some 15 km east of Bayonne just south of Guiche. The north-eastern tip of the commune is also the departmental border between Pyrénées-Atlantiques and Landes. Access to the commune is by the D936 road from Briscous in the west which passes through the heart of the commune and the town and continues east to Bidache. The D253 goes north from the town to Guiche. The D318 goes south from the town to join the D123 west of Orègue. The D10 branches off the D936 in the west of the commune and goes south to La Bastide-Clairence. The A64 autoroute (E80) passes through the north of the commune with the nearest exit being Exit 4 which exits to the D936 just 1 km to the west of the commune. The commune is mostly farmland with scattered forested areas particularly on the slopes.

The town is served by the interurban network of Pyrénées-Atlantiques (Transports 64) by route 811 to Bayonne and Tardets-Sorholus.

There is a dense network of streams across the whole commune. The north-eastern tip of the commune has the Bidouze as the communal and the departmental border. The Ruisseau d'Ermou flows through the commune and joins the Bidouze at the north-eastern tip of the commune. The Ruisseau du Termi forms much of the northern border as it flows north-west to join the Adour north of the commune. Numerous other streams rise in the commune and flow north to the Adour. The Lihoury river forms part of the south-eastern border of the commune as it flows north, fed by the Laharanne, and joins the Bidouze east of Bidache. The Ruisseau d'Appât rises in the commune and flows south to join the Lihoury. The Arbéroue forms much of the southern border of the commune as it flows east to join the Lihoury. The Aran forms most of the western border of the commune as it flows north then turns west to join the Adour. Numerous streams flow in the heart of the commune including the Ruisseau d'Artigue, the Ithurriague, and the Bardolle.

=== Geology and terrain ===
The area of the commune is 4,253 hectares with a maximum altitude of 186 m on the Miremont hill which is the location of an old 14th century mansion as well as a water tower built on a panoramic viewpoint overlooking the Adour valley.

=== Climate ===
The climate of Bardos, some twenty kilometres from the Basque coast, is relatively similar to that of Biarritz with fairly heavy rainfall: the oceanic climate due to its proximity to the Atlantic Ocean. The average winter temperature is around 8 °C and around 20 °C in summer. The lowest temperature recorded was −12.7 °C on 16 January 1985 and the highest 40.6 °C on 4 August 2003. Rain on the Basque coast is rarely persistent except during winter storms. It often takes the form of intense thunderstorms of short duration.

Comparison of local Meteorological data with other cities in France
Town	Sunshine (hours/yr)	Rain (mm/yr)	Snow (days/yr)	Storm (days/yr)	Fog (days/yr)
National average	1,973	770	14	22	40
Bardos	1,920	1,449.8	2.2	35.5	28.5
Paris	1,661	637	12	18	10
Nice	2,724	767	1	29	1
Strasbourg	1,693	665	29	29	56
Brest	1,605	1,211	7	12	75

=== Places and hamlets ===
On the Napoleonic Cadastral Map of 1818 the commune was divided into four sections:

- Section A, Lassarrade
- Section B, Legarre
- Section C, Lerine
- Section D, Ibar

Today, although the division into districts is not precise, there are seven districts:

- Arbinoritz
- le Bourg
- Ibarre
- Lambert
- Lassarrade
- Miremont
- les Tisserands

== Town planning ==
=== Housing ===
In 2011 the total number of dwellings in the commune was 716, down from 611 in 2006.

Of these dwellings, 87% were primary residences, 6.6% were second homes, and 6.3% were occasional homes or vacant units. 69.4% of these dwellings were detached houses and 29.6% were apartments.

The proportion of principle residences owned by their occupants was 74%. The percentage of empty rental public housing was 1.3%.

== Toponymy ==
The commune name in Basque is Bardoze and its name in Occitan, gascon dialect is Bardòs.

The name consists of the root bard- or bart- which designates the low terrain and clay soils along the river edges (barthe is from the Gaulish anthroponym bardus) plus the Basque-Aquitaine suffix -os. Jean-Baptiste Orpustan proposes the meaning "place of abundant clay soil".

The following table details the origins of the commune name and other names in the commune.

Name	Spelling	Date	Source	Page	Origin	Description
Bardos	Bardos	13th century	Raymond	21	Bayonne	Village
	Bardos	1203	Orpustan	21		
	Bardos	1249	Orpustan	21		
	Bardos	1305	Orpustan	21		
	Sancta Maria de Bardos	1693	Raymond	21	Collations	
	Bardoze	19th century	Lhande			
Ascarat	Escaratz	1502	Raymond	15	Bardos	Farm
Berhabe	Berhabe	1863	Raymond	28		Farm
Castella	Castella	1863	Raymond	44		Redoubt
Gelos	l'ostau de Galos	1502	Raymond	70	Navarre	Stream rising in Bardos and Bidache and joining the Lihurry
	le Gélous	1863	Raymond	70		
Jauréguy	Jauréguy	1756	Raymond	85	Collations	Farm
Lichacz	l'ostau de Lissaze	1502	Raymond	101	Navarre	Farm
Paloumères	l'ostau de las Paloumeres	1502	Raymond	131	Navarre	Farm
Plaçoo	Plaçoo	1863	Raymond	136		Hamlet

Sources:

- Raymond: Topographic Dictionary of the Department of Basses-Pyrenees, 1863, on the page numbers indicated in the table. (in French)
- Orpustan: Jean-Baptiste Orpustan, New Basque Toponymy p. 21
- Lhande: Basque-French Dictionary

Origins:

- Bayonne: Cartulary of Bayonne or Livre d'Or (Book of Gold)
- Collations: Collations of the Diocese of Bayonne
- Bardos: Titles of Bardos
- Navarre: Titles of the Kingdom of Navarre

Bardos appears as Bardos on the 1750 Cassini Map and the same on the 1790 version.

== History ==
Bardos has a Paleolithic site. The parish of Bardos has been mentioned since 1072 and the barony of Bardos was created in 1320. The commune was incorporated into the Duchy of Gramont in 1643.

The parish of Bardos was admitted to the Biltzar of Labourd in 1763 and became a commune in 1790. Originally it was the capital of a canton including the communes of Bardos and Guiche and depended on the district of Ustaritz.

The relationship of Bardos with Labourd had some unusual features (shared with the neighbouring villages of Guiche and Urt).

During the Ancien Régime the three parishes did not dependent judicially on the judicial institutions of Labourd but on the Seneschal of Came. Although they had ceased to participate in the work of the Labourd Biltzar, they are allowed back into meetings in 1763 to contribute to the work of the Biltzar. According to Anne Zink these events had little meaning: even before this assignment, the three parishes were fiscally labourdine and it was the customs of the province of Labourd that governed their civil law.

From 1770 to 1771 the overall trustee of the Biltzar was Pierre Damestoy from Bardos, notary of the house of Etxebeheiti.

=== Heraldry ===
Arms of Bardos	Blazon: Quarterly, 1 and 4 Azure, three pales of Or; 2 and 3 Gules, an oak eradicated Argent debruised by a bear of Or walking.

== Administration ==
List of Successive Mayors

Mayors from the French Revolution to 1919

From	To	Name
1789	1789	Jean Casenave
1789	1790	Pierre Darricau
1790	1792	Gabriel Detchart
1792	1795	Pierre Darricau
1795	1795	Gabriel Detchart
1795	1797	Pierre Darricau
1797	1798	François Larre
1798	1816	Etienne Damestoy
1816	1827	Jean-Baptiste Duclercq
1827	1848	Etienne Damestoy
1848	1849	Mathieu Chapa
1849	1878	Pierre Darricau-Albinoritz
1878	1881	Bernard Celhabe
1881	1919	Pierre Damestoy

Mayors from 1919

From	To	Name	Party	Position
1919	1960	Pierre Damestoy		Veterinarian
1961	1977	Jean Damestoy		Farmer
1977	2008	Pierre Laborde		Teacher
2008	2020	Jean Paul Diribarne		Metallurgist
2020	2026	Maïder Behoteguy		

=== Judicial and administrative proceedings ===
Bardos falls within the area of the Tribunal d'instance (District court) of Bayonne, the Tribunal de grande instance (High Court) of Bayonne, the Cour d'appel (Court of Appeal) of Pau, the Tribunal pour enfants (Juvenile court) of Bayonne, the Conseil de prud'hommes (Labour Court) of Bayonne, the Tribunal de commerce (Commercial Court) of Bayonne, the Tribunal administratif (Administrative tribunal) of Pau, and the Cour administrative d'appel (Administrative Court of Appeal) of Bordeaux.

=== Inter-communality ===
The town belongs to nine inter-communal structures:

- the Communauté d'agglomération du Pays Basque;
- the AEP association for the Bidache region;
- the sanitation association of Adour-Ursuia;
- the energy association for Pyrénées-Atlantiques;
- the inter-communal association to protect the banks of the Adour and its tributaries (SIPBAMA)
- the inter-communal association for the industrial area of Ayherre;
- the inter-communal association for the support of Basque culture;
- the Joint association for the Berriak Erreka;
- the association for the Z.A. Etxecolu industrial area at Bardos.

Bardos was not part of any community of communes until 1 January 2010 when it joined the community of communes of Pays de Bidache. Bardos is the headquarters of the Joint association for the Berriak Erreka and also for the union for the association for the Z.A. Etxecolu industrial area.

=== Environmental policy ===
"Environment and Waste" policy is under inter-communal jurisdiction with household waste collection and sorting for the commune being provided by the Community of communes of Pays de Bidache.

The treatment of the waste is then managed by the Bil Ta Garbi joint association.

== Demography ==
The inhabitants of the commune are known as Bardoztars.

Historical population

Year	Pop.	±% p.a.
1793	2,451	—
1800	2,283	−1.01%
1806	2,418	+0.96%
1821	2,300	−0.33%
1831	2,468	+0.71%
1836	2,641	+1.36%
1841	2,612	−0.22%
1846	2,660	+0.36%
1851	2,612	−0.36%
1856	2,586	−0.20%
1861	2,518	−0.53%
1866	2,542	+0.19%
1872	2,304	−1.63%
1876	1,912	−4.56%
1881	1,733	−1.95%
1886	1,805	+0.82%
1891	1,708	−1.10%
1896	1,722	+0.16%
1901	1,772	+0.57%

Year	Pop.	±% p.a.
1906	1,675	−1.12%
1911	1,662	−0.16%
1921	1,519	−0.90%
1926	1,520	+0.01%
1931	1,514	−0.08%
1936	1,535	+0.28%
1946	1,280	−1.80%
1954	1,175	−1.06%
1962	1,091	−0.92%
1968	1,031	−0.94%
1975	1,005	−0.36%
1982	1,093	+1.21%
1990	1,188	+1.05%
1999	1,271	+0.75%
2007	1,553	+2.54%
2012	1,672	+1.49%
2017	1,828	+1.80%
2023	1,905	+0.69%

Source: EHESS and INSEE

== Economy ==
Until the 19th century Bardos was renowned for its lapidary activity.

The commune is part of the Appellation d'origine contrôlée (AOC) zone designation of Ossau-iraty.

There are two industrial estates: Etxekolu and Saint-Martin. The EKI Basque brewery is located in Bardos.

=== Household incomes and taxation ===
In 2011 the median household income tax was €32,753, placing Bardos at 11,125th place among the 31,886 communes with more than 49 households in metropolitan France.

=== Tourism ===
The tourist office of Pays de Bidache covers all seven communes of the community to which Bardos belongs. It is located in Bidache.

The Pays de Bidache is itself a member of the Tourist Information Organisation (PAT) of Nive-Adour-Ursuia with Pays de Hasparren.

The commune has two furnished rural cottages for visitors.

== Facilities ==
=== Education ===
Bardos is located in the Academy of Bordeaux zone.

There are two primary schools in Bardos:

- the Saint Mary private school
- a Public School

There is no Basque education available in the commune.

The college for the commune is located in Bidache (5.6 km away).

The high school for the commune is the General René-Cassin High School located in Bayonne (28.7 km away).

=== Health ===
The town has a retirement home called Albodi.

=== Sports ===
The various sports clubs and associations in the village have several facilities available:

- a Fronton
- a trinquete with a wall on the left for Basque pelota
- two tennis courts
- a rugby stadium

In 2011 a building was built next to the sports field for sports like weightlifting and with a dance hall: Erdizka. In 2012 a bowling alley has started near Erdizka.

There are several sports associations in the commune which allow residents regular exercise and sports: clay pigeon shooting, gymnastics, fitness, hiking, walking, Basque pelota, rugby, tennis, judo, and pilates.

=== Media ===
There is no local media specific to Bardos except for Bardos-Info, a Municipal Bulletin published by the mayor with various articles from local associations.

There are three TV networks available in the commune:

- Euskal Telebista (Basque government channel covering all of Basque Country)
- France 3 Euskal Herri (a local branch of the national media)
- TVPI (a local channel covering the Basque Country, Landes and Béarn)

News about the village is relayed to the press by local correspondents for three newspapers:

- Herria (weekly newspaper in Basque)
- La Semaine du Pays Basque (The Week in Basque Country) (weekly newspaper in French)
- Sud Ouest Pays basque (South West Basque Country) (a daily newspaper in French).

=== Worship ===
Bardos is in the parish of Notre Dame du Chemin de Saint-Jacques (Our Lady of the Way of Saint-James) in the diocese of Bayonne which depends on the Church of the Assumption.

The communal cemetery is located along the D936. It was once located around the church and was moved to this location in May 1861.

== Culture and heritage ==
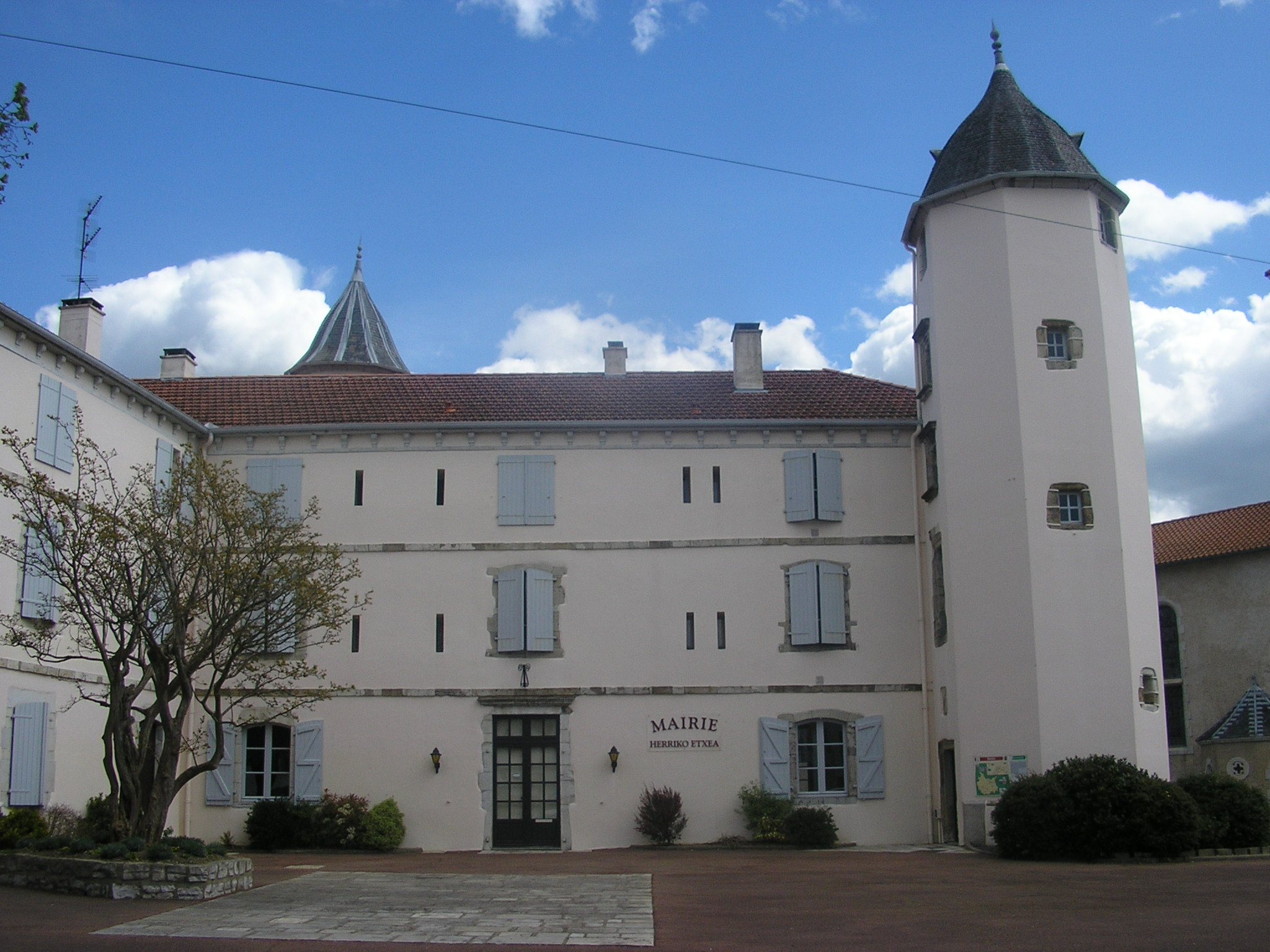
North facade of the Château de Salha

=== Civil heritage ===
The commune has many buildings and sites that are registered as historical monuments:

- The Chateau de Miremont (15th century). The Chateau is at 188 metres above sea level and offers panoramic views of the River Adour, Landes and the Pyrenees.
- Houses and Farms (16th-20th century)
- The Chateau de Salha (1655)
- The Ermont Mill (15th century)

Other sites of interest

- A Gaztelu zahar (prehistoric fortified mound) was used as a Napoleonic redoubt (stone parapets).

=== Religious heritage ===
The Parish Church of the Assumption of the Blessed Virgin Mary (19th century). It is located at the highest point in the village at 128 metres above sea level. The Church contains many items that are registered as historical objects:

- A Monumental Cross: Christ on the Cross (17th century)
- A Monumental Painting (19th century)
- The Furniture in the Church
- The entire decor in the choir (4 Columns and a corniche) (19th century)
- A Baptismal font (19th century)
- 4 Altar Candlesticks (19th century)
- 4 Statues: Saints Peter and John, Sacred Heart, Virgin and child (19th century)
- A Pulpit Cross (18th century)
- A Pulpit (17th century)
- A Confessional (19th century)
- A set of 2 Confessionals (19th century)
- The Virgin Altar, Retable, Altar painting, Tabernacle, and statue (19th century)
- The Saint Joseph Altar, Retable, Altar painting, Tabernacle, and statue (19th century)
- 4 Altar Candlesticks (19th century)
- An Altarpiece on the Retable of the main Altar (19th century)
- The main Altar seating, Retable, and Tabernacle (19th century)
- The main Altar (19th century)

=== Cultural Heritage ===
Language

According to the Map of the Seven Basque Provinces by Prince Louis Lucien Bonaparte dating from 1863, the dialect spoken in Bardos is eastern Low Navarrese. The village had its own dialect known as the dialect of Bardos which is also spoken on the neighbouring commune of Orègue. Notably, although Basque people were the majority, Gascon was once spoken by a significant part of the population, often more than Basque.

Sayings and proverbs

A local Basque saying:
Que bas entau Bidache ? Pot de grache.
Que bas entau Bardos ? Chuque aquét os.
A Bardos que minjà la carne e que dachen lous os.

meaning:

You go to Bidache? Pot of fat.
You go to Bardos? Suck the bone.
In Bardos, eat the meat and leave the bone.

Nicknames

The people of Bardos, who are known as bardoztar have, like most of their neighbours, funny nicknames in Basque and in Gascon:

- "Xarnegu arraza" (in Basque: "mixed race")
- "Los sents" (in Gascon: "the saints")

=== Environmental heritage ===
Two Natura 2000 areas are partially within the territory of the commune:

- the Aran river (also called Joyeuse)
- the Bidouze river.

In addition there are three Zone naturelle d'intérêt écologique, faunistique et floristique (Natural areas of ecological interest, flora and fauna) (ZNIEFF) which are fully or partially located on the territory of the commune:

- the Landes of Arberoue;
- the Hydrographic Network of the Bidouze and Arberoue
- the Joyeuse Valley

=== Cultural events and festivities ===
The premier event of the year in the commune is the Carnaval Labourdin (Labourdin Carnival) that spans three weekends and includes visits to houses in the districts by day and festive evenings on the town square. It is organized by the Foyer de Bardos, a local cultural association.

The Xarnegu Eguna festival that mixes Basque and Gascon cultures is also organized by the association of the same name every year around 1 May.

For over 30 years the Foyer de Bardos has organised an exhibition of contemporary art in order to diversify the cultural offering in rural areas. It takes place every summer between 15 June and 15 July.

The festivals are organized in Bardos by the Comité des Fêtes de Bardos (Festival Committee of Bardos) every summer around 15 August. The committee includes a large part of the villagers.

== Notable people linked to the commune ==
- Salvat Diharce (?-1601), born in Bardos, tenured priest in the Abbey of Arthous (at Hastingues), Bishop of Tarbes
- Dominique de Lissabe Navy and privateer captain
- Salvat Monho, Basque language writer
- Valentin de Salha (17 January 1758 – 14 April 1841), born at Bardos, Knight of Salha, Captain and Major-General of Division
- Juan Martin Hiribarren (8 May 1810 – 26 November 1866), priest at Bardos, Basque language writer
- Jean-Pierre Duvoisin (16 May 1810 – 30 January 1891), Captain of Customs and Basque language writer
- Michel Labéguerie (4 March 1921 – 28 July 1980), family from Bardos, democrat-Christian politician, abertzale
- André Dassary (10 September 1912 – 7 July 1987), popular French singer
- Killers, a heavy metal French musical group from Bardos

Notable people Picture Gallery

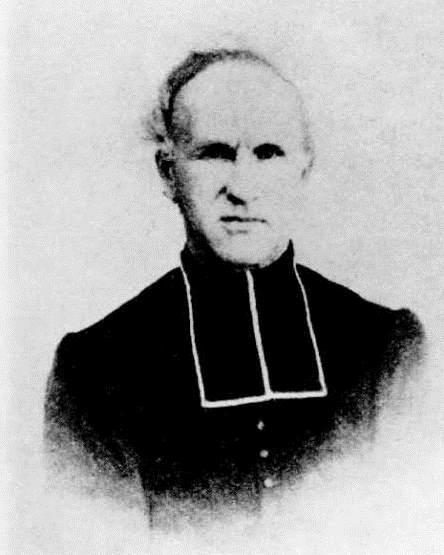
Juan Martin Hiribarren

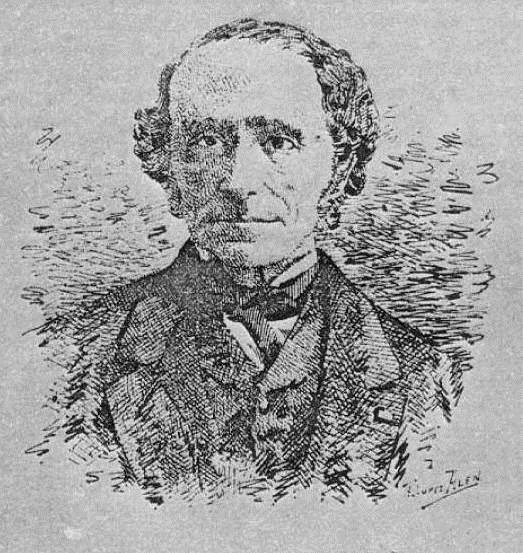
Jean-Pierre Duvoisin

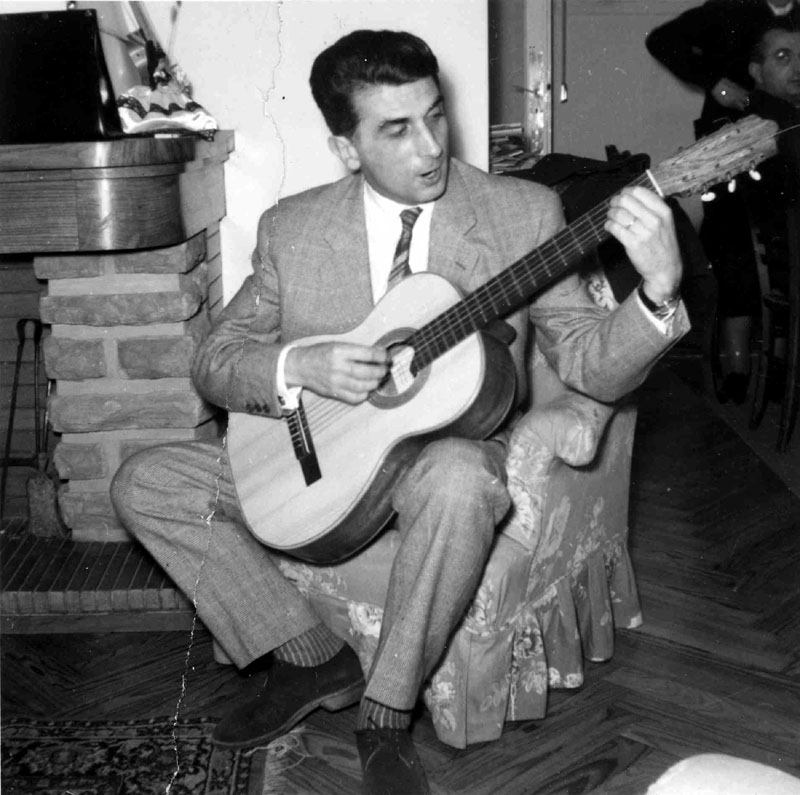
Michel Labéguerie

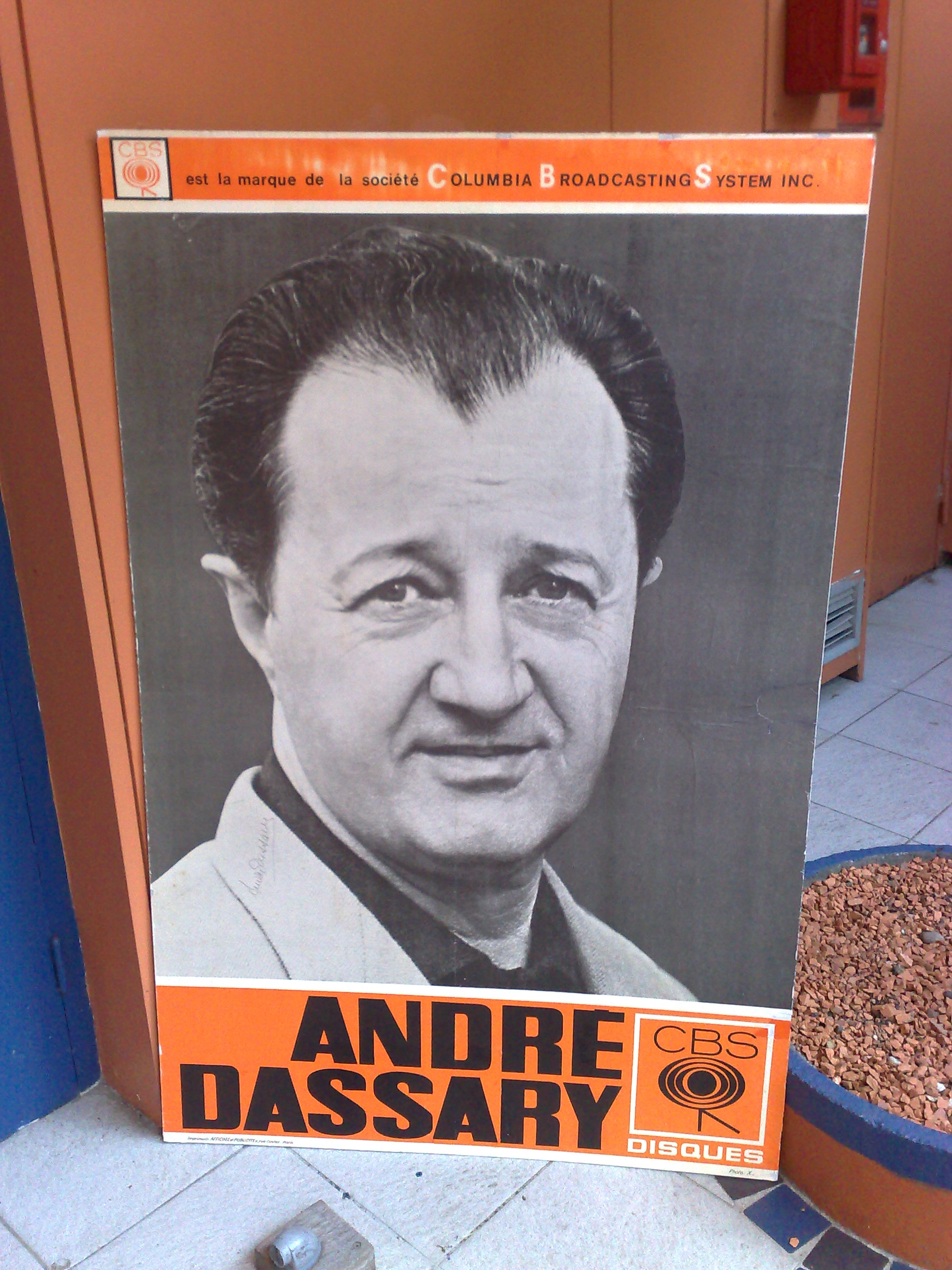
André Dassary

== See also ==
- Communes of the Pyrénées-Atlantiques department
