= Basque Eurocity Bayonne-San Sebastián =

Urban cross-border region between Spain and France in the Bay of Biscay

The Eurociudad Vasca Bayona-San Sebastián (Spanish: Eurociudad Vasca Bayona-San Sebastián; French: Eurocité basque Bayonne-Saint-Sébastien; Occitan: Cità Euro basca Baiona-Sant Sebastià; Basque: Baiona-Donostia Euskal Eurohiria) is the name given to the urban cross-border region located between Spain and France along the coast of the Cantabrian Sea in the Bay of Biscay.

Given the progressive European integration and the disappearance of internal borders in the European Union, as of 1993 various local institutions on both sides of the border created cross-border cooperation agreements that have led to the creation of a cross-border city project that brings together 42 local entities, both Spanish and French. This project covers the realization of common projects (synergies in the tourism sector, freight transport, use of common infrastructures, etc.). The consortium that directs the eurocity project has the legal entity of a European economic interest group (Groupement européen d'intérêt économique). In the future it could become a eurodistrict.

The project is based on the existence of a real urban region that crosses the border, on the existence of synergies and complementarities between both sides of the border and on the existence of a common Basque cultural base. The three official languages of the institution are Spanish, French and Basque.

== Description ==
The Basque Eurocity stretches linearly for just over 50 km along the Basque Coast. On the one hand, it encompasses the coastal region of the French department of the Pyrenees-Atlantiques (Côte Basque), between the mouth of the Adour River and the Bidasoa River. It is a relatively flat and traditionally tourism-oriented region, heavily urbanized, but with a relatively low population density, since a large part of the homes are single-family homes, second homes or are tourism-oriented.

On the other side of the Bidasoa river, the Eurocity extends through the Gipuzkoan regions of Bidasoaldea, San Sebastián region and part of Urola Kosta, reaching the town of Getaria at one end. The Spanish part is geographically more rugged than the French, being therefore less urbanized, but it has a different urban typology, with locations with a higher population density and a more industrial character; so it has a larger population.

The two poles of the Eurocity are the city of San Sebastián, on the one hand, and the BAB District (Bayonne-Anglet-Biarritz) on the other. At its central axis are the towns of Hondarribia, Irun and Hendaye, which have further deepened cross-border relations with the Bidasoa-Txingudi Consortium.

== Localities that comprise it ==
The Eurocity has approximately 620,000 inhabitants divided into 42 local entities.

- 25 French communes, all of them belonging to the Department of the Pyrenees-Atlantiques and the Basque-French Country (historical province of Labort):

City	Population
Ahetze	1,318
Anglet	36,800
Arbonne	1,375
Arcangues	2,733
Ascain	3,097
Bassussarry	1,817
Bayonne	44,300
Biarritz	30,055
Bidart	4,670
Biriatou	831
Boucau	7,007
Ciboure	6,283
Guéthary	1,284
Halsou	503
Hendaye	12,596
Jatxou	811
Lahonce	1,890
Larressore	1,320
Saint Jean de Luz	13,247
Saint-Pée-sur-Nivelle	4,331
Sara	2,184
Souraïde	1,082
Saint-Pierre-d'Irube	3,873
Urrugne	7,043
Villefranque	1,742
Total	192,192

- 17 Spanish municipalities, all of them belonging to the Province of Gipuzkoa in the Basque Autonomous Community:

City	Population
Aia	1,751
Andoain	13,993
Astigarraga	4,388
Hondarribia	16,073
Getaria	2,547
Hernani	19,138
Irun	60,261
Lasarte-Oria	17,647
Lezo	5,912
Orio	4,643
Oiartzun	9,728
Pasaia	16,104
Errenteria	39,276
Donostia-San Sebastián	183,308
Urnieta	6,094
Usurbil	5,669
Zarautz	22,353
Total	428,885

== History ==
On 18 January 1993, Henri Grenet, president of the Bayonne-Anglet-Biarritz District, and Eli Galdos, deputy general of the Gipuzkoa Provincial Council, signed a cross-border cooperation agreement that would be the germ of the Basque Eurocity.

In 1997 the Bayonne-San Sebastián cross-border observatory was created by the Provincial Council of Gipuzkoa and the Bayonne-Anglet-Biarritz District (converted into the Bayonne-Anglet-Biarritz agglomeration community), under the legal form of an Association European Economic Interest.

In 2001, the Bidasoa-Txingudi Consortium, which brought together the municipalities of Irun, Hondarribia and Hendaye, joined the Eurocity.
