= Urcuit =

Urcuit Urketa (Basque)
- Commune
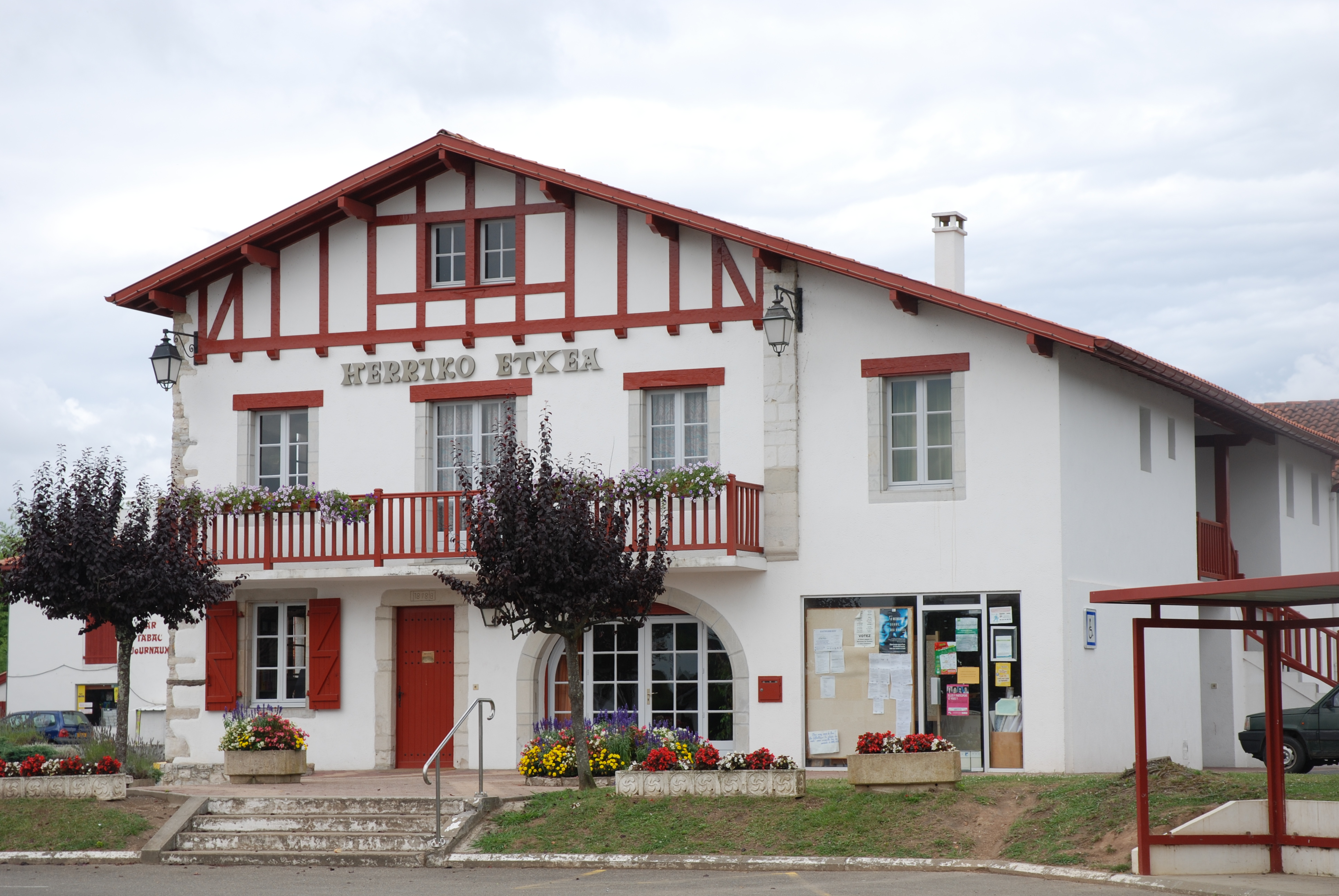
- Town hall

- Coat of arms
- Location of Urcuit
- Location within France Location within Nouvelle-Aquitaine
- Coordinates: 43°29′11″N 1°20′07″W
- Country: France
- Region: Nouvelle-Aquitaine
- Department: Pyrénées-Atlantiques
- Arrondissement: Bayonne
- Canton: Nive-Adour
- Intercommunality: CA Pays Basque

Government
  - Mayor (2020–2026): Raymond Darricarrere
- Area^{1}: 13.69 km^{2} (5.29 sq mi)
- Elevation: 50 m (160 ft)
- Highest elevation: 66 m (217 ft)
- Lowest elevation: 0 m (0 ft)
- Population (2023): 3,047
  - Density: 222.6/km^{2} (576.5/sq mi)
- Time zone: UTC+01:00 (CET)
  - Summer (DST): UTC+02:00 (CEST)
- INSEE/Postal code: 64540 /64990
- ^{1} French Land Register data, which excludes lakes, ponds, glaciers > 1 km^{2} (0.386 sq mi or 247 acres) and river estuaries.

Urcuit (French pronunciation: [yʁkɥit]; Occitan: Escalfat; Basque: Urketa) is a small village and a commune in the Pyrénées-Atlantiques department in south-western France. It is part of the traditional Basque province of Labourd.

== Population ==
Historical population
Year	Pop.	±% p.a.
1968	749	—
1975	882	+2.36%
1982	1,329	+6.03%
1990	1,688	+3.03%
1999	1,796	+0.69%
2007	2,063	+1.75%
2012	2,326	+2.43%
2017	2,492	+1.39%
2023	3,047	+3.41%
Source: INSEE

== See also ==
- Communes of the Pyrénées-Atlantiques department
