= Sames, Pyrénées-Atlantiques =

Sames Samatze (Basque)
- Commune
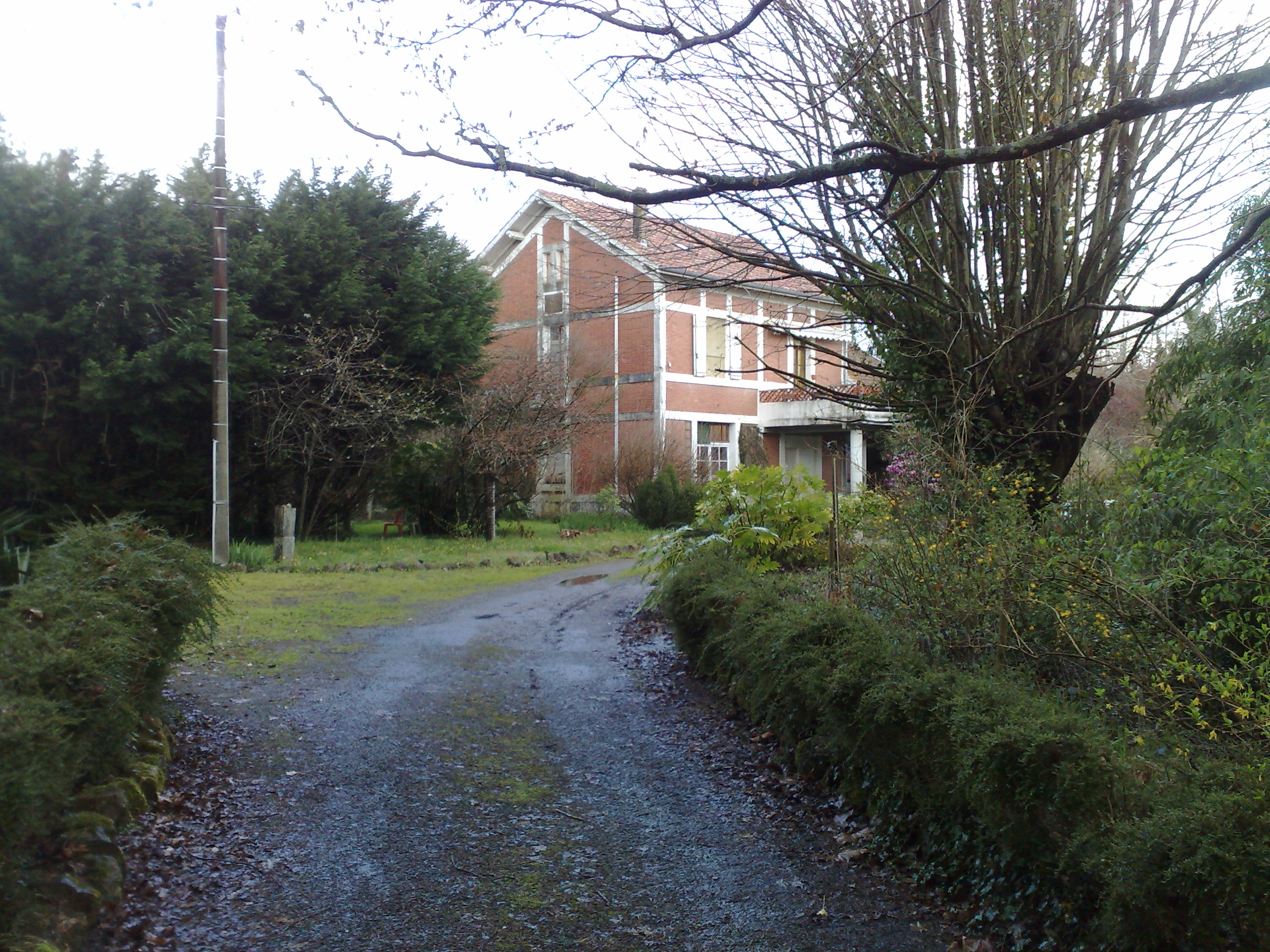
- The old railway station

- Coat of arms
- Location of Sames
- Location within France Location within Nouvelle-Aquitaine
- Coordinates: 43°31′30″N 1°09′19″W
- Country: France
- Region: Nouvelle-Aquitaine
- Department: Pyrénées-Atlantiques
- Arrondissement: Bayonne
- Canton: Nive-Adour
- Intercommunality: CA Pays Basque

Government
  - Mayor (2020–2026): Yves Pons
- Area^{1}: 13 km^{2} (5.0 sq mi)
- Elevation: 42 m (138 ft)
- Highest elevation: 58 m (190 ft)
- Lowest elevation: 0 m (0 ft)
- Population (2023): 709
  - Density: 55/km^{2} (140/sq mi)
- Demonym: Samot
- Time zone: UTC+01:00 (CET)
  - Summer (DST): UTC+02:00 (CEST)
- INSEE/Postal code: 64502 /64520
- ^{1} French Land Register data, which excludes lakes, ponds, glaciers > 1 km^{2} (0.386 sq mi or 247 acres) and river estuaries.

Sames (French pronunciation: [sam]; Occitan: Samas; Basque: Samatze) is a commune in the Pyrénées-Atlantiques department in southwestern France. It is considered part of the Basque Country province of Lower Navarre (Basque: Behe Nafarroa).

== Geography ==
Sames lies in the valley of the Adour, a major river running to the Bay of Biscay. It is located on a low plain between the Adour, Gaves, and Bidouze rivers. An outcrop of the Pyrenees rises some 60 m over the plain, blocking the Bidouze to the north and east.

North of Sames is the hilly country of southern Landes, formed from rocks and soil left by receding glaciers over 20 million years. The Adour valley extends west to the bay, about 35 km away. South of Sames are the foothills of the Pyrenees, which reach a height of 150 m just across the river, 600 m about 15 km from the commune, and 900 m at a distance of 20 km.

=== Neighbourhoods ===
The commune is organized into several neighbourhoods, with distinct personalities partly shaped by history:

- Le Bourg, a small borough uphill, consists of a cluster of homes around a medieval church. Traces of human habitation have been found dating back to the 3rd century.
- Quartier Saint-Jean dates back at least to the late Middle Ages. It developed around a hostel belonging to the Order of Malta that was established around 1445, with a hospital facility and rooms for travellers to and from Spain. Until the late 18th century, the settlement was organised as a self-supporting hamlet and had its own church and graveyard.
- Vic Neuf (also known as Vic Nau) is a rural zone with dispersed homes sloping down from Le Bourg to the banks of the Bidouze.
- Vic de Lalande is a rolling upland stretching from Le Bourg to the neighbouring communes of Hastingues and Bidache. It was originally farmland but now has many new homes.
- Le Îles, a sparse strip of farms along the banks of the Gaves and Adour, derives its name from small river islets that stood there in the 16th century and have since disappeared. (Some similar islets still exist downstream at Lahonce and Sainte-Marie-de-Gosse.)
- Moura is a real-estate zone developing around a reservoir that was created in the early 1990s during a huge civil works project for a nearby highway linking Toulouse to Bayonne.

== Demographics ==
Historical population

Year	Pop.	±% p.a.
1793	780	—
1821	857	+0.34%
1846	954	+0.43%
1872	891	−0.26%
1901	831	−0.24%
1926	582	−1.41%
1946	536	−0.41%
1962	460	−0.95%
1968	443	−0.63%

Year	Pop.	±% p.a.
1975	422	−0.69%
1982	424	+0.07%
1990	378	−1.43%
1999	387	+0.26%
2007	578	+5.14%
2012	801	+6.74%
2017	699	−2.69%
2023	709	+0.24%

Source: EHESS and INSEE

== Economy ==
The economy of Sames is based on agriculture, primarily maize, kiwi, and (to a somewhat lesser extent) vegetables.
Local craftsmen also make blades and knives in a typical Pyrenean style.

== History ==
=== Settlement ===
Artifacts discovered in Sames (such as a set of 3rd-century Roman bronze coins found in the recess of a wall) indicate that some type of settlement, probably agricultural, existed at the hilltop site of Le Bourg in ancient times. The local church—built in a simple Roman style, which was all that a very rural parish could afford—has been dated back to the early 14th century. The first documents mentioning the commune by its current name are from 1255; several minor mentions can be found from throughout the 13th and 14th centuries.

The history of the commune is closely tied to the Order of Malta, which, around 1445, built a hostel and hospital on the bank of the Bidouze to supplement facilities in the nearby port city of Bayonne. They named the site after the Order's patron saint, John (in French, Saint Jean), and the neighbourhood was known as Saint-Jean-d'Etchart until the Order left in the late 18th century. ("Etchart" is most likely of Basque origin; a nearby swampy area is still known as "Etchouette".) The Order also established a chapel that served as a secondary church for locals, and they sustained their right to be buried there until a royal decree in 1668 forbade it. Several buildings from that period, dating to the early 1600s, are still standing.

In the late 18th and early 19th centuries, a few wealthy landowners built mansions in the village: three on the hilltop (the first around 1775; the other two, more lavish and surrounded by parks and gardens, around 1850) and one in 1807 on the site of the old Order of Malta establishment.

=== Political control ===
While Sames itself held no strategic interest, being devoid of any military stronghold, the area at large was in constant turmoil because of rivalries between the powers that ruled the Aquitaine region and northern Spain.

Until the late 12th century, the area was part of the province of Labourd, ruled from Bayonne and included in the dukedom of Aquitaine, and hence the realm of France. The local powers were the lords of Guiche, 1.5 km away across the Bidouze, and the Abbey of Arthous 2 km away on the other side of the hills, which was founded in 1160 and served as a staging ground for pilgrims to Santiago de Compostela in Spain.

However, in 1193, Richard I of England, who was also duke of Aquitaine and, as such, a vassal to the king of France, agreed to relinquish sovereignty over a strip of land—located next to the Earldom of Béarn and stretching from the Pyrenees down to the Adour—to his father-in-law, Sancho VI of Navarre, who ruled over northern Spain. This land was then integrated into the kingdom of Navarre under the name Lower Navarre (French: Basse-Navarre; Basque: Neferroa Beheroa), and thus removed from the realm of France for the next four centuries.

Sames, hemmed in at the confluence of the three rivers, remained under French control but found itself politically isolated. It was cut off from the village of Oeyregave to the northeast by the Earl of Orthe's fortress at Peyrehorade, and from the rest of Labourd by the Bidouze river, on the opposite bank of which was set a ring of villages belonging to Navarre. It was also cut off from its southwestern neighbours beyond Bidache, where a fortress was built in 1325 by the Earl of Gramont, and from Guiche to the south, which had a strong fortress dating back to the 11th century. Additionally, in 1289, the Duke of Aquitaine—who controlled Bayonne, the only port between Spain and Bordeaux—established a stronghold on the hilltop of Hastingues half a mile away under an agreement with the Abbey of Arthous (which sought protection from the Earl of Orthe).

As a result of this isolation, the commune's jurisdictional, police, and fiscal situation were blurred until two decisive steps were taken in the second half of the 16th century:

1. In 1563, Sames and neighbouring villages to the south were integrated into the new Earldom of Guiche, created by King Charles IX of France on behalf of the Gramont family. Sames was thus clearly reinstated into the province of Labourd.
2. In 1589, Henry of Navarre became King Henry IV of France, ending Lower Navarre's four centuries of detachment from France.

In 1790, when the territorial divisions of France were reorganized by the French Revolution, Sames and its neighbours in Labourd and Lower Navarre were placed in the Basses-Pyrénées department, later renamed Pyrénées-Atlantiques.

== Culture ==
Since 2006, Sames has been the seat (at Quartier Saint-Jean) of an association dedicated to the promotion of lyric arts. The association organizes performances of comic operas for Sames and surrounding communes.
