= Canton of Nive-Adour =

Coordinates: 43.47°N 1.42°W

The canton of Nive-Adour is an administrative division of the Pyrénées-Atlantiques department, southwestern France. It was created at the French canton reorganisation which came into effect in March 2015. Its seat is in Mouguerre.

It consists of the following communes:

1. Bardos
2. Briscous
3. Guiche
4. Lahonce
5. Mouguerre
6. Saint-Pierre-d'Irube
7. Sames
8. Urcuit
9. Urt
10. Villefranque
