= Mouguerre =

Mouguerre Mugerre
- Commune
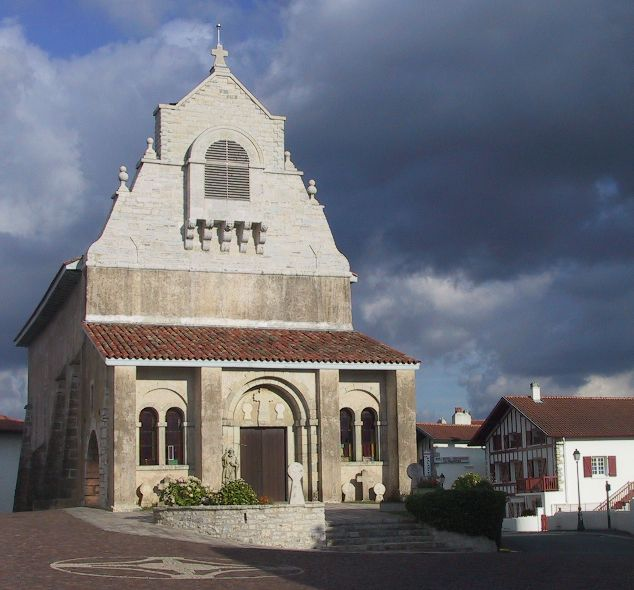
- The church of Mouguerre
- Location of Mouguerre
- Location within France Location within Nouvelle-Aquitaine
- Coordinates: 43°28′10″N 1°24′54″W
- Country: France
- Region: Nouvelle-Aquitaine
- Department: Pyrénées-Atlantiques
- Arrondissement: Bayonne
- Canton: Nive-Adour
- Intercommunality: CA Pays Basque

Government
  - Mayor (2020–2026): Roland Hirigoyen
- Area^{1}: 22.57 km^{2} (8.71 sq mi)
- Elevation: 75 m (246 ft)
- Highest elevation: 146 m (479 ft)
- Lowest elevation: 0 m (0 ft)
- Population (2023): 5,428
  - Density: 240.5/km^{2} (622.9/sq mi)
- Time zone: UTC+01:00 (CET)
  - Summer (DST): UTC+02:00 (CEST)
- INSEE/Postal code: 64407 /64990
- ^{1} French Land Register data, which excludes lakes, ponds, glaciers > 1 km^{2} (0.386 sq mi or 247 acres) and river estuaries.

Mouguerre (French pronunciation: [muɡɛʁ]; Occitan: Moguerre, Basque: Mugerre) is a village and a commune in the Pyrénées-Atlantiques department in South-Western France. It is part of the traditional Basque province of Labourd.

== Population ==
Historical population
Year	Pop.	±% p.a.
1968	1,593	—
1975	1,809	+1.83%
1982	2,290	+3.43%
1990	3,021	+3.52%
1999	3,765	+2.48%
2007	4,458	+2.13%
2012	4,741	+1.24%
2017	5,108	+1.50%
2023	5,428	+1.02%
Source: INSEE

== See also ==
- Communes of the Pyrénées-Atlantiques department
