= Lahonce =

Lahonce Lehuntze
- Commune
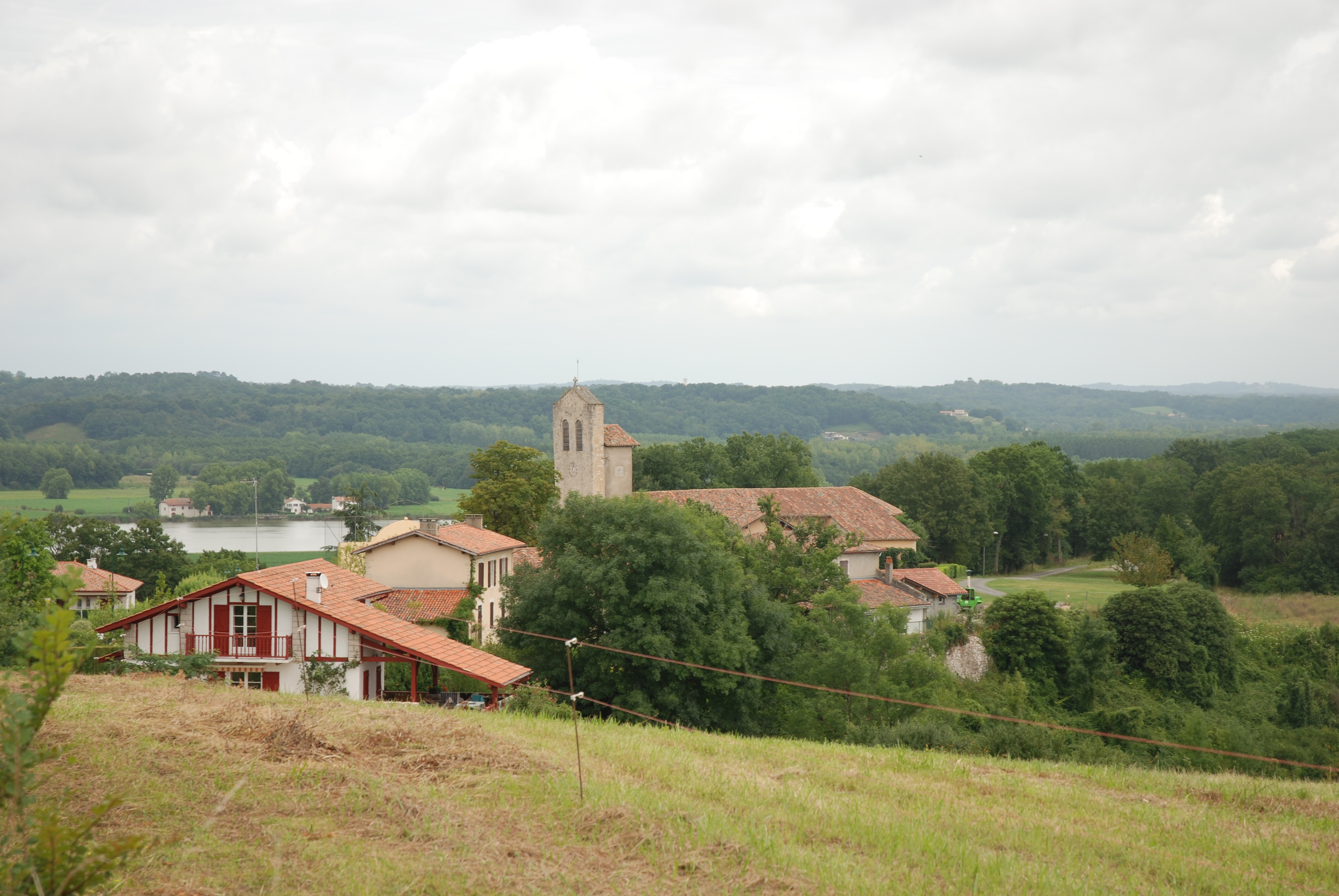
- A general view of Lahonce

- Coat of arms
- Location of Lahonce
- Location within France Location within Nouvelle-Aquitaine
- Coordinates: 43°29′00″N 1°23′24″W
- Country: France
- Region: Nouvelle-Aquitaine
- Department: Pyrénées-Atlantiques
- Arrondissement: Bayonne
- Canton: Nive-Adour
- Intercommunality: CA Pays Basque

Government
  - Mayor (2020–2026): David Hugla
- Area^{1}: 9.47 km^{2} (3.66 sq mi)
- Elevation: 43 m (141 ft)
- Highest elevation: 96 m (315 ft)
- Lowest elevation: 0 m (0 ft)
- Population (2023): 2,740
  - Density: 289/km^{2} (749/sq mi)
- Time zone: UTC+01:00 (CET)
  - Summer (DST): UTC+02:00 (CEST)
- INSEE/Postal code: 64304 /64990
- ^{1} French Land Register data, which excludes lakes, ponds, glaciers > 1 km^{2} (0.386 sq mi or 247 acres) and river estuaries.

Lahonce (French pronunciation: [la.ɔ̃s]; Basque: Lehuntze) is a village and a commune in the Pyrénées-Atlantiques department in south-western France. It is part of the traditional Basque province of Labourd.

== Population ==
Historical population
Year	Pop.	±% p.a.
1968	616	—
1975	820	+4.17%
1982	1,124	+4.61%
1990	1,496	+3.64%
1999	1,890	+2.63%
2007	1,964	+0.48%
2012	2,041	+0.77%
2017	2,418	+3.45%
2023	2,740	+2.11%
Source: INSEE

== See also ==
- Communes of the Pyrénées-Atlantiques department
