= Saint-Pierre-d'Irube =

Saint-Pierre-d'Irube Hiriburu (Basque)
- Commune
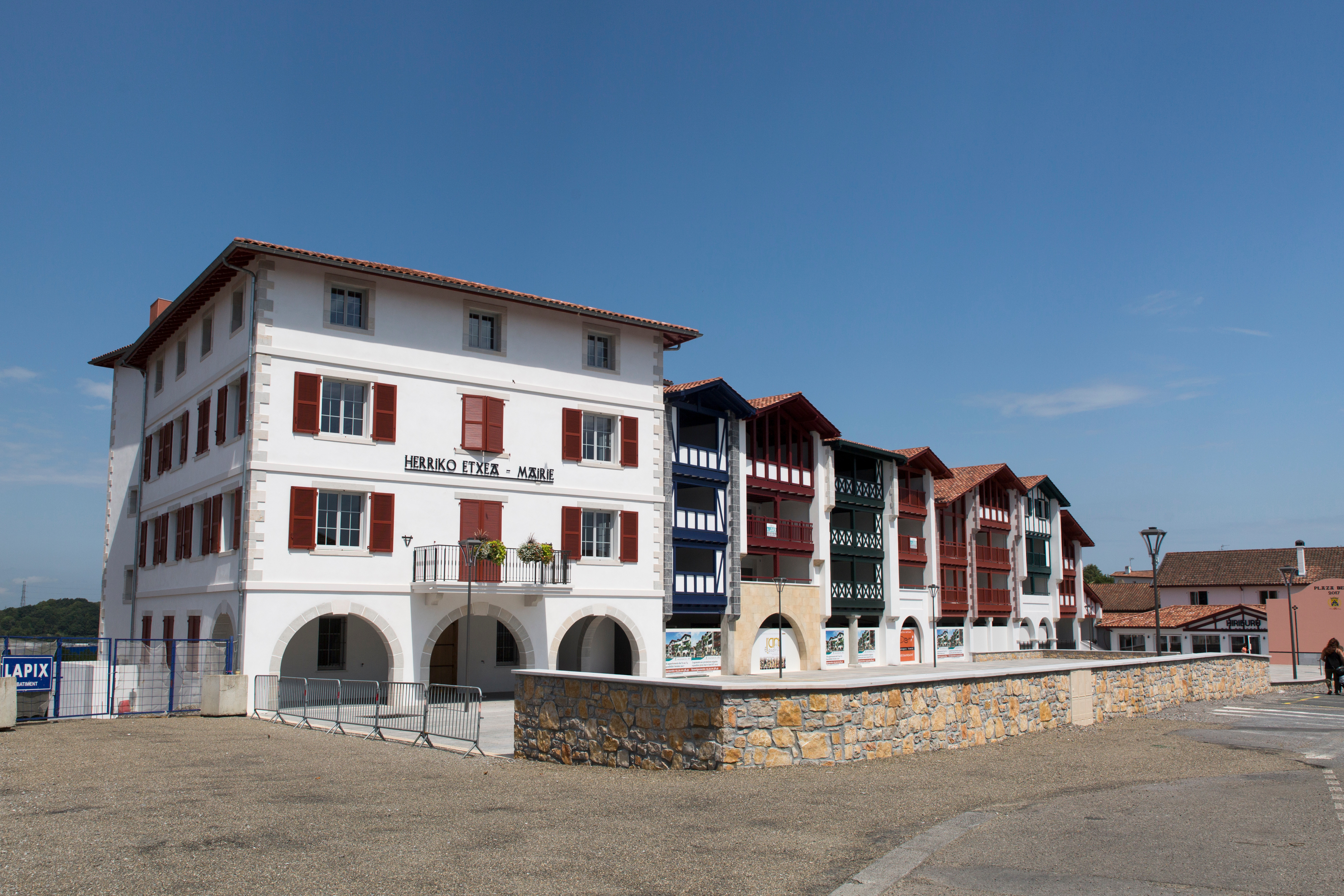
- Town hall
- Location of Saint-Pierre-d'Irube
- Location within France Location within Nouvelle-Aquitaine
- Coordinates: 43°28′38″N 1°27′28″W
- Country: France
- Region: Nouvelle-Aquitaine
- Department: Pyrénées-Atlantiques
- Arrondissement: Bayonne
- Canton: Nive-Adour
- Intercommunality: CA Pays Basque

Government
  - Mayor (2020–2026): Alain Iriart
- Area^{1}: 7.68 km^{2} (2.97 sq mi)
- Elevation: 37 m (121 ft)
- Highest elevation: 146 m (479 ft)
- Lowest elevation: 0 m (0 ft)
- Population (2023): 5,900
  - Density: 770/km^{2} (2,000/sq mi)
- Demonym(s): Saint-Pierrots, Hiriburuar
- Time zone: UTC+01:00 (CET)
  - Summer (DST): UTC+02:00 (CEST)
- INSEE/Postal code: 64496 /64990
- ^{1} French Land Register data, which excludes lakes, ponds, glaciers > 1 km^{2} (0.386 sq mi or 247 acres) and river estuaries.

Saint-Pierre-d'Irube (French pronunciation: [sɛ̃ pjɛʁ diʁyb]; Occitan: Sent-Pèire-d'Irube; Basque: Hiriburu) is a village and a commune in the Pyrénées-Atlantiques department in south-western France. It is part of the traditional Basque province of Labourd.

== Population ==
Historical population
Year	Pop.	±% p.a.
1968	1,469	—
1975	2,608	+8.55%
1982	3,164	+2.80%
1990	3,676	+1.89%
1999	3,873	+0.58%
2007	4,483	+1.85%
2012	4,605	+0.54%
2017	4,844	+1.02%
2023	5,900	+3.34%
Source: INSEE

== See also ==
- Communes of the Pyrénées-Atlantiques department
