= Urt =

Urt Ahurti (Basque)
- Commune
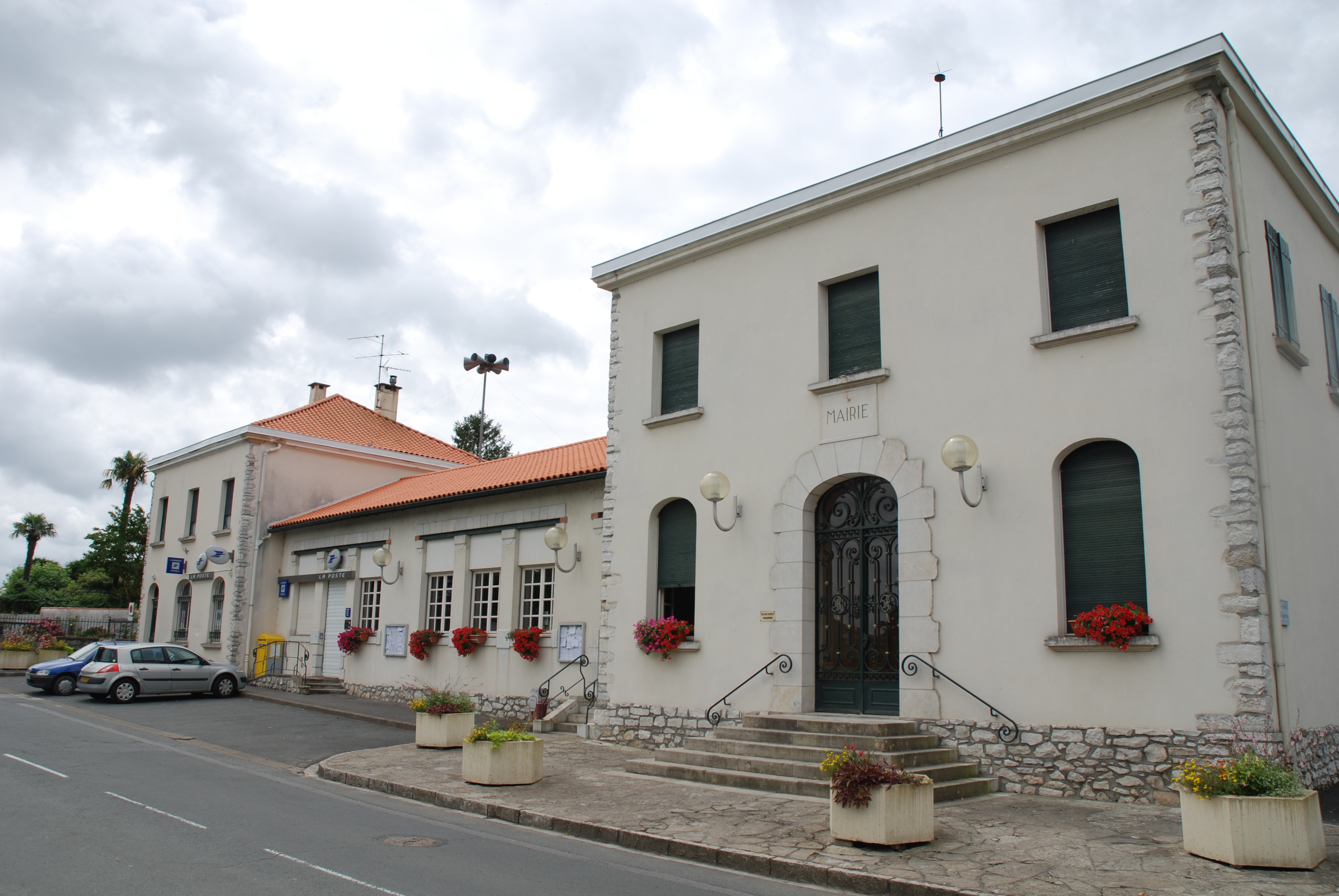
- Town hall

- Coat of arms
- Location of Urt
- Location within France Location within Nouvelle-Aquitaine
- Coordinates: 43°29′41″N 1°17′21″W
- Country: France
- Region: Nouvelle-Aquitaine
- Department: Pyrénées-Atlantiques
- Arrondissement: Bayonne
- Canton: Nive-Adour
- Intercommunality: CA Pays Basque

Government
  - Mayor (2020–2026): Nathalie Martial Etchegorry
- Area^{1}: 18.99 km^{2} (7.33 sq mi)
- Elevation: 40 m (130 ft)
- Highest elevation: 111 m (364 ft)
- Lowest elevation: 0 m (0 ft)
- Population (2023): 2,346
  - Density: 123.5/km^{2} (320.0/sq mi)
- Time zone: UTC+01:00 (CET)
  - Summer (DST): UTC+02:00 (CEST)
- INSEE/Postal code: 64546 /64240
- ^{1} French Land Register data, which excludes lakes, ponds, glaciers > 1 km^{2} (0.386 sq mi or 247 acres) and river estuaries.

Urt (French pronunciation: [yʁt]; Occitan: Urt; Basque: Ahurti) is a village and a commune in the Pyrénées-Atlantiques department in south-western France. It is part of the traditional province of Labourd.

Urt is the location of the Benedictine Belloc Abbey for monks and of St. Scholastica's Abbey for nuns. Urt station has rail connections to Tarbes, Pau and Bayonne.

The village is 15 km east of Bayonne.

== Population ==
Historical population
| Year | Pop. | ±% p.a. |
|---|---|---|
| 1968 | 1,047 | — |
| 1975 | 1,055 | +0.11% |
| 1982 | 1,120 | +0.86% |
| 1990 | 1,583 | +4.42% |
| 1999 | 1,702 | +0.81% |
| 2007 | 2,028 | +2.21% |
| 2012 | 2,220 | +1.83% |
| 2017 | 2,301 | +0.72% |
| 2023 | 2,346 | +0.32% |
Source: INSEE

== See also ==
- Communes of the Pyrénées-Atlantiques department
