= Guiche, Pyrénées-Atlantiques =

Guiche Gixune / Guishe
- Commune
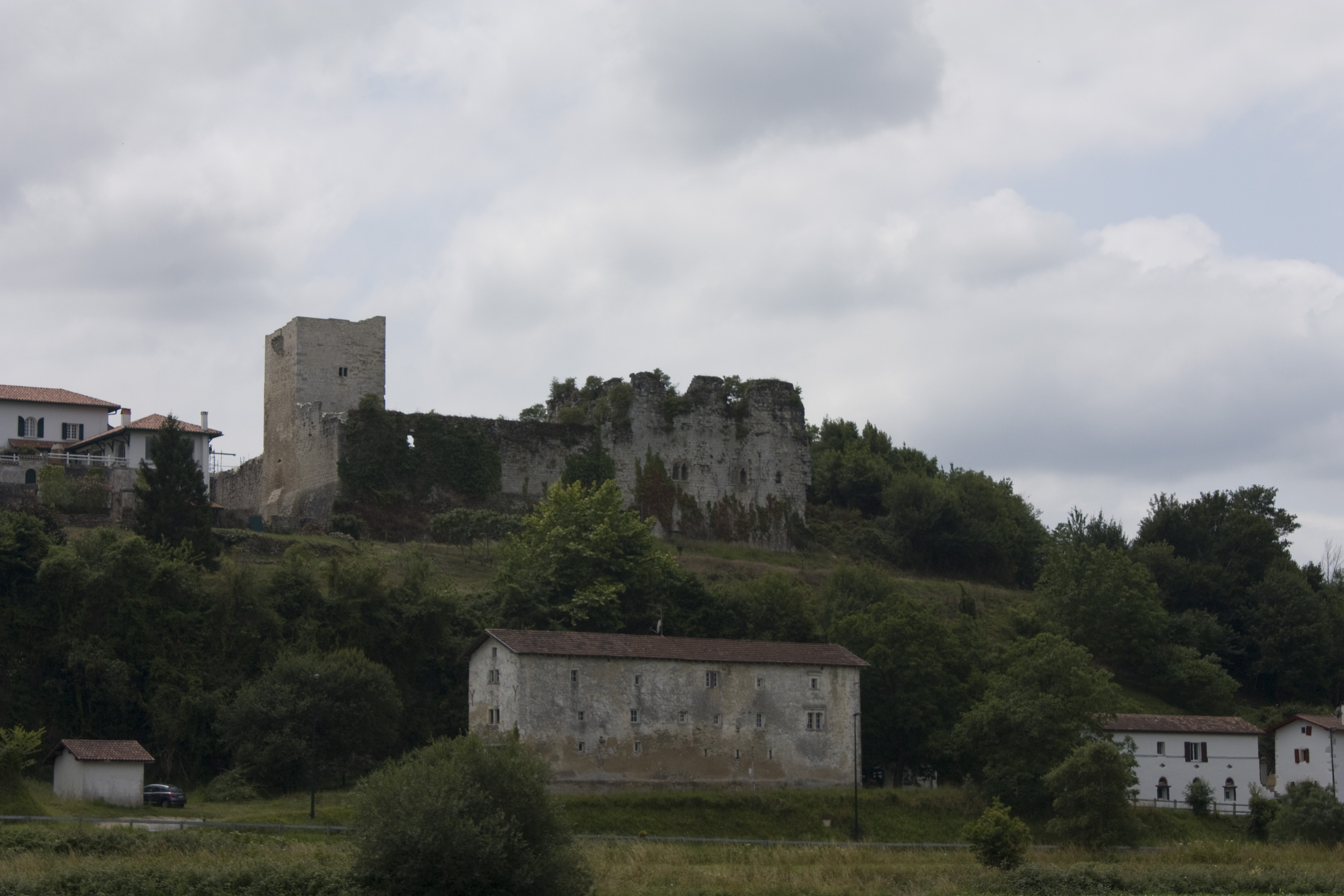
- The chateau of Guiche, seat of the Dukes of Gramont

- Coat of arms
- Location of Guiche
- Location within France Location within Nouvelle-Aquitaine
- Coordinates: 43°30′46″N 1°12′10″W
- Country: France
- Region: Nouvelle-Aquitaine
- Department: Pyrénées-Atlantiques
- Arrondissement: Bayonne
- Canton: Nive-Adour
- Intercommunality: CA Pays Basque

Government
  - Mayor (2020–2026): Jean-Yves Bussiron
- Area^{1}: 24.84 km^{2} (9.59 sq mi)
- Elevation: 89 m (292 ft)
- Highest elevation: 177 m (581 ft)
- Lowest elevation: 0 m (0 ft)
- Population (2023): 1,075
  - Density: 43.28/km^{2} (112.1/sq mi)
- Time zone: UTC+01:00 (CET)
  - Summer (DST): UTC+02:00 (CEST)
- INSEE/Postal code: 64250 /64520
- ^{1} French Land Register data, which excludes lakes, ponds, glaciers > 1 km^{2} (0.386 sq mi or 247 acres) and river estuaries.

Guiche (French pronunciation: [ɡiʃ]; Basque: Gixune; Occitan: Guishe) is a commune in the Pyrénées-Atlantiques department in south-western France.

== Popular culture ==
The play Cyrano de Bergerac by Edmond Rostand features a character known as the Count de Guiche who depicts Antoine III de Gramont, a real-life French marshal from Guiche.

== See also ==
- Communes of the Pyrénées-Atlantiques department
