= Bidouze =

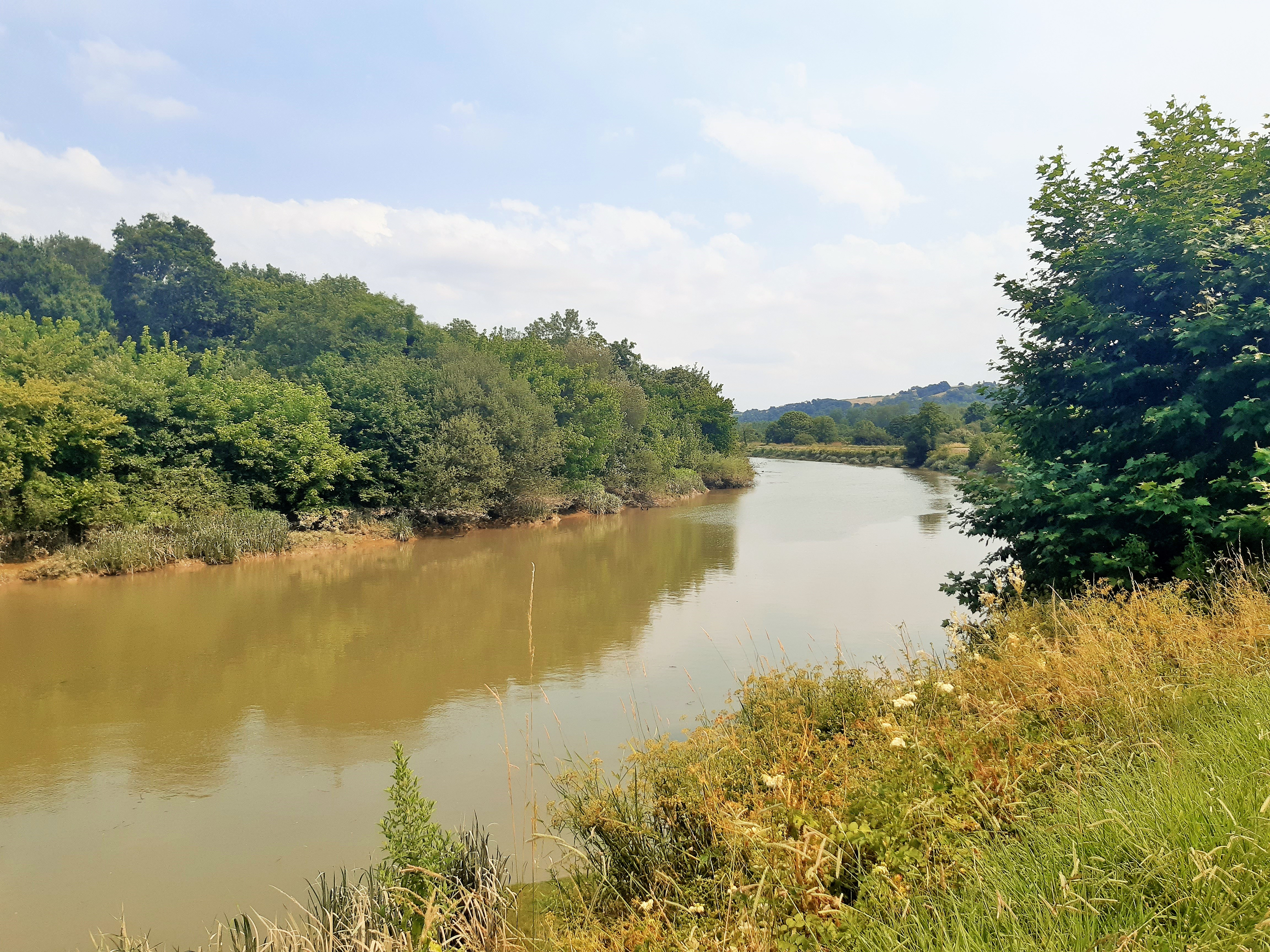

- Location within France Location within Nouvelle-Aquitaine

Location
- Country: France

Physical characteristics
- Source
  - location: Arbailles
- Mouth
  - location: Adour
  - coordinates: 43°31′52″N 1°12′48″W
- Length: 82 km (51 mi)

Basin features
- Progression: Adour→ Atlantic Ocean

The Bidouze (French pronunciation: [biduz]; Basque: Biduze) is a left tributary of the Adour, in the French Basque Country (Pyrénées-Atlantiques), in the Southwest of France. It is 82.2 km (51.1 mi) long.

== Geography ==
The Bidouze rises at the base of Eltzarreko Ordokia in the Arbailles massif. It drains the east of the Lower Navarre, crossing Saint-Palais (the main town). Then it flows into the Adour in Guiche. Bidouze is one of the reference rivers of minor water volume meandering across the Northern Basque territory along with the Nive and Saison.

== Name ==
The name of the Bidouze can be compared with other Aquitanian placenames as Vidouze (in the northeast of the Hautes-Pyrénées), Bedous or Bidos (both in the Aspe Valley)...

== Départements and towns ==
- Pyrénées-Atlantiques: Larceveau, Saint-Palais, Came, Bidache, Guiche.

== Main tributaries ==
- (L) Hoztako ur handia, from Hosta
- (L) Laminosina, from Ibarrolle
- (L) Artikaiteko erreka, from Utziate
- (R) Babatzeko erreka, from Juxue
- (R) Izpatxuriko erreka, union of Pagolako uhaitza and Lambarreko erreka
- (L) Joyeuse, from Iholdy
- (R) Azkabi, from Lohitzun
- (R) Ehulondo, from Berraute
- (L) Mihurrieta, from Béguios
- (R) Lauhirasse, from Sussaute
- (L) Ihiburu > Lihoury, union of 3 small rivers: Aphatarena (Patarena), La Harane and Arbelua > Arbéroue.
