= Arbérats-Sillègue =

Arbérats-Sillègue Arberatze-Zilhekoa
- Commune
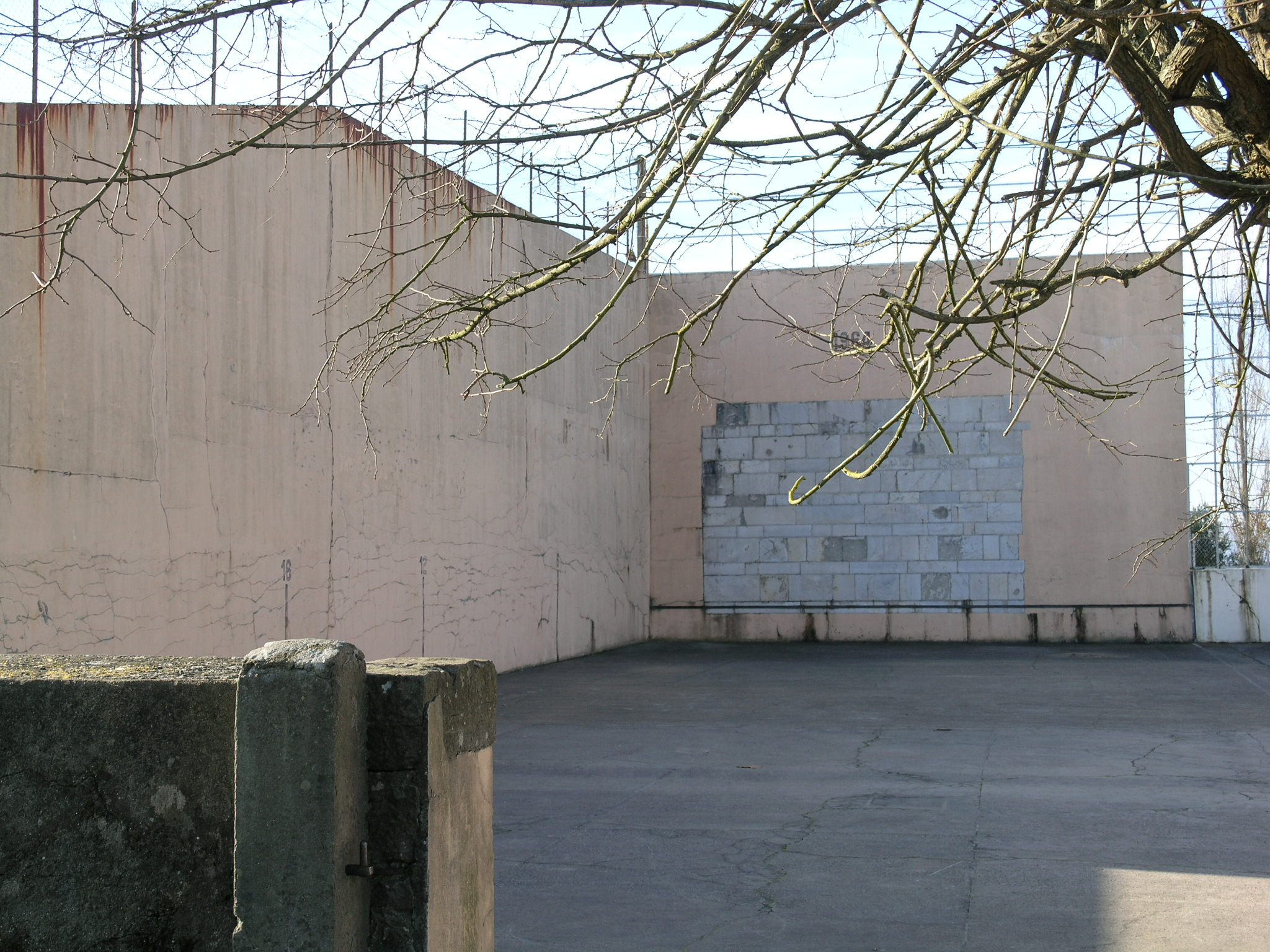
- The Fronton at Arbérats

- Coat of arms
- Location of Arbérats-Sillègue
- Location within France Location within Nouvelle-Aquitaine
- Coordinates: 43°20′33″N 0°59′41″W
- Country: France
- Region: Nouvelle-Aquitaine
- Department: Pyrénées-Atlantiques
- Arrondissement: Bayonne
- Canton: Pays de Bidache, Amikuze et Ostibarre
- Intercommunality: CA Pays Basque

Government
  - Mayor (2020–2026): Sauveur Bacho
- Area^{1}: 5.29 km^{2} (2.04 sq mi)
- Elevation: 126 m (413 ft)
- Highest elevation: 153 m (502 ft)
- Lowest elevation: 60 m (200 ft)
- Population (2023): 329
  - Density: 62.2/km^{2} (161/sq mi)
- Time zone: UTC+01:00 (CET)
  - Summer (DST): UTC+02:00 (CEST)
- INSEE/Postal code: 64034 /64120
- ^{1} French Land Register data, which excludes lakes, ponds, glaciers > 1 km^{2} (0.386 sq mi or 247 acres) and river estuaries.

Arbérats-Sillègue (French pronunciation: [aʁbeʁats silɛɡ]; Basque: Arberatze-Zilhekoa; Occitan: Arberates) is a commune in the Pyrénées-Atlantiques department in the Nouvelle-Aquitaine region of southwestern France.

The inhabitants of the commune are known as Arberaztar in Basque.

== Geography ==
Arbérats-Sillègue is located in Mixe Country in the former Basque province of Lower Navarre, 3 km north-east of Saint-Palais and 10 km south-west of Sauveterre-de-Béarn. The D933 road from Saint-Palais to Osserain-Rivareyte in the north passes through the northern part of the commune. The D134 road passes through the east of the commune from Sussaute in the north continuing south to join the D11 road west of Domezain-Berraute. Access to the village is by country road from the western border passing through the village and going east to join the D134.

The commune is located in the Drainage basin of the Adour. The Ruisseau de Recaide forms part of the northern border flowing north-west to join the Bidouze. The Ruisseau d'Eyherachar rises north-east of the village and flows west through the commune then south forming part of the western border before joining the Bidouze just south of Aïcirits (Aïcirits-Camou-Suhast).

=== Historical places and hamlets ===
- Aguerre
- Aitciria
- Amandania
- Apezetchia
- Arbérats
- Beheitia
- Bentaberria
- Bidegorria
- Bilhagnia
- Bitenia
- Brigni
- Chibits
- Chiloa
- Chunta
- Elhorriburia
- Etcheparia
- Idiartia
- Iratzia
- Irunia
- Jemai
- Mendiburia
- Michicourt
- Mignaburia
- Osquilia
- Oxarrainia
- Oxarrainia Etchartia
- Oyhanto
- Peritcho
- Salanbeheria
- Sillègue

== Toponymy ==
The name of the commune in basque is Arberatze-Zilhekoa. Paul Raymond indicated on page 161 of his 1863 dictionary that Sillègue in Basque was Silhecoa.

Jean-Baptiste Orpustan suggested two possible origins of the name Arbérats, both from Basque: ar(r)-bera (or beratz) meaning ’fragile’ or ’friable'; or, together with the word arbel, meaning a "black stone" (slate). Brigitte Jobbé-Duval also interpreted Arbérats as place of slate.

For Sillègue Jean-Batiste Orpustan suggested the name was a blend of the Basque word zil(h)o, meaning "hole" or "depression in the terrain" and a second element leku meaning "place".

The following table details the origins of the commune name and other names in the commune.

Name	Spelling	Date	Source	Page	Origin	Description
Arbérats	Arberas	1125	Orpustan			Village
	Arberatz	1150	Orpustan			
	Sanctus Laurebtius de Arberaz	1160	Orpustan			
	Arberas	13th century	Raymond	8	Duchesne	
	Arberaz	1350	Orpustan			
	Arberatz	1413	Orpustan			
	Arberatz	1487	Raymond	8	Ohix	
	Arberaz	1513	Raymond	8	Pamplona	
	Arbezats	1793	Cassini1			
	Arbezats	1801	Cassini1		Bulletin des lois	
Sillègue	Sanctus Petrus de Silegue	1160	Orpustan			Village
	Sileugue	1316	Orpustan			
	Silegoe	1350	Orpustan			
	Silleugue	1413	Orpustan			
	Silegoe	1472	Raymond	161	Notaries	
	Silegoa	1513	Raymond	161	Pamplona	
	Sillègue-les-Domezain	1734	Raymond	161	Regulations	
	Sillegue	1793	Cassini2		Bulletin des lois	
Aitciria	Ayciri de Arberatz	1487	Raymond	4	Ohix	Farm
	Aïtciry	1863	Raymond	4		
Charritte	Charritte	1863	Raymond	48		Fief, vassal of the Kingdom of Navarre

Sources:

- Orpustan: Jean-Baptiste Orpustan, New Basque Toponymy
- Raymond: Topographic Dictionary of the Department of Basses-Pyrenees, 1863, on the page numbers indicated in the table. (in French)
- Cassini1: Des villages de Cassini aux communes d'aujourd'hui: Commune data sheet Arbérats-Sillègue, EHESS (in French).
- Cassini2: Des villages de Cassini aux communes d'aujourd'hui: Commune data sheet Sillègue, EHESS (in French).

Origins:

- Duchesne: Duchesne collection volume CXIV
- Ohix:
- Pamplona: Titles of Pamplona
- Notaries: Notaries of Labastide-Villefranche
- Regulations: Regulations of the Court of Licharre

== History ==
The village of Sillègue was merged with Arbérats on 14 April 1841.

=== Heraldry ===
Arms of Arbérats-Sillègue	Blazon: Gules, ten escallops Argent arranged in pale 3, 4, and 3.

== Administration ==
List of Successive Mayors

From	To	Name
1995	2001	Jacques Sallenave
2001	2026	Sauveur Arnaud Bacho

=== Inter-communality ===
The commune belongs to five inter-communal structures:

- the Communauté d'agglomération du Pays Basque;
- the energy syndicate of Pyrénées-Atlantiques;
- the Inter-communal association for the functioning of schools in Amikuze;
- the Syndicat Elgarrekin Ikas;
- the Agence publique de gestion locale.

== Demography ==
In 1350 there were 13 fires in Arbérats and 6 in Sillègue.

The fiscal census of 1412–1413, made on the orders of Charles III of Navarre, compared with that of 1551 "of men and weapons that are in this Kingdom of Navarre below the ports" reveals a demography with strong growth. The first indicated the presence at Arbérats of 7 fires, the second of 26 (24 + 2 secondary fires). The same for Sillègue: the 1412 census reported 5 fires and that of 1551 22 fires (20 + 2 secondary fires).

The census of the population of Lower Navarre in 1695 showed 40 fires at Arbérats and 20 at Sillègues.

Although from 1793 to 1836 Arbérats and Sillègue were separate communes, the total population for both communes is shown in the table and graph below.

Historical population

Year	Pop.	±% p.a.
1793	293	—
1821	312	+0.22%
1846	314	+0.03%
1872	262	−0.69%
1901	242	−0.27%
1926	226	−0.27%
1946	235	+0.20%
1962	184	−1.52%
1968	175	−0.83%

Year	Pop.	±% p.a.
1975	177	+0.16%
1982	198	+1.61%
1990	222	+1.44%
1999	270	+2.20%
2007	322	+2.23%
2012	296	−1.67%
2017	257	−2.79%
2023	329	+4.20%

Source: EHESS and INSEE

== Economy ==
The commune is part of the Appellation d'origine contrôlée of Ossau-iraty.

== Culture and Heritage ==
According to the Map of the Seven Basque Provinces published in 1863 by Prince Louis-Lucien Bonaparte the Basque dialect spoken in Arbérats-Sillègue is western lower-navarrese.

=== Religious heritage ===
The Church of Saint-Laurent (1615) is registered as an historical monument.

== Facilities ==
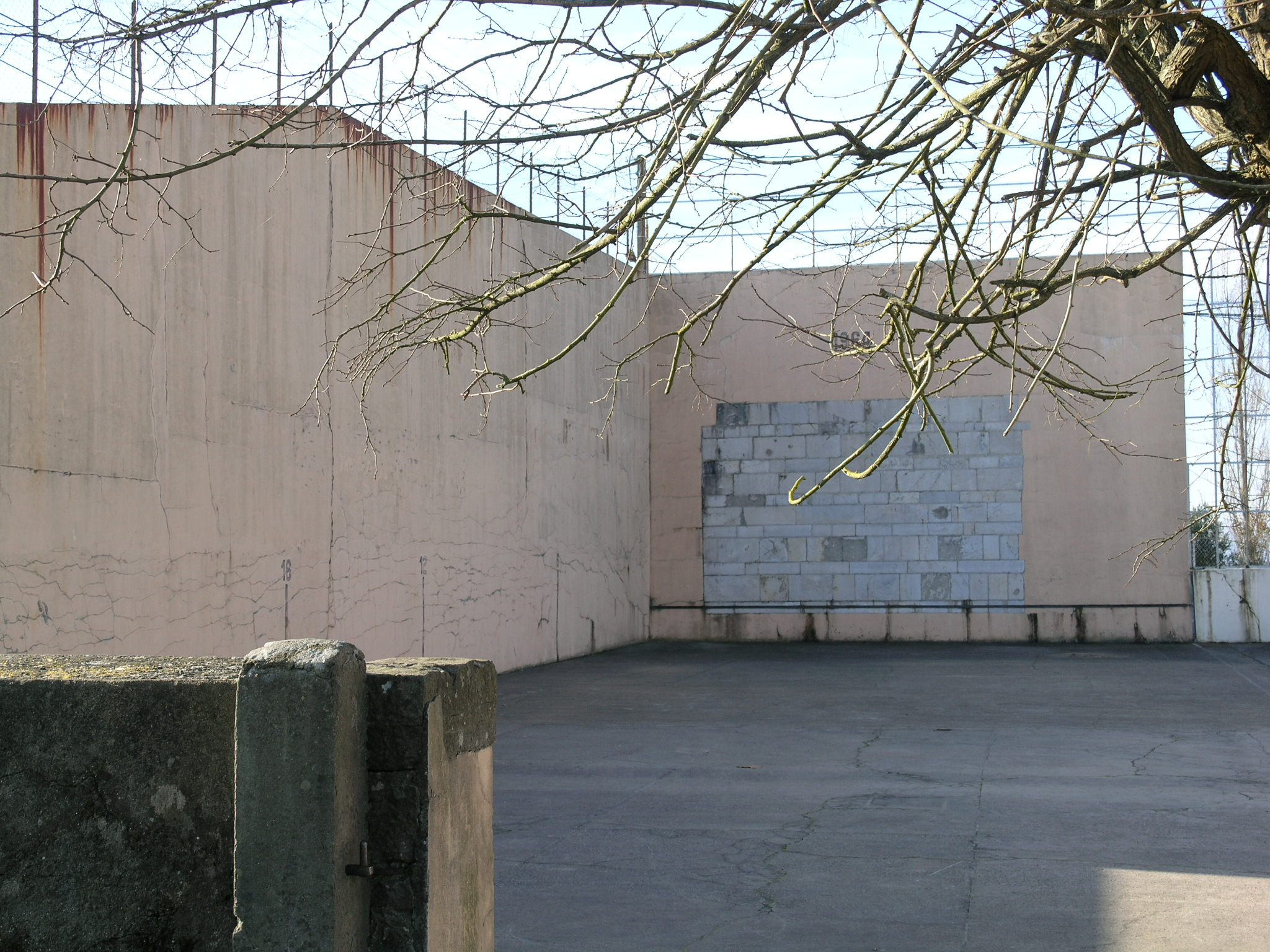
Fronton at Arbérats

=== Education ===
The commune has an elementary school

=== Festivals ===
The commune has a festival hall located in the centre of the village. The original building was a school and has been completely renovated.

=== Sports ===
As it was only equipped with a left wall, Arbérats-Sillègue in 2007 opened a new fronton with toilets and a Pétanque area. There is also a football field in the same complex.

=== Leisure ===
A pit dating to Roman times has been converted to a leisure park.

== See also ==
- Communes of the Pyrénées-Atlantiques department
