= Garris =

Garris may refer to:

- Garris, Pyrénées-Atlantiques, a commune in France
- Garris (surname)
- The Battle of Garris, fought in 1814 as part of the Peninsular War
- Garris, a character in The Children of the Marshland

== See also ==
- Garrix
