= Hosta (disambiguation) =

Hosta most commonly refers to:

- Hosta, a genus of about 23 to 45 species of plants

Hosta may also refer to:

== Places ==
- Hosta, Pyrénées-Atlantiques, France
- Hosta, Škofja Loka, Slovenia
