= Aïcirits-Camou-Suhast =

Aïcirits-Camou-Suhast Aiziritze-Gamue-Zohazti
- Commune
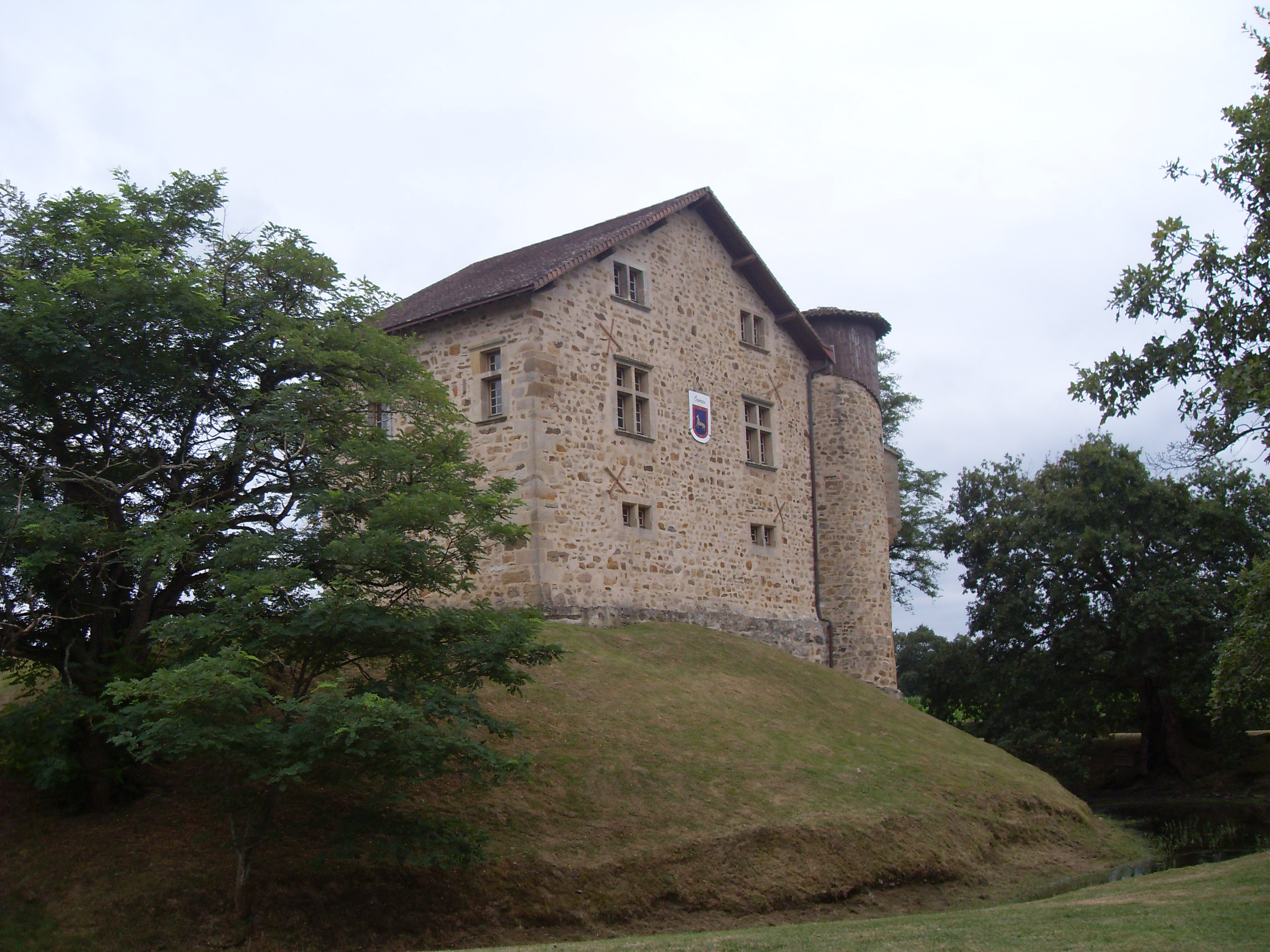
- Chateau of Camou

- Coat of arms
- Location of Aïcirits-Camou-Suhast
- Location within France Location within Nouvelle-Aquitaine
- Coordinates: 43°20′16″N 1°01′21″W
- Country: France
- Region: Nouvelle-Aquitaine
- Department: Pyrénées-Atlantiques
- Arrondissement: Bayonne
- Canton: Pays de Bidache, Amikuze et Ostibarre
- Intercommunality: Pays Basque

Government
  - Mayor (2020–2026): Chantal Erguy
- Area^{1}: 9.60 km^{2} (3.71 sq mi)
- Elevation: 83 m (272 ft)
- Highest elevation: 155 m (509 ft)
- Lowest elevation: 26 m (85 ft)
- Population (2023): 699
  - Density: 72.8/km^{2} (189/sq mi)
- Time zone: UTC+01:00 (CET)
  - Summer (DST): UTC+02:00 (CEST)
- INSEE/Postal code: 64010 /64120
- ^{1} French Land Register data, which excludes lakes, ponds, glaciers > 1 km^{2} (0.386 sq mi or 247 acres) and river estuaries.

Aïcirits-Camou-Suhast (French pronunciation: [a.isiʁits kamu sy.ast]; Occitan: Acíritis-Camu-Susast; Basque: Aiziritze-Gamue-Zohazti) is a commune in the Pyrénées-Atlantiques department in the Nouvelle-Aquitaine region in southwestern France.

The people of the commune are known as Aiziriztar.

== Geography ==
=== Location ===
The commune is part of the Mixe country in the French Basque Country of Lower Navarre. It is located immediately north of Saint-Palais. Highway D29 runs north from Saint-Palais through the entire commune from south to north and passing through the town. The D529 Highway runs east from the commune to its junction with Highway D134. Highway D933 enters the commune in the southeast and runs north along the eastern side of the commune to exit in the north.

=== Hydrography ===
The commune is located in the Drainage basin of the Adour and is watered by the Bidouze, a tributary of the Adour, and it has its tributaries: the Joyeuse and the Eyherachar and Recalde streams.

=== Places and Hamlets ===
- Aguerria
- Ahano
- Aïcirits
- Aiherguy
- Berhouet
- Blazy
- Bordaberry
- Camou
- Capou
- Changartia
- Chourry
- Christy (2 place names)
- Coutrenia
- Elgartemix
- Enauthardy
- Errecaldia
- Escutary
- Esquilamborda
- Etchart
- Etchebestia
- Etchecoin
- Etchegorria
- Eyhera
- Eyherabidia
- Goyhenetchia
- Halsague
- L'Hippodrome
- Hourcadette
- Ihitzague
- Ilhardoy
- Jauberria
- Larrabure
- Larramendy
- Larrania
- Larrartia
- Longynia
- Mandachainia
- Mendiburia
- Mocoroua
- Oyhenart
- Sagaspe
- Salha
- Salle
- Suhast
- Tocoua
- Tolospia
- Ttarga (craft zone)

=== Climate ===
Aïcirits-Camou-Suhast has an oceanic climate (Köppen climate classification Cfb). The average annual temperature in Aïcirits-Camou-Suhast is 14.1 °C (57.4 °F). The average annual rainfall is 1,216.7 mm (47.90 in) with November as the wettest month. The temperatures are highest on average in August, at around 21.2 °C (70.2 °F), and lowest in January, at around 7.5 °C (45.5 °F). The highest temperature ever recorded in Aïcirits-Camou-Suhast was 40.6 °C (105.1 °F) on 4 August 2003; the coldest temperature ever recorded was −10.1 °C (13.8 °F) on 25 December 2001.

Climate data for Aïcirits-Camou-Suhast (1981–2010 averages, extremes 1993−present)
| Month | Jan | Feb | Mar | Apr | May | Jun | Jul | Aug | Sep | Oct | Nov | Dec | Year |
|---|---|---|---|---|---|---|---|---|---|---|---|---|---|
| Record high °C (°F) | 25.1 (77.2) | 29.1 (84.4) | 29.2 (84.6) | 32.5 (90.5) | 35.8 (96.4) | 39.4 (102.9) | 39.8 (103.6) | 40.6 (105.1) | 38.1 (100.6) | 34.5 (94.1) | 28.3 (82.9) | 25.1 (77.2) | 40.6 (105.1) |
| Mean daily maximum °C (°F) | 12.4 (54.3) | 13.4 (56.1) | 16.6 (61.9) | 18.0 (64.4) | 21.7 (71.1) | 24.9 (76.8) | 26.3 (79.3) | 26.7 (80.1) | 24.1 (75.4) | 21.1 (70.0) | 15.2 (59.4) | 12.4 (54.3) | 19.4 (66.9) |
| Daily mean °C (°F) | 7.5 (45.5) | 8.0 (46.4) | 10.8 (51.4) | 12.4 (54.3) | 16.2 (61.2) | 19.4 (66.9) | 21.0 (69.8) | 21.2 (70.2) | 18.3 (64.9) | 15.6 (60.1) | 10.3 (50.5) | 7.8 (46.0) | 14.1 (57.4) |
| Mean daily minimum °C (°F) | 2.6 (36.7) | 3.0 (37.4) | 4.9 (40.8) | 6.9 (44.4) | 10.8 (51.4) | 14.0 (57.2) | 15.7 (60.3) | 15.7 (60.3) | 12.5 (54.5) | 10.1 (50.2) | 5.5 (41.9) | 3.2 (37.8) | 8.8 (47.8) |
| Record low °C (°F) | −7.5 (18.5) | −9.6 (14.7) | −9.0 (15.8) | −2.9 (26.8) | 0.6 (33.1) | 4.3 (39.7) | 8.2 (46.8) | 5.7 (42.3) | 2.5 (36.5) | −1.6 (29.1) | −6.6 (20.1) | −10.1 (13.8) | −10.1 (13.8) |
| Average precipitation mm (inches) | 110.1 (4.33) | 98.1 (3.86) | 90.6 (3.57) | 116.4 (4.58) | 101.2 (3.98) | 71.0 (2.80) | 66.4 (2.61) | 73.8 (2.91) | 103.0 (4.06) | 109.8 (4.32) | 161.3 (6.35) | 115.0 (4.53) | 1,216.7 (47.90) |
| Average precipitation days (≥ 1.0 mm) | 12.9 | 11.1 | 10.0 | 13.0 | 13.1 | 8.8 | 8.1 | 8.9 | 10.3 | 10.5 | 12.8 | 12.2 | 131.7 |
Source: Météo France

== Toponymy ==
The commune's name in Basque is Aiziritze-Gamue-Zohazti.

For Aïcirits, Jean-Baptiste Orpustan proposed the Basque etymology aitz, meaning "high" and aratze, meaning "fern patch", giving "high fern patch" or "rocky fern patch".

He also indicated that Suhast may come from zuhaztoi, meaning "plantation of trees".

The inhabitants of Camou are known as Gamuar and the inhabitants of Suhast are known as Zohaztiar.

The following table details the origins of the commune name and other names in the commune.

| Name | Spelling | Date | Source | Page | Origin | Description |
|---|---|---|---|---|---|---|
| Aïcirits | Sanctus Martinus de Assiriz | 1160 | Orpustan | | | Village |
| | Ayxiritz | 1316 | Orpustan | | | |
| | Aysiriz | 1350 | Orpustan | | | |
| | Aychiritz | 1413 | Orpustan | | | |
| | Ayxeriis | 1472 | Raymond | 3 | Notaries | |
| Camou | Sactus Petrus de Camono | 1160 | Orpustan | | | Village |
| | Camou-Mixe | 13th century | Raymond | 39 | Bayonne | |
| | Camo | 1304 | Orpustan | | | |
| | Chamo | 1309 | Orpustan | | | |
| | Gamo | 1350 | Orpustan | | | |
| | Camo | 1413 | Orpustan | | | |
| | Camur | 1472 | Raymond | 39 | Notaries | |
| | Camo en Micxe | 1479 | Raymond | 39 | Ohix | |
| | Camo | 1519 | Raymond | 39 | Navarre | |
| | Camu | 1621 | Raymond | 39 | Biscay | |
| | Camon | 1621 | Ldh/EHESS/Cassini | | Biscay | |
| | Camou-Mixe | 1863 | Raymond | 39 | | |
| Suhast | Sancta Maria de Suhast | 1160 | Orpustan | | | Village |
| | Suhast | 1316 | Orpustan | | | |
| | Suast | 1350 | Orpustan | | | |
| | Suhast | 1413 | Orpustan | | | |
| | Suast | 1513 | Raymond | 164 | Pamplona | |
| Salha | Çalaha | 1384 | Raymond | 153 | Duchesne | Chateau and Fief, subject to the Kingdom of Navarre |
| | La maison deu senhor de Salha en lo pays de Micxe | 1547 | Raymond | 164 | Navarre | |
| Uhart-Juson | Uhart-Juson | 1863 | Raymond | 170 | | Fief, vassal of the Kingdom of Navarre |

Sources:

- Orpustan: Jean-Baptiste Orpustan, New Basque Toponymy
- Raymond: Topographic Dictionary of the Department of Basses-Pyrenees, 1863, on the page numbers indicated in the table. (in French)

Origins:

- Notaries: Notaries of Labastide-Villefranche
- Bayonne: Cartulary of Bayonne or Livre d'Or (Book of Gold)
- Ohix:
- Navarre: Titles of the Kingdom of Navarre
- Biscay: Martin Biscay
- Pamplona: Titles of Pamplona

== History ==
The commune Aïcirits-Camou-Suhast was formed in 1972 by the merger of the former communes Aïcirits and Camou-Mixe-Suhast. Between 1972 and 1984, this commune was referred to as Aïcirits. The commune Camou-Mixe-Suhast was formed in 1842 by the merger of the communes Suhast and Camou-Mixe.

== Heraldry ==
| Arms of Aïcirits-Camou-Suhast | The arms are made up of the three shields of Aïcirits, Camou, and Suhast. Blazon: Argent, three inescutcheons posed 2 and 1. The first Azure with two keys of Or saltirewise to dexter an orb the same banded and crossed at chef argent charged with three crosses pattées of gules; the second of Azure a wolf passant in Or armed and langued in gules, bordure the same charged with eight crosses of St. Andrew of Or 2 at chief, 3 at dexter and 3 at sinister; the third Or with three oaks eradicated vert shaft Tenné |

== Administration ==
List of Successive Mayors of Aïcirits-Camou-Suhast

| From | To | Name | Party |
|---|---|---|---|
| 1995 | 2014 | Guy Énéco | CPNT |
| 2014 | 2026 | Chantal Erguy | CPNT |

=== Administrative Associations ===
The commune is linked to the following administrative bodies (non exhaustive list):

- the catchment area of Saint-Palais
- Local Agency for Employment (ALE) of Biarritz
- the social welfare fund of Bayonne
- the Chamber of Commerce and Industry of Bayonne Basque Country
- the sanitation sector of Bayonne Saint-Palais-South-West-Landes
- the subdivision of the Departmental Equipment management of Saint-Palais-Bidache

=== Judicial Districts ===
The town depends on the district court of Bayonne, the High Court of Bayonne and the Court of Appeal of Pau.

=== Inter-communality ===
The commune belongs to six inter-communal structures:

- the Communauté d'agglomération du Pays Basque
- the AEP union for the Mixe country
- the energy union of Pyrenees-Atlantiques;
- the intercommunal union for regrouping of teaching "Ikas bidea"
- the intercommunal union for the operation of the schools of Amikuze
- the union to support Basque culture.

== Population ==
Data before 1972 in the table and graph below refer to the old commune Aïcirits, before the merger with Camou-Mixe-Suhast.

Historical population

| Year | Pop. | ±% p.a. |
|---|---|---|
| 1793 | 206 | — |
| 1821 | 186 | −0.36% |
| 1846 | 256 | +1.29% |
| 1872 | 211 | −0.74% |
| 1901 | 249 | +0.57% |
| 1926 | 249 | +0.00% |
| 1946 | 202 | −1.04% |
| 1962 | 204 | +0.06% |
| 1968 | 219 | +1.19% |

| Year | Pop. | ±% p.a. |
|---|---|---|
| 1975 | 564 | +14.47% |
| 1982 | 531 | −0.86% |
| 1990 | 531 | +0.00% |
| 1999 | 559 | +0.57% |
| 2007 | 648 | +1.86% |
| 2012 | 656 | +0.25% |
| 2017 | 670 | +0.42% |
| 2023 | 699 | +0.71% |

Source: EHESS and INSEE

== Economy ==
Aïcirits-Camou-Suhast is classified by the INSEE as part of the urban area (unité urbaine) of Saint-Palais, and of the employment area of Oloron-Sainte-Marie.

The registered office of the Lur Berri company, a large food cooperative group, is located in Aïcirits-Camou-Suhast.

The town is part of the designated zone of Ossau-iraty.

It also hosts other companies in the agri-food sector as one of the first fifty two communes of the department:

- Union agricultural coop feed livestock (feed manufacturing for farm animals);
- Haraguy-Bayonne ham (industrial preparation of meat products);
- LBO (food production for farm animals);
- Lajournade SAS (industrial preparation of meat products).

== Culture and heritage ==
=== Languages ===
According to the Map of the Seven Basque Provinces published in 1863 by Prince Louis-Lucien Bonaparte, the dialect of Basque spoken in Aicirits-Camou-Suhast is eastern low Navarrese.

The village has a cave at Camou (the grotto Oltzibarre) closely linked to the Basque legend of Txahalgorri, the young red bull.

=== Civil heritage ===
- The former Chateau of Camou (17th century). It contains collections of ancient tools and models of machines from plans of Leonardo da Vinci.

=== Religious Heritage ===
- The Church of Saint Martin(1841).

== Notable People linked to the commune ==
- Martin Landerretche, born on 26 July 1842 at Bussunarits-Sarrasquette and died on 29 January 1930 at Espelette was a bascologue, a priest, writer and a Basque French academic in the Basque language. He was the pastor at Aïcirits.

== See also ==
- Communes of the Pyrénées-Atlantiques department
