= Lohizun =

Lohizun or Lohitzun may refer to

- Lohitzun-Oyhercq, a commune of Pyrénées-Atlantiques
- Donibane-Lohitzune, Basque name of Saint-Jean-de-Luz
