= Béhasque-Lapiste =

Béhasque-Lapiste Behaskane-Laphizketa
- Commune
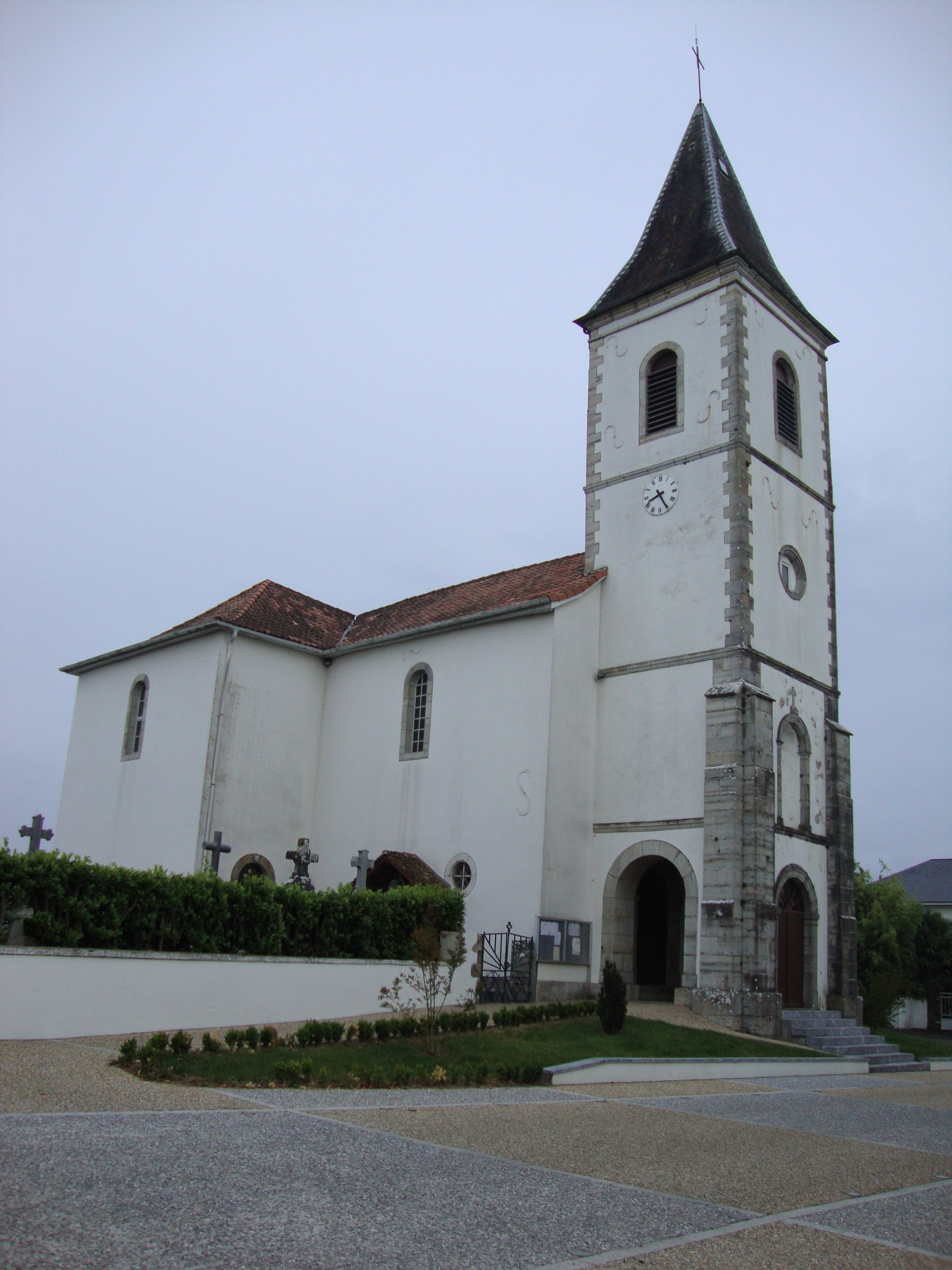
- The church of Béhasque
- Location of Béhasque-Lapiste
- Location within France Location within Nouvelle-Aquitaine
- Coordinates: 43°19′30″N 1°00′34″W
- Country: France
- Region: Nouvelle-Aquitaine
- Department: Pyrénées-Atlantiques
- Arrondissement: Bayonne
- Canton: Pays de Bidache, Amikuze et Ostibarre
- Intercommunality: CA Pays Basque

Government
  - Mayor (2020–2026): Gabriel Belleau
- Area^{1}: 5.64 km^{2} (2.18 sq mi)
- Elevation: 98 m (322 ft)
- Highest elevation: 255 m (837 ft)
- Lowest elevation: 44 m (144 ft)
- Population (2023): 505
  - Density: 89.5/km^{2} (232/sq mi)
- Time zone: UTC+01:00 (CET)
  - Summer (DST): UTC+02:00 (CEST)
- INSEE/Postal code: 64106 /64120
- ^{1} French Land Register data, which excludes lakes, ponds, glaciers > 1 km^{2} (0.386 sq mi or 247 acres) and river estuaries.

Béhasque-Lapiste (French pronunciation: [beask lapist]; Occitan: Basc-Lo Lapin; Basque: Behaskane-Laphizketa) is a commune of the Pyrénées-Atlantiques department in southwestern France.

It is located in the former province of Lower Navarre.

== See also ==
- Communes of the Pyrénées-Atlantiques department
