= Saint-Martin-d'Arberoue =

Saint-Martin-d'Arberoue Donamartiri (Basque)
- Commune
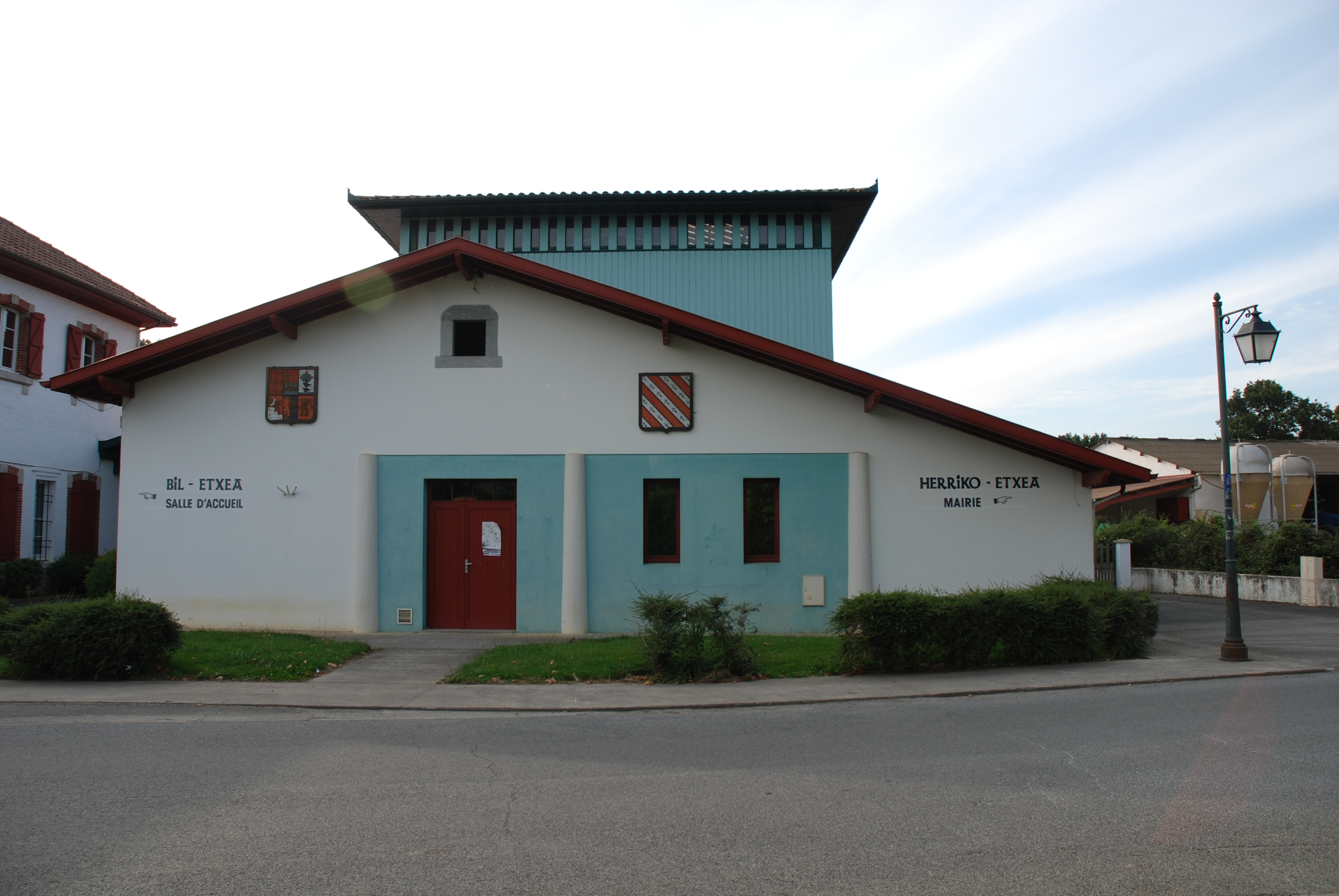
- Town hall

- Coat of arms
- Location of Saint-Martin-d'Arberoue
- Location within France Location within Nouvelle-Aquitaine
- Coordinates: 43°20′44″N 1°11′45″W
- Country: France
- Region: Nouvelle-Aquitaine
- Department: Pyrénées-Atlantiques
- Arrondissement: Bayonne
- Canton: Pays de Bidache, Amikuze et Ostibarre
- Intercommunality: CA Pays Basque

Government
  - Mayor (2020–2026): Antton Larraburu
- Area^{1}: 14.69 km^{2} (5.67 sq mi)
- Elevation: 121 m (397 ft)
- Highest elevation: 424 m (1,391 ft)
- Lowest elevation: 96 m (315 ft)
- Population (2023): 350
  - Density: 24/km^{2} (62/sq mi)
- Time zone: UTC+01:00 (CET)
  - Summer (DST): UTC+02:00 (CEST)
- INSEE/Postal code: 64489 /64640
- ^{1} French Land Register data, which excludes lakes, ponds, glaciers > 1 km^{2} (0.386 sq mi or 247 acres) and river estuaries.

Saint-Martin-d'Arberoue (French pronunciation: [sɛ̃ maʁtɛ̃ daʁbeʁu]; also Saint-Martin-d'Arbéroue; Occitan: Sent Martin d'Arberua; Basque: Donamartiri) is a commune in the Pyrénées-Atlantiques department in south-western France.

It is located in the former province of Lower Navarre.

== See also ==
- Communes of the Pyrénées-Atlantiques department
