= Suhescun =

Suhescun Suhuskune (Basque)
- Commune
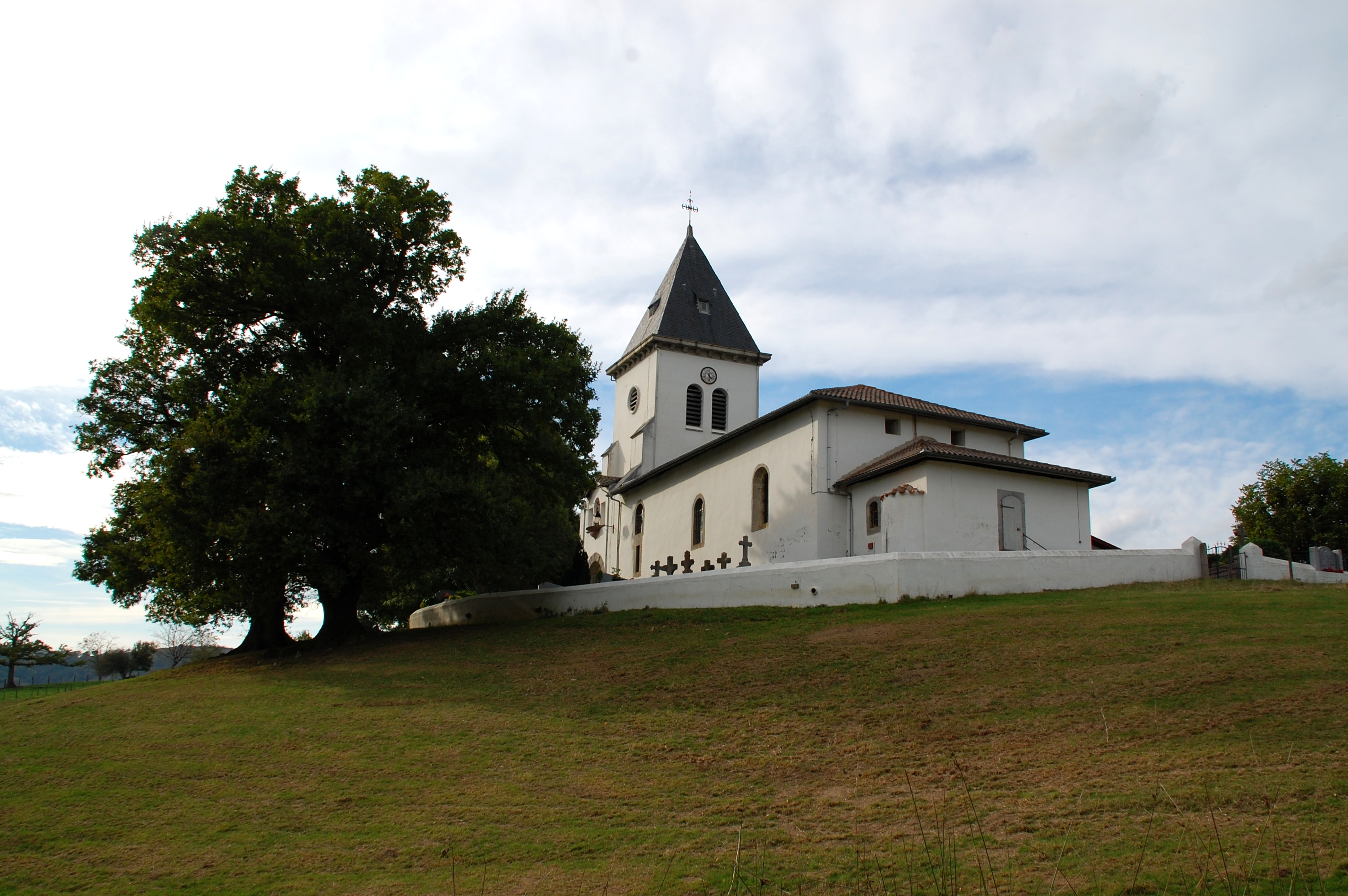
- The church of Suhescun
- Location of Suhescun
- Location within France Location within Nouvelle-Aquitaine
- Coordinates: 43°14′08″N 1°11′49″W
- Country: France
- Region: Nouvelle-Aquitaine
- Department: Pyrénées-Atlantiques
- Arrondissement: Bayonne
- Canton: Pays de Bidache, Amikuze et Ostibarre
- Intercommunality: CA Pays Basque

Government
  - Mayor (2020–2026): René Etchemendy
- Area^{1}: 11.83 km^{2} (4.57 sq mi)
- Elevation: 230 m (750 ft)
- Highest elevation: 549 m (1,801 ft)
- Lowest elevation: 186 m (610 ft)
- Population (2023): 165
  - Density: 13.9/km^{2} (36.1/sq mi)
- Time zone: UTC+01:00 (CET)
  - Summer (DST): UTC+02:00 (CEST)
- INSEE/Postal code: 64528 /64780
- ^{1} French Land Register data, which excludes lakes, ponds, glaciers > 1 km^{2} (0.386 sq mi or 247 acres) and river estuaries.

Suhescun (French pronunciation: [sy.ɛskœ̃]; Basque: Suhuskune) is a commune in the Pyrénées-Atlantiques department in south-western France.

== See also ==
- Communes of the Pyrénées-Atlantiques department
