= Gabat, Pyrénées-Atlantiques =

Gabat Gabadi
- Commune
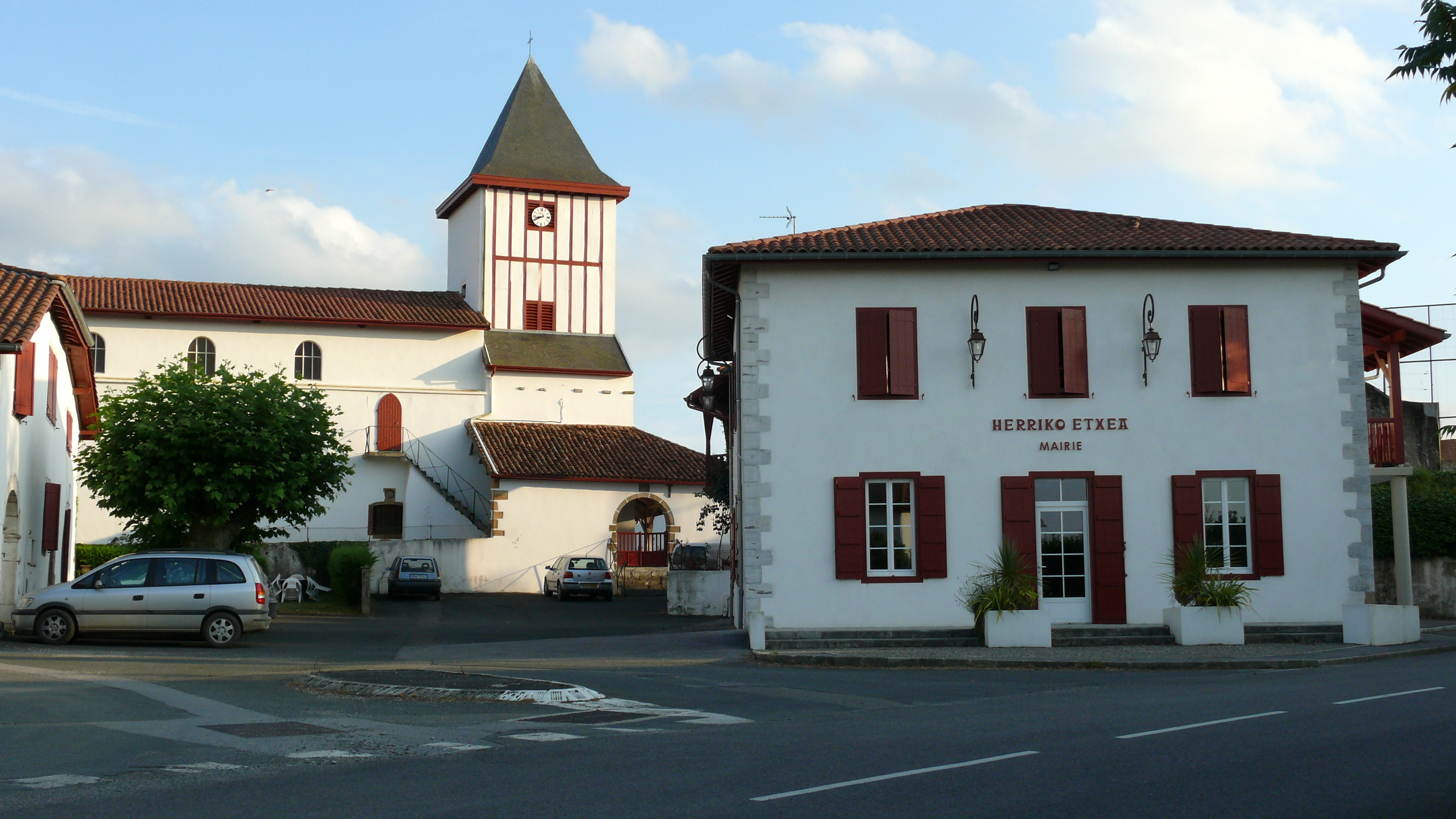

- Coat of arms
- Location of Gabat
- Location within France Location within Nouvelle-Aquitaine
- Coordinates: 43°22′19″N 1°01′59″W
- Country: France
- Region: Nouvelle-Aquitaine
- Department: Pyrénées-Atlantiques
- Arrondissement: Bayonne
- Canton: Pays de Bidache, Amikuze et Ostibarre
- Intercommunality: Pays Basque

Government
  - Mayor (2020–2026): Jean-Louis Prebende
- Area^{1}: 8.31 km^{2} (3.21 sq mi)
- Elevation: 43 m (141 ft)
- Highest elevation: 156 m (512 ft)
- Lowest elevation: 23 m (75 ft)
- Population (2023): 274
  - Density: 33.0/km^{2} (85.4/sq mi)
- Time zone: UTC+01:00 (CET)
  - Summer (DST): UTC+02:00 (CEST)
- INSEE/Postal code: 64228 /64120
- ^{1} French Land Register data, which excludes lakes, ponds, glaciers > 1 km^{2} (0.386 sq mi or 247 acres) and river estuaries.

Gabat (Occitan: Cabàs; Basque: Gabadi) is a commune in the Pyrénées-Atlantiques department in south-western France.

It is located in the former province of Lower Navarre, in the Pyrenees. The local dialect is western bas-navarrais. Inhabitants are called Gabardiars.

== Names ==
Historically attested name (form)s are Gabat (1125), Sancta Maria de Bagad / Bagadh (1160), Gavat (12th century cartulary of Sorde), Bagat (1203), Gavat (1268), Gabat (1316 & 1413) and Nostre-Done de Gabat (1472, notaries of Labastide-Villefranche).

== Population ==
Historical population
Year	Pop.	±% p.a.
1968	202	—
1975	199	−0.21%
1982	224	+1.70%
1990	229	+0.28%
1999	215	−0.70%
2007	206	−0.53%
2012	224	+1.69%
2017	256	+2.71%
2023	274	+1.14%
Source: INSEE

== See also ==
- Communes of the Pyrénées-Atlantiques department
