= Irissarry =

Irissarry Irisarri
- Commune
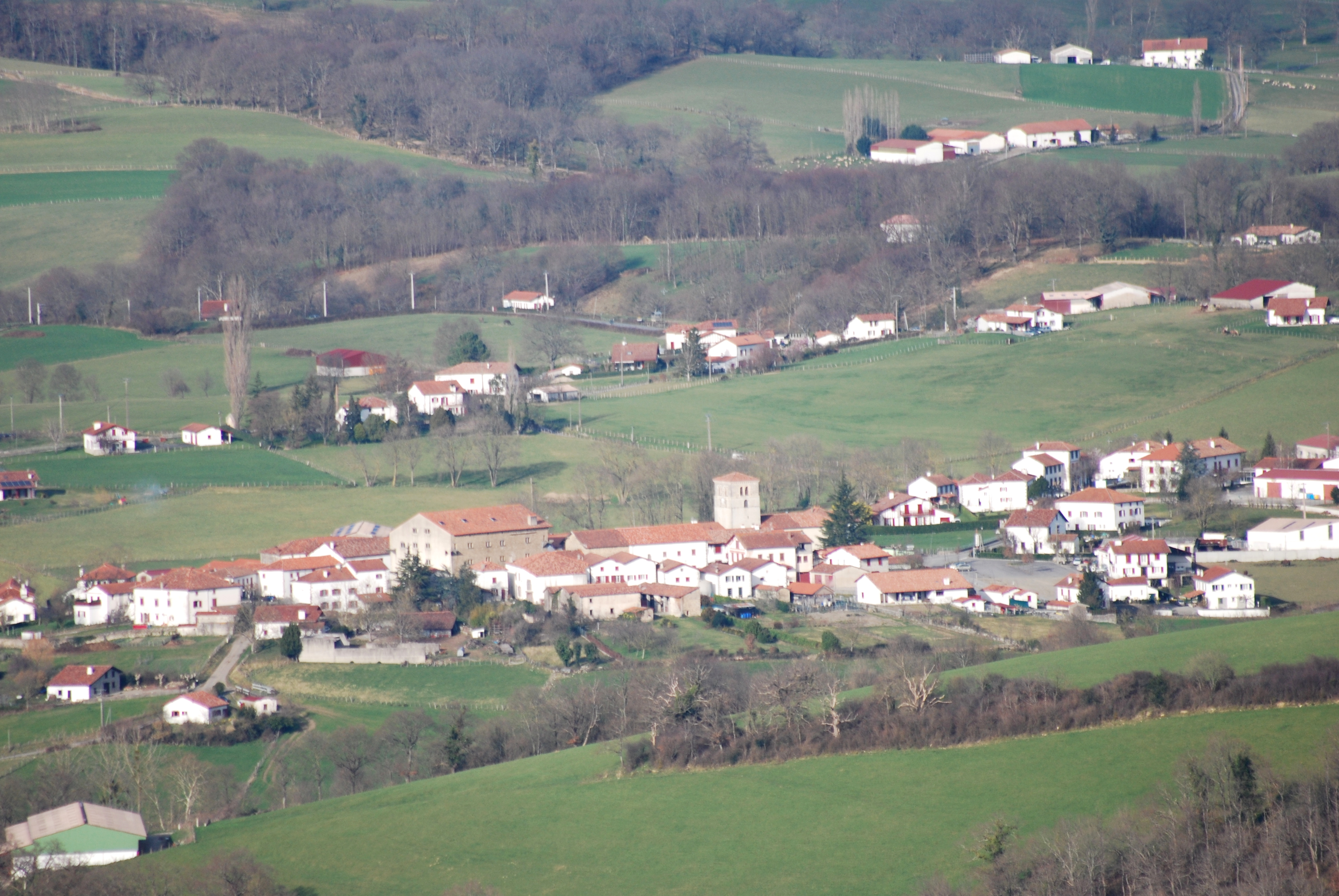
- A general view of Irissarry

- Coat of arms
- Location of Irissarry
- Location within France Location within Nouvelle-Aquitaine
- Coordinates: 43°15′29″N 1°13′57″W
- Country: France
- Region: Nouvelle-Aquitaine
- Department: Pyrénées-Atlantiques
- Arrondissement: Bayonne
- Canton: Pays de Bidache, Amikuze et Ostibarre
- Intercommunality: CA Pays Basque

Government
  - Mayor (2020–2026): Xavier Lacoste
- Area^{1}: 26.39 km^{2} (10.19 sq mi)
- Elevation: 225 m (738 ft)
- Highest elevation: 839 m (2,753 ft)
- Lowest elevation: 149 m (489 ft)
- Population (2023): 870
  - Density: 33/km^{2} (85/sq mi)
- Time zone: UTC+01:00 (CET)
  - Summer (DST): UTC+02:00 (CEST)
- INSEE/Postal code: 64273 /64780
- ^{1} French Land Register data, which excludes lakes, ponds, glaciers > 1 km^{2} (0.386 sq mi or 247 acres) and river estuaries.

Irissarry (French pronunciation: [iʁisaʁi]; Basque: Irisarri) is a commune in the Pyrénées-Atlantiques department and Nouvelle-Aquitaine region of south-western France.

It is located in the former province of Lower Navarre.

== See also ==
- Communes of the Pyrénées-Atlantiques department
