= Saint-Esteben =

Saint-Esteben Donoztiri (Basque)
- Commune
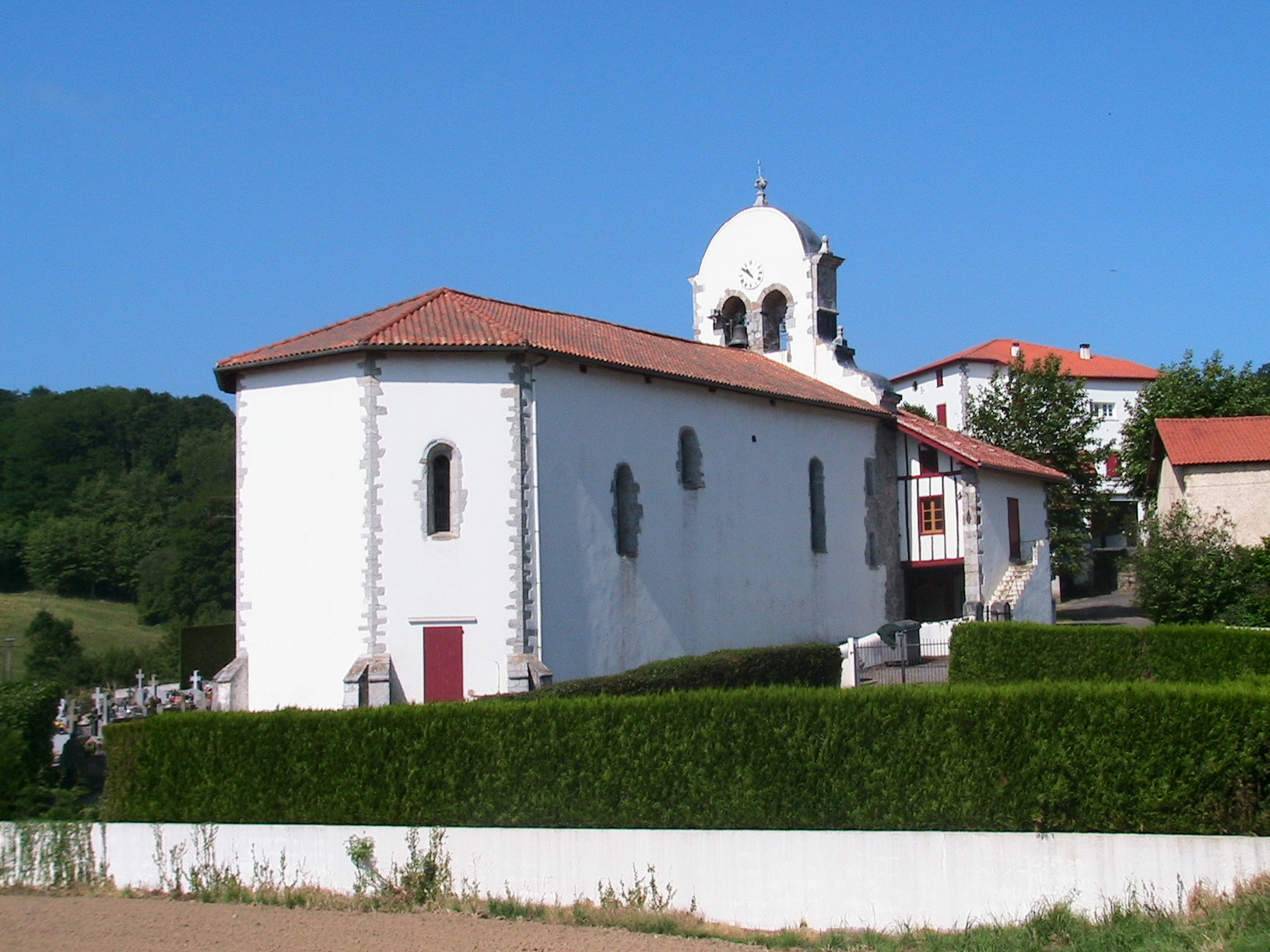
- The church of Saint-Esteben

- Coat of arms
- Location of Saint-Esteben
- Location within France Location within Nouvelle-Aquitaine
- Coordinates: 43°20′22″N 1°12′27″W
- Country: France
- Region: Nouvelle-Aquitaine
- Department: Pyrénées-Atlantiques
- Arrondissement: Bayonne
- Canton: Pays de Bidache, Amikuze et Ostibarre
- Intercommunality: CA Pays Basque

Government
  - Mayor (2020–2026): Régine Larranda
- Area^{1}: 13.71 km^{2} (5.29 sq mi)
- Elevation: 140 m (460 ft)
- Highest elevation: 465 m (1,526 ft)
- Lowest elevation: 118 m (387 ft)
- Population (2023): 442
  - Density: 32.2/km^{2} (83.5/sq mi)
- Time zone: UTC+01:00 (CET)
  - Summer (DST): UTC+02:00 (CEST)
- INSEE/Postal code: 64476 /64640
- ^{1} French Land Register data, which excludes lakes, ponds, glaciers > 1 km^{2} (0.386 sq mi or 247 acres) and river estuaries.

Saint-Esteben (Occitan: Sant Estève; Basque: Donoztiri) is a commune in the Pyrénées-Atlantiques department in south-western France.

It is located in the former province of Lower Navarre.

== See also ==
- Communes of the Pyrénées-Atlantiques department
