= Bunus =

Bunus Bunuze
- Commune
- Location of Bunus
- Location within France Location within Nouvelle-Aquitaine
- Coordinates: 43°12′39″N 1°04′07″W
- Country: France
- Region: Nouvelle-Aquitaine
- Department: Pyrénées-Atlantiques
- Arrondissement: Bayonne
- Canton: Pays de Bidache, Amikuze et Ostibarre
- Intercommunality: CA Pays Basque

Government
  - Mayor (2020–2026): Èric Ithurralde
- Area^{1}: 6.60 km^{2} (2.55 sq mi)
- Elevation: 440 m (1,440 ft)
- Highest elevation: 531 m (1,742 ft)
- Lowest elevation: 138 m (453 ft)
- Population (2023): 133
  - Density: 20.2/km^{2} (52.2/sq mi)
- Time zone: UTC+01:00 (CET)
  - Summer (DST): UTC+02:00 (CEST)
- INSEE/Postal code: 64150 /64120
- ^{1} French Land Register data, which excludes lakes, ponds, glaciers > 1 km^{2} (0.386 sq mi or 247 acres) and river estuaries.

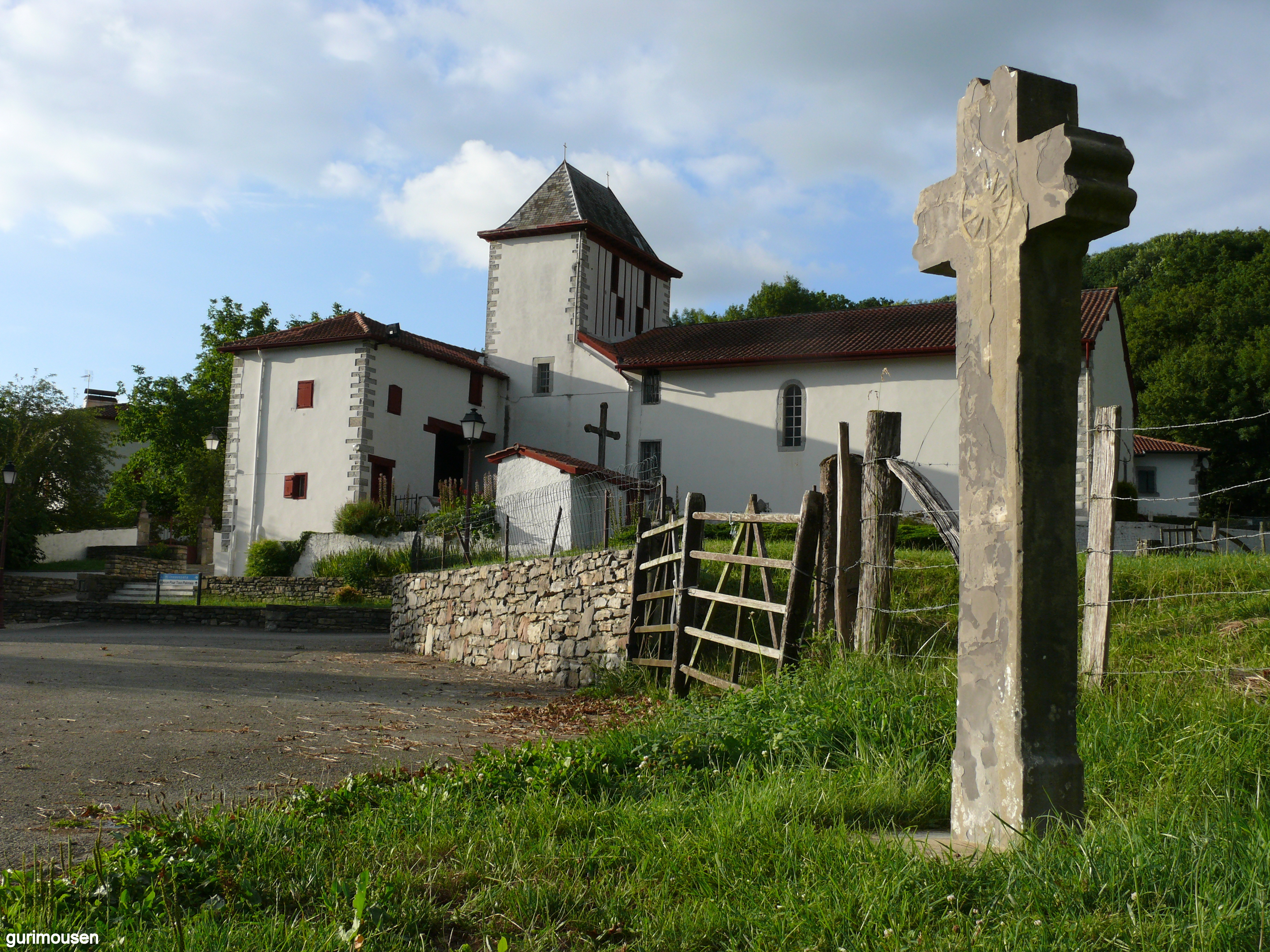
Bunuze (Nafarroa Beherea)

Bunus (Occitan: Bon; Basque: Bunuze) is a commune in the Pyrénées-Atlantiques department in southwestern France.

It is located in the former province of Lower Navarre.

== See also ==
- Communes of the Pyrénées-Atlantiques department
