= Ilharre =

- Commune
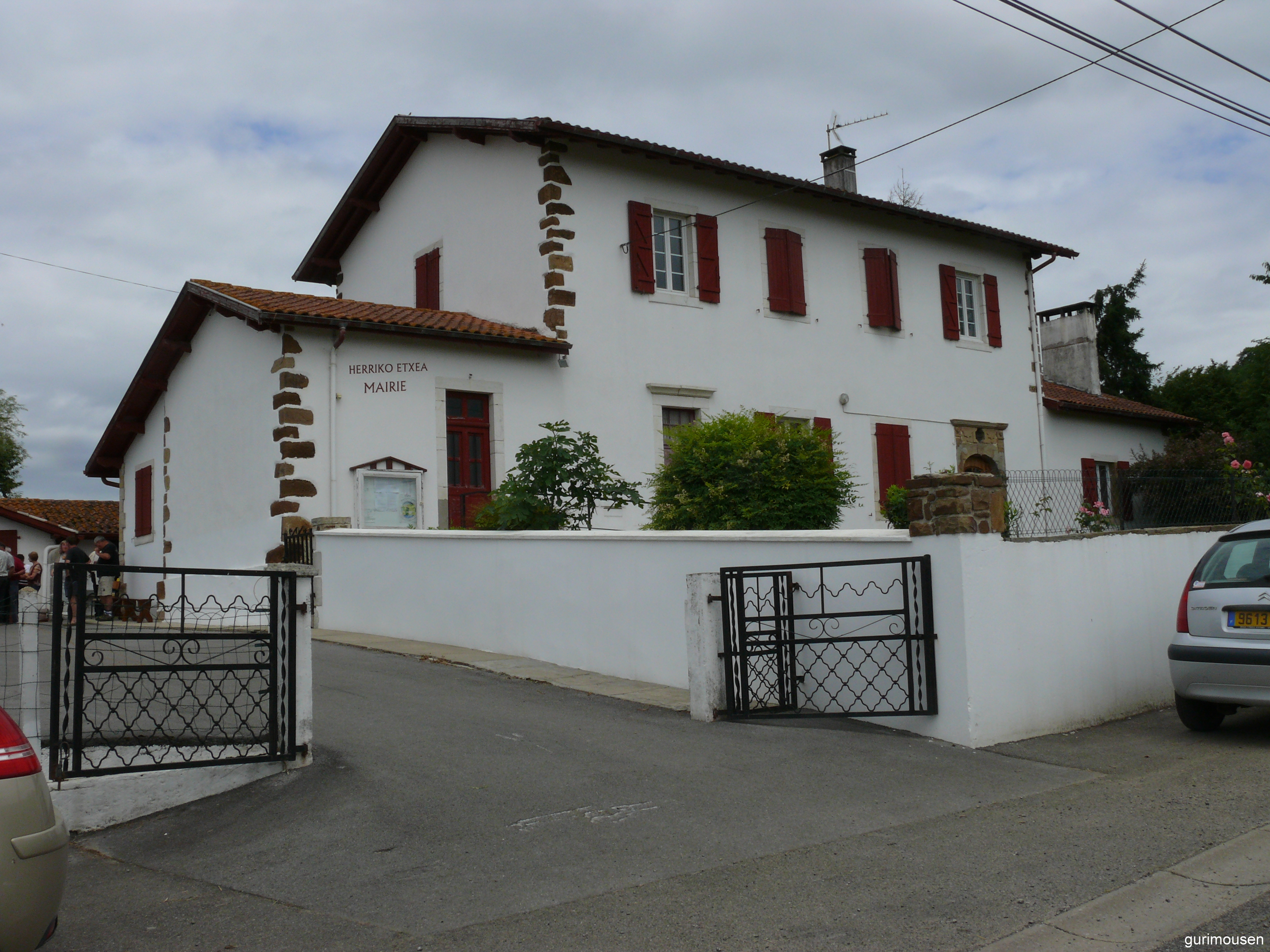
- Town hall

- Coat of arms
- Location of Ilharre
- Location within France Location within Nouvelle-Aquitaine
- Coordinates: 43°23′33″N 1°02′26″W
- Country: France
- Region: Nouvelle-Aquitaine
- Department: Pyrénées-Atlantiques
- Arrondissement: Bayonne
- Canton: Pays de Bidache, Amikuze et Ostibarre
- Intercommunality: CA Pays Basque

Government
  - Mayor (2020–2026): Jean Louis Etchart
- Area^{1}: 10.55 km^{2} (4.07 sq mi)
- Elevation: 35 m (115 ft)
- Highest elevation: 142 m (466 ft)
- Lowest elevation: 22 m (72 ft)
- Population (2023): 147
  - Density: 13.9/km^{2} (36.1/sq mi)
- Time zone: UTC+01:00 (CET)
  - Summer (DST): UTC+02:00 (CEST)
- INSEE/Postal code: 64272 /64120
- ^{1} French Land Register data, which excludes lakes, ponds, glaciers > 1 km^{2} (0.386 sq mi or 247 acres) and river estuaries.

Ilharre (French pronunciation: [ilaʁ]; Basque: Ilharre) is a commune in the Pyrénées-Atlantiques department in south-western France.

It is located in the former province of Lower Navarre.

== See also ==
- Communes of the Pyrénées-Atlantiques department
