= Arrondissement of Bayonne =

Coordinates: 43.48°N 1.48°W

Bayonne Baiona
- Arrondissement
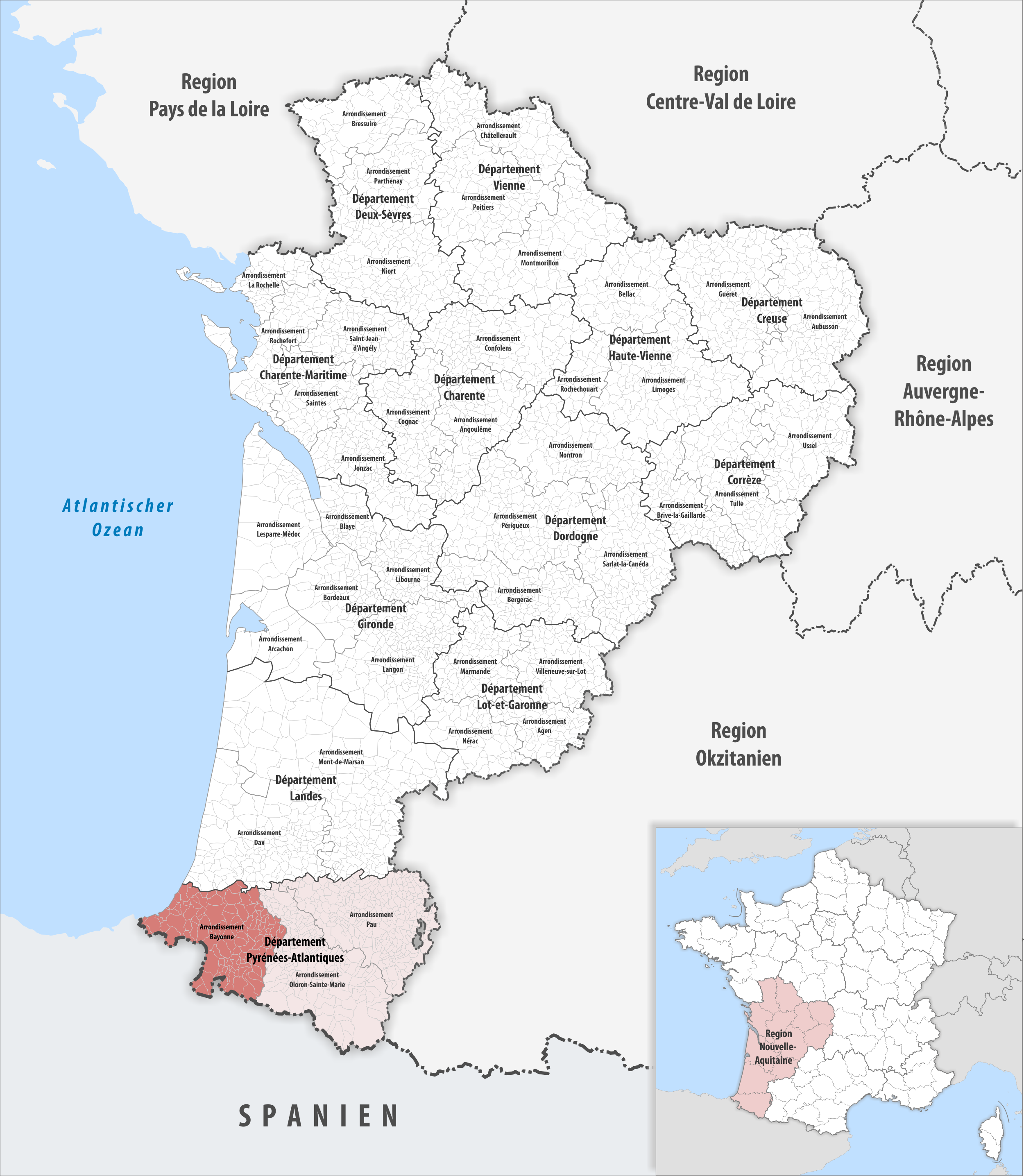
- Location within the region Nouvelle-Aquitaine
- Country: France
- Region: Nouvelle-Aquitaine
- Department: Pyrénées-Atlantiques
- No. of communes: {{{nbcomm}}}
- Area: 2,267.7 km^{2} (875.6 sq mi)
- Population (2023): 317,339
  - Density: 139.94/km^{2} (362.44/sq mi)
- INSEE code: 641

The arrondissement of Bayonne (Basque: Baioniko barrutia) is an arrondissement of France in the Pyrénées-Atlantiques department in the Nouvelle-Aquitaine region. It has 122 communes. Its population is 309,392 (2021), and its area is 2,267.7 km^{2} (875.6 sq mi).

== Composition ==
The communes of the arrondissement of Bayonne, and their INSEE codes, are:

1. Ahaxe-Alciette-Bascassan (64008)
2. Ahetze (64009)
3. Aïcirits-Camou-Suhast (64010)
4. Aincille (64011)
5. Ainhice-Mongelos (64013)
6. Ainhoa (64014)
7. Aldudes (64016)
8. Amendeuix-Oneix (64018)
9. Amorots-Succos (64019)
10. Anglet (64024)
11. Anhaux (64026)
12. Arancou (64031)
13. Arbérats-Sillègue (64034)
14. Arbonne (64035)
15. Arbouet-Sussaute (64036)
16. Arcangues (64038)
17. Arhansus (64045)
18. Armendarits (64046)
19. Arnéguy (64047)
20. Aroue-Ithorots-Olhaïby (64049)
21. Arraute-Charritte (64051)
22. Ascain (64065)
23. Ascarat (64066)
24. Ayherre (64086)
25. Banca (64092)
26. Bardos (64094)
27. Bassussarry (64100)
28. La Bastide-Clairence (64289)
29. Bayonne (64102)
30. Béguios (64105)
31. Béhasque-Lapiste (64106)
32. Béhorléguy (64107)
33. Bergouey-Viellenave (64113)
34. Beyrie-sur-Joyeuse (64120)
35. Biarritz (64122)
36. Bidache (64123)
37. Bidarray (64124)
38. Bidart (64125)
39. Biriatou (64130)
40. Bonloc (64134)
41. Boucau (64140)
42. Briscous (64147)
43. Bunus (64150)
44. Bussunarits-Sarrasquette (64154)
45. Bustince-Iriberry (64155)
46. Cambo-les-Bains (64160)
47. Came (64161)
48. Çaro (64166)
49. Ciboure (64189)
50. Domezain-Berraute (64202)
51. Espelette (64213)
52. Estérençuby (64218)
53. Etcharry (64221)
54. Gabat (64228)
55. Gamarthe (64229)
56. Garris (64235)
57. Guéthary (64249)
58. Guiche (64250)
59. Halsou (64255)
60. Hasparren (64256)
61. Hélette (64259)
62. Hendaye (64260)
63. Hosta (64265)
64. Ibarrolle (64267)
65. Iholdy (64271)
66. Ilharre (64272)
67. Irissarry (64273)
68. Irouléguy (64274)
69. Ispoure (64275)
70. Isturits (64277)
71. Itxassou (64279)
72. Jatxou (64282)
73. Jaxu (64283)
74. Juxue (64285)
75. Labets-Biscay (64294)
76. Lacarre (64297)
77. Lahonce (64304)
78. Lantabat (64313)
79. Larceveau-Arros-Cibits (64314)
80. Larressore (64317)
81. Larribar-Sorhapuru (64319)
82. Lasse (64322)
83. Lecumberry (64327)
84. Lohitzun-Oyhercq (64345)
85. Louhossoa (64350)
86. Luxe-Sumberraute (64362)
87. Macaye (64364)
88. Masparraute (64368)
89. Méharin (64375)
90. Mendionde (64377)
91. Mendive (64379)
92. Mouguerre (64407)
93. Orègue (64425)
94. Orsanco (64429)
95. Osserain-Rivareyte (64435)
96. Ossès (64436)
97. Ostabat-Asme (64437)
98. Pagolle (64441)
99. Saint-Esteben (64476)
100. Saint-Étienne-de-Baïgorry (64477)
101. Saint-Jean-de-Luz (64483)
102. Saint-Jean-le-Vieux (64484)
103. Saint-Jean-Pied-de-Port (64485)
104. Saint-Just-Ibarre (64487)
105. Saint-Martin-d'Arberoue (64489)
106. Saint-Martin-d'Arrossa (64490)
107. Saint-Michel (64492)
108. Saint-Palais (64493)
109. Saint-Pée-sur-Nivelle (64495)
110. Saint-Pierre-d'Irube (64496)
111. Sames (64502)
112. Sare (64504)
113. Souraïde (64527)
114. Suhescun (64528)
115. Uhart-Cize (64538)
116. Uhart-Mixe (64539)
117. Urcuit (64540)
118. Urepel (64543)
119. Urrugne (64545)
120. Urt (64546)
121. Ustaritz (64547)
122. Villefranque (64558)

== History ==
The arrondissement of Bayonne was created in 1800. At the January 2017 reorganisation of the arrondissements of Pyrénées-Atlantiques, it lost one commune to the arrondissement of Oloron-Sainte-Marie.

As a result of the reorganisation of the cantons of France which came into effect in 2015, the borders of the cantons are no longer related to the borders of the arrondissements. The cantons of the arrondissement of Bayonne were, as of January 2015:

1. Anglet-Nord
2. Anglet-Sud
3. La Bastide-Clairence
4. Bayonne-Est
5. Bayonne-Nord
6. Bayonne-Ouest
7. Biarritz-Est
8. Biarritz-Ouest
9. Bidache
10. Espelette
11. Hasparren
12. Hendaye
13. Iholdy
14. Saint-Étienne-de-Baïgorry
15. Saint-Jean-de-Luz
16. Saint-Jean-Pied-de-Port
17. Saint-Palais
18. Saint-Pierre-d'Irube
19. Ustaritz
