= Orsanco =

Orsanco Ostankoa (Basque)
- Commune
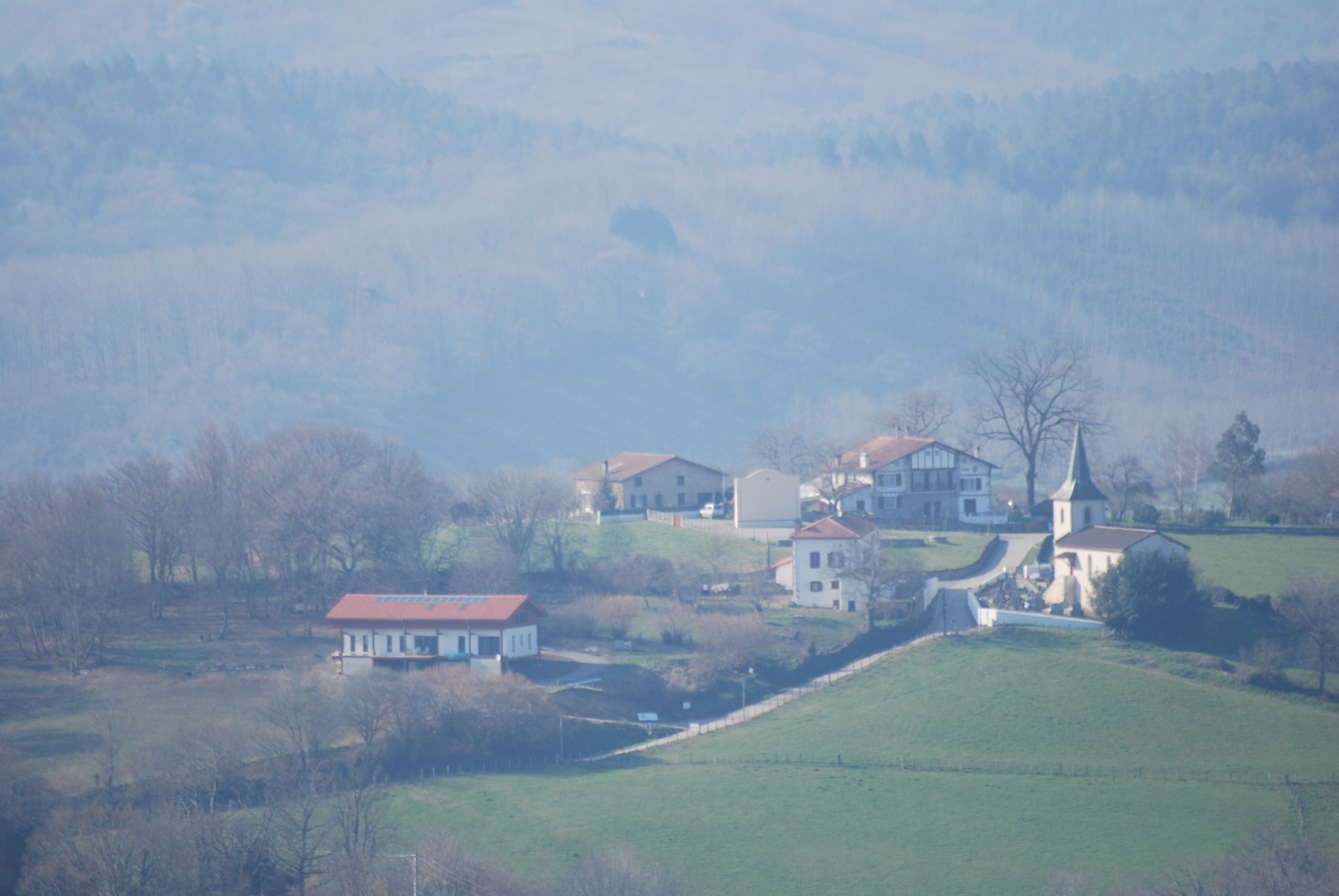
- A general view of Orsanco
- Location of Orsanco
- Location within France Location within Nouvelle-Aquitaine
- Coordinates: 43°17′38″N 1°03′51″W
- Country: France
- Region: Nouvelle-Aquitaine
- Department: Pyrénées-Atlantiques
- Arrondissement: Bayonne
- Canton: Pays de Bidache, Amikuze et Ostibarre
- Intercommunality: CA Pays Basque

Government
  - Mayor (2020–2026): Jean-Marc Bonzom
- Area^{1}: 9.35 km^{2} (3.61 sq mi)
- Elevation: 146 m (479 ft)
- Highest elevation: 307 m (1,007 ft)
- Lowest elevation: 72 m (236 ft)
- Population (2023): 102
  - Density: 10.9/km^{2} (28.3/sq mi)
- Time zone: UTC+01:00 (CET)
  - Summer (DST): UTC+02:00 (CEST)
- INSEE/Postal code: 64429 /64120
- ^{1} French Land Register data, which excludes lakes, ponds, glaciers > 1 km^{2} (0.386 sq mi or 247 acres) and river estuaries.

Orsanco (French pronunciation: [ɔʁsɑ̃ko]; Occitan: Orsanc; Basque: Ostankoa) is a commune in the Pyrénées-Atlantiques department in south-western France.

It is located in the former province of Lower Navarre.

== See also ==
- Communes of the Pyrénées-Atlantiques department
