= Larribar-Sorhapuru =

Larribar-Sorhapuru Larribarre-Sorhapürü
- Commune
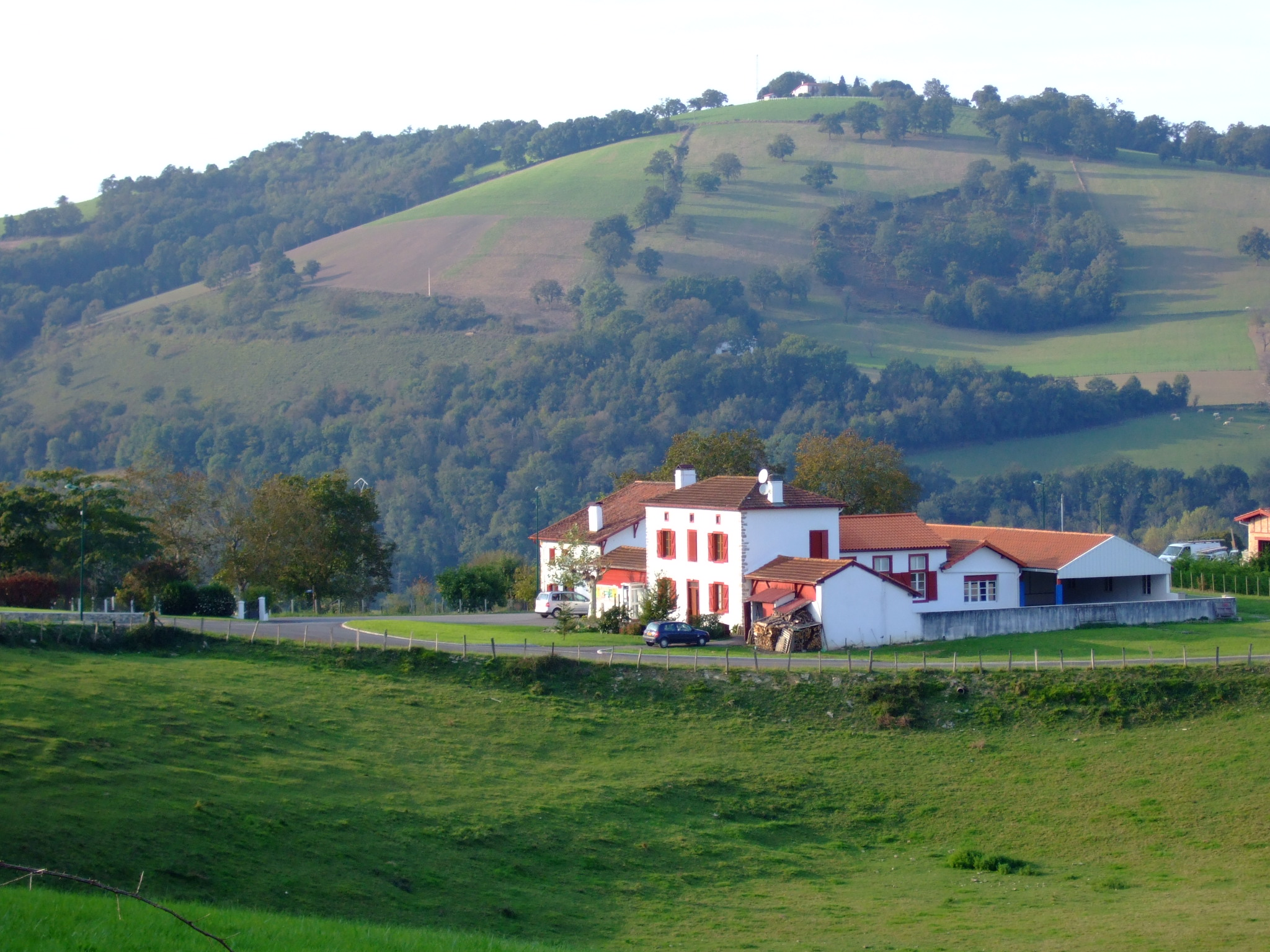
- A general view of Larribar
- Location of Larribar-Sorhapuru
- Location within France Location within Nouvelle-Aquitaine
- Coordinates: 43°17′36″N 1°00′47″W
- Country: France
- Region: Nouvelle-Aquitaine
- Department: Pyrénées-Atlantiques
- Arrondissement: Bayonne
- Canton: Pays de Bidache, Amikuze et Ostibarre
- Intercommunality: CA Pays Basque

Government
  - Mayor (2025–2026): Michel Irume
- Area^{1}: 10.65 km^{2} (4.11 sq mi)
- Elevation: 114 m (374 ft)
- Highest elevation: 245 m (804 ft)
- Lowest elevation: 54 m (177 ft)
- Population (2023): 187
  - Density: 17.6/km^{2} (45.5/sq mi)
- Time zone: UTC+01:00 (CET)
  - Summer (DST): UTC+02:00 (CEST)
- INSEE/Postal code: 64319 /64120
- ^{1} French Land Register data, which excludes lakes, ponds, glaciers > 1 km^{2} (0.386 sq mi or 247 acres) and river estuaries.

Larribar-Sorhapuru (French pronunciation: [laʁibaʁ sɔʁapyʁy]; Occitan: Arribar; Basque: Larribarre-Sorhapürü) is a commune in the Pyrénées-Atlantiques department in south-western France.

It is located in the former province of Lower Navarre.

== See also ==
- Communes of the Pyrénées-Atlantiques department
