= Méharin =

Méharin Mehaine
- Commune
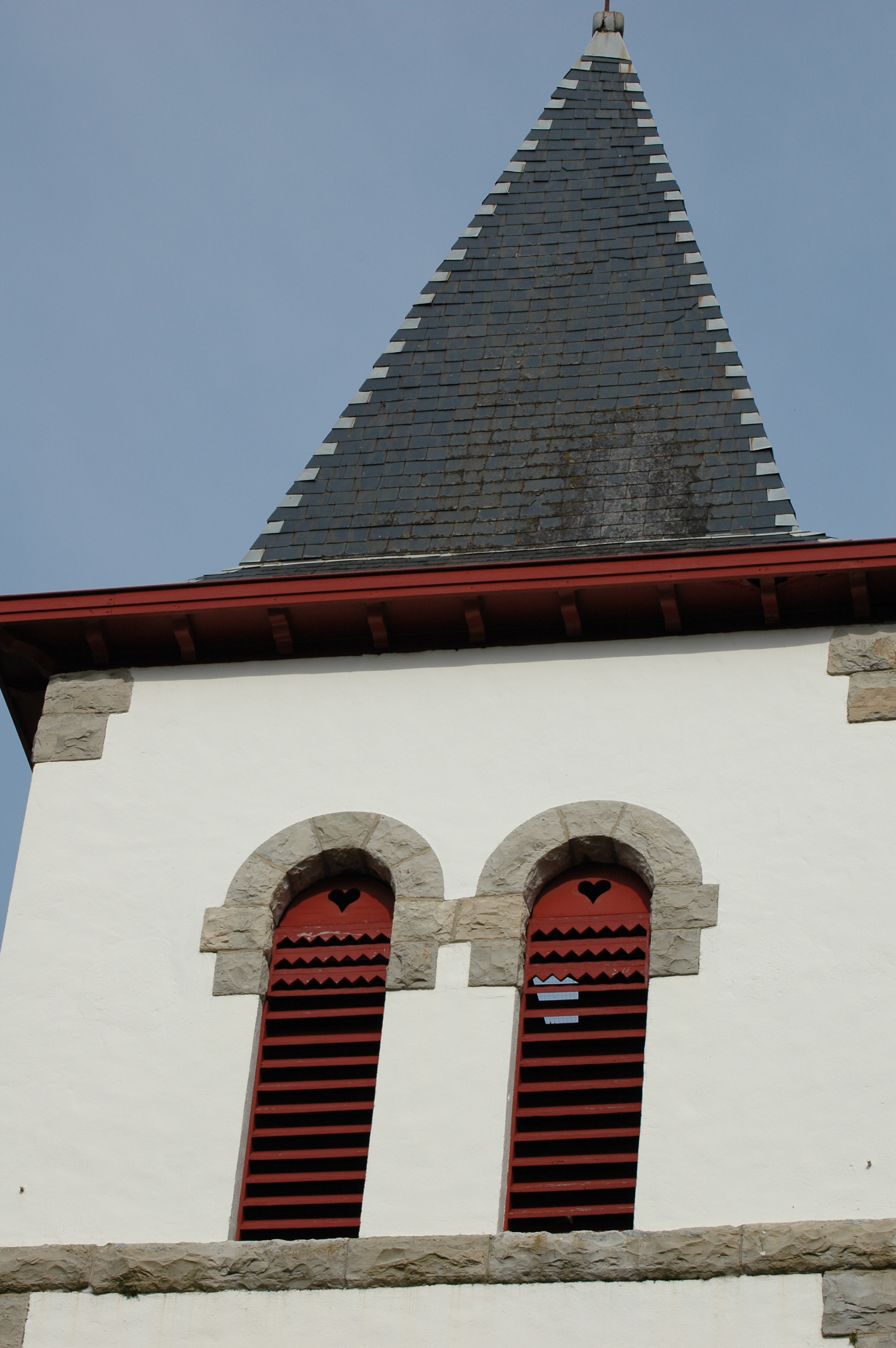
- The bell tower of the church of Méharin
- Location of Méharin
- Location within France Location within Nouvelle-Aquitaine
- Coordinates: 43°20′03″N 1°08′38″W
- Country: France
- Region: Nouvelle-Aquitaine
- Department: Pyrénées-Atlantiques
- Arrondissement: Bayonne
- Canton: Pays de Bidache, Amikuze et Ostibarre
- Intercommunality: CA Pays Basque

Government
  - Mayor (2020–2026): Sylvie Betat
- Area^{1}: 12.73 km^{2} (4.92 sq mi)
- Elevation: 134 m (440 ft)
- Highest elevation: 280 m (920 ft)
- Lowest elevation: 87 m (285 ft)
- Population (2023): 274
  - Density: 21.5/km^{2} (55.7/sq mi)
- Time zone: UTC+01:00 (CET)
  - Summer (DST): UTC+02:00 (CEST)
- INSEE/Postal code: 64375 /64120
- ^{1} French Land Register data, which excludes lakes, ponds, glaciers > 1 km^{2} (0.386 sq mi or 247 acres) and river estuaries.

Méharin (French pronunciation: [meaʁɛ̃]; Occitan: Montar camèl; Basque: Mehaine) is a commune in the Pyrénées-Atlantiques department in south-western France.

It is located in the former province of Lower Navarre.

== See also ==
- Communes of the Pyrénées-Atlantiques department
