= Canton of Pays de Bidache, Amikuze et Ostibarre =

Coordinates: 43.32°N 1.03°W

The canton of Pays de Bidache, Amikuze et Ostibarre is an administrative division of the Pyrénées-Atlantiques department, southwestern France. It was created at the French canton reorganisation which came into effect in March 2015. Its seat is in Saint-Palais.

It consists of the following communes:

1. Aïcirits-Camou-Suhast
2. Amendeuix-Oneix
3. Amorots-Succos
4. Arancou
5. Arbérats-Sillègue
6. Arbouet-Sussaute
7. Arhansus
8. Armendarits
9. Aroue-Ithorots-Olhaïby
10. Arraute-Charritte
11. Ayherre
12. La Bastide-Clairence
13. Béguios
14. Béhasque-Lapiste
15. Bergouey-Viellenave
16. Beyrie-sur-Joyeuse
17. Bidache
18. Bonloc
19. Bunus
20. Came
21. Domezain-Berraute
22. Etcharry
23. Gabat
24. Garris
25. Hélette
26. Hosta
27. Ibarrolle
28. Iholdy
29. Ilharre
30. Irissarry
31. Isturits
32. Juxue
33. Labets-Biscay
34. Lantabat
35. Larceveau-Arros-Cibits
36. Larribar-Sorhapuru
37. Lohitzun-Oyhercq
38. Luxe-Sumberraute
39. Masparraute
40. Méharin
41. Mendionde
42. Orègue
43. Orsanco
44. Osserain-Rivareyte
45. Ostabat-Asme
46. Pagolle
47. Saint-Esteben
48. Saint-Just-Ibarre
49. Saint-Martin-d'Arberoue
50. Saint-Palais
51. Suhescun
52. Uhart-Mixe
