= Labets-Biscay =

Labets-Biscay Labetze-Bizkai
- Commune
- Location of Labets-Biscay
- Location within France Location within Nouvelle-Aquitaine
- Coordinates: 43°23′06″N 1°03′23″W
- Country: France
- Region: Nouvelle-Aquitaine
- Department: Pyrénées-Atlantiques
- Arrondissement: Bayonne
- Canton: Pays de Bidache, Amikuze et Ostibarre
- Intercommunality: CA Pays Basque

Government
  - Mayor (2020–2026): Jean-François Anglade
- Area^{1}: 8.79 km^{2} (3.39 sq mi)
- Elevation: 30 m (98 ft)
- Highest elevation: 122 m (400 ft)
- Lowest elevation: 20 m (66 ft)
- Population (2023): 144
  - Density: 16.4/km^{2} (42.4/sq mi)
- Time zone: UTC+01:00 (CET)
  - Summer (DST): UTC+02:00 (CEST)
- INSEE/Postal code: 64294 /64120
- ^{1} French Land Register data, which excludes lakes, ponds, glaciers > 1 km^{2} (0.386 sq mi or 247 acres) and river estuaries.

Labets-Biscay (Basque: Labetze-Bizkai; Occitan: Biscaia) is a commune in the Pyrénées-Atlantiques department in south-western France.

It is located in the former province of Lower Navarre.

== See also ==
- Communes of the Pyrénées-Atlantiques department
