= Ibarrolle =

Ibarrolle Ibarrola
- Commune
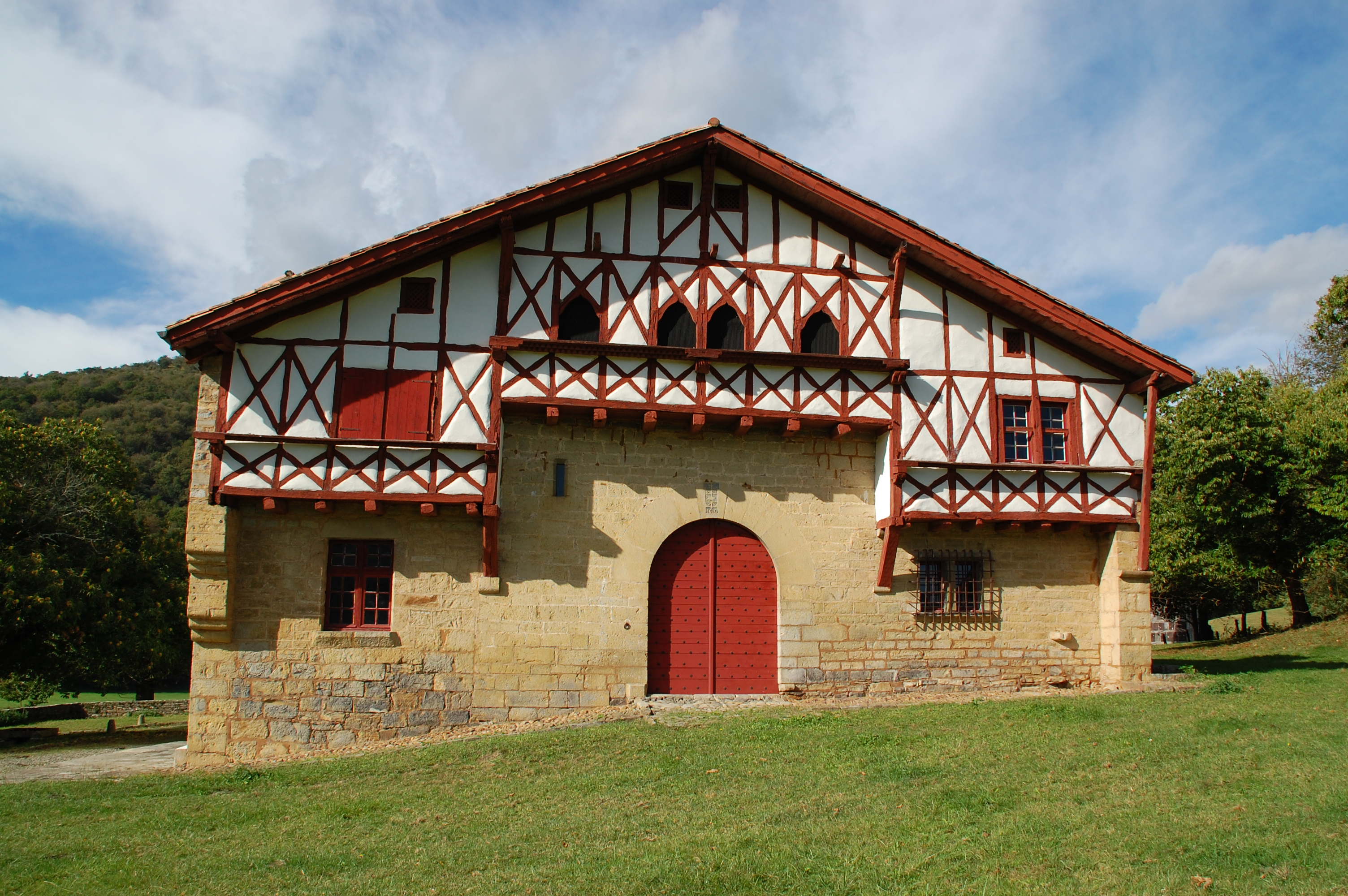
- The Etxepare farmhouse

- Coat of arms
- Location of Ibarrolle
- Location within France Location within Nouvelle-Aquitaine
- Coordinates: 43°12′03″N 1°05′38″W
- Country: France
- Region: Nouvelle-Aquitaine
- Department: Pyrénées-Atlantiques
- Arrondissement: Bayonne
- Canton: Pays de Bidache, Amikuze et Ostibarre
- Intercommunality: Pays Basque

Government
  - Mayor (2020–2026): Dominique Poydessus
- Area^{1}: 8.87 km^{2} (3.42 sq mi)
- Elevation: 160 m (520 ft)
- Highest elevation: 764 m (2,507 ft)
- Lowest elevation: 159 m (522 ft)
- Population (2023): 73
  - Density: 8.2/km^{2} (21/sq mi)
- Time zone: UTC+01:00 (CET)
  - Summer (DST): UTC+02:00 (CEST)
- INSEE/Postal code: 64267 /64120
- ^{1} French Land Register data, which excludes lakes, ponds, glaciers > 1 km^{2} (0.386 sq mi or 247 acres) and river estuaries.

Ibarrolle (French pronunciation: [ibaʁɔl]; Basque: Ibarrola) is a commune in the Pyrénées-Atlantiques department in south-western France.

It is located in the former province of Lower Navarre.

== Population ==
Historical population
Year	Pop.	±% p.a.
1968	110	—
1975	101	−1.21%
1982	91	−1.48%
1990	92	+0.14%
1999	88	−0.49%
2007	97	+1.22%
2012	95	−0.42%
2017	82	−2.90%
2023	73	−1.92%
Source: INSEE

== See also ==
- Communes of the Pyrénées-Atlantiques department
