= Garris, Pyrénées-Atlantiques =

Garris Garrüze
- Commune
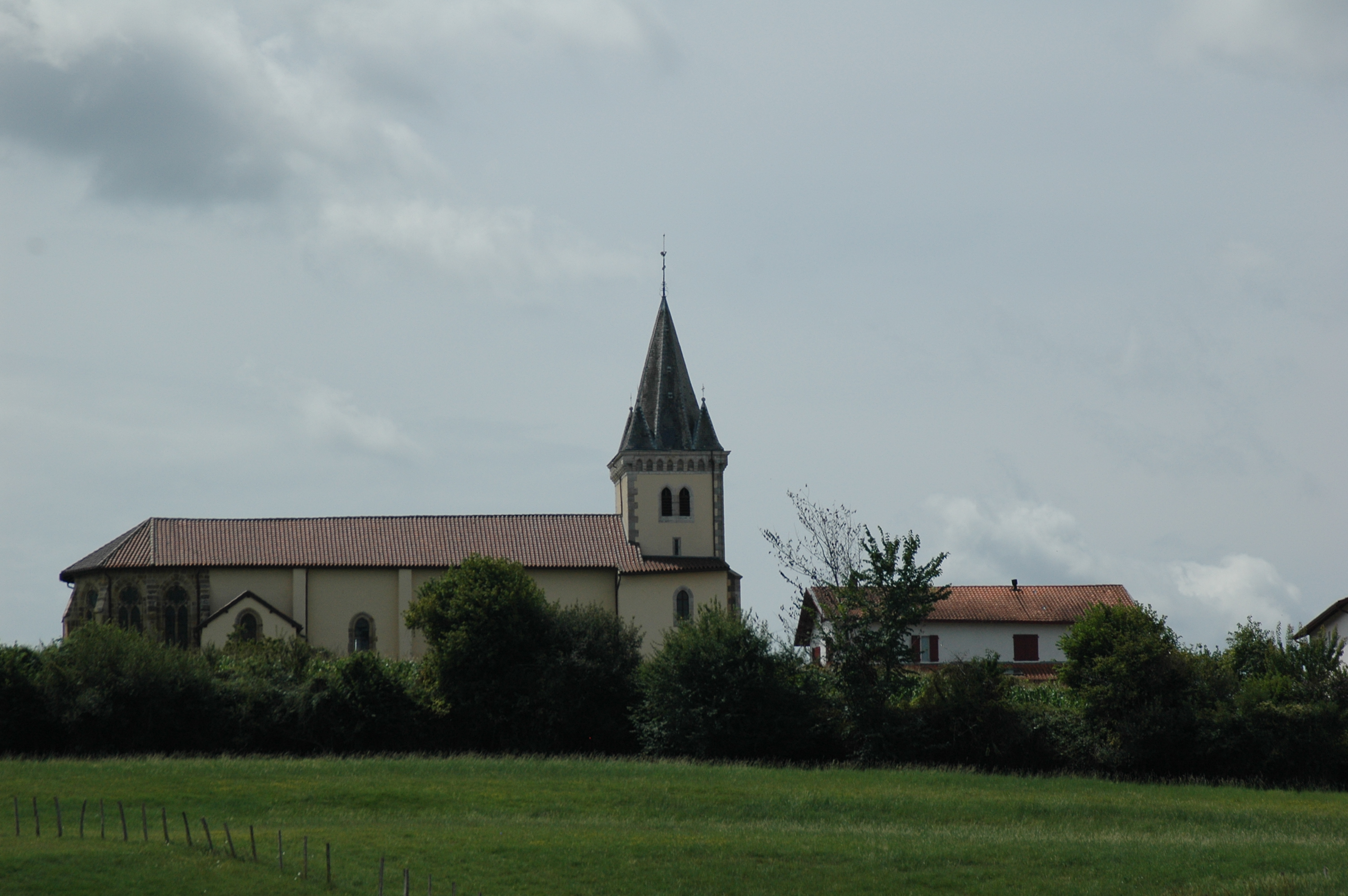
- The church of Saint-Félix, in Garris

- Coat of arms
- Location of Garris
- Location within France Location within Nouvelle-Aquitaine
- Coordinates: 43°20′36″N 1°03′36″W
- Country: France
- Region: Nouvelle-Aquitaine
- Department: Pyrénées-Atlantiques
- Arrondissement: Bayonne
- Canton: Pays de Bidache, Amikuze et Ostibarre
- Intercommunality: CA Pays Basque

Government
  - Mayor (2020–2026): Gérard Bidegain
- Area^{1}: 3.13 km^{2} (1.21 sq mi)
- Highest elevation: 219 m (719 ft)
- Lowest elevation: 73 m (240 ft)
- Population (2023): 320
  - Density: 100/km^{2} (260/sq mi)
- Time zone: UTC+01:00 (CET)
  - Summer (DST): UTC+02:00 (CEST)
- INSEE/Postal code: 64235 /64120
- ^{1} French Land Register data, which excludes lakes, ponds, glaciers > 1 km^{2} (0.386 sq mi or 247 acres) and river estuaries.

Garris (French pronunciation: [ɡaʁis]; Basque: Garrüze) is a commune in the Pyrénées-Atlantiques department in south-western France.

It is located in the former province of Lower Navarre.

== See also ==
- Communes of the Pyrénées-Atlantiques department
