= Juxue =

Juxue Jutsi
- Commune
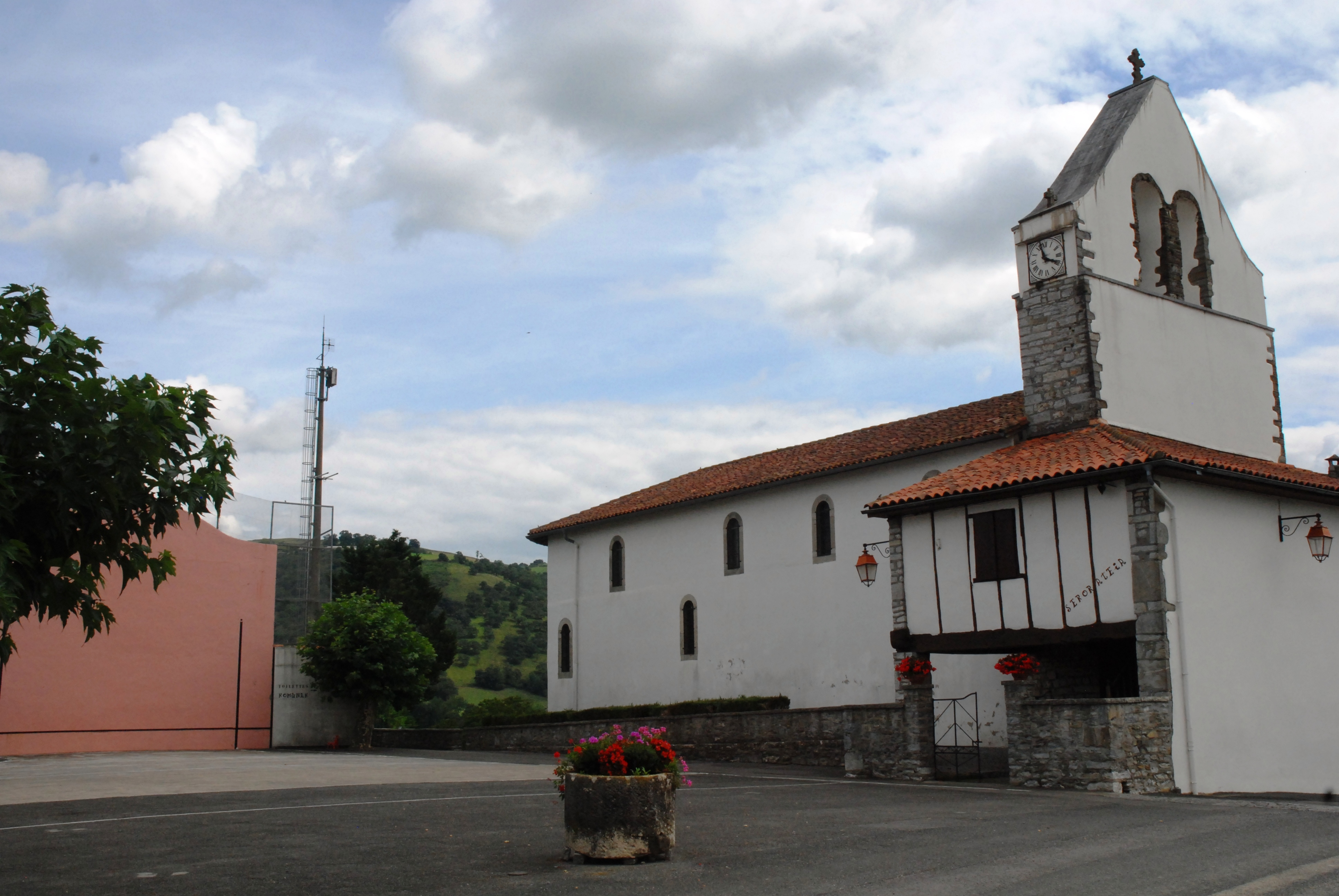
- The church of Saint-Pierre, in Juxue
- Location of Juxue
- Location within France Location within Nouvelle-Aquitaine
- Coordinates: 43°14′13″N 1°02′42″W
- Country: France
- Region: Nouvelle-Aquitaine
- Department: Pyrénées-Atlantiques
- Arrondissement: Bayonne
- Canton: Pays de Bidache, Amikuze et Ostibarre
- Intercommunality: CA Pays Basque

Government
  - Mayor (2020–2026): Jean-Michel Irume
- Area^{1}: 15.17 km^{2} (5.86 sq mi)
- Elevation: 159 m (522 ft)
- Highest elevation: 657 m (2,156 ft)
- Lowest elevation: 91 m (299 ft)
- Population (2023): 200
  - Density: 13/km^{2} (34/sq mi)
- Time zone: UTC+01:00 (CET)
  - Summer (DST): UTC+02:00 (CEST)
- INSEE/Postal code: 64285 /64120
- ^{1} French Land Register data, which excludes lakes, ponds, glaciers > 1 km^{2} (0.386 sq mi or 247 acres) and river estuaries.

Juxue (French pronunciation: [ʒyksy]; Occitan: Jucèu; Basque: Jutsi) is a commune in the Pyrénées-Atlantiques department in south-western France.

It is located in the former province of Lower Navarre.

== See also ==
- Communes of the Pyrénées-Atlantiques department
