= Osserain-Rivareyte =

Osserain-Rivareyte Ozaraine-Erribareita (Basque)
- Commune
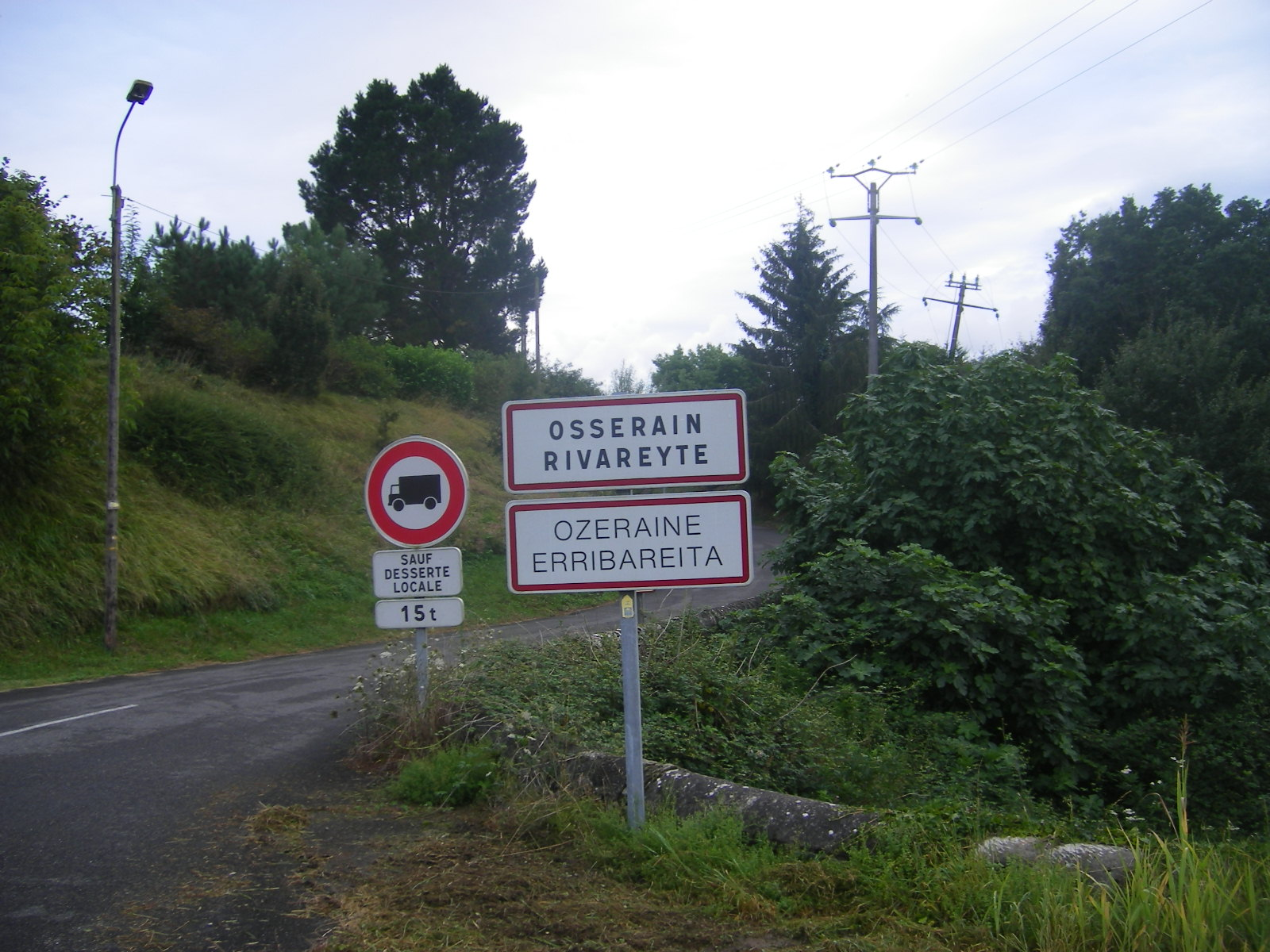
- The road into Osserain-Rivareyte

- Coat of arms
- Location of Osserain-Rivareyte
- Location within France Location within Nouvelle-Aquitaine
- Coordinates: 43°22′42″N 0°57′39″W
- Country: France
- Region: Nouvelle-Aquitaine
- Department: Pyrénées-Atlantiques
- Arrondissement: Bayonne
- Canton: Pays de Bidache, Amikuze et Ostibarre
- Intercommunality: CA Pays Basque

Government
  - Mayor (2020–2026): Arnaud Fontaine
- Area^{1}: 6.56 km^{2} (2.53 sq mi)
- Elevation: 70 m (230 ft)
- Highest elevation: 187 m (614 ft)
- Lowest elevation: 44 m (144 ft)
- Population (2023): 235
  - Density: 35.8/km^{2} (92.8/sq mi)
- Time zone: UTC+01:00 (CET)
  - Summer (DST): UTC+02:00 (CEST)
- INSEE/Postal code: 64435 /64390
- ^{1} French Land Register data, which excludes lakes, ponds, glaciers > 1 km^{2} (0.386 sq mi or 247 acres) and river estuaries.

Osserain-Rivareyte (Basque: Ozaraine-Erribareita) is a commune in the Pyrénées-Atlantiques department in south-western France.

It is located in the historical province of Soule.

== See also ==
- Communes of the Pyrénées-Atlantiques department
