= Garris (surname) =

Garris is a surname. Notable people with the surname include:

- Eric Garris (born 1953), American libertarian activist
- John Garris, multiple people
- Kiwane Garris (born 1974), American basketball player
- Mick Garris (born 1951), American filmmaker
- Stefano Garris (born 1979), German basketball player
- Bryan Garris (born 1993), American musician
