= Lohitzun-Oyhercq =

Lohitzun-Oyhercq Lohitzüne-Oihergi
- Commune
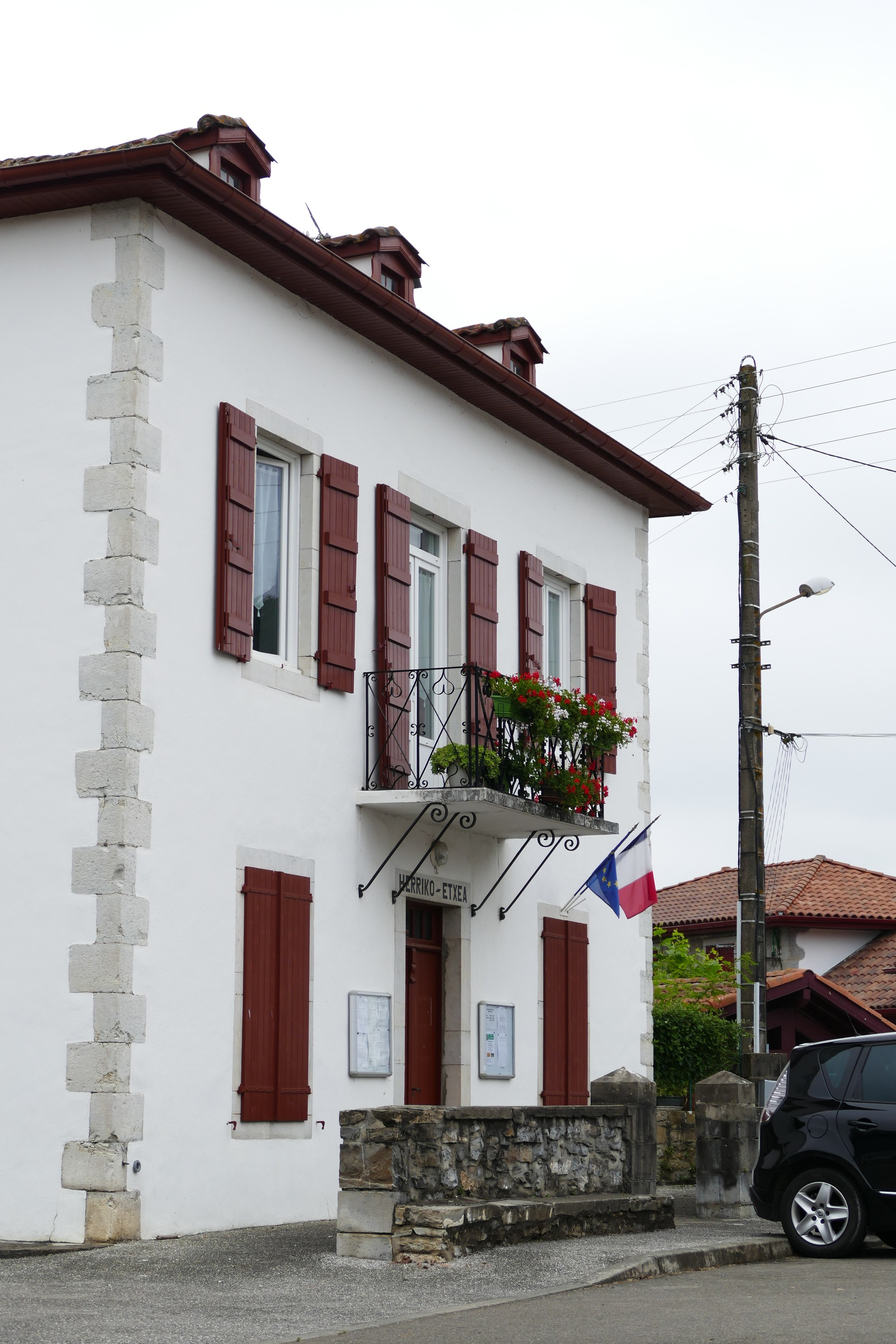
- Town hall
- Location of Lohitzun-Oyhercq
- Location within France Location within Nouvelle-Aquitaine
- Coordinates: 43°16′38″N 0°58′34″W
- Country: France
- Region: Nouvelle-Aquitaine
- Department: Pyrénées-Atlantiques
- Arrondissement: Bayonne
- Canton: Pays de Bidache, Amikuze et Ostibarre
- Intercommunality: CA Pays Basque

Government
  - Mayor (2020–2026): Marie-Agnès Chapar
- Area^{1}: 17.52 km^{2} (6.76 sq mi)
- Elevation: 239 m (784 ft)
- Highest elevation: 350 m (1,150 ft)
- Lowest elevation: 107 m (351 ft)
- Population (2023): 192
  - Density: 11.0/km^{2} (28.4/sq mi)
- Time zone: UTC+01:00 (CET)
  - Summer (DST): UTC+02:00 (CEST)
- INSEE/Postal code: 64345 /64120
- ^{1} French Land Register data, which excludes lakes, ponds, glaciers > 1 km^{2} (0.386 sq mi or 247 acres) and river estuaries.

Lohitzun-Oyhercq (French pronunciation: [lɔitsœ̃ ɔjɛʁk]; Basque: Lohitzüne-Oihergi) is a commune in the Pyrénées-Atlantiques department in south-western France.

It is located in the historical province of Soule.

== See also ==
- Communes of the Pyrénées-Atlantiques department
