= Hosta, Pyrénées-Atlantiques =

Hosta Hozta
- Commune
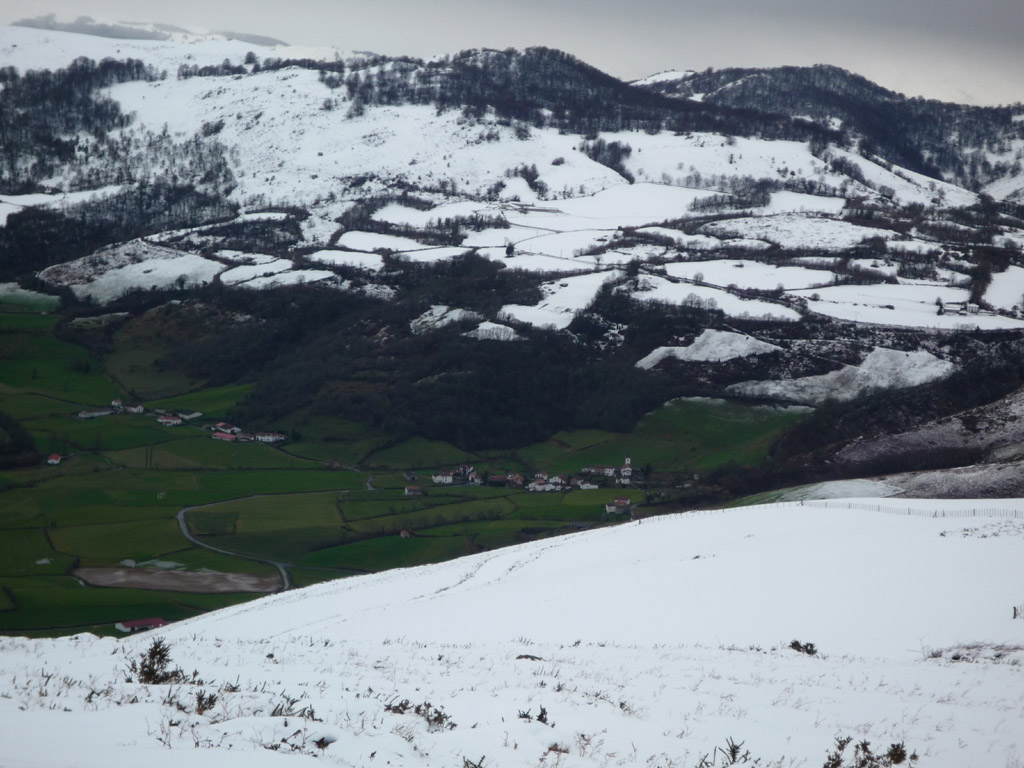
- Hosta seen from Belchou
- Location of Hosta
- Location within France Location within Nouvelle-Aquitaine
- Coordinates: 43°09′33″N 1°05′12″W
- Country: France
- Region: Nouvelle-Aquitaine
- Department: Pyrénées-Atlantiques
- Arrondissement: Bayonne
- Canton: Pays de Bidache, Amikuze et Ostibarre
- Intercommunality: CA Pays Basque

Government
  - Mayor (2022–2026): Arnaud Pierre Bidegain
- Area^{1}: 17.08 km^{2} (6.59 sq mi)
- Elevation: 442 m (1,450 ft)
- Highest elevation: 1,155 m (3,789 ft)
- Lowest elevation: 260 m (850 ft)
- Population (2023): 100
  - Density: 5.9/km^{2} (15/sq mi)
- Time zone: UTC+01:00 (CET)
  - Summer (DST): UTC+02:00 (CEST)
- INSEE/Postal code: 64265 /64120
- ^{1} French Land Register data, which excludes lakes, ponds, glaciers > 1 km^{2} (0.386 sq mi or 247 acres) and river estuaries.

Hosta (French pronunciation: [ɔsta]; Occitan: Ostal; Basque: Hozta) is a commune in the Pyrénées-Atlantiques department in south-western France.

It is located in the former province of Lower Navarre.

== See also ==
- Communes of the Pyrénées-Atlantiques department
