= Saint-Palais, Pyrénées-Atlantiques =

Saint-Palais Donapaleu (Basque)
- Commune
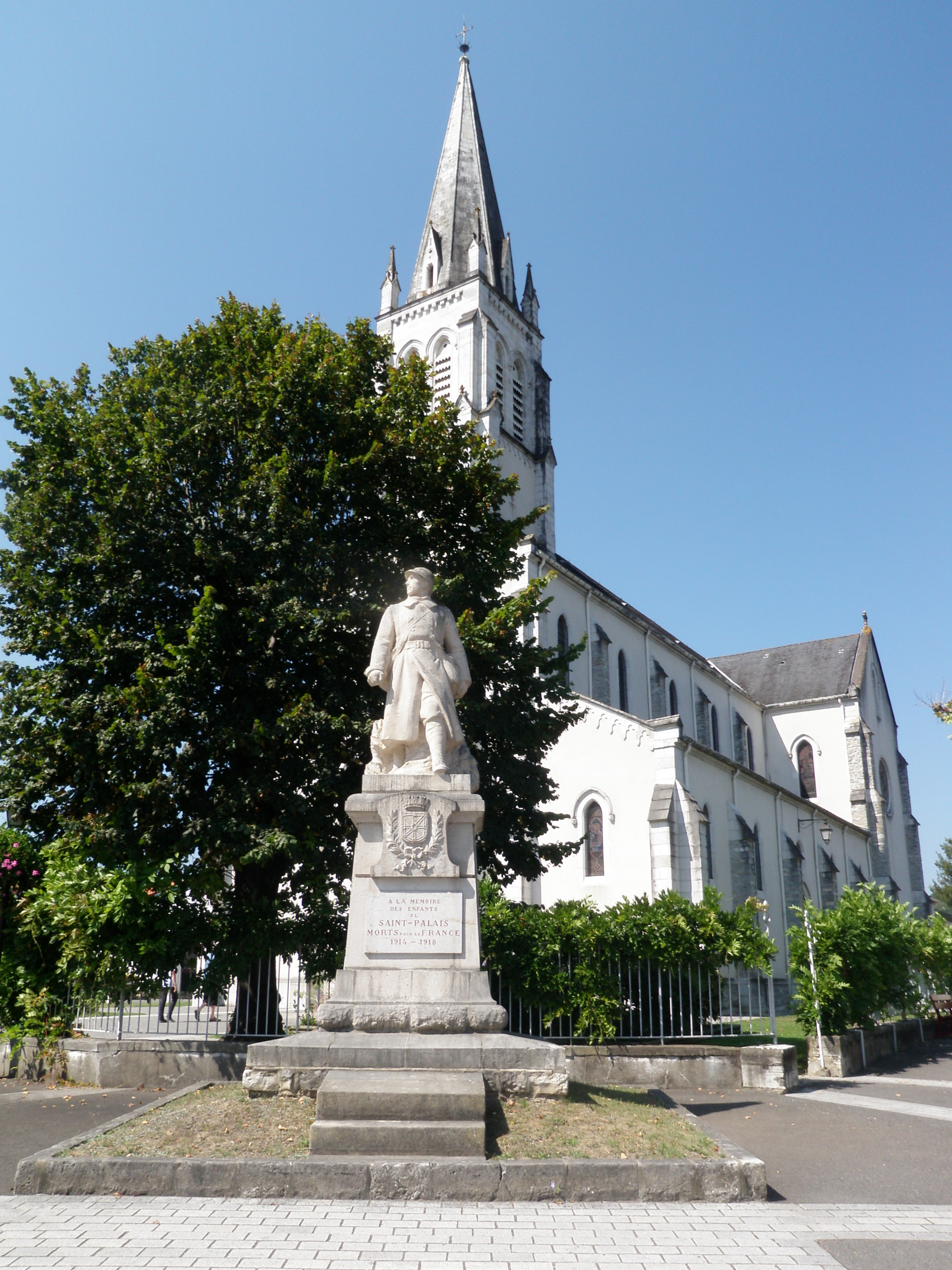
- The church of Saint-Palais

- Coat of arms
- Location of Saint-Palais
- Location within France Location within Nouvelle-Aquitaine
- Coordinates: 43°19′45″N 1°01′57″W
- Country: France
- Region: Nouvelle-Aquitaine
- Department: Pyrénées-Atlantiques
- Arrondissement: Bayonne
- Canton: Pays de Bidache, Amikuze et Ostibarre
- Intercommunality: CA Pays Basque

Government
  - Mayor (2020–2026): Charles Massondo
- Area^{1}: 7.44 km^{2} (2.87 sq mi)
- Elevation: 67 m (220 ft)
- Highest elevation: 263 m (863 ft)
- Lowest elevation: 52 m (171 ft)
- Population (2023): 2,204
  - Density: 296/km^{2} (767/sq mi)
- Time zone: UTC+01:00 (CET)
  - Summer (DST): UTC+02:00 (CEST)
- INSEE/Postal code: 64493 /64120
- ^{1} French Land Register data, which excludes lakes, ponds, glaciers > 1 km^{2} (0.386 sq mi or 247 acres) and river estuaries.

Saint-Palais (French pronunciation: [sɛ̃ palɛ]; Occitan: Sant-Palau; Basque: Donapaleu) is a commune in the Pyrénées-Atlantiques department in south-western France.

It is located in the former province of Lower Navarre.

== Population ==
Historical population
Year	Pop.	±% p.a.
1968	1,925	—
1975	1,875	−0.38%
1982	1,830	−0.35%
1990	1,773	−0.39%
1999	1,701	−0.46%
2007	1,875	+1.22%
2012	1,856	−0.20%
2017	1,838	−0.19%
2023	2,204	+3.07%
Source: INSEE

== Notable people ==
- Lucie Leiciague (1880–1962), communist

== See also ==
- Communes of the Pyrénées-Atlantiques department
