= Arhan =

Arhan may refer to:

- Arhat, a concept in Buddhism
- Arihant (Jainism)
- Pratama Arhan (born 2001), Indonesian footballer
- Arhan, Iran, a village in Zanjan Province, Iran
- Arhaan, an Indian name (including a list of people with the name)

== See also ==
- Arxan, city in Inner Mongolia, China
- Arihant (disambiguation)
- Arhansus
