= Lehan =

Lehan is a surname. Notable people with the surname include:

- Adam Lehan, British guitarist
- James Lehan (1856–1946), American baseball player
- Michael Lehan (born 1979), American football player
- Léhan Claassen (born 1990), South African entrepreneur, visionary, wealth creator, and philanthropist

== See also ==
- Behan
- Lohan
