= Luohan (disambiguation) =

Luohan (or "lohan" in older sources) is Chinese for arhat.

Luohan may also refer to:

- Luohan or Flowerhorn cichlid, a cichlid fish hybrid

== See also ==
- Lohan (disambiguation)
- Arihant (disambiguation)
- Yixian glazed pottery luohans
- Luohan quan, named after the Chinese word for arhat
- Luóhàn guǒ (arhat's fruit), the Chinese word for the fruit of Siraitia grosvenorii
- Luóhàn zhāi (vegetarian arhat), a Chinese dish also known as Buddha's delight
