= Rakan =

Rakan may refer to:

== People ==
=== Given name ===
- Rakan Daqeri (born 1999), Iranian author
- Rakan Al-Hafdhi (born 1995), Saudi footballer
- Rakan bin Hithlain (1814–1892), Arab prince, poet, and warrior
- Rakan Kaabi (born 2002), Saudi footballer
- Rakan Al-Khalidi (born 1988), Jordanian footballer
- Rakan Al-Nisf (born 1980), Kuwaiti politician
- Rakan Rushaidat (born 1977), Jordanian-born Croatian actor
- Rakan Al-Shamlan (born 1998), Saudi footballer

== Places ==
- Radekan, Qazvin, a village in Iran that is also called "Rakan"

== Other ==
- In Japanese, the word for an Arhat, in Buddhism, a saint or person who has attained nirvana
- Rakan, a playable character from League of Legends.

== See also ==
- Arakan (disambiguation)
- Arihant (disambiguation)
- Rakan-ji, a Sōtō temple in Nakatsu, Oita Prefecture, Japan
