= Mafia Ambiguity =

Crime novel

- Author: Rakan Daqeri
- Language: Arabic
- Genre: Crime
- Publisher: International Hozeyeh Mashgh Publications
- Publication date: 2025
- Award: Best Arabic Book of the Year
- ISBN: 978-622-387-707-0

Mafia Ambiguity (Arabic: غموض المافيا) is a crime novel written by Rakan Daqeri, published in 2025 by International Hozeyeh Mashgh Publications. Due to positive reviews, it received the Best Arabic Book of the Year award from Publications.

The novel narrates a complex murder case in which a man named Yasin Al-Kheybari is introduced as the main suspect. The fifth chapter of the book is considered one of the most prominent parts of the novel due to its strong plot twist and the revelation of layers of truth.
