= Arihant =

Arihant, Arihanta, Arahant or Arhat may refer to:

- Arihant (Jainism), in Jainism, a siddha who has not yet died
- Arhat, in Buddhism, a person who has attained nirvana, the perfected one
- Arahant Mahinda Thera or Mahinda, son of the Indian emperor Ashoka; a Buddhist monk
- Arahant Upatissa, Buddhist scholar in Sri Lanka, author of Vimuktimarga, a 1st or 2nd century CE treatise on Abhidharma
- Arahanthgiri Jain Math, Jain temple in Tirumalai, Tamil Nadu, India
- Arhat Boxing or Luohanquan, a Chinese martial arts style
- Arhat of Yixian or Yixian glazed pottery luohans, Buddhist sculptures from China
- Arhat fruit, the Siraitia grosvenorii
- Arihant-class submarine, a class of submarines being developed for the Indian Navy
- INS Arihant, the lead ship of India's Arihant class of nuclear-powered submarines
- Arihant Majestic Towers, residential area in Chennai, India
- Arhatha, a 1990 Indian film

== See also ==
- Arhan (disambiguation), alternative form
- Luohan (disambiguation), arhat in Chinese
- Rakan (disambiguation), arhat in Japanese
- Arahan, a 2004 South Korean action film
