= Arhansus =

Arhansus Arhantsusi
- Commune
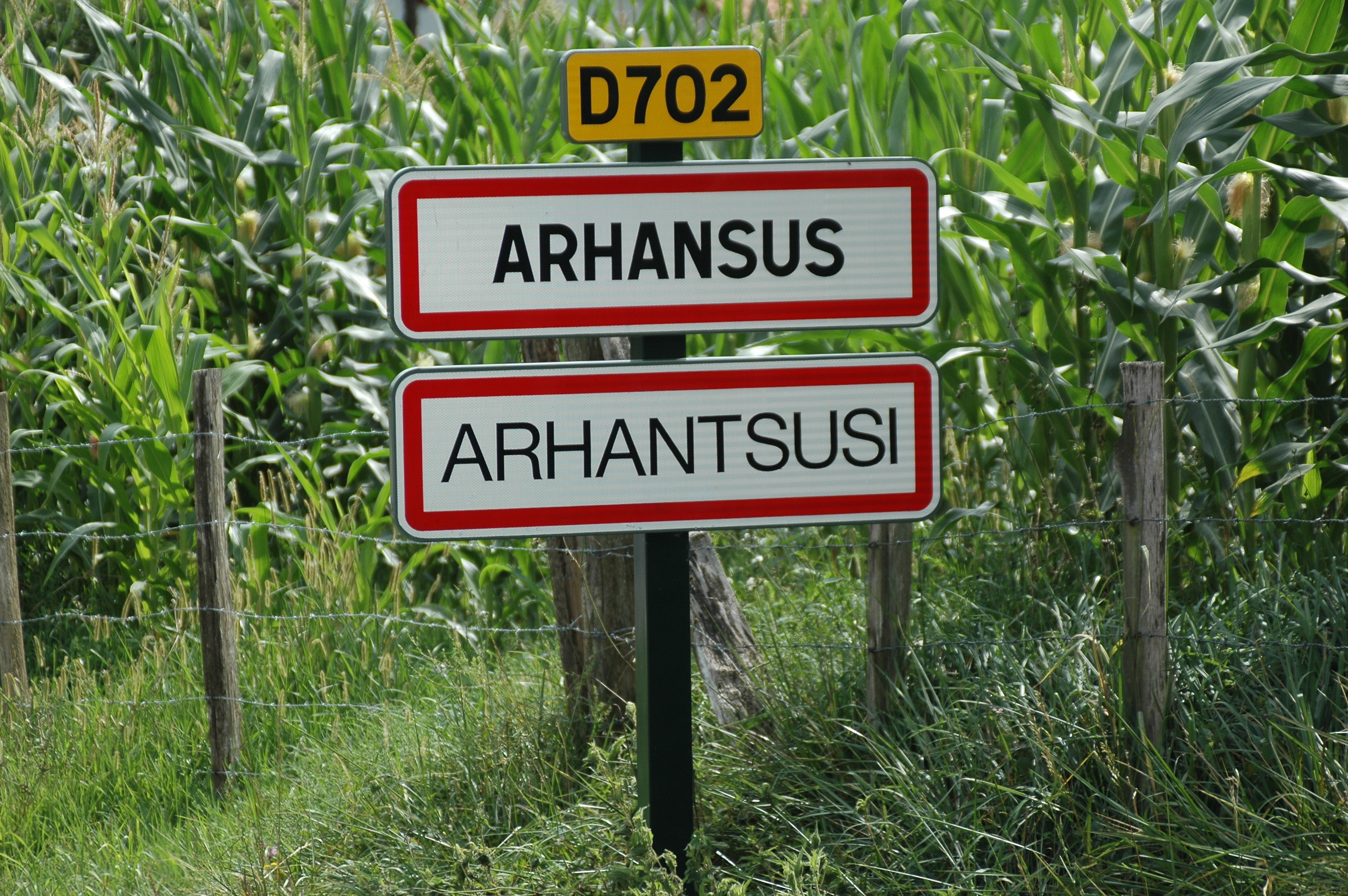
- Arhansus sign

- Coat of arms
- Location of Arhansus
- Location within France Location within Nouvelle-Aquitaine
- Coordinates: 43°15′30″N 1°02′04″W
- Country: France
- Region: Nouvelle-Aquitaine
- Department: Pyrénées-Atlantiques
- Arrondissement: Bayonne
- Canton: Pays de Bidache, Amikuze et Ostibarre
- Intercommunality: CA Pays Basque

Government
  - Mayor (2020–2026): Christine Erdozaincy-Etchart
- Area^{1}: 5.32 km^{2} (2.05 sq mi)
- Elevation: 291 m (955 ft)
- Highest elevation: 370 m (1,210 ft)
- Lowest elevation: 60 m (200 ft)
- Population (2023): 66
  - Density: 12/km^{2} (32/sq mi)
- Time zone: UTC+01:00 (CET)
  - Summer (DST): UTC+02:00 (CEST)
- INSEE/Postal code: 64045 /64120
- ^{1} French Land Register data, which excludes lakes, ponds, glaciers > 1 km^{2} (0.386 sq mi or 247 acres) and river estuaries.

Arhansus (French pronunciation: [aʁɑ̃sys]; Basque: Arhantsusi) is a commune in the Pyrénées-Atlantiques department in the Nouvelle-Aquitaine region of south-western France.

The inhabitants of the commune are known as Arhantsusiar or Arhantsusitar.

== Geography ==
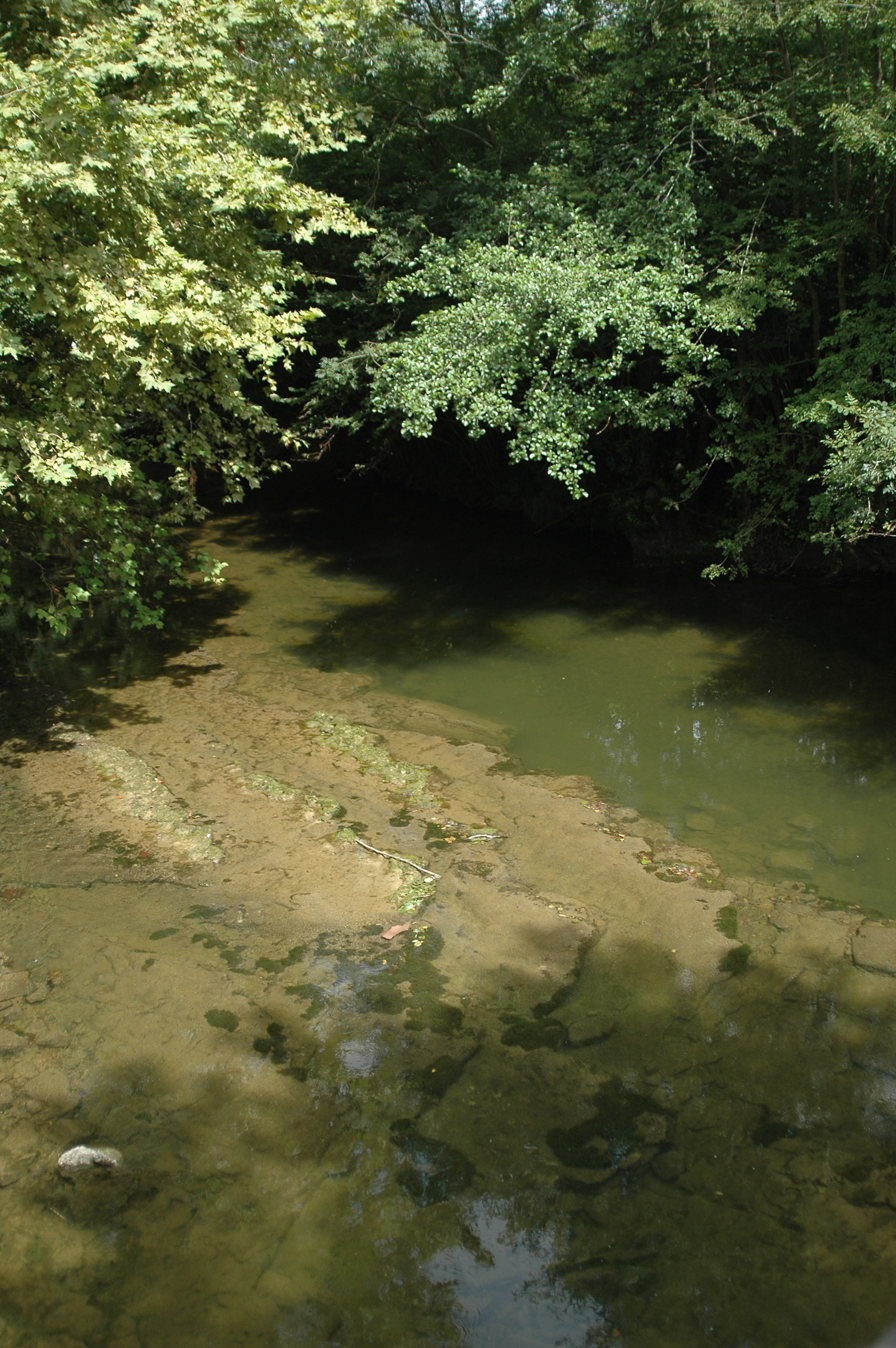
The Bidouze at Arhansus

Arhansus is located in the former basque province of Lower Navarre some 10 km south of Saint-Palais and 8 km north-east of Larceveau-Arros-Cibits. Access to the commune is solely by country roads with at least two country roads connecting the village to the D933 road from Larceveau-Arros-Cibrits to Uhart-Mixe which passes outside and parallel to the western border of the commune. The commune consists almost entirely of farmland with a few small patches of forest.

The Bidouze river forms the western border of the commune flowing north with two small streams rising in the commune and joining it. One stream is the northern border of the commune.

=== Places and Hamlets ===
- Aguerrengoyhenko Borda (ruins)
- Bidartia
- Bordaberria
- Carricondoa
- Castellu Cahara or Gastelusare
- Charcoa
- Cuçuluteguia
- Elgartia
- Etchessaria
- Eyhera
- Eyheraberria
- Goyhenetchea
- Haramberria
- Harispouria
- Hirrundoya
- Inchaurrague
- Ithurbidia
- Larrondoa
- Lastapia
- Mendionda
- Olieta
- Portasanse
- Solaquia
- Uligainia

== Toponymy ==
The commune's name in basque is Arhantsusi (or Arhantsuse). The name is based on the basque radical Arhan-, Arran- from where Arhantz is derived but the etymology "where blackthorn abounds" is uncertain.

The following table details the origins of the commune name and other names in the commune.

Name	Spelling	Date	Source	Page	Origin	Description
Arhansus	Sanctus stephanus de aranchiis	1160	Orpustan	93		Village
	Aranchus	1160	Orpustan	93		
	Arhanssus	1291	Orpustan	93		
	Eransus	1305	Orpustan	93		
	Aransus	1305	Orpustan	93		
	Arhansus	1365	Orpustan	93		
	Arhansus	1413	Orpustan	93		
	Aransus	1513	Raymond	10	Pamplona	
	Aransusi	1621	Orpustan	93		
L'Eldurne	L'Eldurne	1863	Raymond	58		Stream, tributary of the Bidouze crossing Arhansus
Etchepare	Etchepare	1863	Raymond	63		Fief, under the Kingdom of Navarre
Etcheverry	Etcheverry	1863	Raymond	63		Fief, under the Kingdom of Navarre
Gaztelu Zahar	Gastellusahar	1750	Cassini			Mountain between Arhansus and Juxue
	Gastelluçar	1863	Raymond	68		

Sources:

- Orpustan: Jean-Baptiste Orpustan, New Basque Toponymy
- Raymond: Topographic Dictionary of the Department of Basses-Pyrenees, 1863, on the page numbers indicated in the table. (in French)
- Cassini: Cassini Map from 1750

Origins:

- Pamplona: Titles of Pamplona

== History ==
=== Heraldry ===
Arms of the Arhansus family	Blazon of the Arhansus Family of Lower Navarre Blazon: Gules, 15 billets Or at orle.

Arms of the Etchepare (Arhansus) family	Blazon of the Etchepare (Arhansus) Family - former fief of the Kingdom of Navarre Blazon: Party per fesse, 1 Or, 2 Gules with a crescent inverted Argent.

== Administration ==
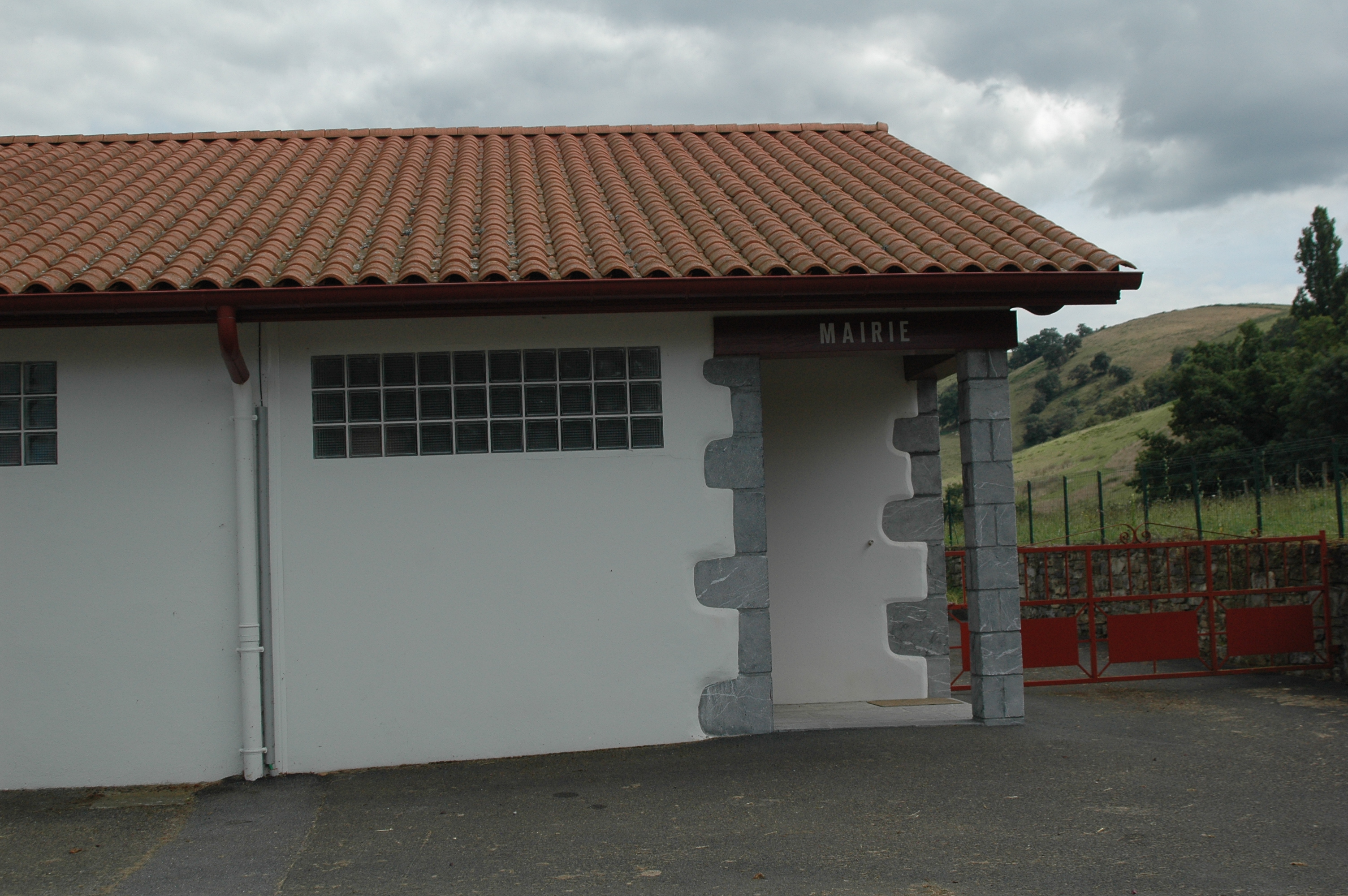
Arhansus Town Hall

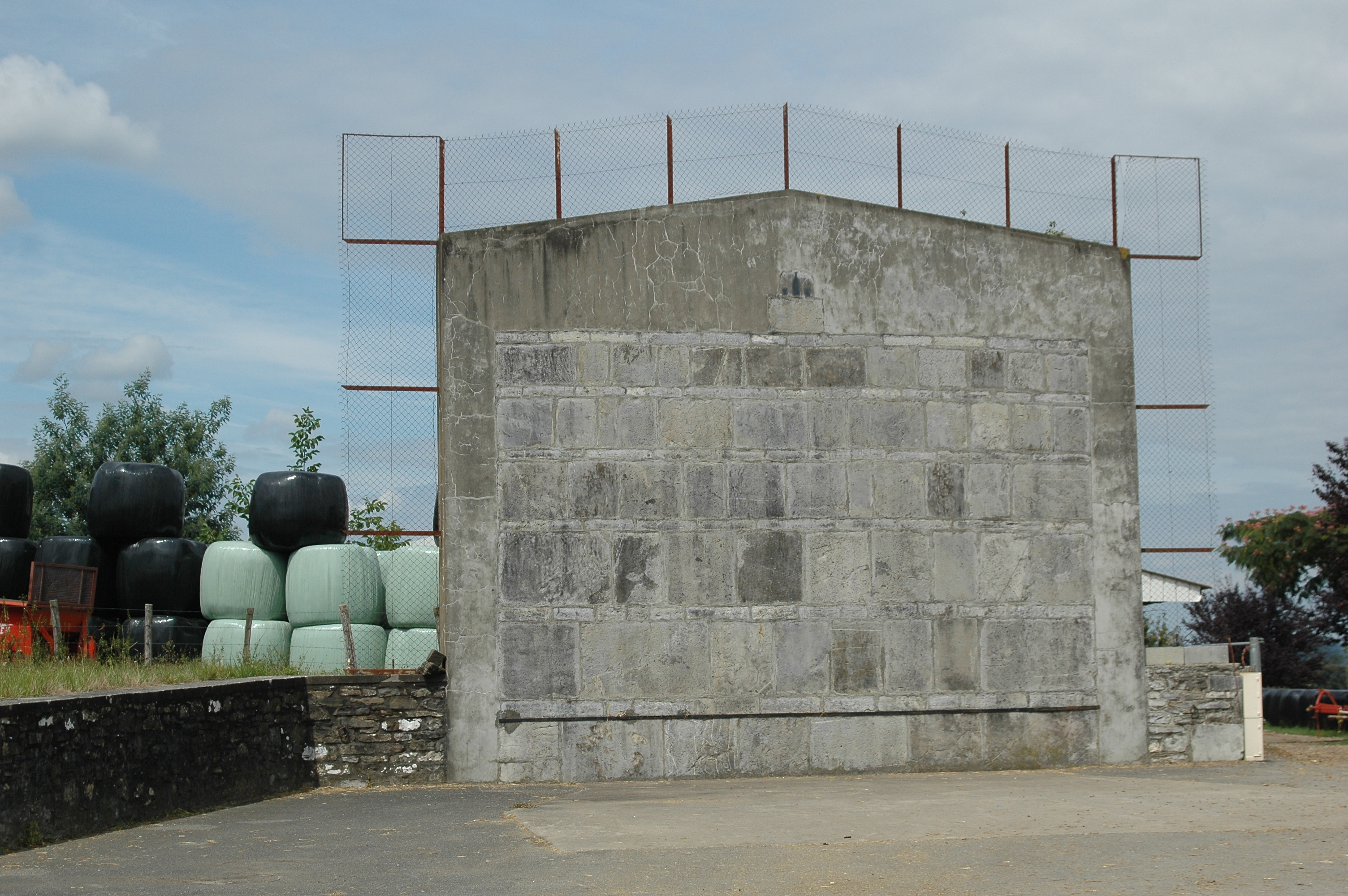
The fronton

List of Successive Mayors

From	To	Name
2001	2014	Marc Arrachou
2014	2026	Christine Erdozaincy-Etchart

=== Inter-communality ===
Arhansus is part of seven inter-communal structures:

- the Communauté d'agglomération du Pays Basque;
- the AEP association of Ostabaret;
- the Energy association of Pyrénées-Atlantiques;
- the inter-communal association for the single purpose of Oztibarre Garbi;
- the inter-communal association for the development and management of the slaughterhouse at Saint-Jean-Pied-de-Port;
- the association for the operation of schools in Ostibarret;
- the association to support Basque culture.

== Demography ==
Historical population

Year	Pop.	±% p.a.
1793	193	—
1821	171	−0.43%
1846	181	+0.23%
1872	125	−1.41%
1901	122	−0.08%
1926	115	−0.24%
1946	131	+0.65%
1962	109	−1.14%
1968	95	−2.27%

Year	Pop.	±% p.a.
1975	102	+1.02%
1982	97	−0.72%
1990	98	+0.13%
1999	81	−2.09%
2007	72	−1.46%
2012	71	−0.28%
2017	74	+0.83%
2023	66	−1.89%

Source: EHESS and INSEE

== Economy ==
Economic activity is mainly agricultural. the commune is part of the Appellation d'origine contrôlée (AOC) zone of Ossau-iraty.

== Culture and heritage ==
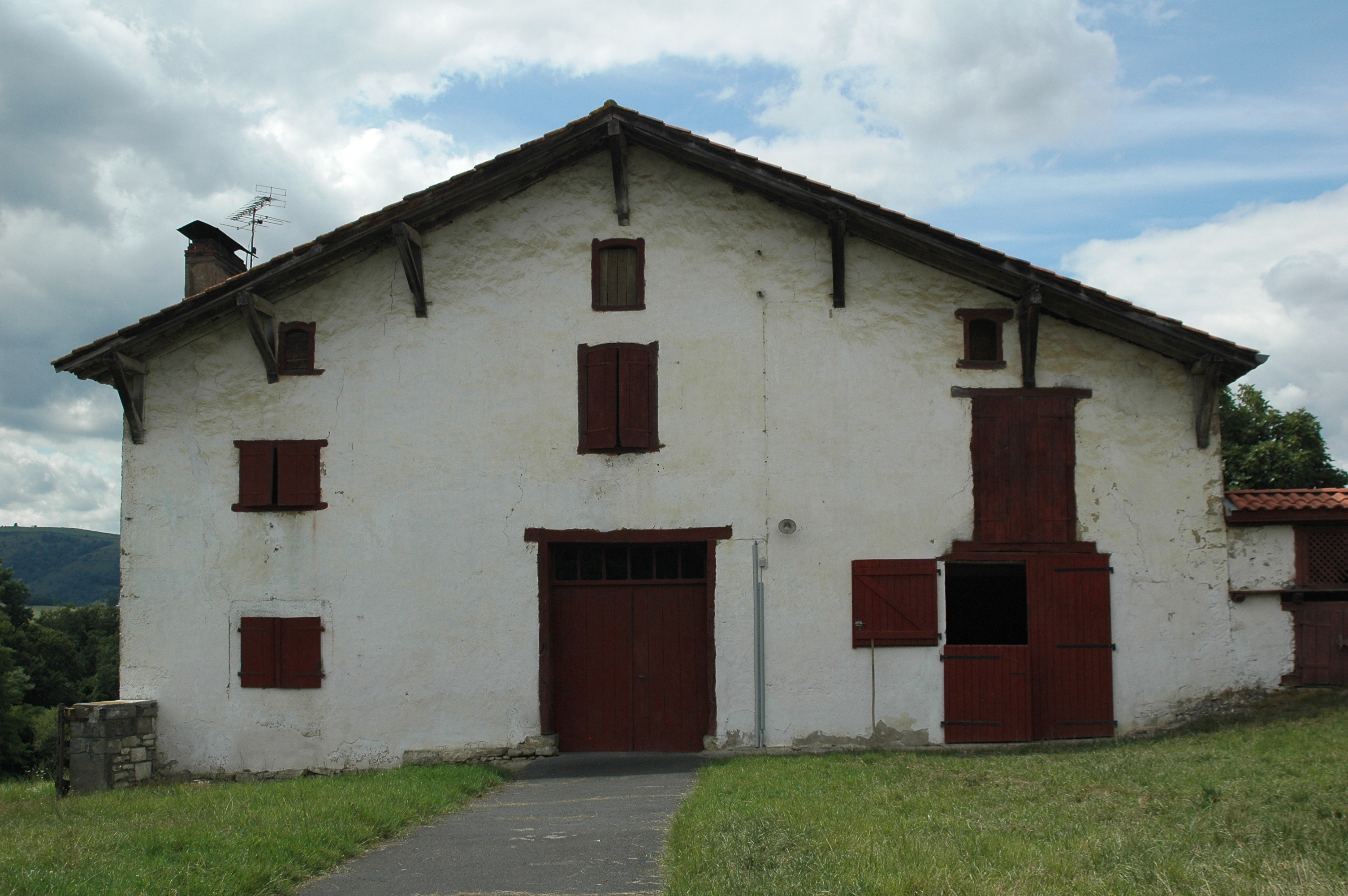
An old farm

=== Civil heritage ===
Several sites in Arhansus are registered as historical monuments:

- The Protohistoric Camp at Castellu Cahara at an altitude of 361m
- A second Protohistoric Camp at Portasanse.
- Houses and Farms (18th-19th century)

=== Religious heritage ===
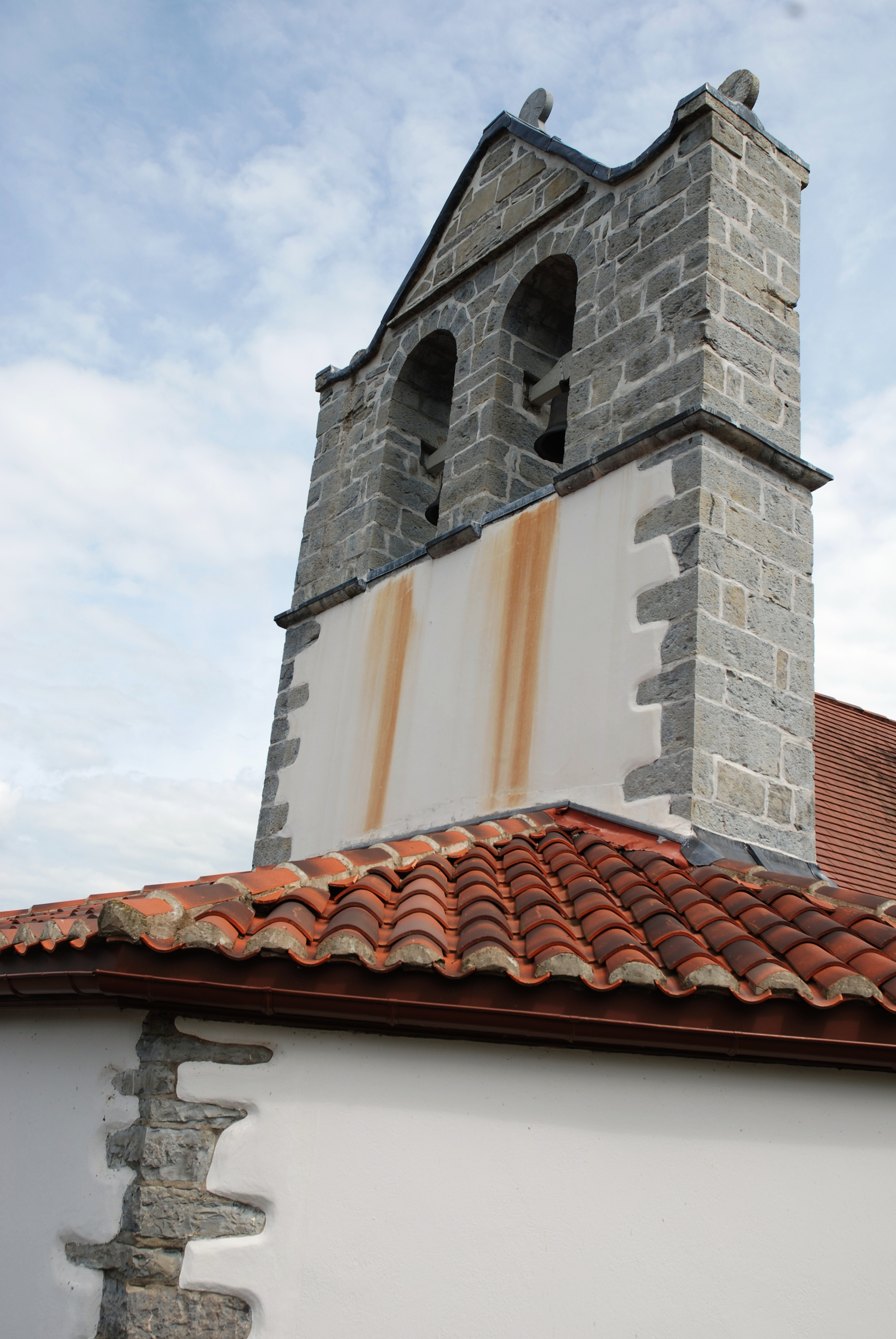
The Church of Saint-Étienne

The Parish Church of Saint-Étienne (15th century) is registered as an historical monument.

The Church

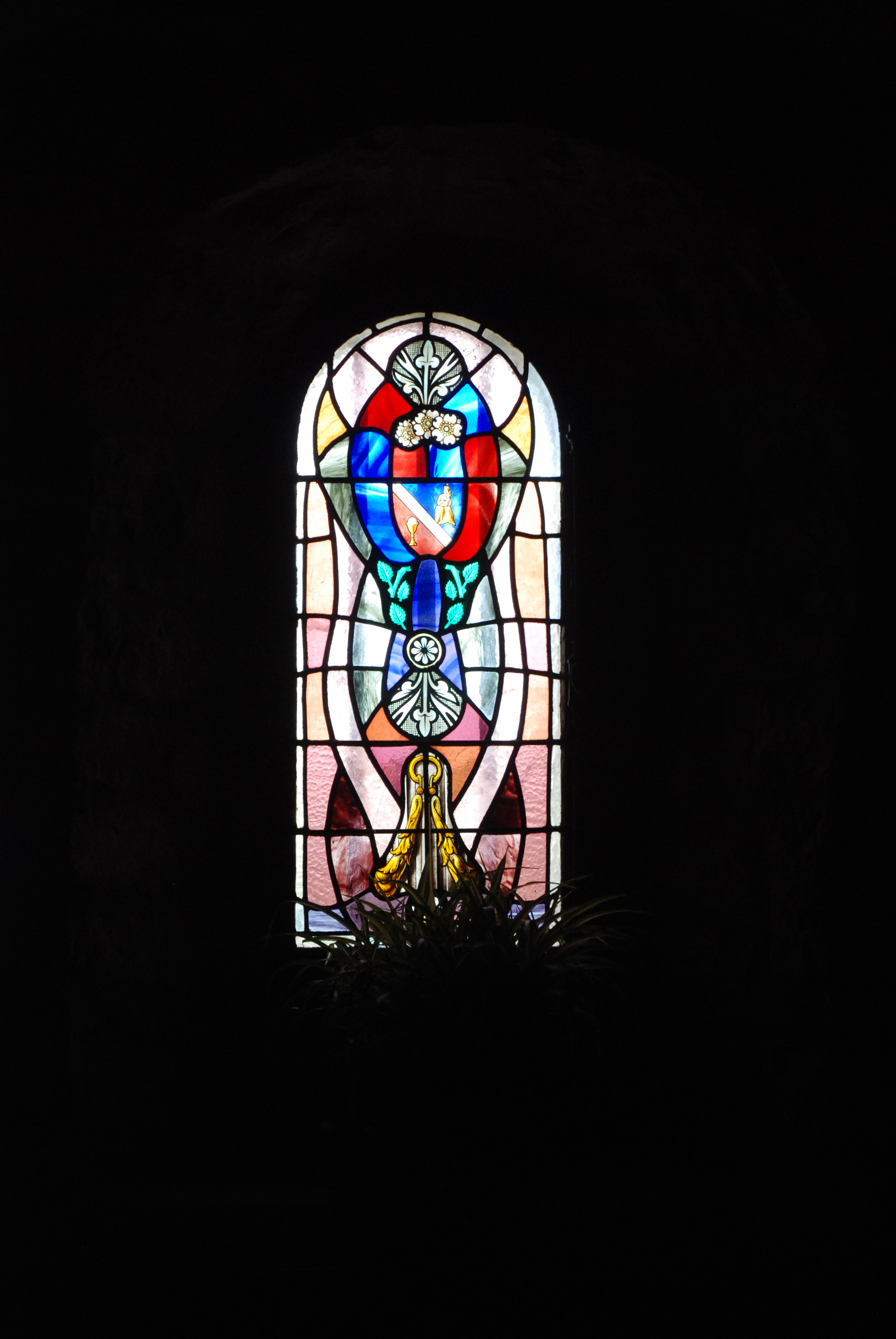
Stained Glass

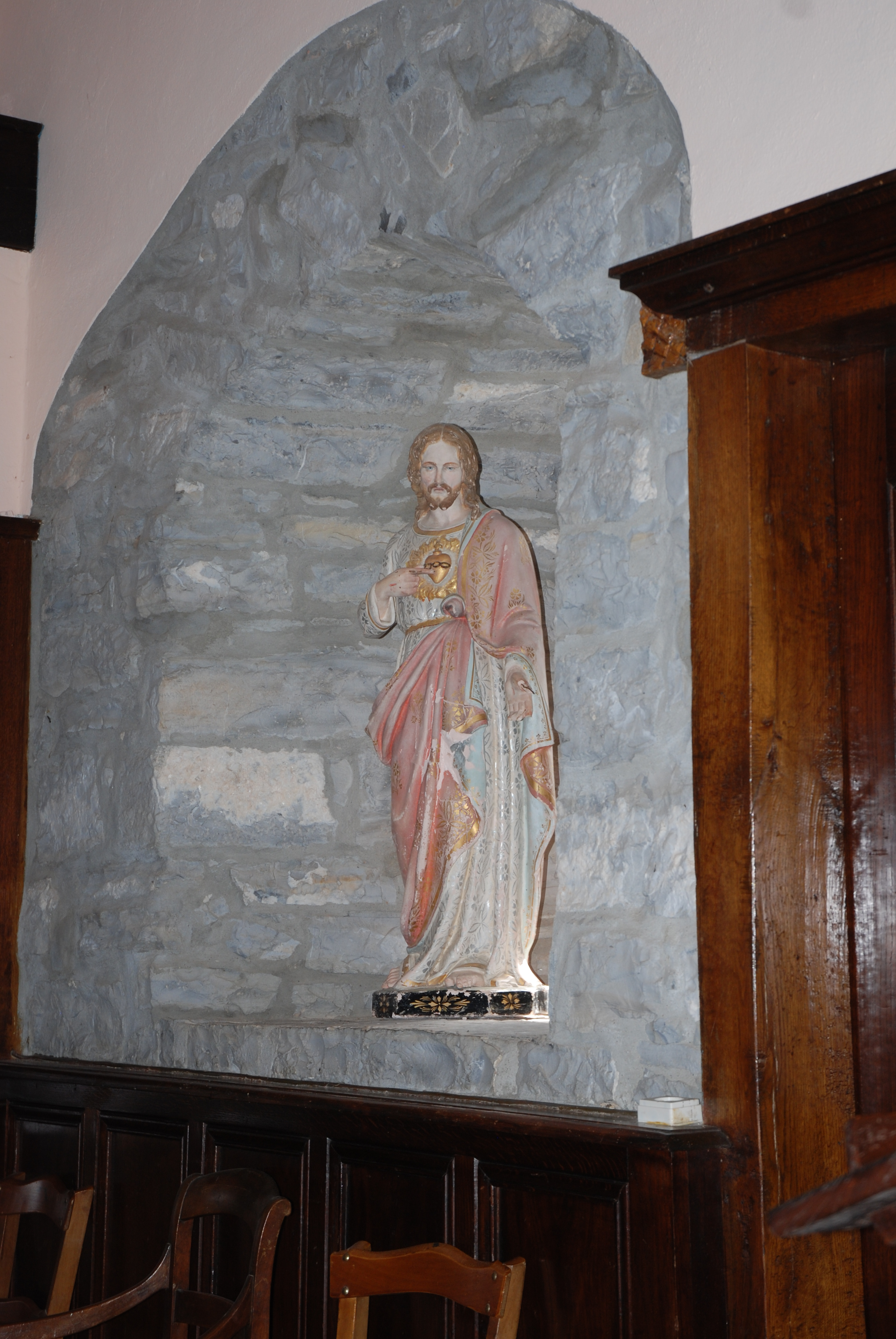
Relief

=== Hilarri in Arhansus ===
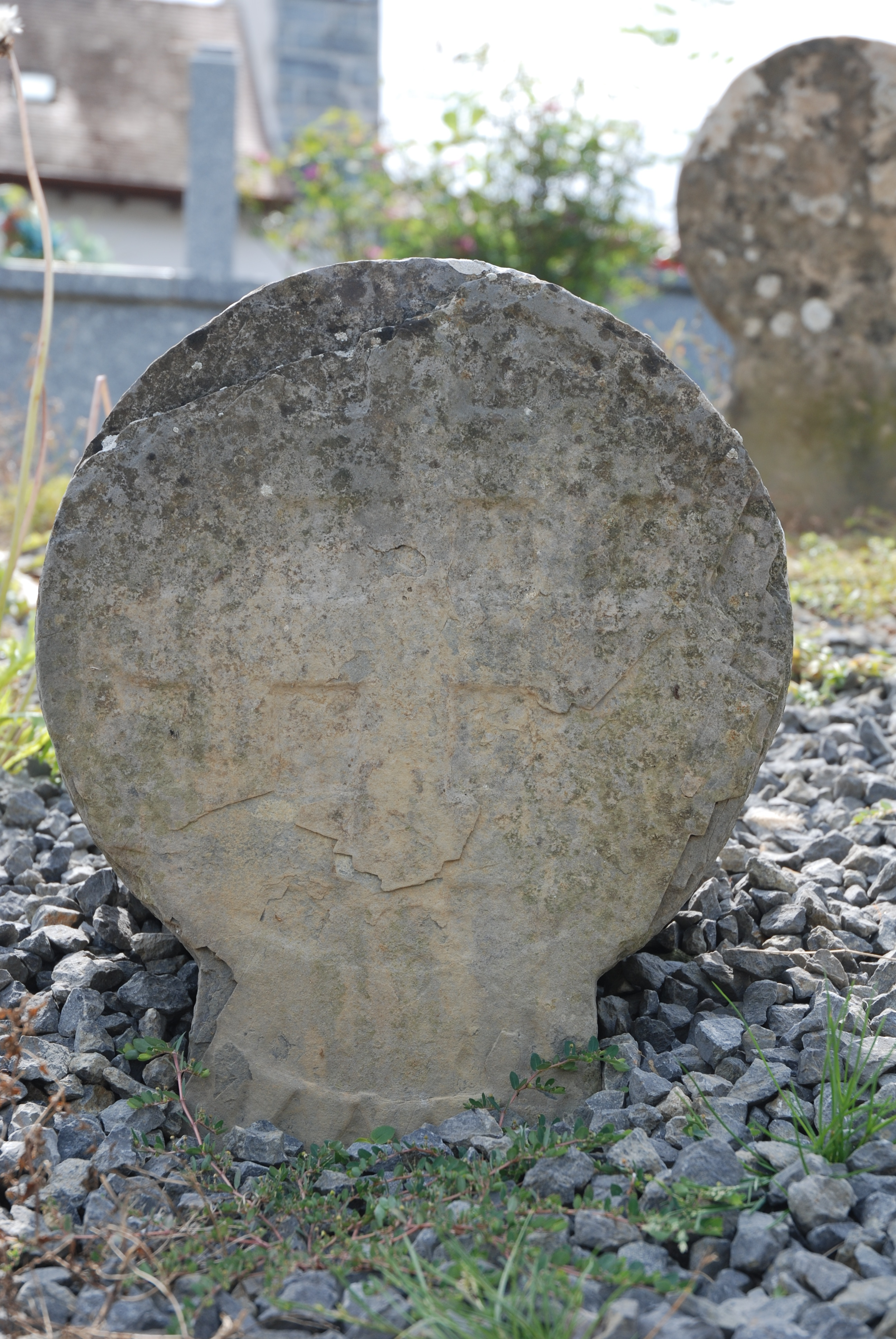

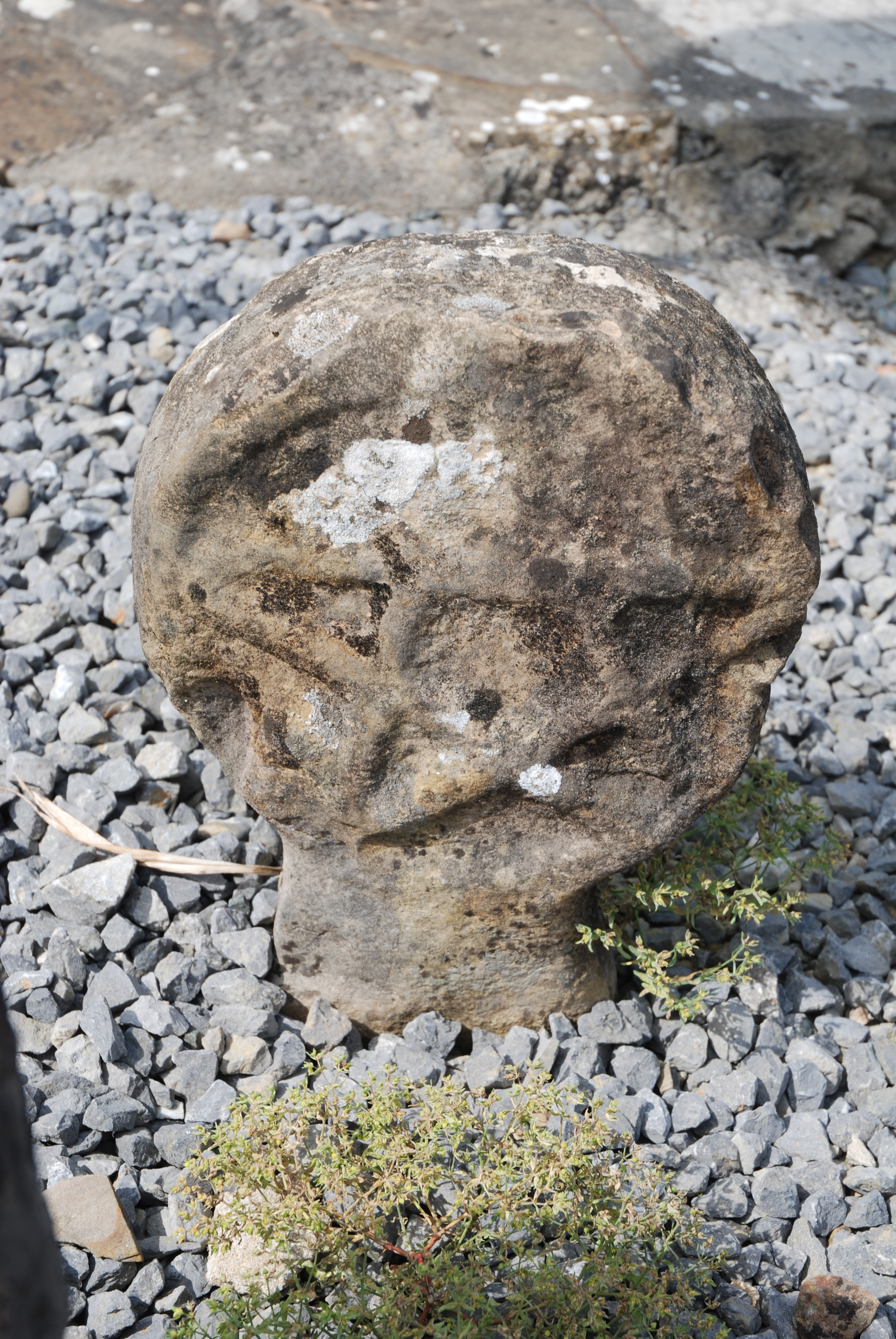

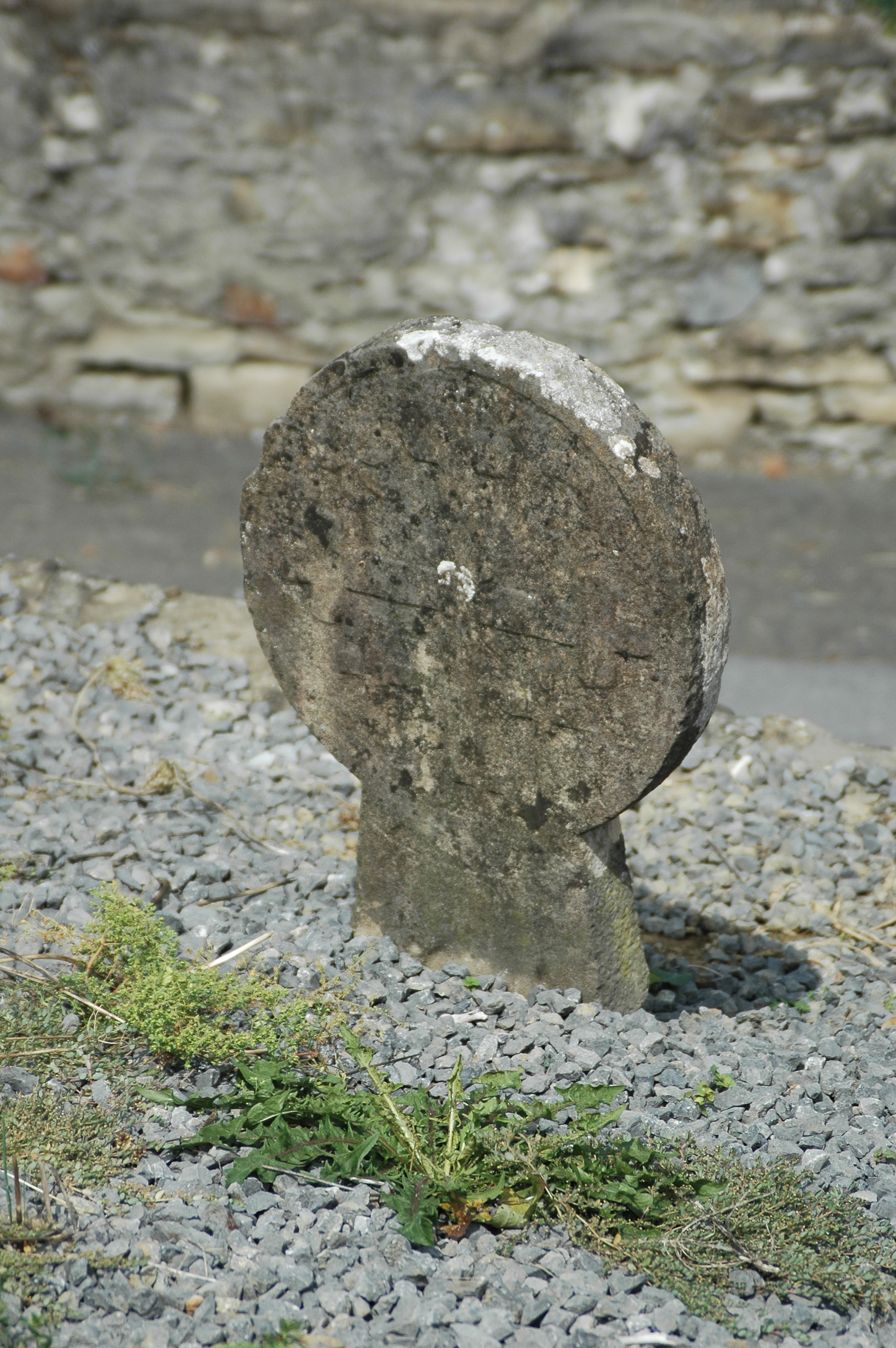

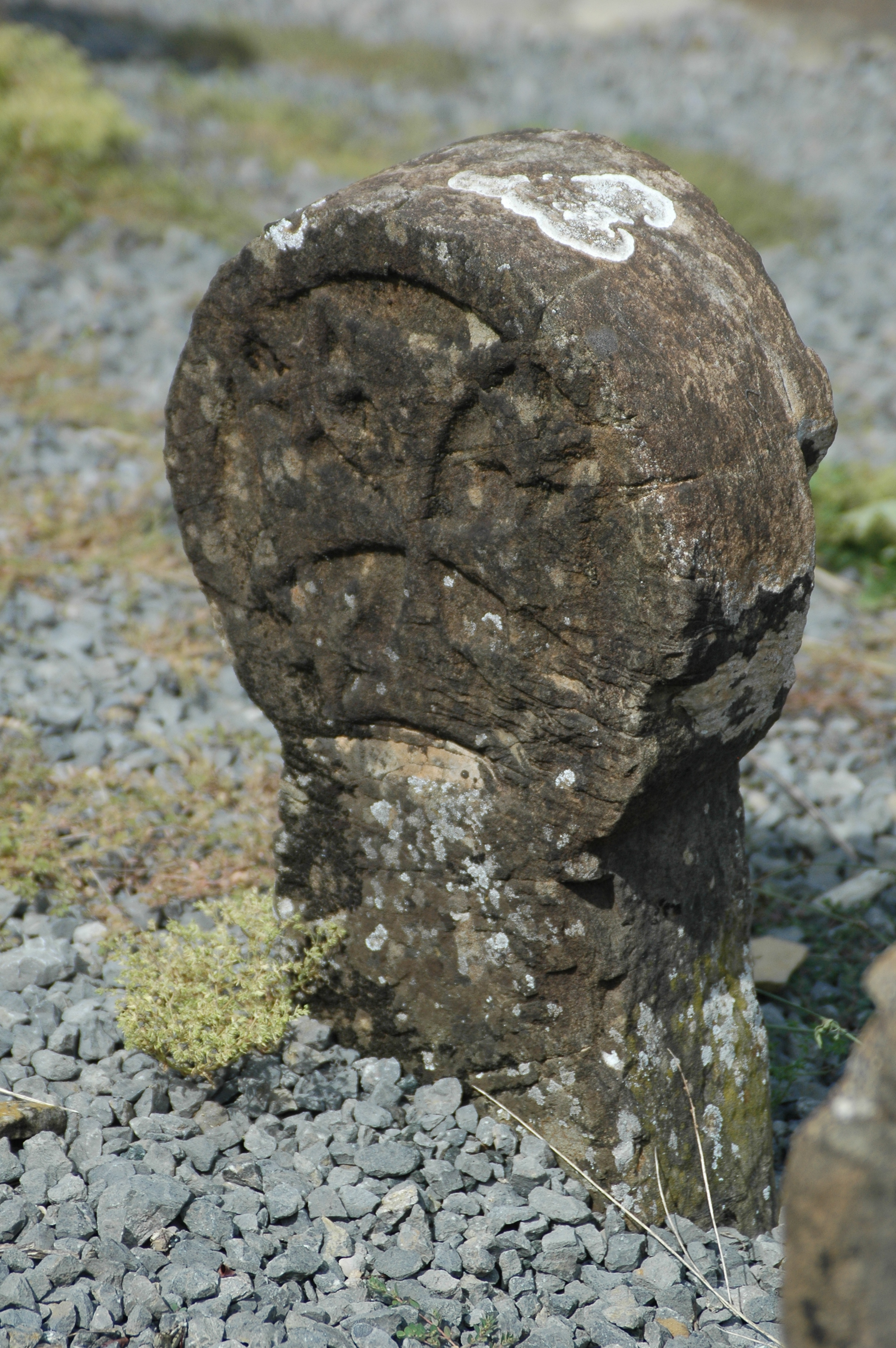

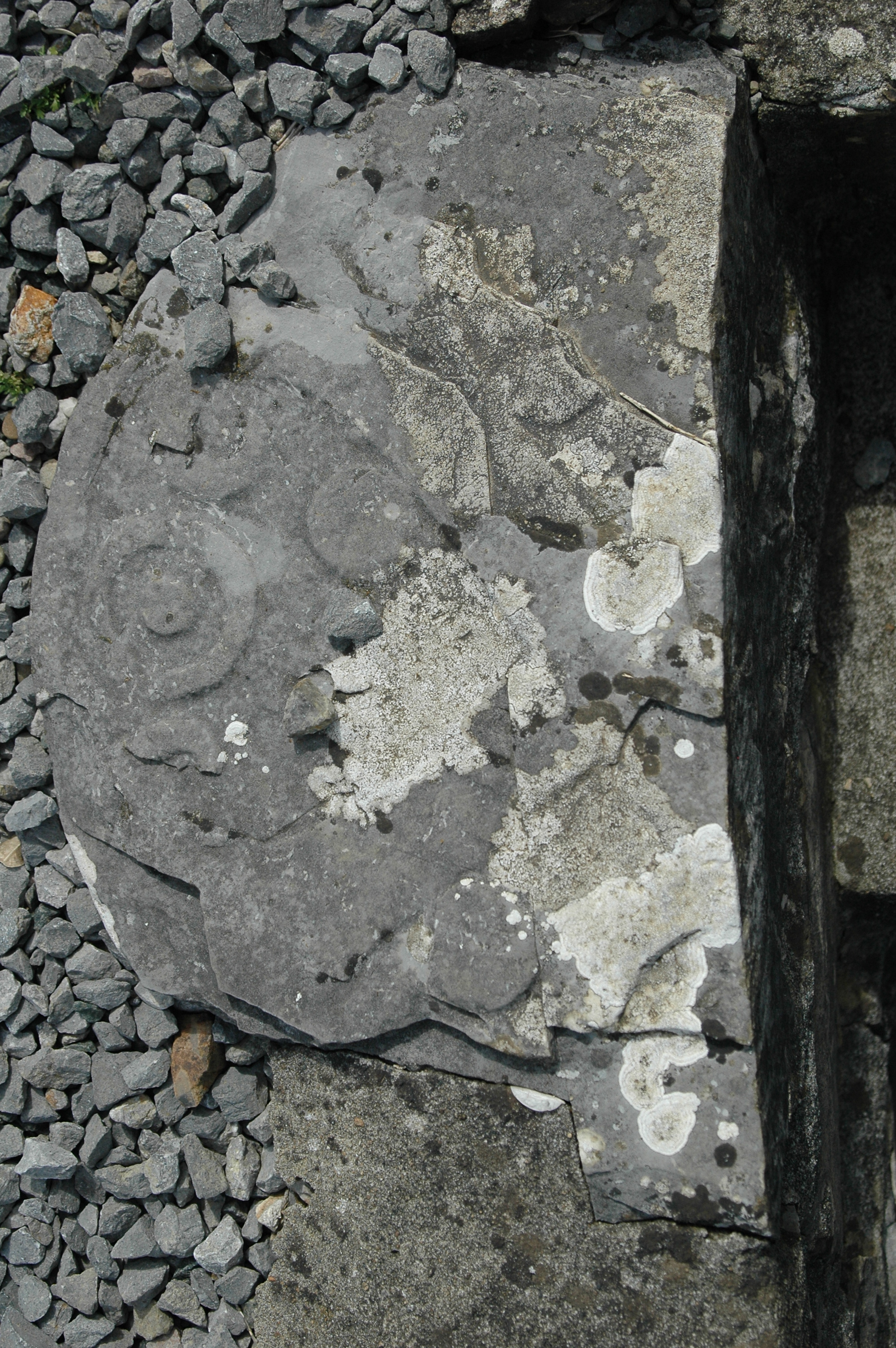

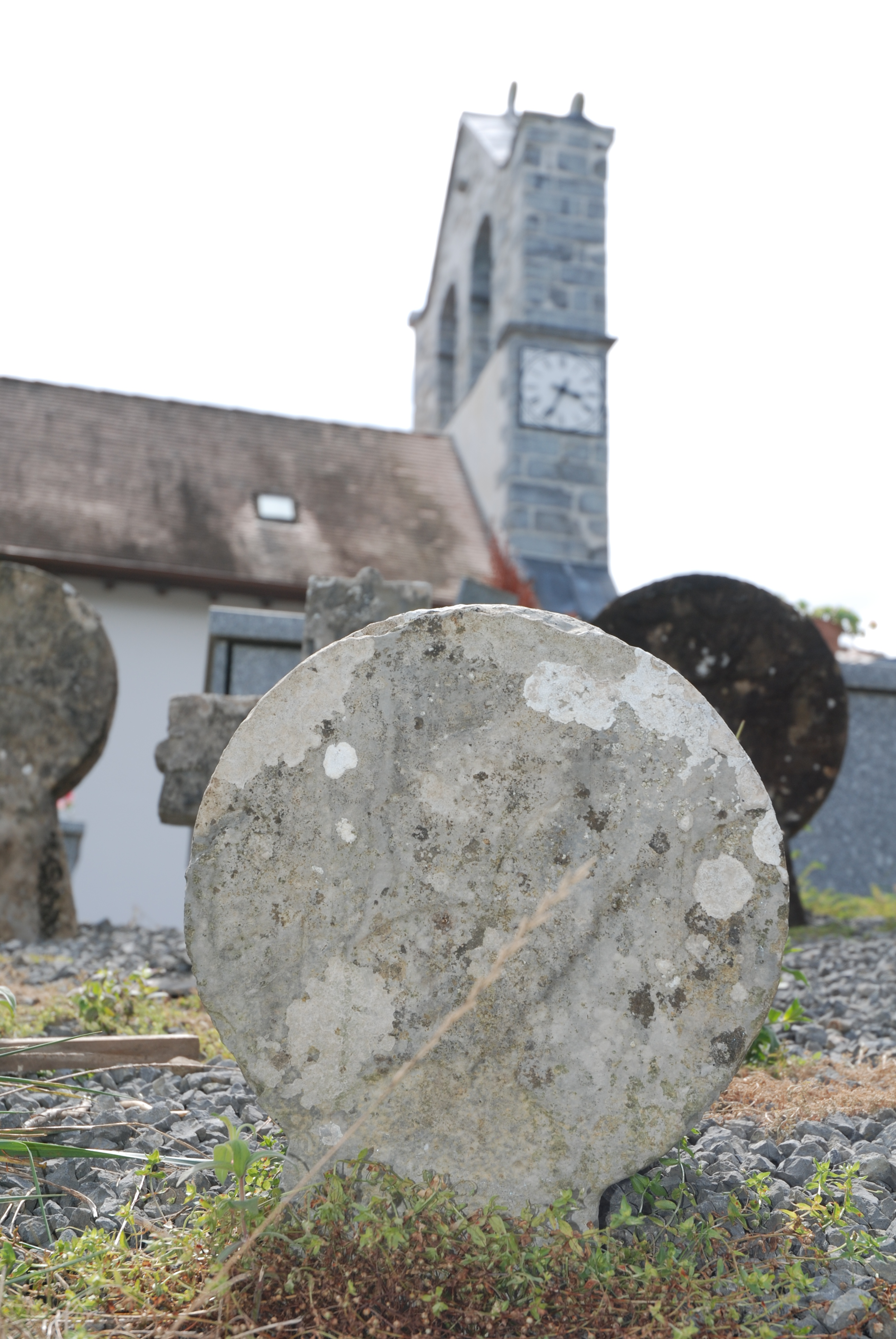

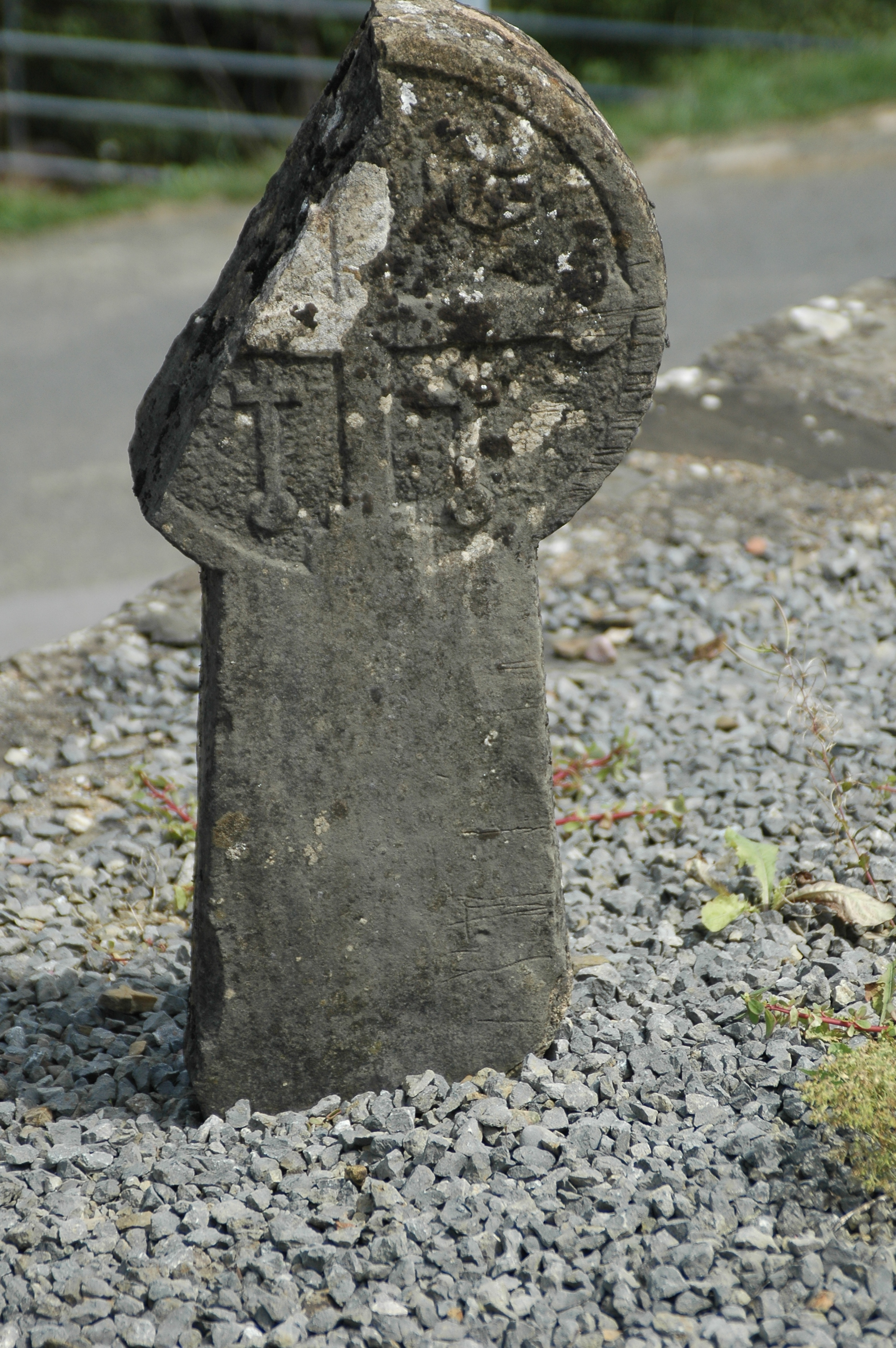

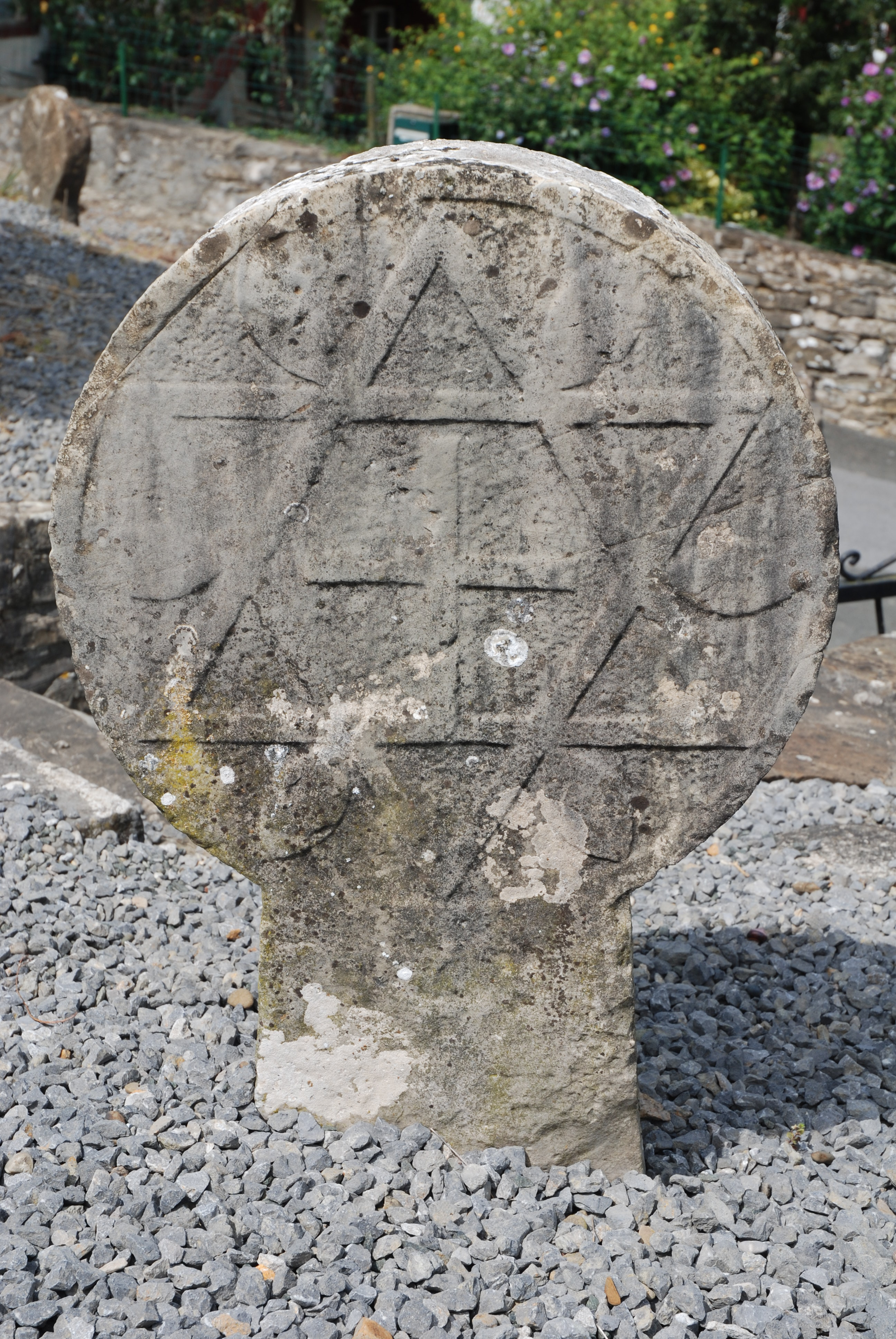

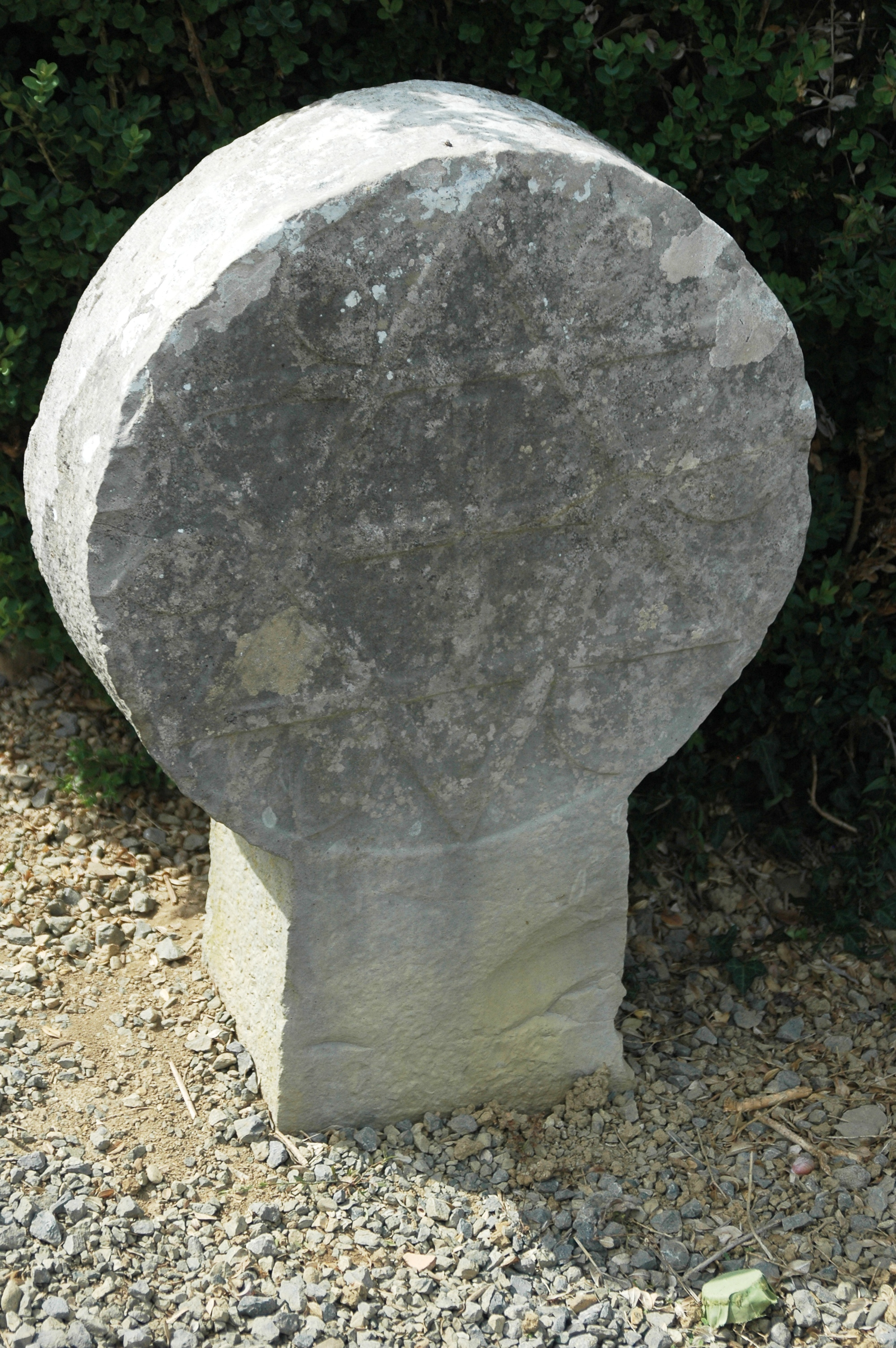

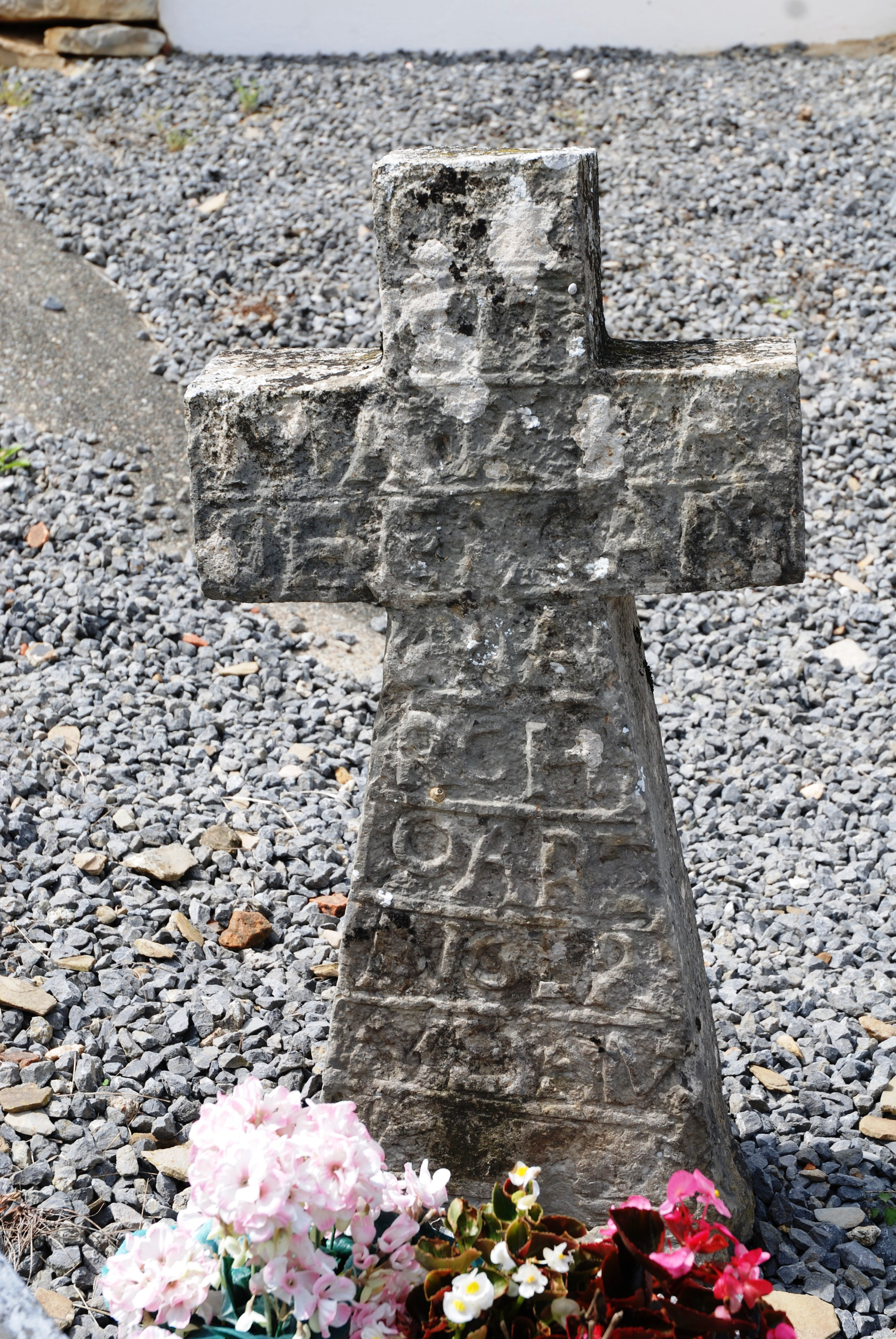

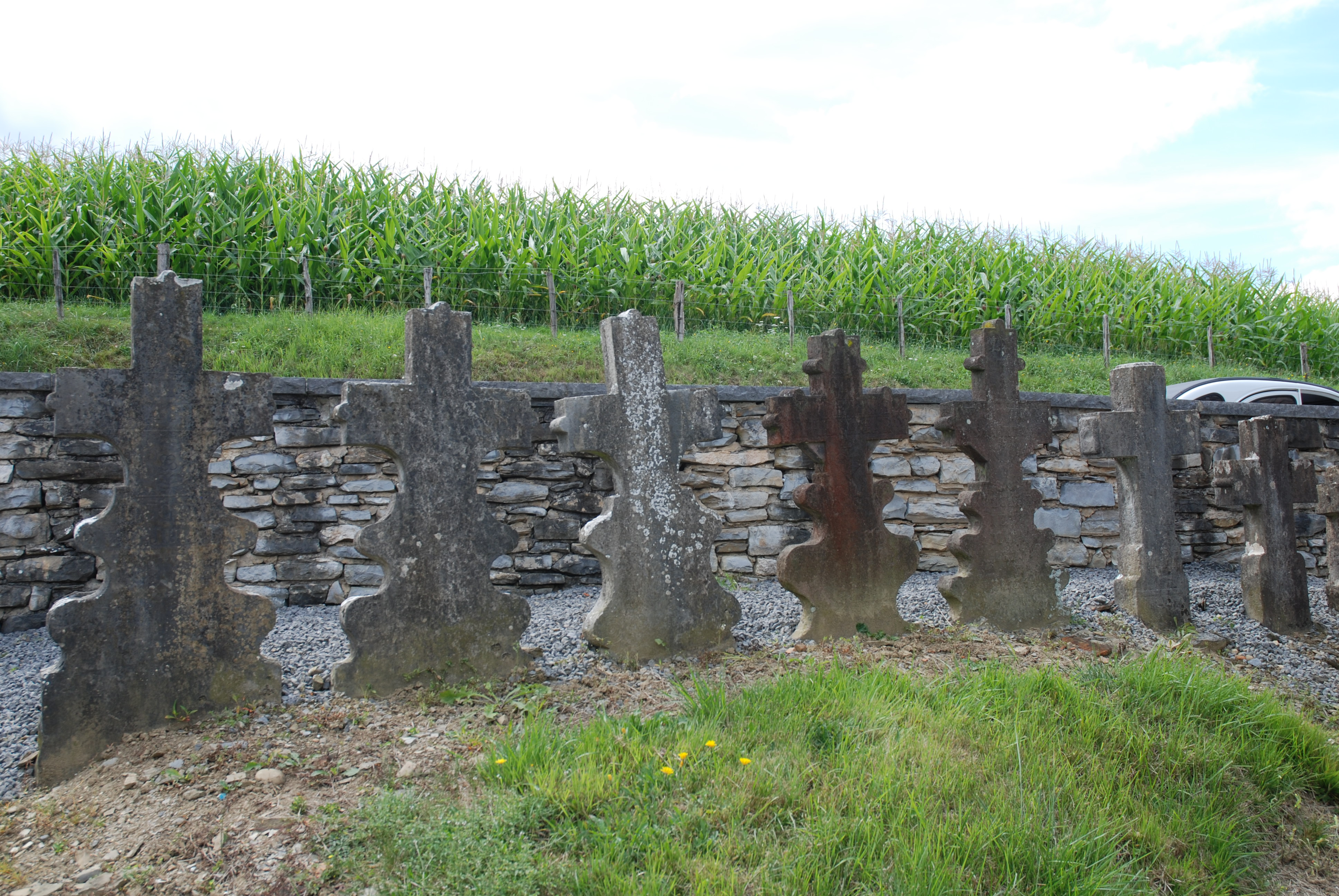

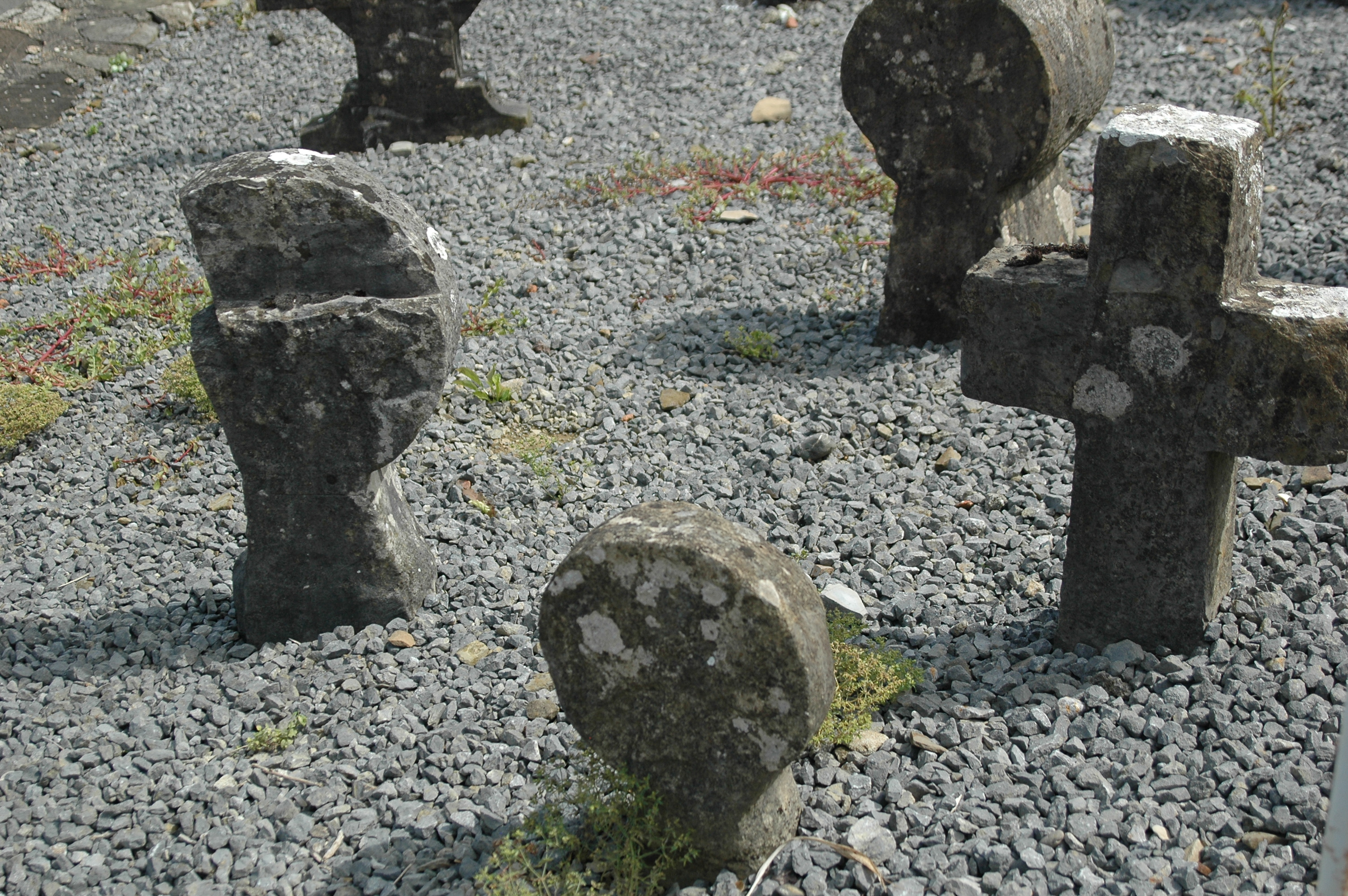

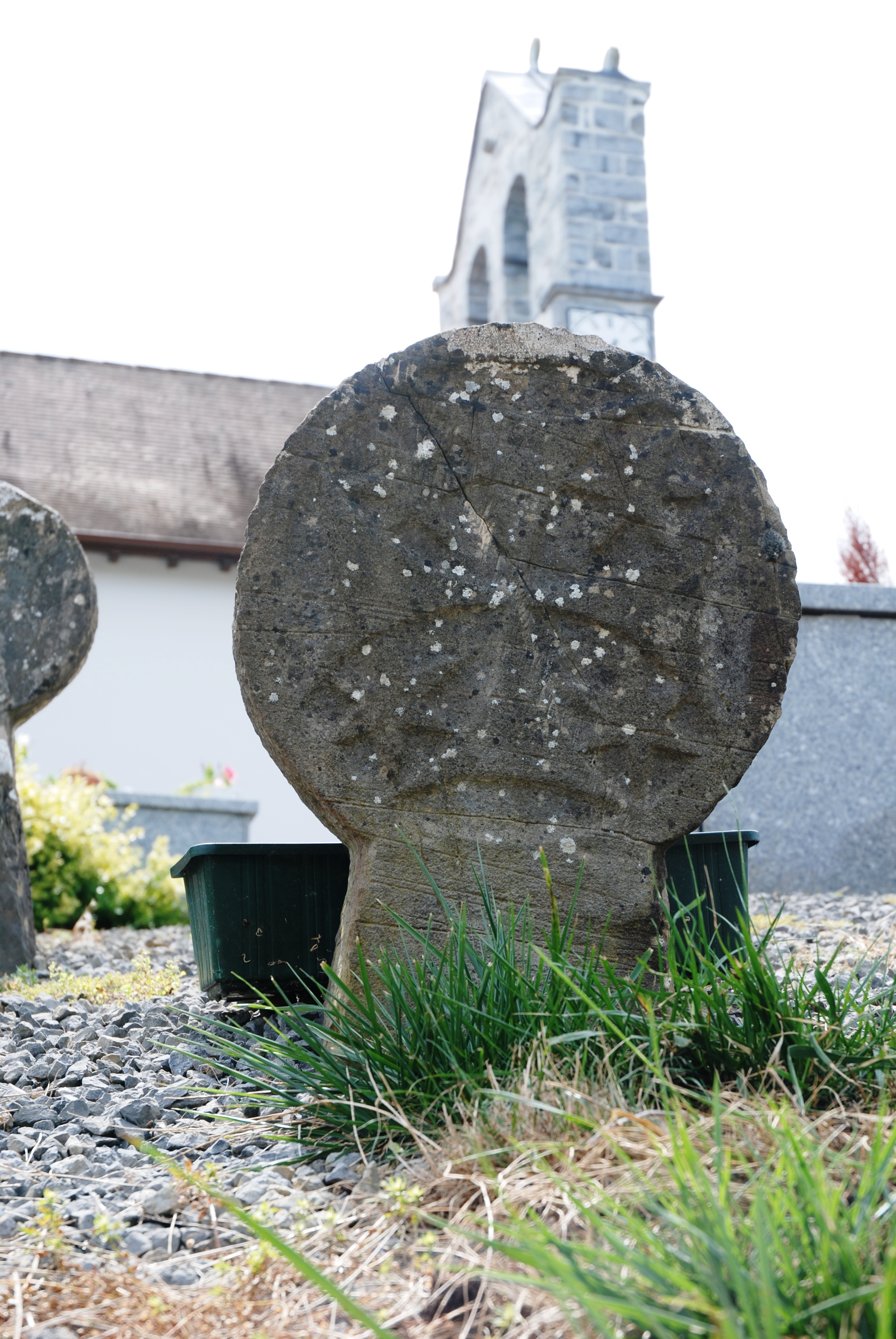

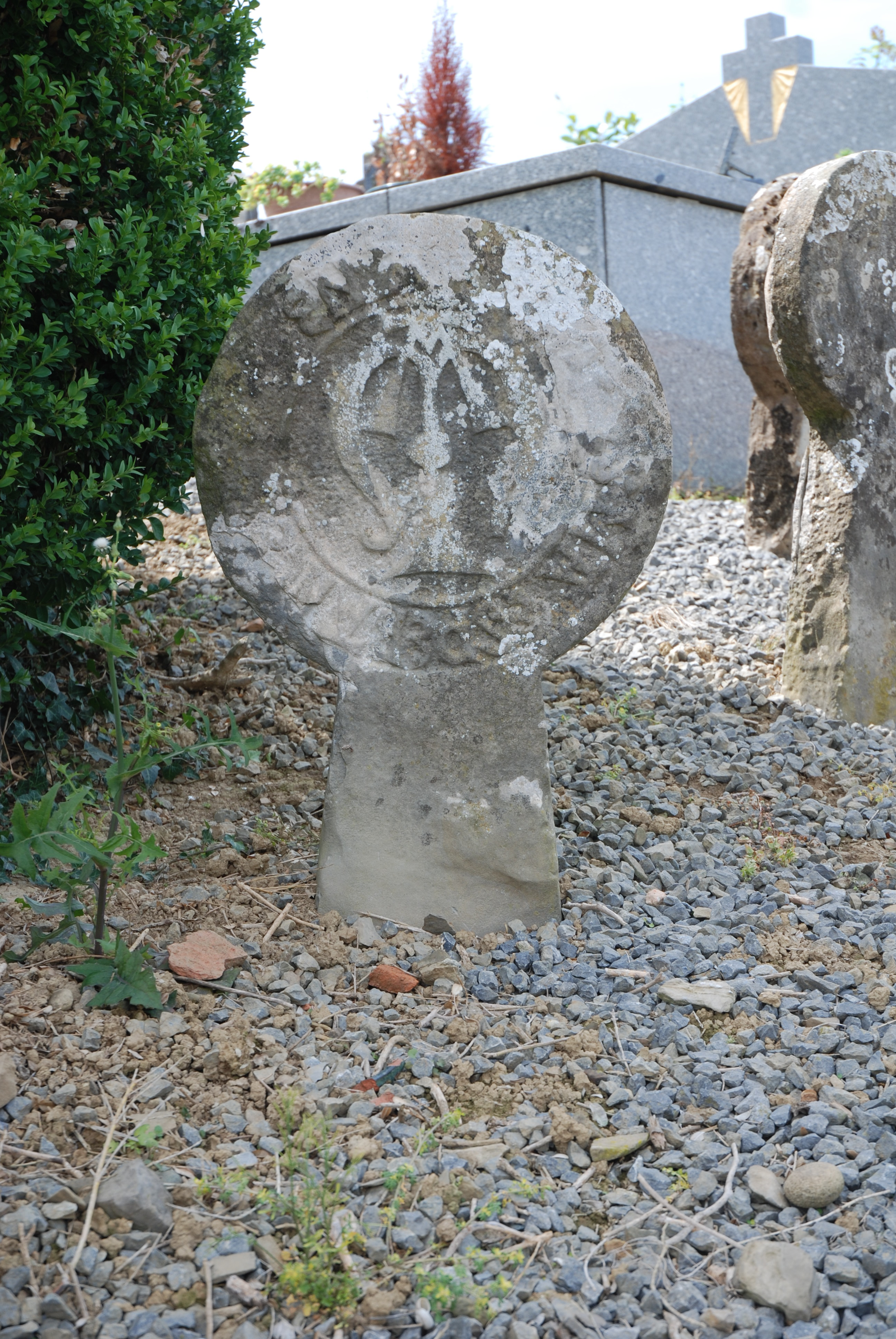

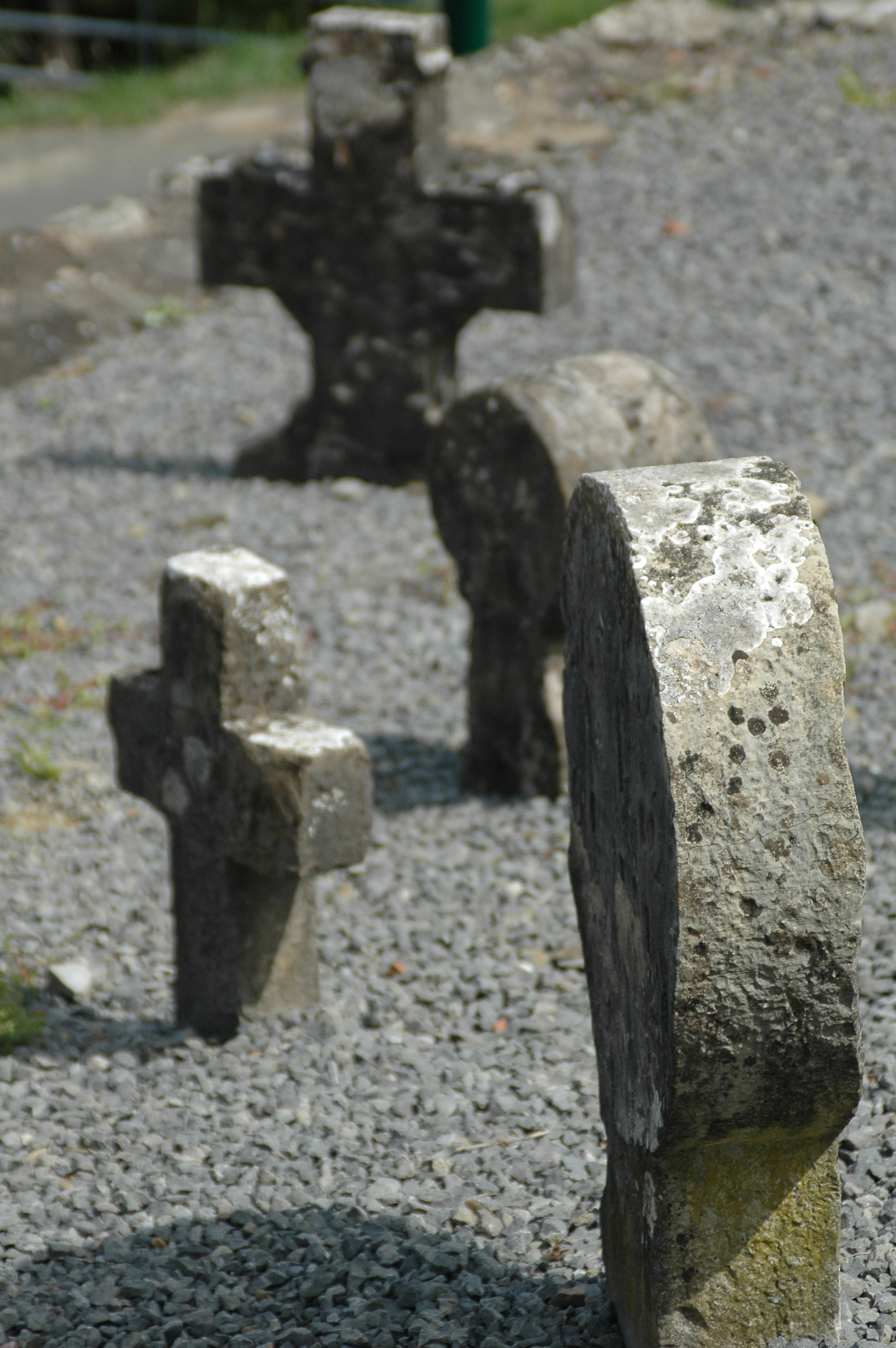

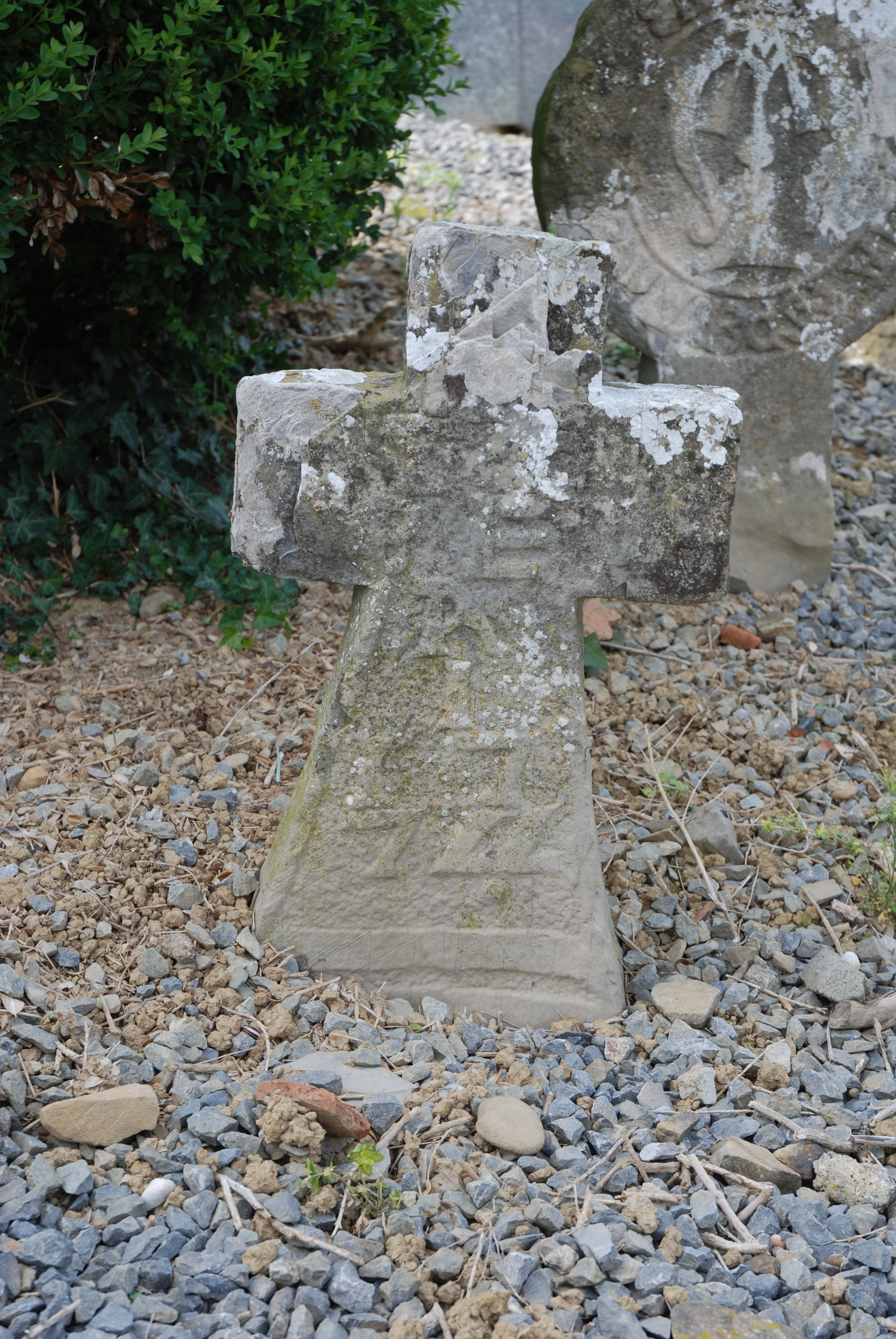

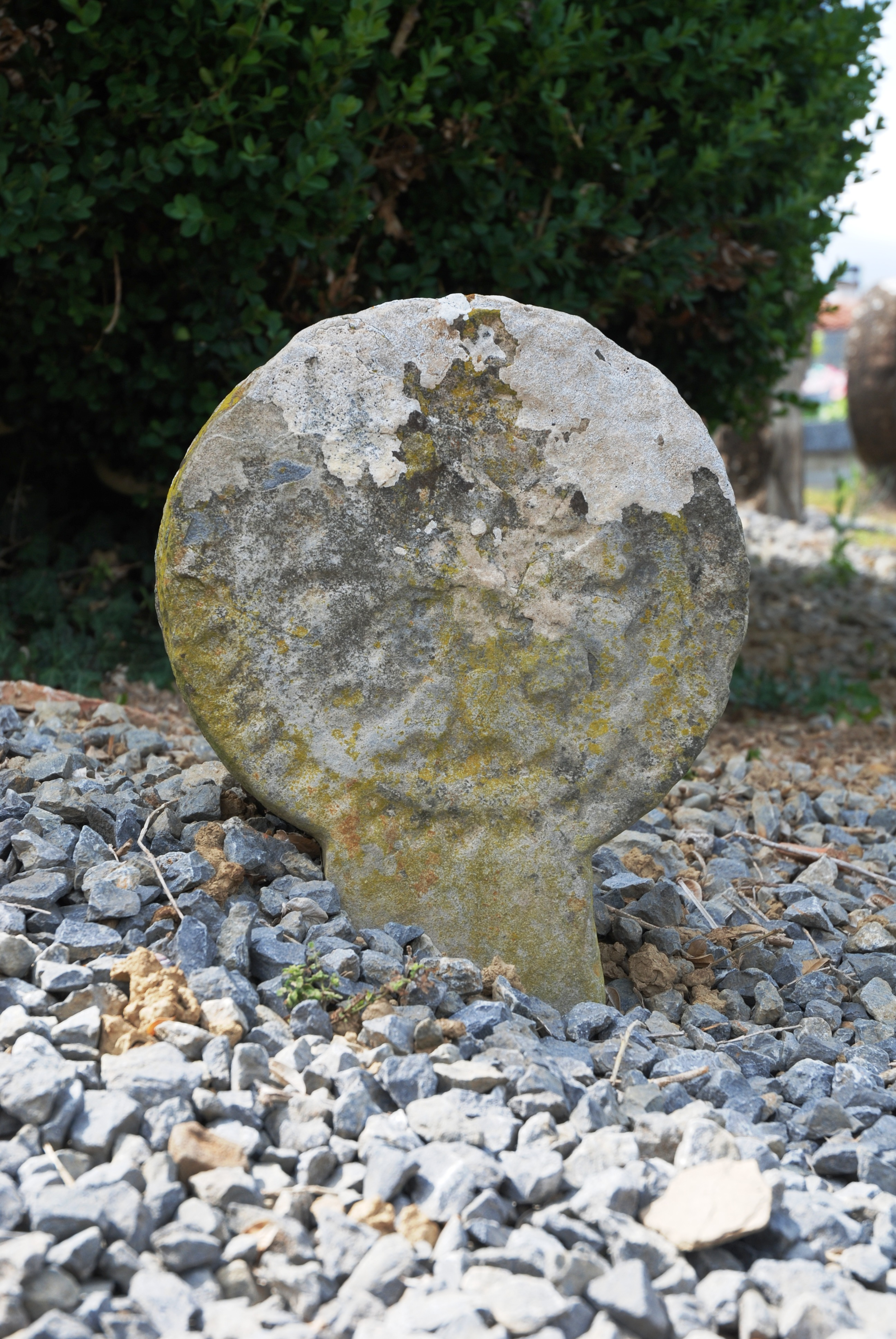

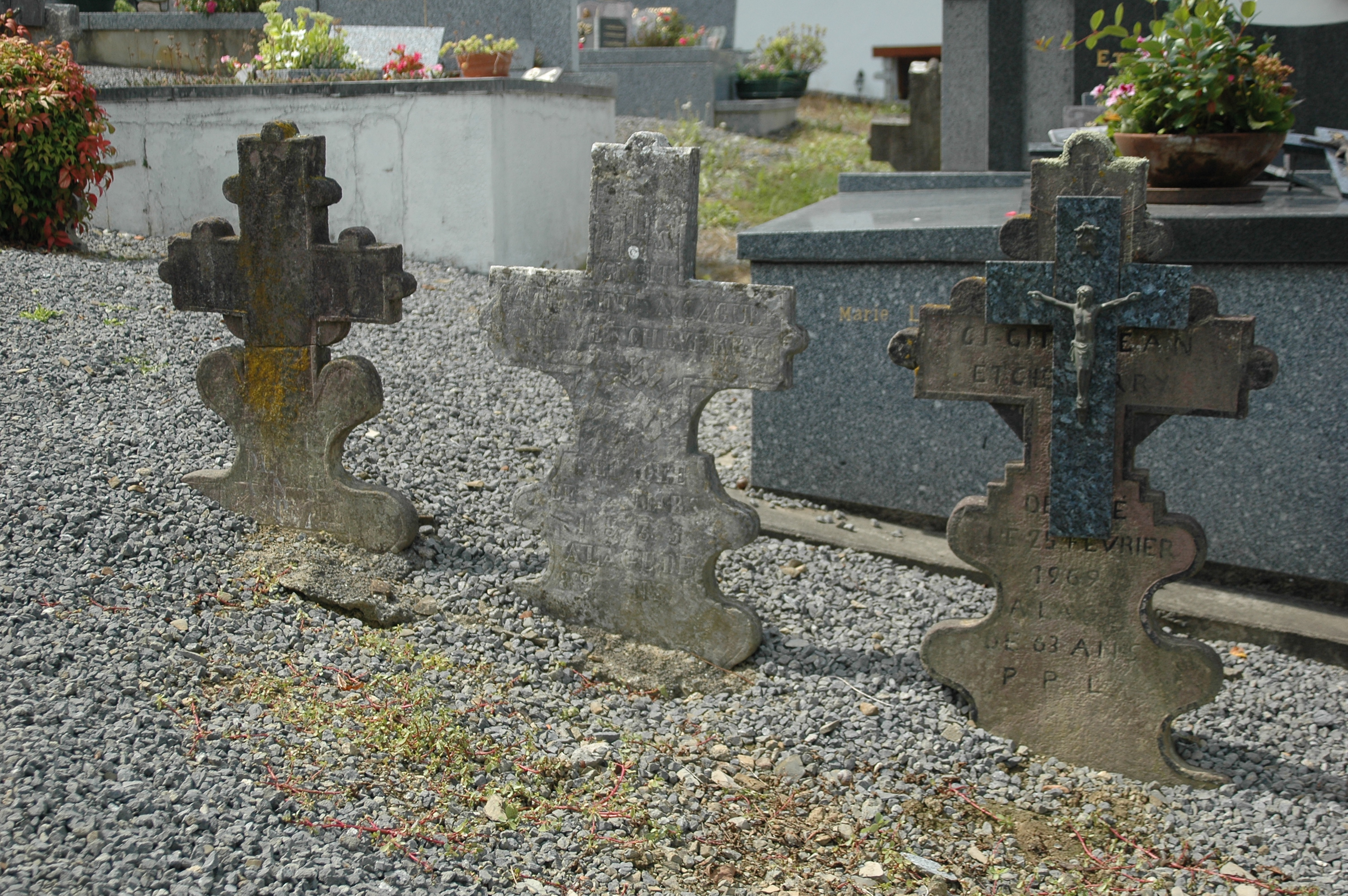

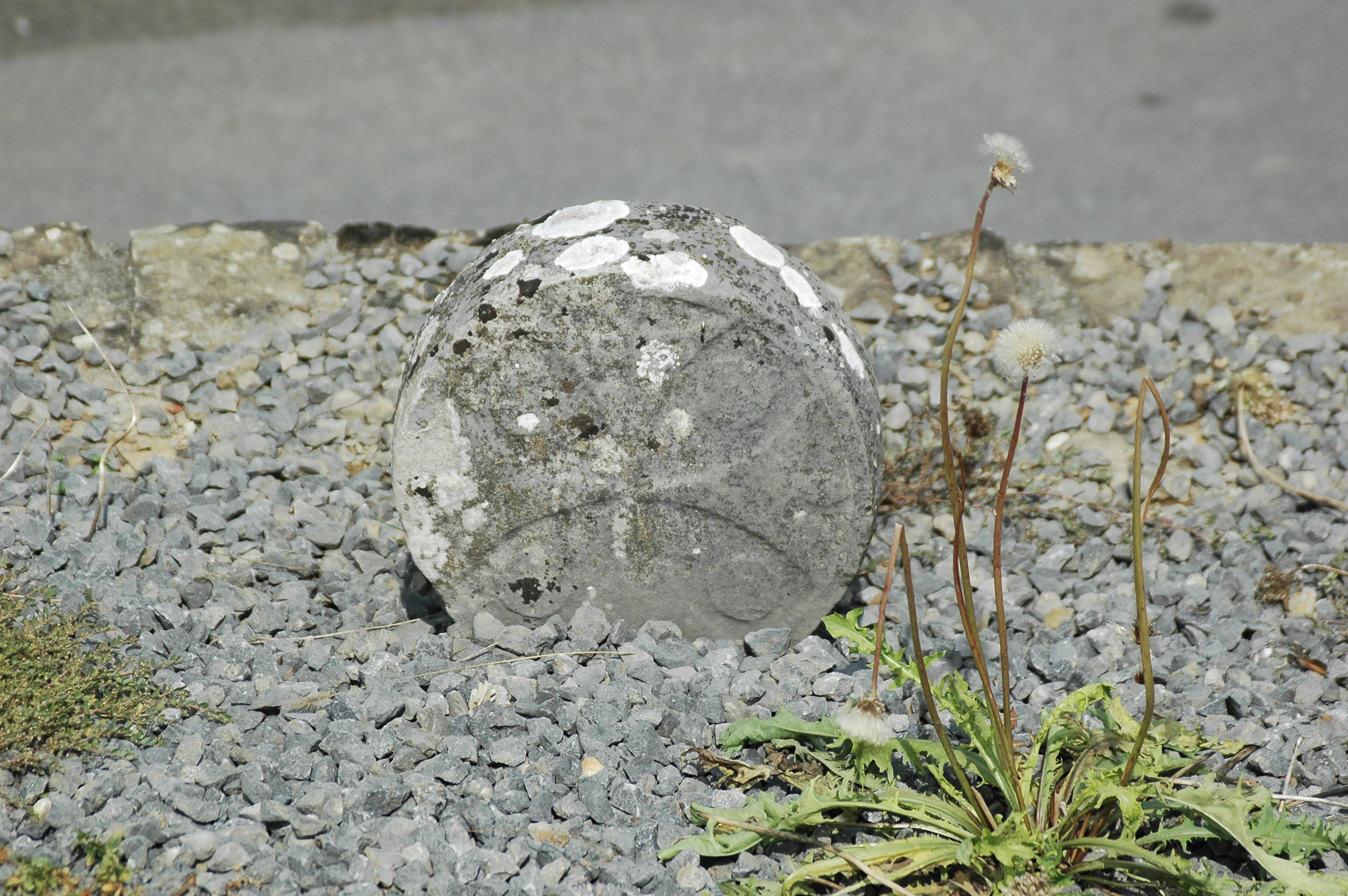

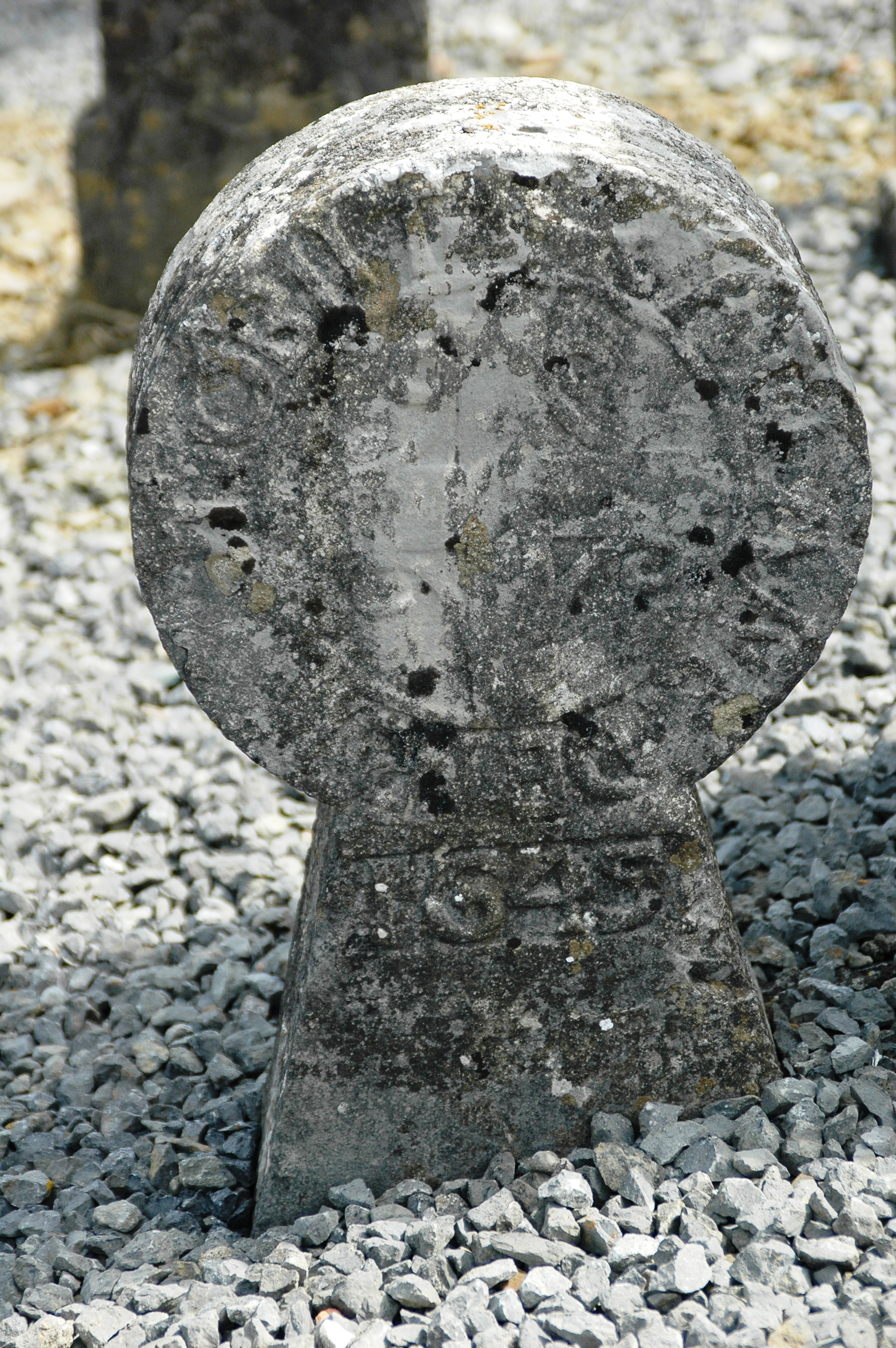

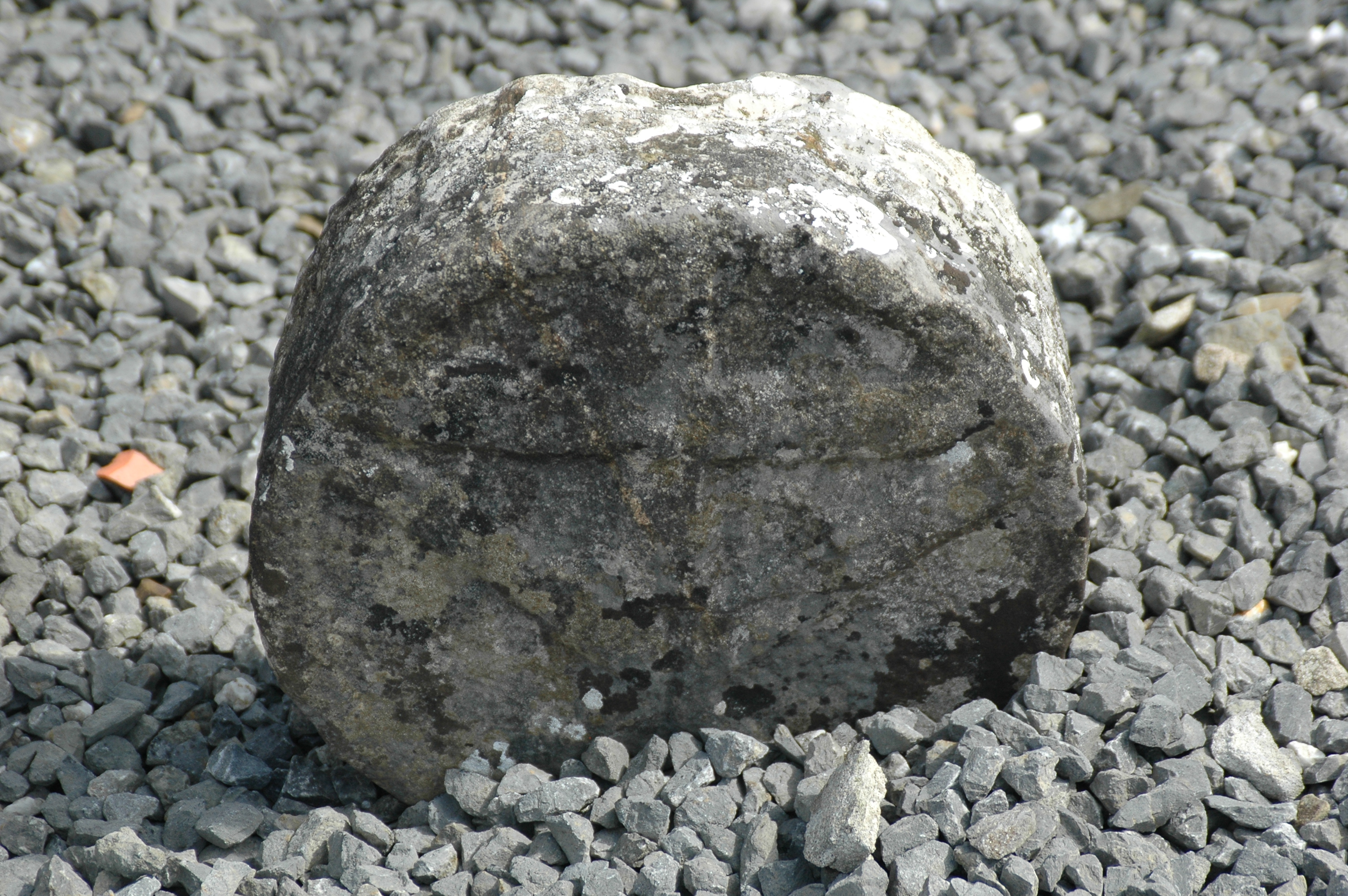

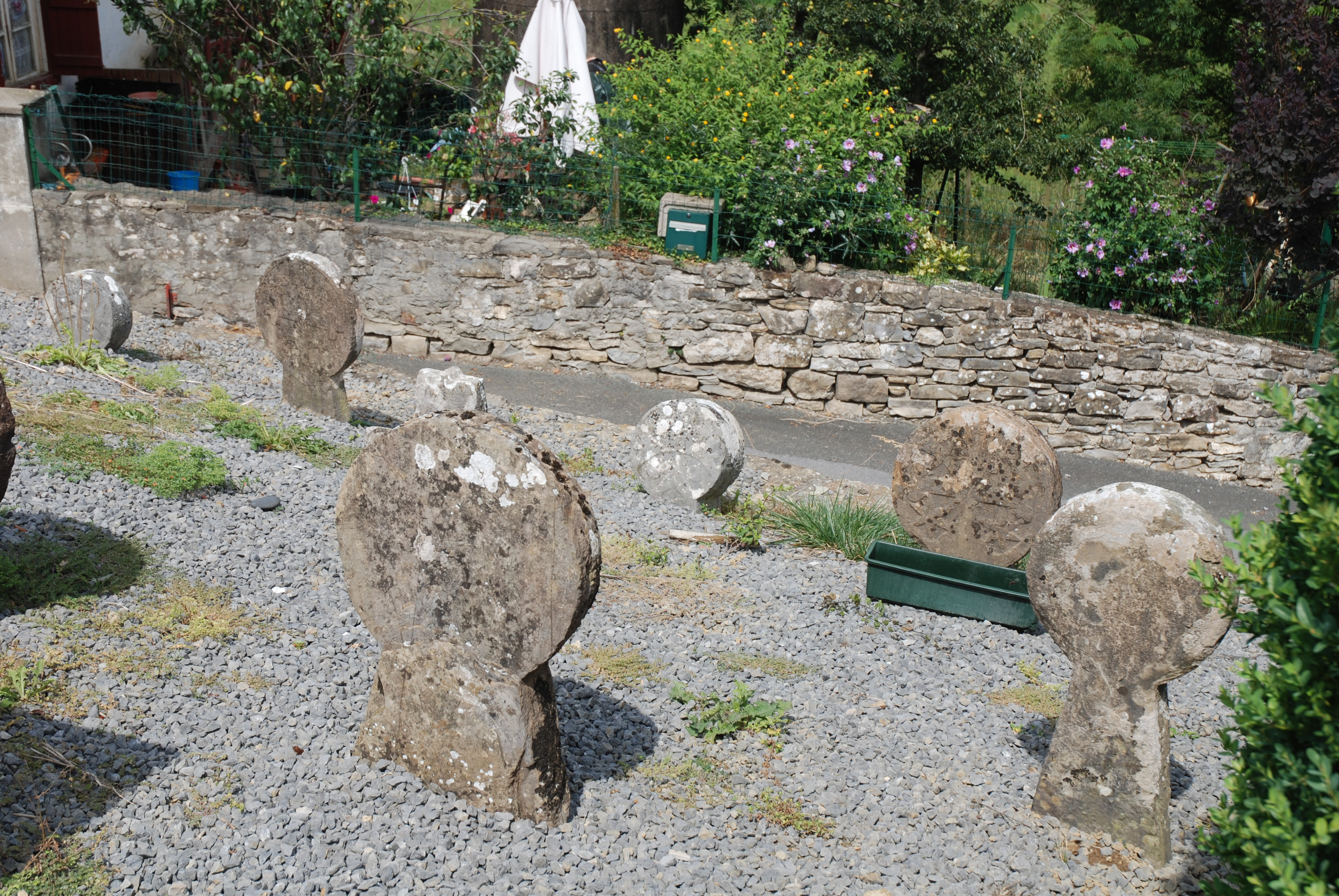

== See also ==
- Communes of the Pyrénées-Atlantiques department
