= Arhaan =

Arhaan (Devanagari: अरहान) is a name. Notable people with this name include:

- Arhaan Behll (born 1984), Indian actor
- Arhaan Khan, Indian model and film and TV actor
- Srinda Arhaan, Indian film actress
