= Rakan Daqeri =

Iranian author

Mohamed-Reza Daqer, known by his pen name Rakan Daqeri (Persian: راکان داغری), is an Iranian author who is currently active as one of the authors for the International Hozeyeh Mashq Publications of Iran and he was able to win the Best Arabic Book Award in 2025.

== Biography ==
Rakan Daqeri was born on July 16, 1999, in Susangerd, Khuzestan, Iran. He began writing at the age of 12, inspired by Movies and Series, and referred to writing as his eternal passion. He has stated that he initially intended to become a screenwriter, but due to the challenges of that path, he decided to shift his focus toward writing stories and novels.

== Bibliography ==
- Love Insanity: The first book, published in 2018; a romantic story about university love and the author's debut work.
- Deer: This book, published in 2022 in collaboration with several other authors, is a collection of short sentences.
- Mafia Ambiguity: The first Arabic book, published in 2025; a gripping crime novel about the mysteries of the mafia.

== Awards ==
- While studying for his high school diploma in the Humanities stream during the third year of high school, he won the Literature Olympiad award.
- In 2025, following the publication of his Arabic book Mafia Ambiguity, he received the Best Arabic Book of the Year award from the International Hozeyeh Mashq Publications of Iran.
