= Lohan =

Lohan is a surname. Notable people with the surname include:

- Aliana Lohan (born 1993), American fashion model and former television personality, singer and actress
- Brian Lohan (born 1971), Irish sportsman
- Dina Lohan (born 1962), television personality and occasional actress
- Frank Lohan (born 1974), Irish sportsperson
- Lindsay Lohan (born 1986), American actress and pop singer
- Michael Lohan (born 1960), ex-husband of Dina Lohan and the father of Lindsay, Michael Lohan Jr., Ali, and Cody Lohan
- Neddy Lohan (died 1820), Irish captain of the Whiteboys
- Sinéad Lohan, Irish singer and songwriter of folk music and folk-inspired popular music

== Other uses ==
- Arhat, luohan or lohan in Chinese contexts
- Lohan, Pakistan, a village in the Narowal District of Punjab province
- Lohan (river), a tributary of the Crasna in Vaslui County, Romania
- Lohan (footballer) (born 1995), Brazilian footballer
- Lohan, a fictional city from the 1999 PlayStation game The Legend of Dragoon
