= Euskomedia Fundazioa =

The Euskomedia Fundazioa is a foundation established in 2002 by the Society of Basque Studies. Its principal objective is the provision of cultural and scientific material " that could be of use for people interested in Basque society and culture."

In 2008, in association with Society of Basque Studies, the Euskomedia foundation published an internet version of Joanes Leizarraga's translation of the New Testament into the Basque language.

Eusko Ikaskuntza closed the Euskomedia Foundation on July 1, 2016, and the management of all funds was transferred to Society of Basque Studies.

Since January 2018, Digital Documentation Center of Basque Studies, was made available on the Euskomedia Foundation website.
