= Amendeuix-Oneix =

Amendeuix-Oneix Amendüze-Unaso
- Commune
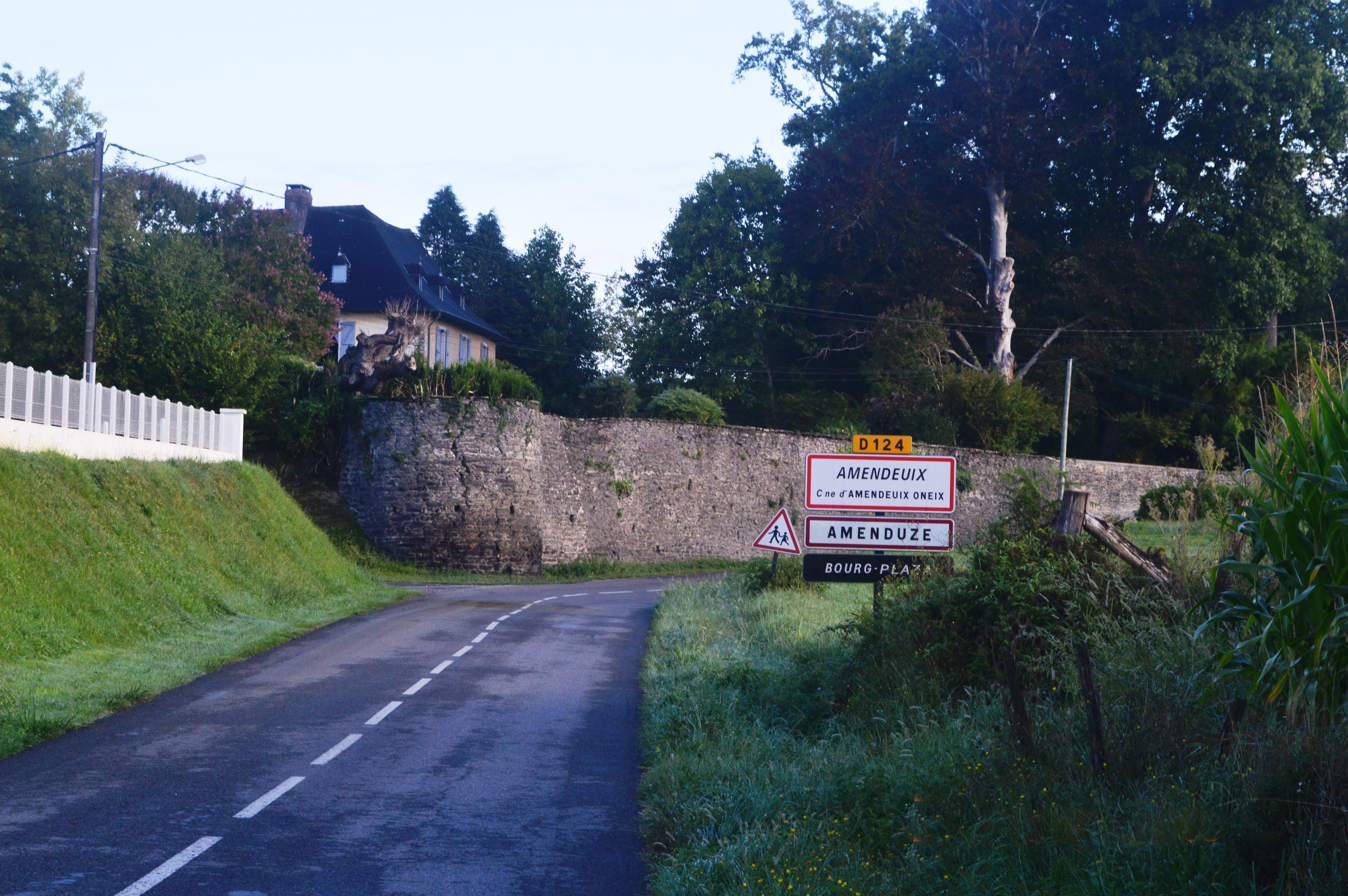
- The road into Amendeuix

- Coat of arms
- Location of Amendeuix-Oneix
- Location within France Location within Nouvelle-Aquitaine
- Coordinates: 43°21′17″N 1°02′34″W
- Country: France
- Region: Nouvelle-Aquitaine
- Department: Pyrénées-Atlantiques
- Arrondissement: Bayonne
- Canton: Pays de Bidache, Amikuze et Ostibarre
- Intercommunality: Pays Basque

Government
  - Mayor (2024–2026): Stéphane Poisson
- Area^{1}: 7.66 km^{2} (2.96 sq mi)
- Elevation: 60 m (200 ft)
- Highest elevation: 168 m (551 ft)
- Lowest elevation: 32 m (105 ft)
- Population (2023): 472
  - Density: 61.6/km^{2} (160/sq mi)
- Time zone: UTC+01:00 (CET)
  - Summer (DST): UTC+02:00 (CEST)
- INSEE/Postal code: 64018 /64120
- ^{1} French Land Register data, which excludes lakes, ponds, glaciers > 1 km^{2} (0.386 sq mi or 247 acres) and river estuaries.

Amendeuix-Oneix (French pronunciation: [amɛ̃døʃ ɔnɛʃ]; Basque: Amendüze-Unaso; Occitan: Fineuix) is a commune in the Pyrénées-Atlantiques department in the Nouvelle-Aquitaine region in southwestern France.

The inhabitants of the commune are known as Amendüztar.

== Geography ==
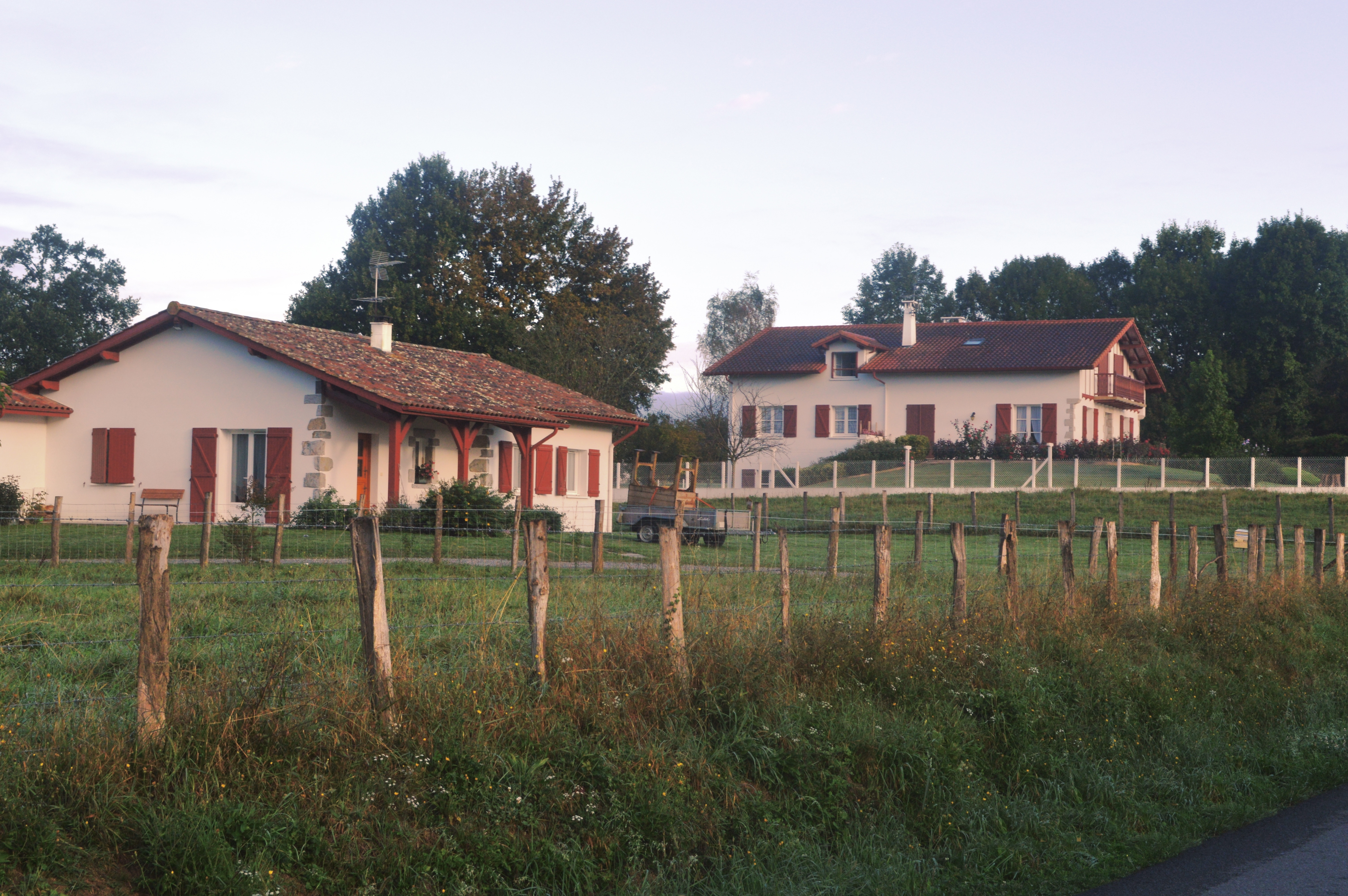
Houses in Amedeuix-Oneix

Amendeuix-Oneix is located some 50 km east by southeast of Bayonne and 40 km south-west of Orthez in the Mixe country in the former Basque province of Lower Navarre. The village can be accessed by the D124 road from Garris in the west passing northeast to the village then continuing north to join the D29. The D11 road also passes through the south of the commune from Garris to Saint-Palais. The small D511 road links the D11 to the D124 within the commune.

=== Hydrography ===
Located in the Drainage divide of the Adour, the northern part of the eastern border of the commune is the Bidouze which flows north to join the Adour west of Peyrehorade. The southern part of the eastern border consists of the Joyeuse with many tributaries rising in the commune including the Algueruko erreka, the Sallarteko erreka, and the Soubiaga erreka. The Aitzeguerris rises just south of the village and flows into the Bidouze.

=== Localities and hamlets ===
- Amendeuix
- Arkausia
- Arlania
- Arrosteguia
- Autrichia
- Berhabia
- Bidainia
- Bordaberria
- Candelenia
- Errecartia
- Etcheberria
- Etchetto
- Eyheraetcheberry
- Gaponteguia
- Goitia
- Guillenteguia
- Hiriberry
- Inchaursague
- Iribarnia
- Jauberria
- Jauhenia
- Landaçaharia
- Larregoyen
- Lauhiteya
- Mantunia
- Oneix
- Oyhamburia
- Peco-Berthoua
- Postateya
- Sabrenia
- Salla
- Vivienborda

== Toponymy ==
The current Basque name is Amendüze-Unaso. Jean-Baptiste Orpustan suggested that Oneix means the 'place of abundant hills'. Brigitte Jobbé-Duval however suggested that Oneix came from the Basque Unanu which means the Asphodelus (plant) and signifies a "place where the asphodelus is abundant. She also suggested that the origin of Amendeuix was Aquitane-Roman to designate a noble domain.

The following table details the origins of the commune name and other names in the commune.

Name	Spelling	Date	Source	Page	Origin	Description
Amendeuix	Sanctus Joannes de Mindus	1160	Orpustan			Village
	Amindux	1316	Orpustan			
	Aminduch	1350	Orpustan			
	Aminduz	1413	Orpustan			
	Mendux	1413	Orpustan			
	Sent-Johan de Mendux	1472	Raymond	5	Notaries	
	Armendux	1513	Raymond	5	Pamplona	
	Amenduxs	1600	Raymond	5	Pau	
	Amendux	1621	Raymond	5	Biscay	
Oneix	Sanctus Petrus de Onas	1160	Orpustan			Village
	Onnaçu	1249	Orpustan			
	Oneyx	1316	Orpustan			
	Honeis	1350	Orpustan			
	Onasso	1394	Orpustan			
	Onex	1472	Raymond	125	Notaries	
	Onecx	1513	Raymond	125	Pamplona	
	Oniz	1621	Raymond	125	Biscay	
	Onazo	1863	Raymond	125		Basque
Hiriberry	Hiriberry	1863	Raymond	78		Hamlet
Jauréguy	Jauréguy	1863	Raymond	85		Fief, Vassal of the Kingdom of Navarre
Lanevieille	La noble salle de Lanevielhe d'Amenduxs	1600	Raymond	91	Pau	Fief, Vassal of the Kingdom of Navarre
	Lanavieja	1621	Raymond	92	Biscay	
	Lanevieille	1863	Raymond	91		
Salla	La Salle	1863	Raymond	154		Fief, Vassal of the Kingdom of Navarre

Sources:

- Orpustan: Jean-Baptiste Orpustan, New Basque Toponymy
- Raymond: Topographic Dictionary of the Department of Basses-Pyrenees, 1863, on the page numbers indicated in the table. (in French)
- Cassini: Cassini Map from 1750

Origins:

- Notaries: Notaries of Labastide-Villefranche
- Pamplona: Titles of Pamplona
- Pau: Titles of the Chamber of the Counts of Pau
- Biscay: Martin Biscay

== History ==
In the 16th century (1594), evidence of witchcraft was reported by an admonition to the States of Navarre by the Prosecutor of Mixe (together with those of Arberoue, Ostabaret, Irissarry, Ossès, Baigorri, and La Bastide-Clairence), who complained of a lack of prosecution and requesting that each town or district of Lower Navarre elect "two men of good character who are not suspects to find and punish the perpetrators of these crimes of witchcraft, apostasy, and magic: to be joined with the people of Roy and all at the expense of those convicted or, in case of insolvency, to those countries and places which will be instructed". Part of this admonition followed a request from the inhabitants of Amendeuix dating from 1587 who claimed to have been victims of "spells that were manifested mainly by evil barking".

The village of Oneix joined with Amendeuix to form the commune of Amendeuix-Oneix on 27 August 1846.

=== Heraldry ===
Arms of Amendeuix-Oneix	Blazon: Quarterly, 1 and 4 of Or with an Oak vert debruised by a boar of sable at the foot of the tree; at 2 and 3 party per fesse wavy of argent and azure.

== Administration ==
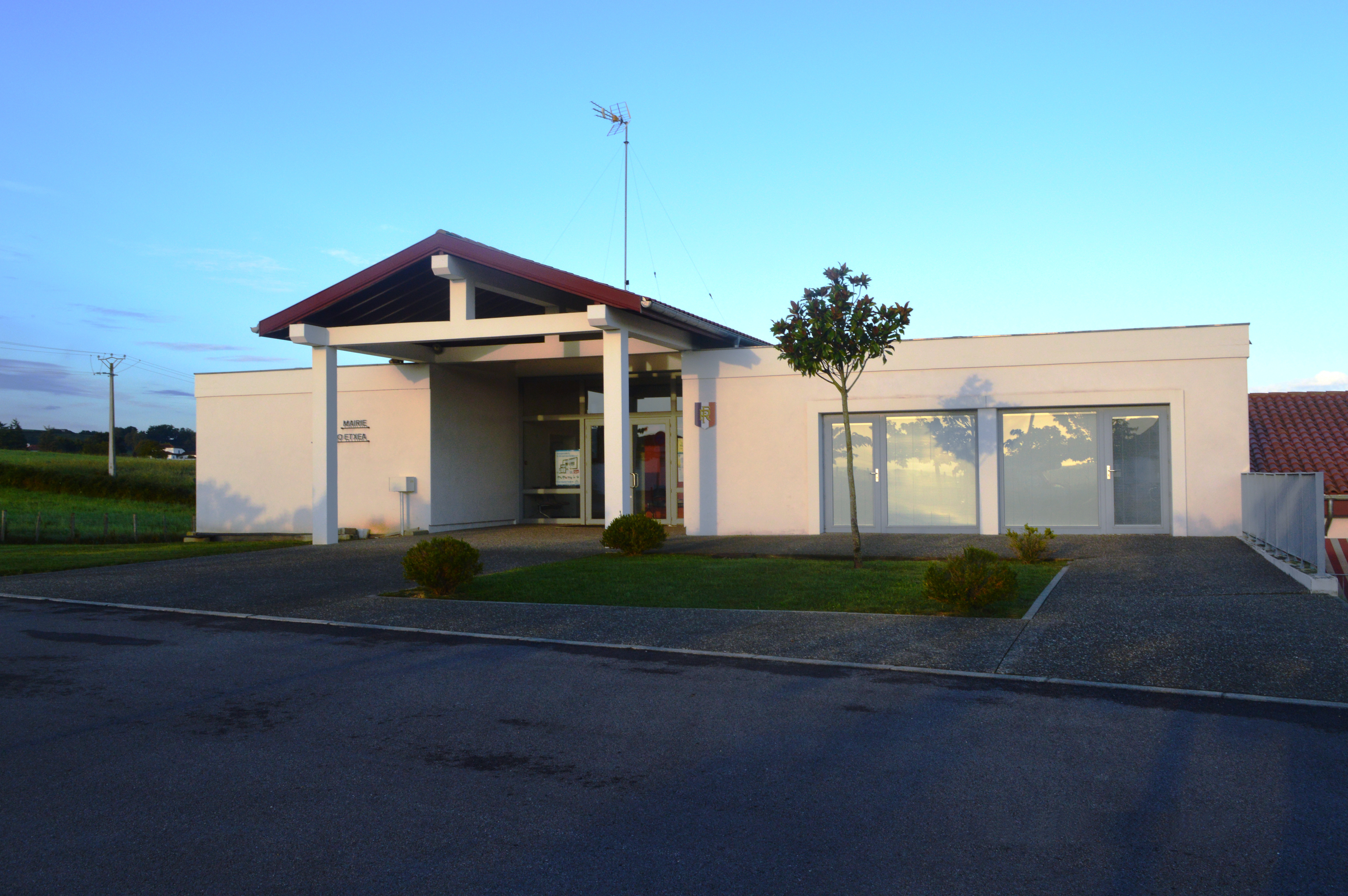
The Town Hall

List of Successive Mayors

From	To	Name
1837	1846	Jean Longy
1846	1848	Jean-Paul Larregoyen
1848	1871	Jean Longy
1871	1873	Franck d'Andurain
1873	1884	Gabriel Longy
1884	1885	Rémy Etcheto
1885	1909	Gabriel Longy
1909	1912	M Sabalette
1912	1938	Jean-Pierre Longy
1938	1945	Auguste de Castelbajac
1959	1974	Léon Longy
1995	2001	Arnaud Mandagaran
2001	2014	Armel Pierre Drouilhet
2014	2020	Arnaud Mandagaran
2020	2024	Jean-Marc Trenthomas
2024	2026	Stéphane Poisson

== Inter-Communality ==
The commune belongs to seven inter-communal structures:

- the Communauté d'agglomération du Pays Basque
- the AEP Association for Mixe country
- the sanitation association for Saint-Palais - Luxe-Sumberraute
- the association for school buses of Amendeuix-Oneix and Gabat
- the energy association for Pyrénées-Atlantiques;
- the inter-communal association for the operation of schools in Amikuze
- the association supports Basque culture

== Demography ==
In 1350 nine fires were reported in Oneix and 15-18 in Amendeuix.

The fiscal census of 1412-1413, made on the orders of Charles III of Navarre, compared with that of 1551 men and weapons that are in this kingdom of Navarre this side of the ports, reveals a demography with strong growth. The first census indicated the presence of 13 fires in Amendeuix with the second showing 40 (33 + 7 secondary fires). The same census reported 8 fires in Oneix in 1412-1413 against 17 (14 + 3 secondary fires) in 1551.

The census of the population of Lower Navarre in 1695 counted 63 fires at Amendeuix and 20 at Oneix.

The population data given in the table and graph below include the former commune of Oneix.

Historical population

Year	Pop.	±% p.a.
1793	341	—
1821	409	+0.65%
1846	424	+0.14%
1872	391	−0.31%
1901	342	−0.46%
1926	321	−0.25%
1946	297	−0.39%
1962	286	−0.24%
1968	289	+0.17%

Year	Pop.	±% p.a.
1975	329	+1.87%
1982	327	−0.09%
1990	381	+1.93%
1999	367	−0.42%
2007	412	+1.46%
2012	428	+0.76%
2017	448	+0.92%
2023	472	+0.87%

Source: EHESS and INSEE

== Economy ==
The commune is part of the Appellation d'origine contrôlée (AOC) zone of Ossau-iraty.

== Culture and Heritage ==
=== Languages ===
According to the Map of the Seven Basque Provinces published in 1863 by Prince Louis-Lucien Bonaparte the dialect of Basque spoken in Amendeuix-Oneix is eastern low Navarrese.

=== Religious heritage ===
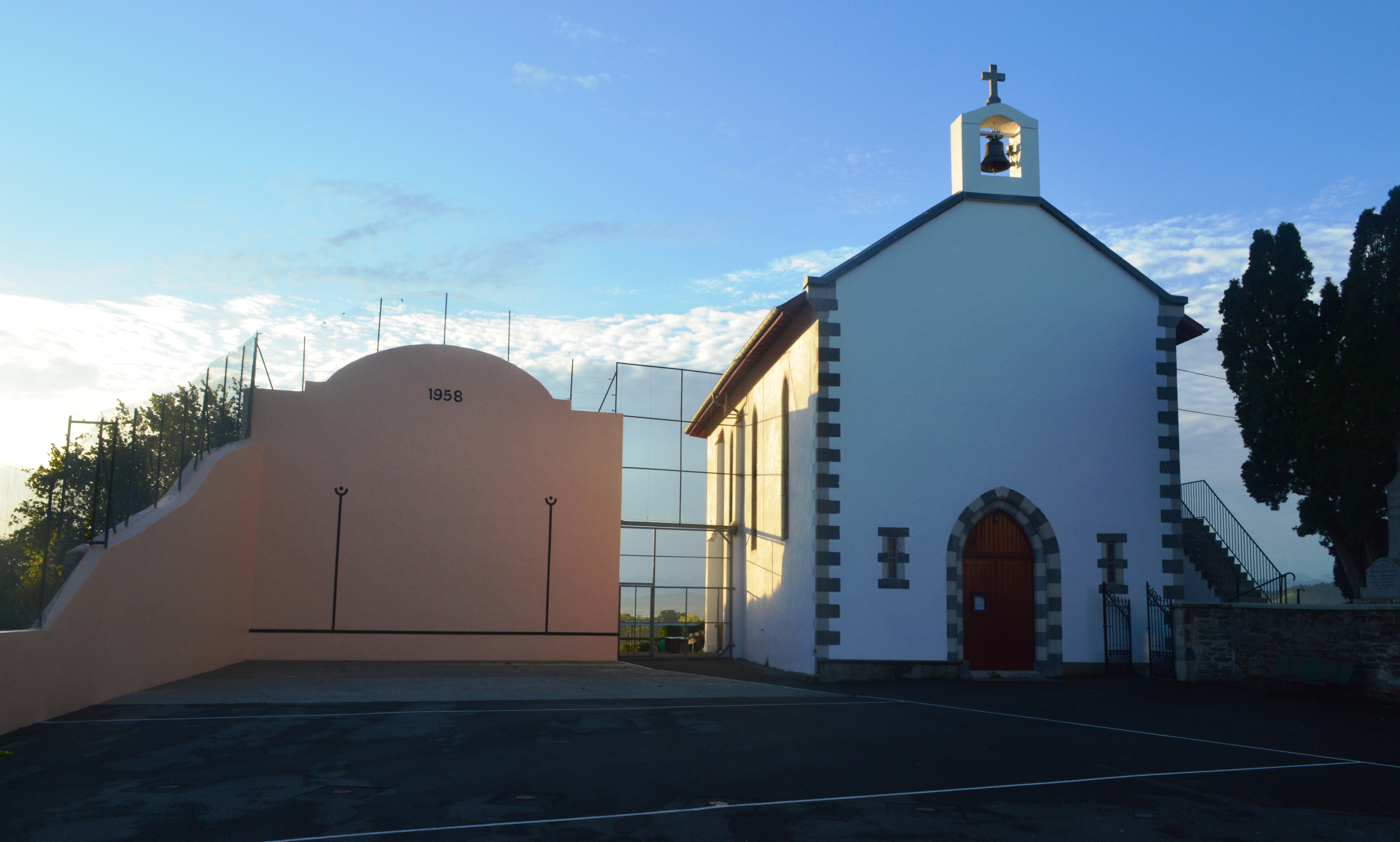
The Church of Saint John the Baptist at Amendeuix

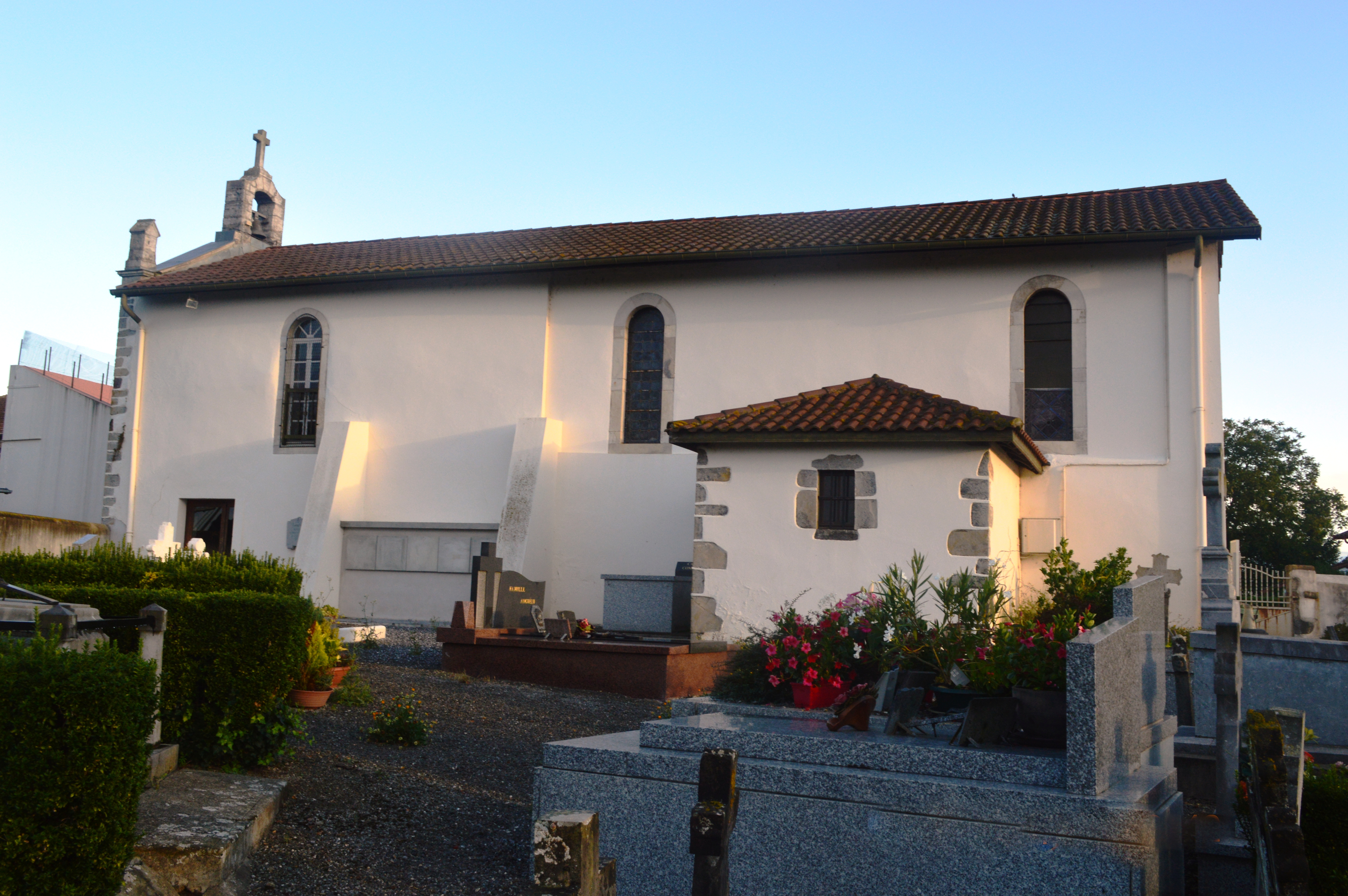
The Church of Saint Peter at Oneix

Two churches in the commune are registered as historical monuments:

- The Church of Saint Peter (1787) at Oneix.
- The Church of Saint John the Baptist (1903) at Amendeuix.

== Amenities ==
=== Education ===
The commune has a kindergarten.

Amendeuix, Gabat, Ilharre, and Labets-Biscay have partnered to create an inter-educational grouping (RPI).

== See also ==
- Communes of the Pyrénées-Atlantiques department
