= La Bastide-Clairence =

La Bastide-Clairence Bastida
- Commune
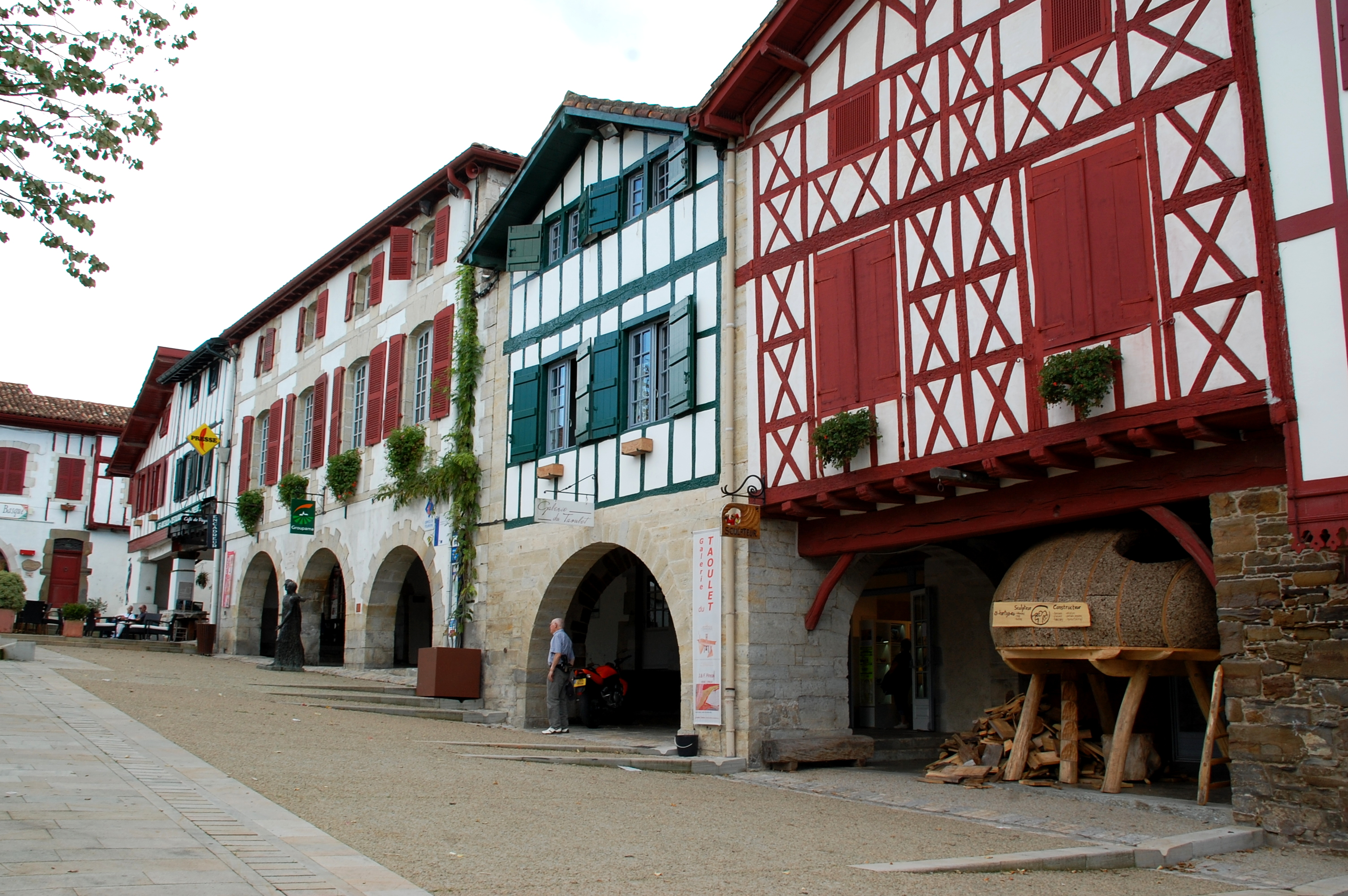
- The Town Hall Square

- Coat of arms
- Location of La Bastide-Clairence
- Location within France Location within Nouvelle-Aquitaine
- Coordinates: 43°25′42″N 1°15′19″W
- Country: France
- Region: Nouvelle-Aquitaine
- Department: Pyrénées-Atlantiques
- Arrondissement: Bayonne
- Canton: Pays de Bidache, Amikuze et Ostibarre
- Intercommunality: CA Pays Basque

Government
  - Mayor (2020–2026): François Dagorret
- Area^{1}: 23 km^{2} (8.9 sq mi)
- Elevation: 28 m (92 ft)
- Highest elevation: 192 m (630 ft)
- Lowest elevation: 7 m (23 ft)
- Population (2023): 1,000
  - Density: 43/km^{2} (110/sq mi)
- Time zone: UTC+01:00 (CET)
  - Summer (DST): UTC+02:00 (CEST)
- INSEE/Postal code: 64289 /64240
- ^{1} French Land Register data, which excludes lakes, ponds, glaciers > 1 km^{2} (0.386 sq mi or 247 acres) and river estuaries.

La Bastide-Clairence (French pronunciation: [la bastid klɛʁɑ̃s]; Basque: Bastida Arberoa, before 1988: Labastide-Clairence; Occitan: La Bastida) is a commune in the Pyrénées-Atlantiques department in the Nouvelle-Aquitaine region of south-western France.

The inhabitants of the commune are known as Bastidots or Bastidotes.

The village is a member of the Les Plus Beaux Villages de France ("The most beautiful villages of France") association.

== Geography ==
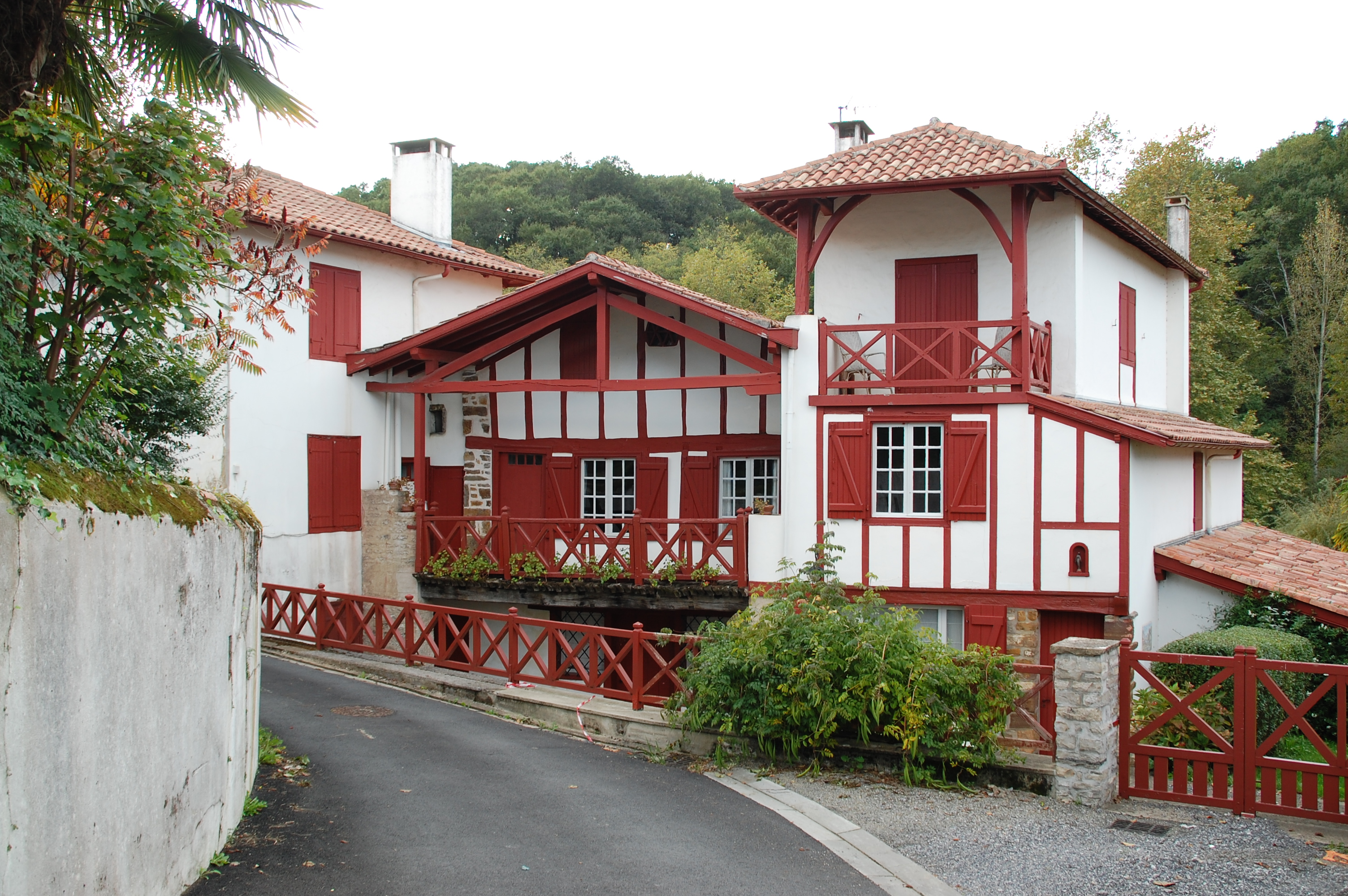
Baserri style house

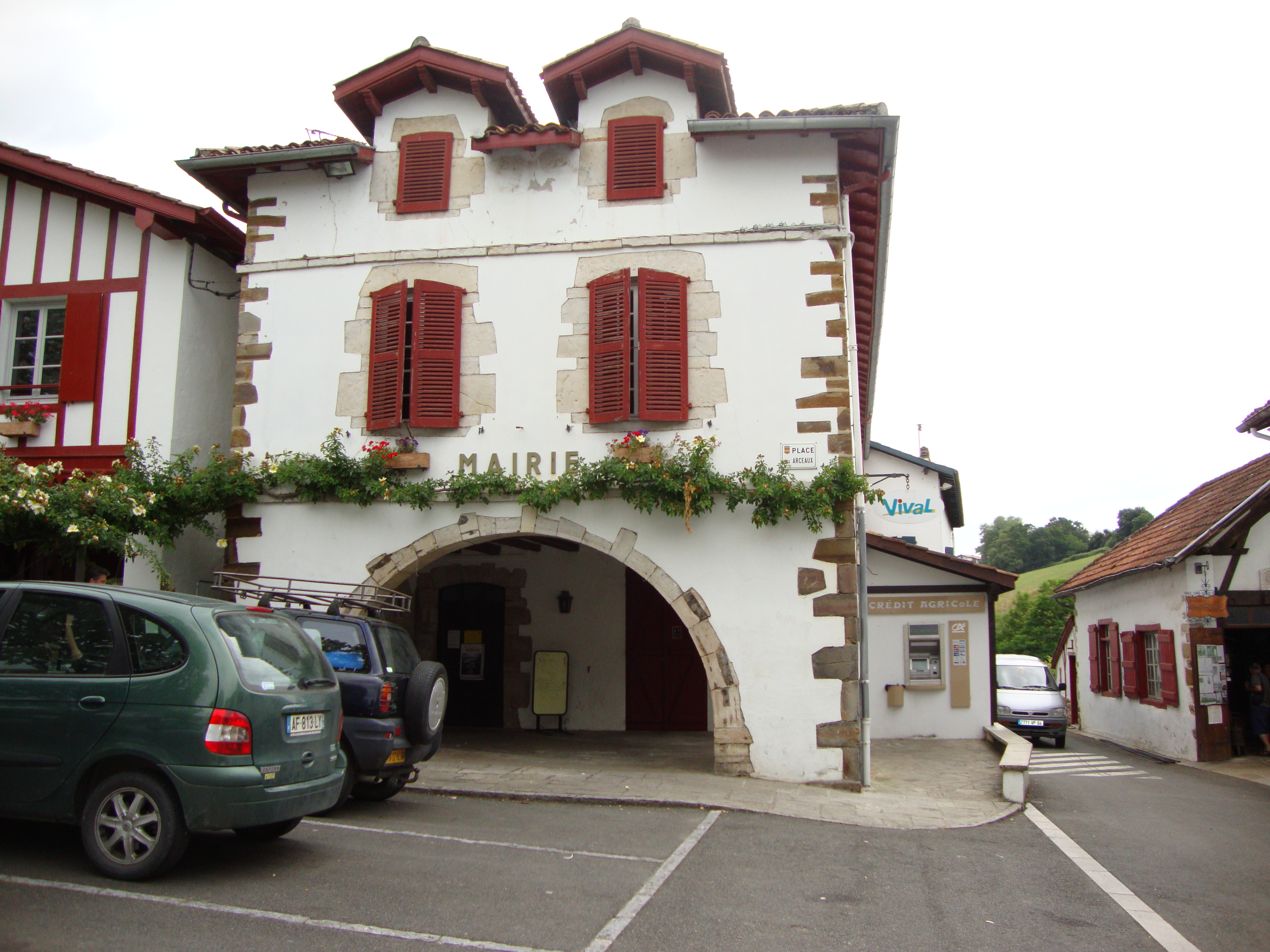
The Town Hall in Navarrese style

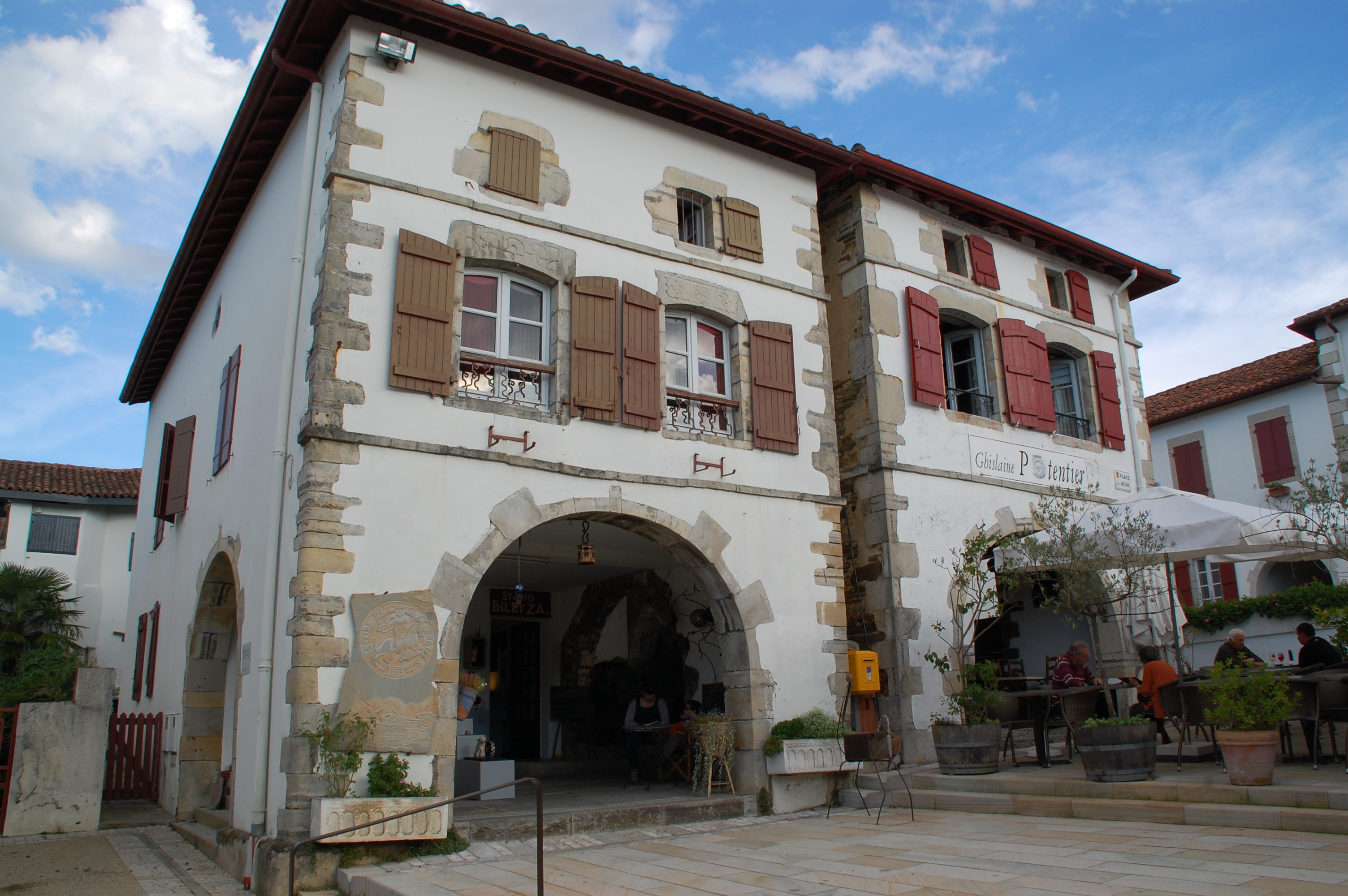
The Place des Arceaux

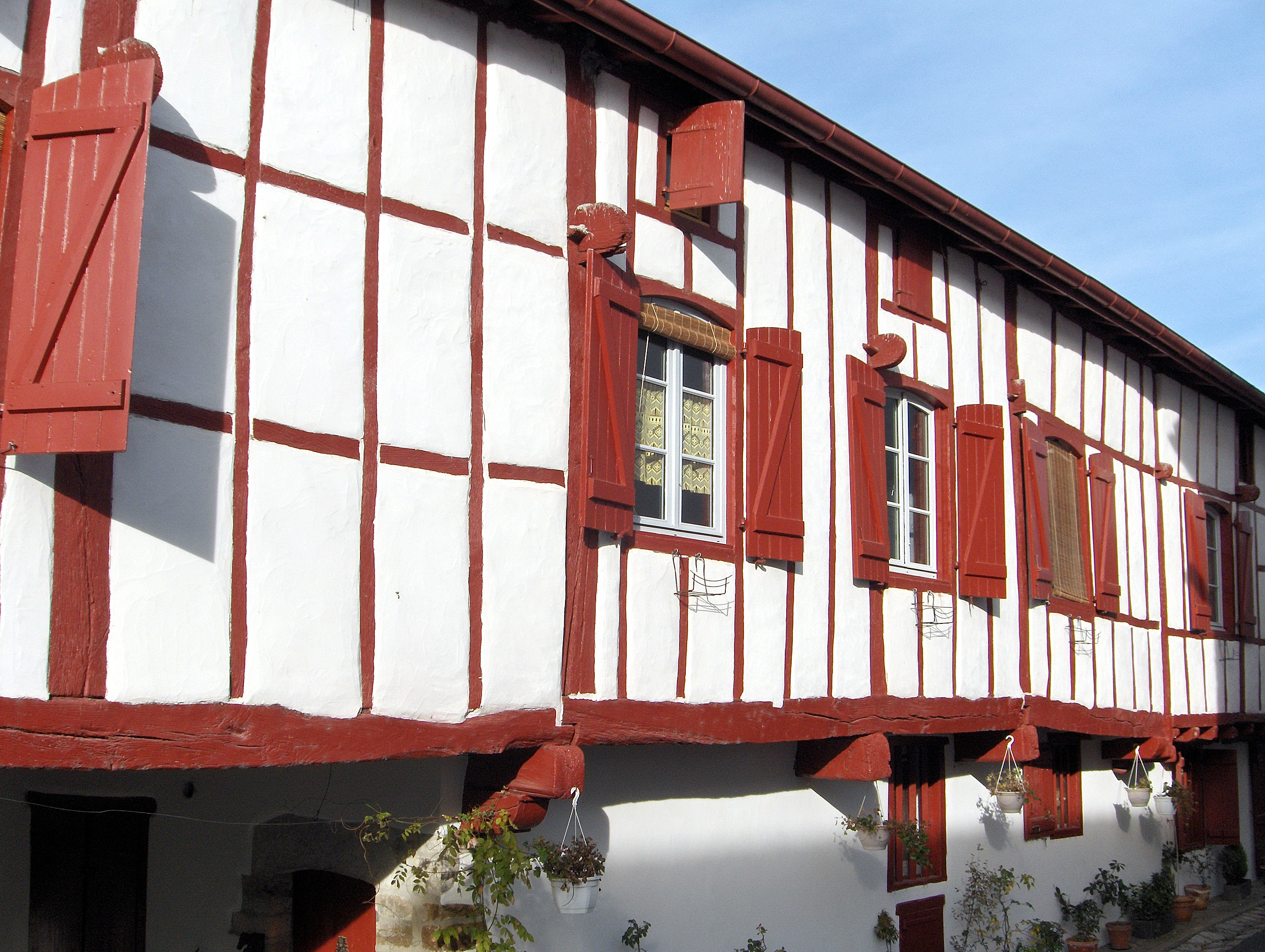
Baserri style house

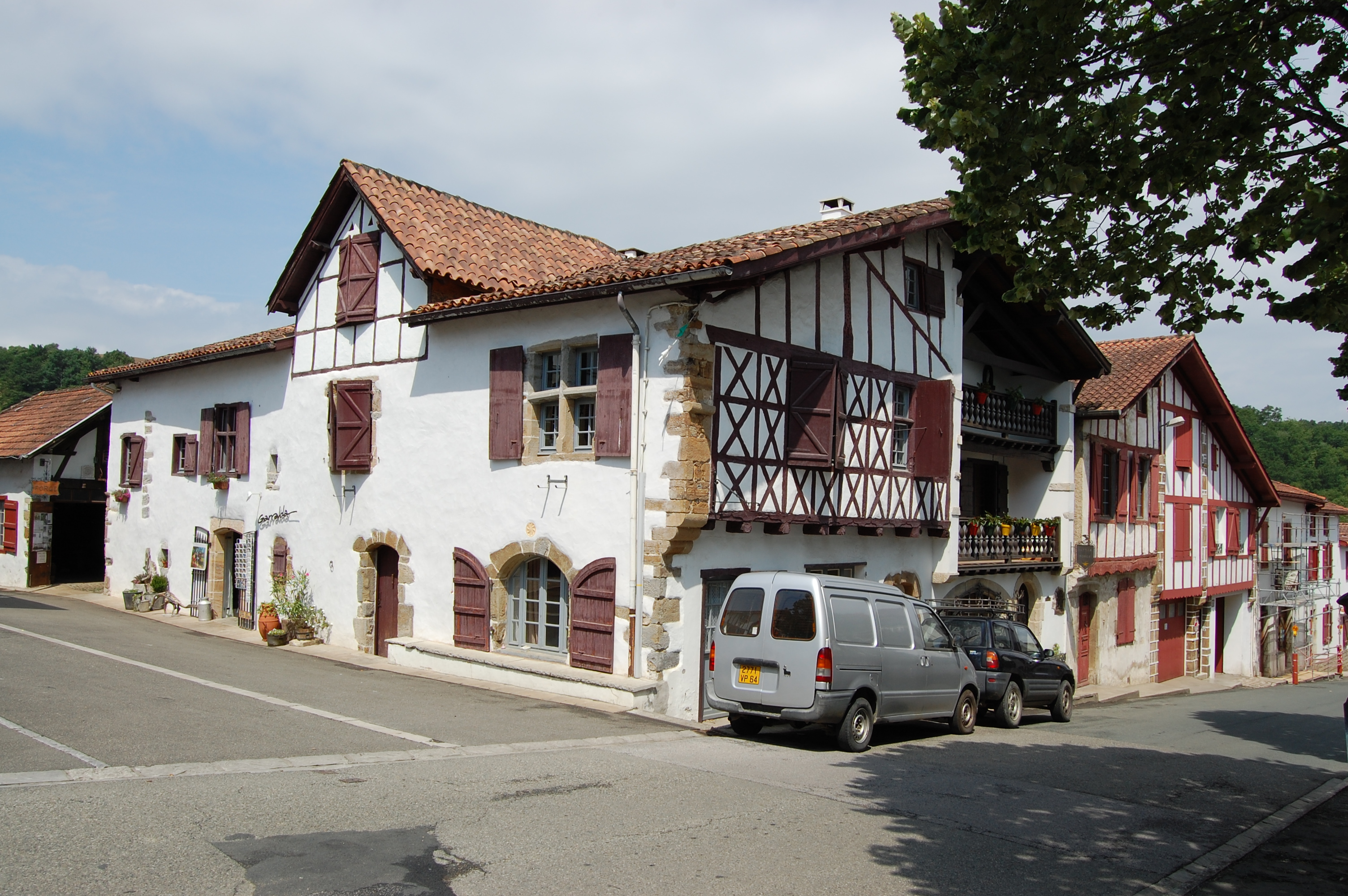
The Maison Garralda

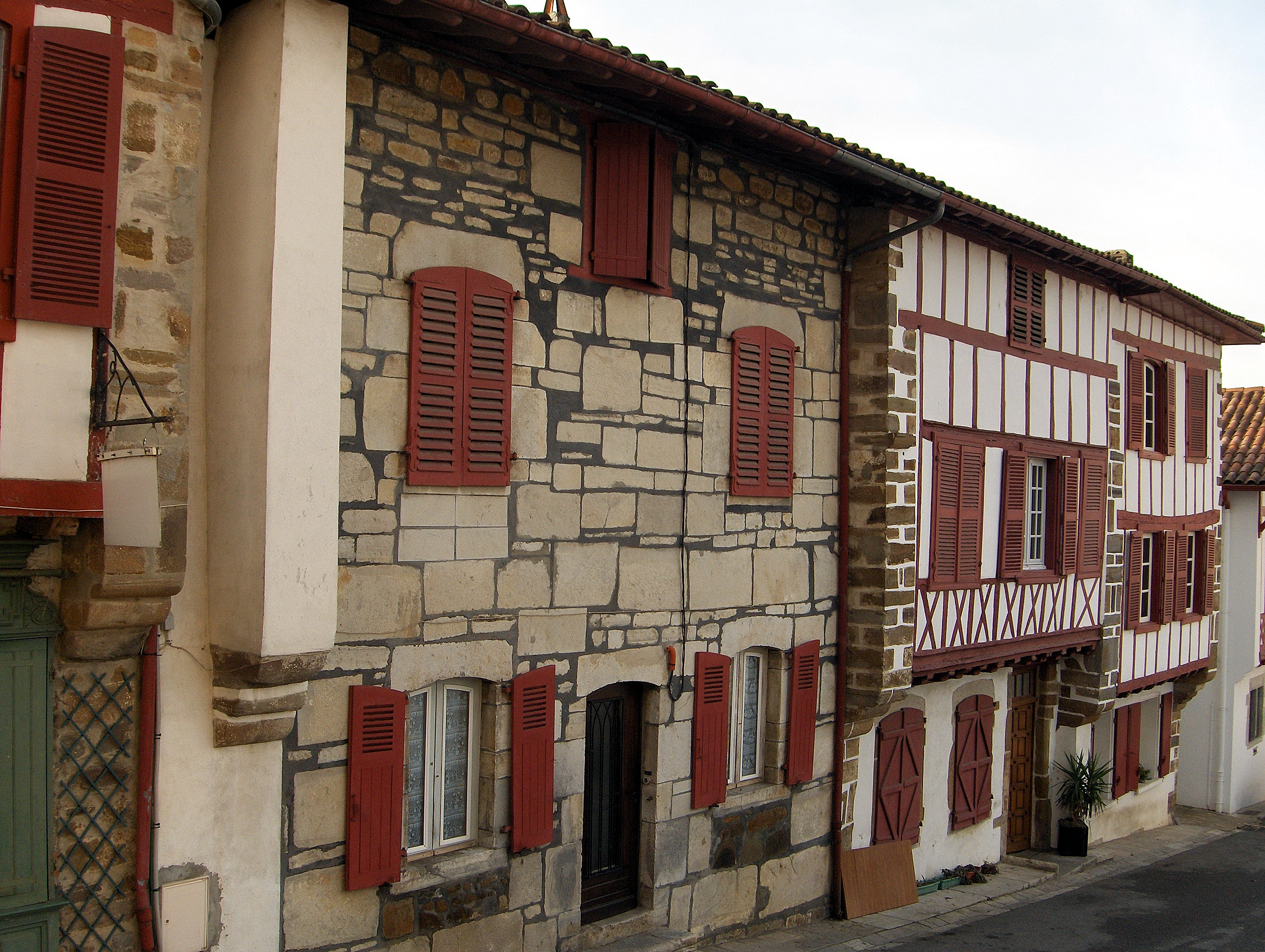
In the village

La Bastide-Clairence is located in the former province of Lower Navarre some 20 km east by south-east of Bayonne and 5 km north-east of Hasparren. Access to the commune is by the D10 road which branches from the D936 north of the commune and comes south to the village continuing south to join the D251 just west of Ayherre. Part of the D510 forms the western border of the commune as it goes south to join the D10 near Hasparren. The D123 goes east from the village through the length of the commune to Amorots-Succos to the south-east. The D610 connects the D510 to the D10 in the commune. The commune is mostly farmland interspersed with forest.

La Joyeuse stream flows from the south through the village and continues north to become the Aran which joins the Adour at Urt. The Arbéroue stream flows from the south-east northwards through the eastern part of the commune to join the Lihoury north-east of the commune.

=== Places and hamlets ===
- le Bourg
- la Côte
- la Chapelle
- Pessarou

== Toponymy ==
The commune name in Basque is Bastida or Bastida Arberoa and in Gascon Occitan is La Bastida Clarença.

The following table details the origins of the commune name and other names in the commune.

Name	Spelling	Date	Source	Page	Origin	Description
Bastide-Clairence	Bastida nueva de Clarenza	1312	Raymond	23	Camara	Village
	la Bastide de Clarence	1364	Raymond	23	Navarre	
	la Bastide	1380	Raymond	23	Duchesne	
	la Bastida de Clarença	1398	Raymond	23	Duchesne	
	La Bastide de Clarensse	1422	Raymond	23	Oloron	
	Bastida de Clarencia	1513	Raymond	23	Pamplona	
	La Bastide de Clerance	1665	Raymond	23	Register	
	Beata Maria de la Bastide de Clerence	1767	Raymond	23	Collations	
Agnescous	Agnescous	1863	Raymond	3		Hamlet
Pessarou	Pessarrou	1863	Raymond	134		Farm

Sources:

- Raymond: Topographic Dictionary of the Department of Basses-Pyrenees, 1863, on the page numbers indicated in the table. (in French)

Origins:

- Camara: Titles of the Camara of Comptos
- Navarre: Titles of the Kingdom of Navarre
- Duchesne: Duchesne collection volume 114
- Oloron: Notaries of Oloron
- Pamplona: Titles of Pamplona
- Register: Register of the States of Navarre
- Collations: Collations of the Diocese of Bayonne

La Bastide-Clairence appears as 'LA BASTIDE Clerence on the 1750 Cassini Map and as LA BASTIDE on the 1790 version.

== History ==
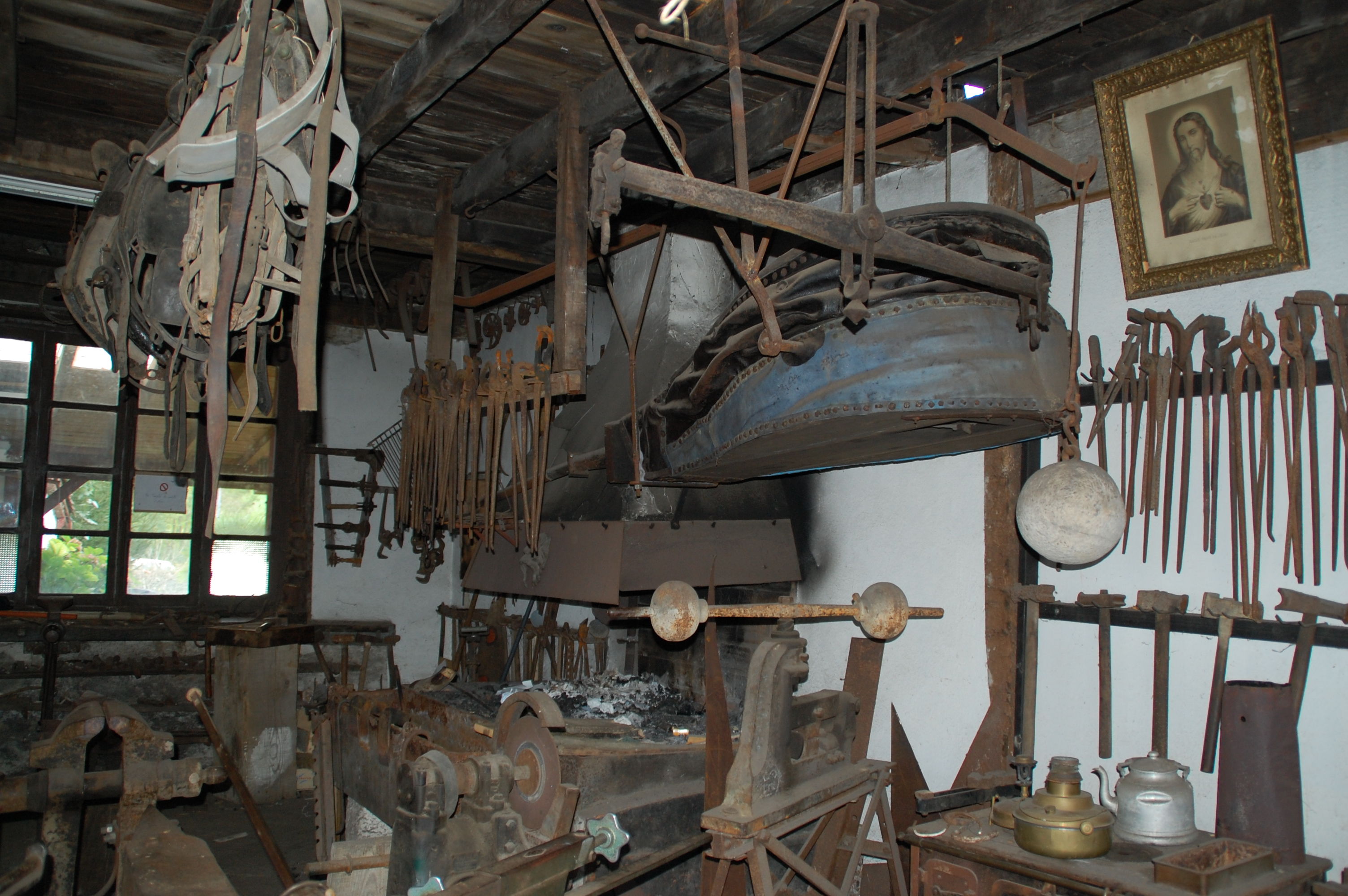
The Forge

A Navarrese fortified village was founded in 1288 by Claire de Rabastens on a hillside next to the Aran river hence its Gascon name Bastida Clarença.

800 refugees, mainly from Bigorre, were granted a charter in July 1312 by Louis I of Navarre, the future Louis X of France. The birth of the village corresponds to a need for Navarre to create a strong town in the forested frontier area. La Bastide-Clairence, as its name suggests, was a fortified town. The historian Paul Broca could still see the remains of its ancient fortress in 1875.

La Bastide-Clairence slowly accumulated a population of shop-keepers from south-western France then from Spanish refugees fleeing the Inquisition, and also from Basque towns and villages nearby. Another version of the origin of the town exists: it was populated by settlers from diverse backgrounds including pilgrims to Santiago de Compostela called the Francos.

By 1700 the population had reached 2,000. The inhabitants lived on the nail industry, woollen garments and knitwear, and agriculture. 12-day fairs ensured the prosperity of the town. In the 16th century the locals did not speak Basque, but spoke Gascon. Subsequently they gradually adopted the Basque language and customs. The town has 320 houses and mills from the 17th century. From 1575 to 1789, La Bastide-Clairence depended on the lords of Gramont.

The city had a large Jewish community after the expulsion of Portuguese Jews in the 16th and 17th centuries.

Today, the Place des Arceaux and its half-timbered houses attract many art craftsmen. The houses are very typical of the region - there are two architectural types:

- the Baserri style with gabled roofs with two slopes, half-timbered façade with red or green colour on overhangs, carved window mullions and lintels.
- the Navarrese style with roofs of 2 or 4 sides and doors with vaulted Arches.

The commune was formerly known as Labastide-Clairence and was renamed La Bastide-Clairence on 25 June 1988.

=== The Jewish community ===
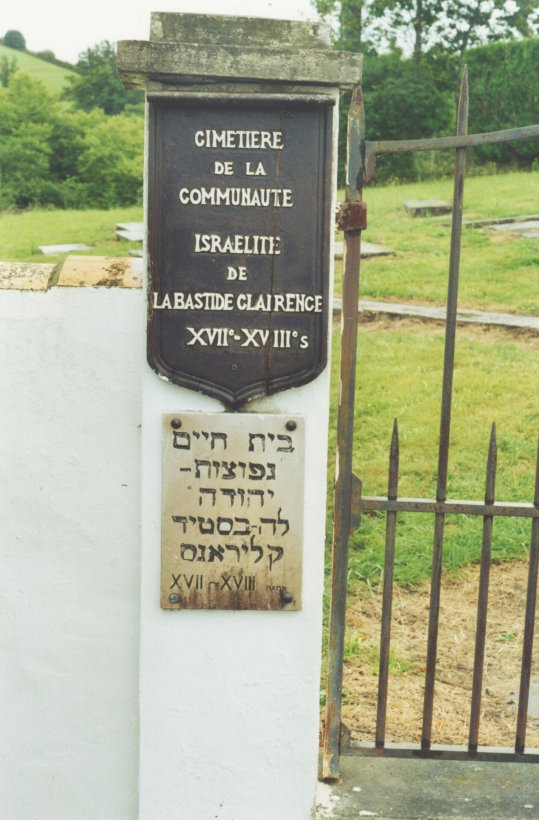
Jewish Cemetery at La Bastide-Clairence

There was a Jewish community for about 200 years from the early 17th century to the end of the 18th century.

Refugees who came from Spain and especially Portugal, the Sephardi Jews, settled in Bayonne at the end of the 16th century from where they spread to the three small towns of Peyrehorade (where they were welcomed by the Lord of Aspremont), Bidache, and La Bastide-Clairence which were protected by the Duke of Gramont.

Often called "Portuguese", there were about 70-80 families in the commune in the 17th century. They lived in a relatively autonomous community designated by the expression "Jewish Nation" on the municipal records and had their own separate cemetery that was opened at the beginning of the 17th century.

The inscriptions on the tombs, numbering 62, were found from 1962 to 1964 by Professor Gérard Nahon. The oldest tomb dates from 1620 with the most recent in 1785. On 18 of them, the date of death is expressed in the Hebrew calendar. From 1659 all had biblical names: Jacob, Isaac, Benjamin, Esther, Sarah, Rebecca. Among family names there are: Dacosta, Henriquez, Lopez Nunez, Depas, Alvares.

The number of Jews decreased significantly in the middle of the 18th century when there were only 15 Jewish families. There remained only 6 in 1798.

The cemetery belongs to the Jewish Consistory of Bayonne.

=== Heraldry ===
Arms of La Bastide-Clairence	The official status of the blazon remains to be determined. Blazon: Lozengy of Or and Gules debruised by a fess of Or over all.

== Administration ==
List of Successive Mayors

From	To	Name
1995	2014	Léopold Darritchon
2014	2026	François Dagorret

== Intercommunality ==
The town participates in nine inter-communal associations:

- the Communauté d'agglomération du Pays Basque;
- the AEP association of Arbéroue;
- sanitation association of Adour-Ursuia;
- the energy association of Pyrénées-Atlantiques;
- the inter-communal association for the management of the Txakurrak center;
- the inter-communal association for the industrial area of Ayherre;
- the inter-communal association for support of Basque culture;
- the joint association for studying, developing, and monitoring the SCOT of the agglomeration of Bayonne and southern Landes;
- the association for the industrial area of Etxecolu at Bardos.

La Bastide-Clairence is the headquarters of the sanitation association of Adour-Ursuia.

== Demography ==
Historical population

Year	Pop.	±% p.a.
1793	2,071	—
1800	1,948	−0.87%
1806	2,043	+0.80%
1821	2,061	+0.06%
1831	2,003	−0.29%
1836	2,209	+1.98%
1841	2,097	−1.04%
1846	2,019	−0.76%
1851	1,836	−1.88%
1856	1,695	−1.59%
1861	1,578	−1.42%
1866	1,529	−0.63%
1872	1,450	−0.88%
1876	1,472	+0.38%
1881	1,470	−0.03%
1886	1,408	−0.86%
1891	1,325	−1.21%
1896	1,364	+0.58%
1901	1,341	−0.34%

Year	Pop.	±% p.a.
1906	1,333	−0.12%
1911	1,241	−1.42%
1921	1,054	−1.62%
1926	1,021	−0.63%
1931	1,101	+1.52%
1936	1,132	+0.56%
1946	946	−1.78%
1954	825	−1.70%
1962	874	+0.72%
1968	821	−1.04%
1975	844	+0.40%
1982	759	−1.50%
1990	852	+1.46%
1999	881	+0.37%
2007	972	+1.24%
2012	1,018	+0.93%
2017	979	−0.78%
2023	1,000	+0.35%

Source: EHESS and INSEE

=== Education ===
The commune has one private and one public primary school.

== Economy ==
Economic activity in the commune is mainly agricultural. The commune is part of the Appellation d'origine contrôlée (AOC) zone of Ossau-iraty.

== Culture and heritage ==
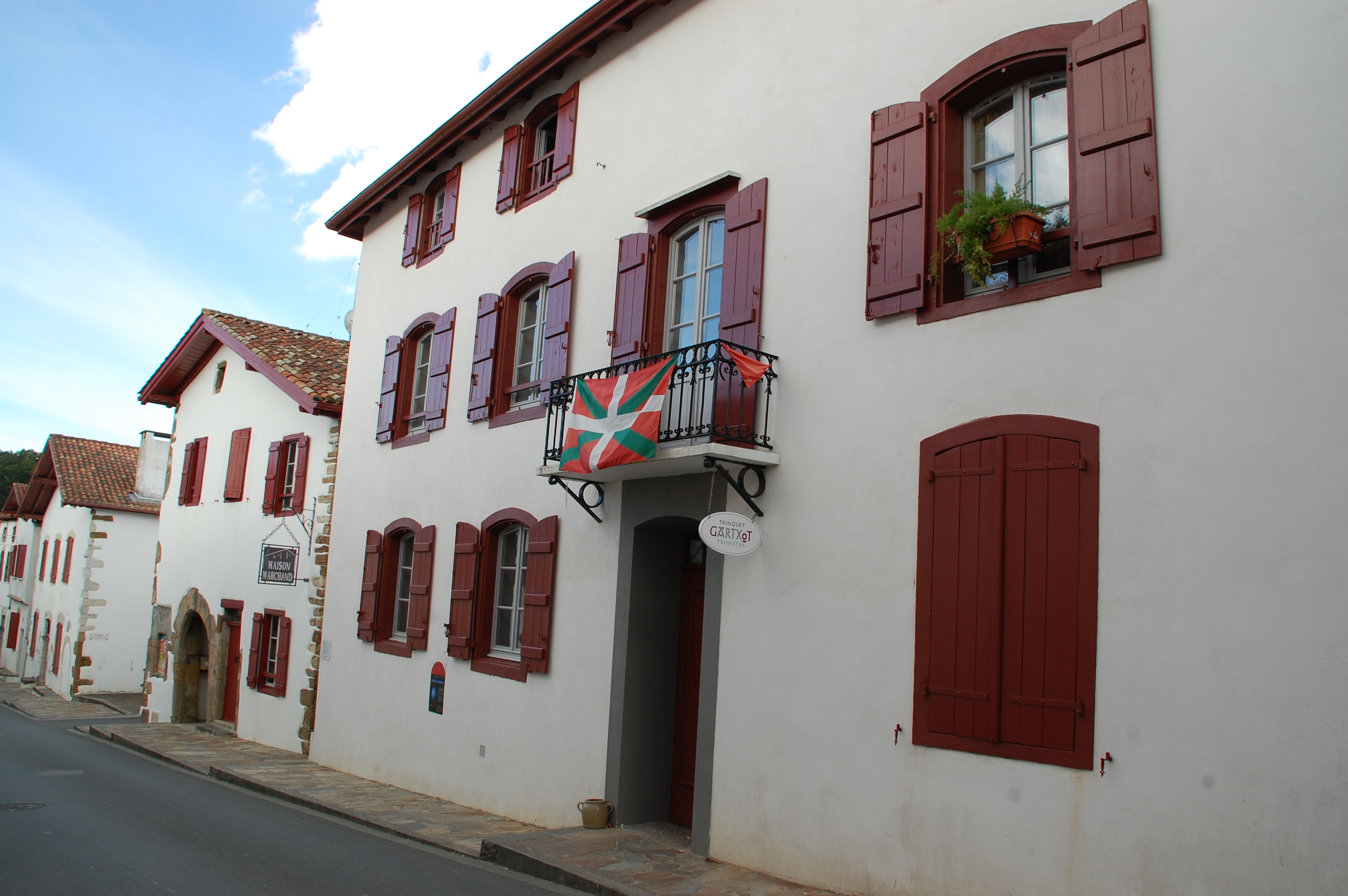
The old Jeu de paume.

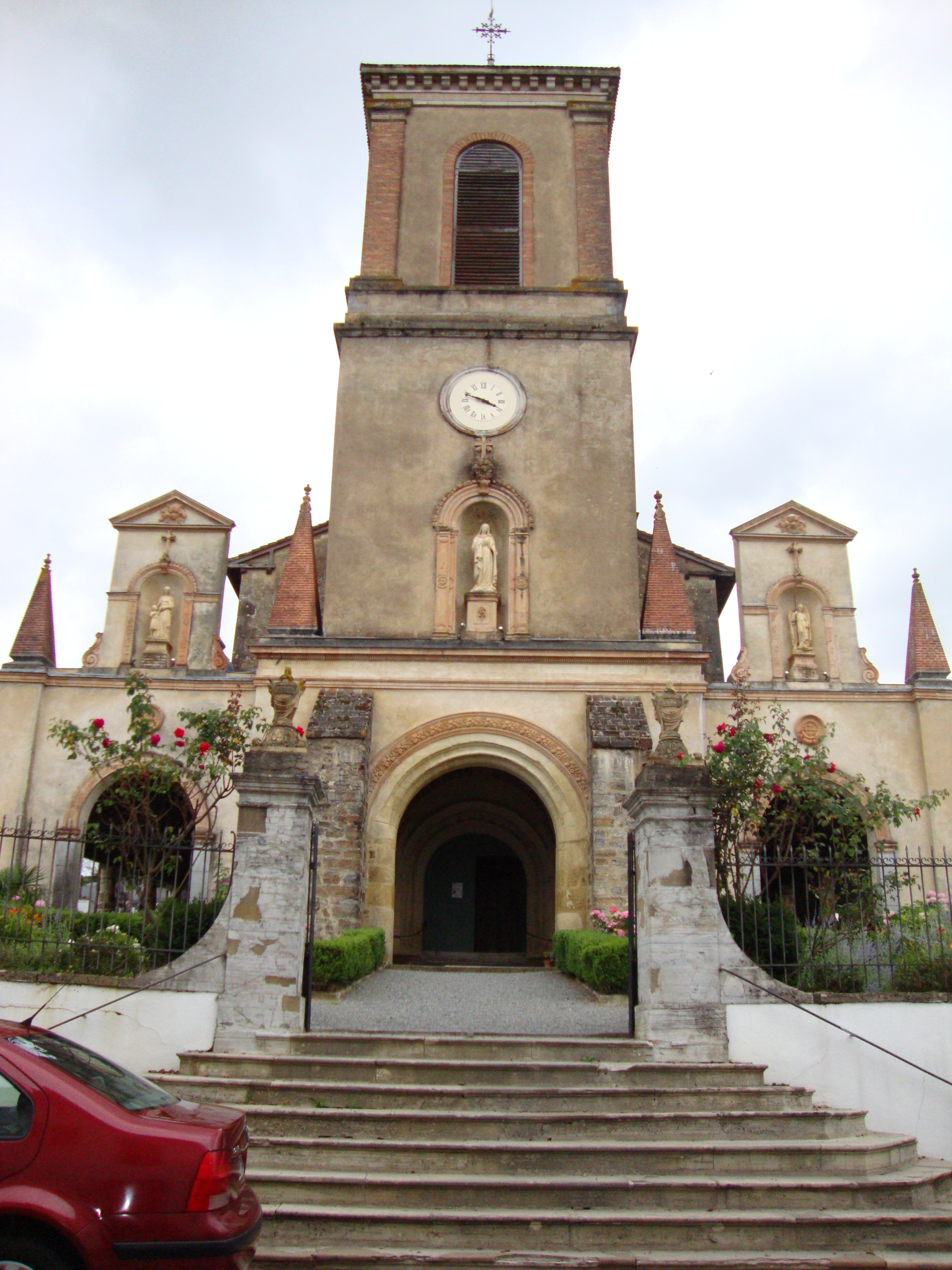
The Church of Notre-Dame-de-l'Assomption

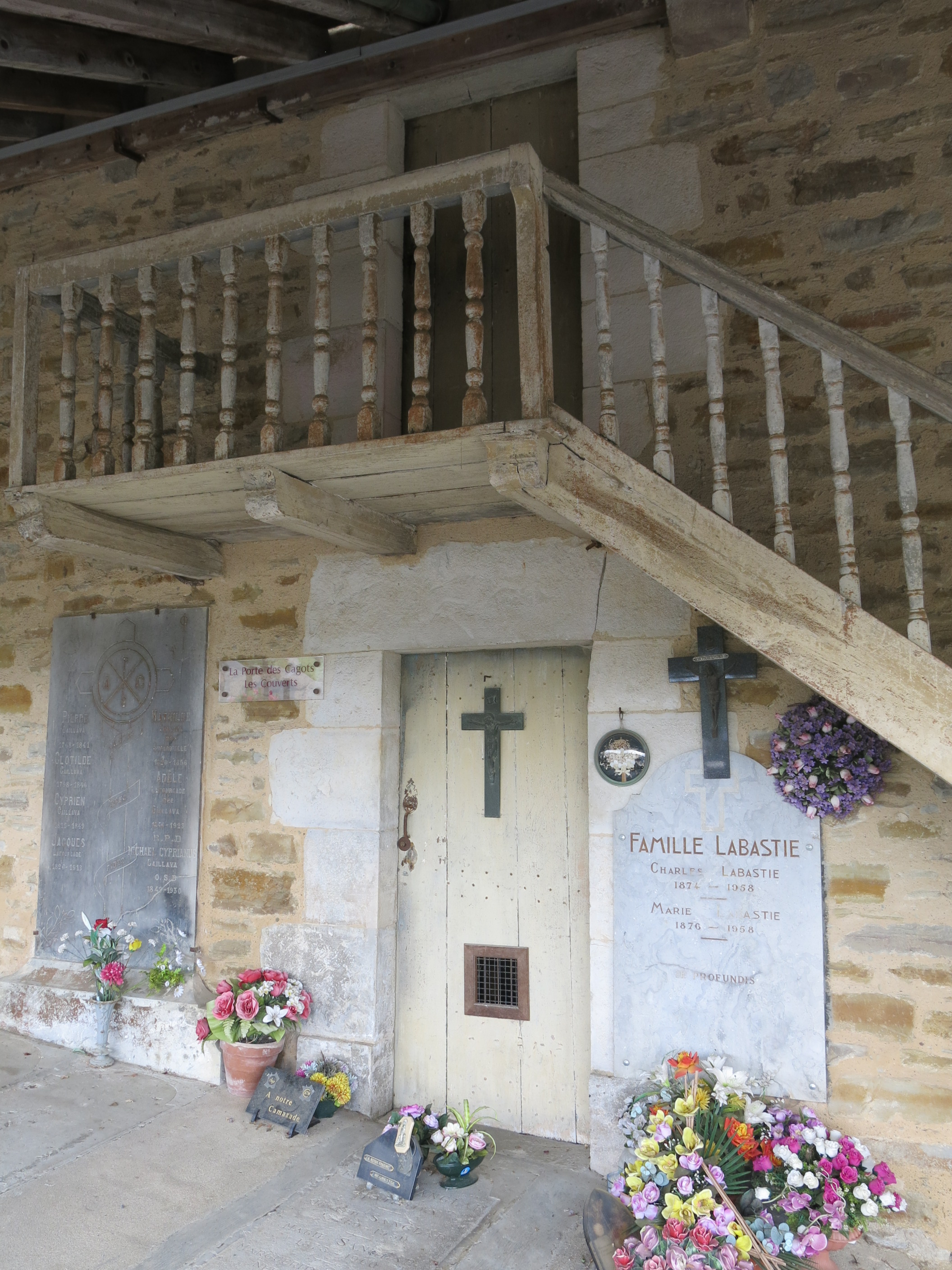
Door of the Cagots at the Church of Notre-Dame-de-l'Assomption.

=== Civil heritage ===
The old Jeu de paume (1842) is registered as an historical monument.

=== Religious heritage ===
The commune has two religious sites that are registered as historical monuments:

- The Church of Notre-Dame de l'Assomption (1715) The church contains a Painting with frame: Virgin and child (18th century) which is registered as an historical object.
- The old Jewish Cemetery (17th century)
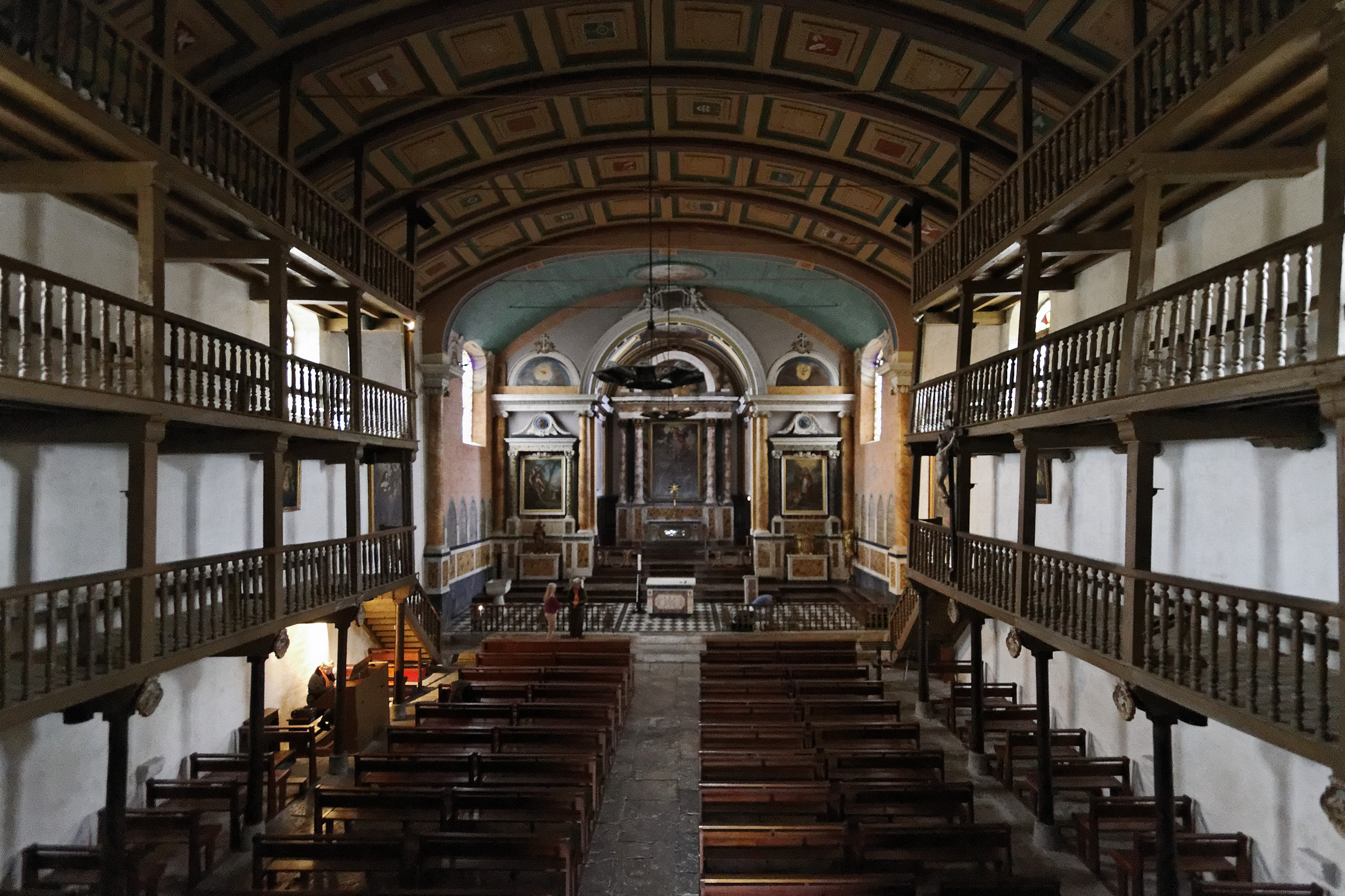
The Church interior

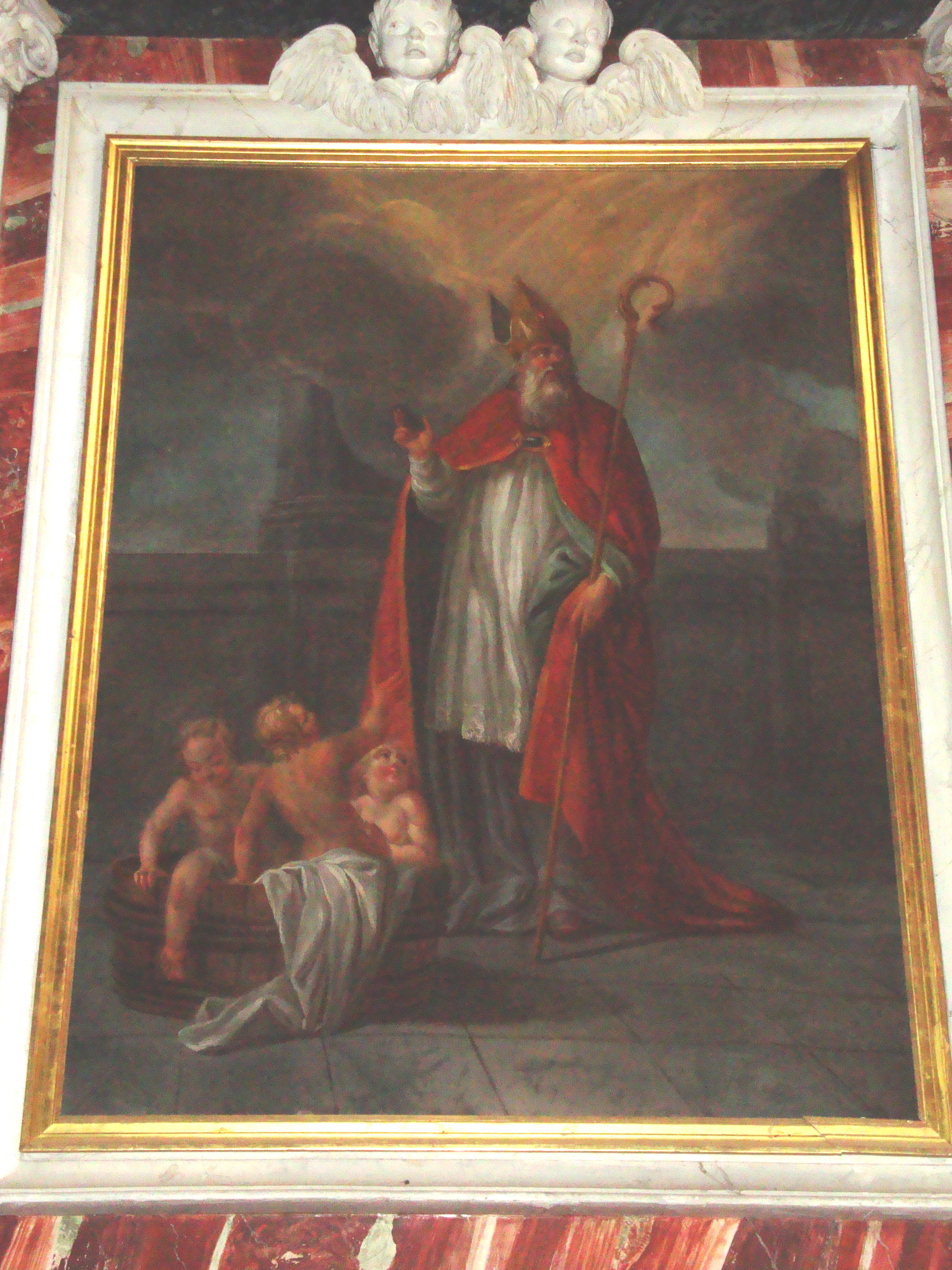
Painting: Virgin and child with Saint Nicholas

== Notable people linked to the commune ==
- Joanes Leizarraga, born at Briscous in 1506 and died at Labastide-Clairence in 1601, translated the first version of the New Testament into Basque or euskara.
- Salvatus I of Iharse (or Salvat Diharce) was named by Henry III of France as Bishop of Tarbes (19 January 1577 - around 1602). He came from a branch of the family from La Bastide-Clairence
- Armand Joseph Dubernad, (1741–1799), financial trader, Freemason, Consul general of the Holy Roman Empire, deputy, mayor, and co-founder of the first Jacobin Club of Brittany.

== See also ==
- Communes of the Pyrénées-Atlantiques department
