= Joanes Leizarraga =

Basque priest (1506–1601)

- Born: 1506; Briscous, France
- Died: 1601 (aged 94–95); La Bastide-Clairence, France
- Congregations served: La Bastide-Clairence

Joanes Leizarraga (1506–1601) was a 16th-century Basque priest. He is most famous for being the first to attempt the standardisation of the Basque language and for the translation of religious works into Basque, in particular the first Basque translation of the New Testament, (1571).

French spellings of his name are often encountered in older works, for example Ioannes Leiçarraga and Jean de Liçarrague and various other spellings of his surname such as Leissarrague or Leiçarraga, or Juan de Lizárraga in Spanish.

== Life ==
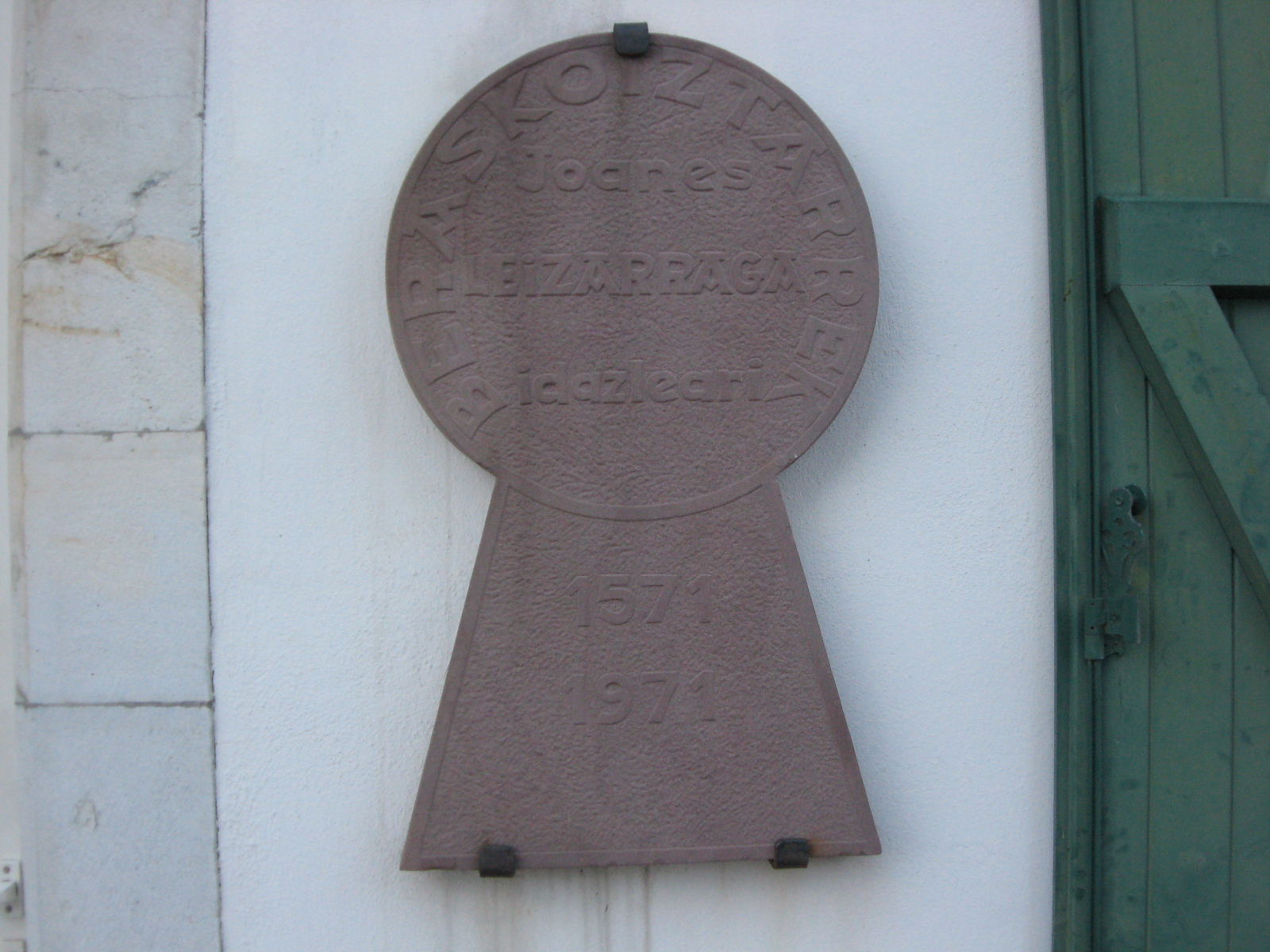
Memorial to Leizarraga in Beskoitze (Briscous) near Bayonne

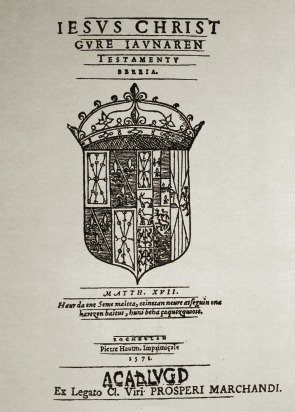
Cover of the New Testament's translation, IESVS CHIST GVRE IAVNAREN TESTAMENTV BERRIA (1571)

=== Early years ===
Leizarraga was born in the Northern Basque Country in the province of Labourd in a village called Briscous in 1506. Although the village was in Labourd, it fell within the area of the Lower Navarrese dialect of Basque. His family's farmhouse bore the family's name, Leizarraga, and stood in Briscous until it was destroyed in 1944. Very little is known about Leizarraga's early years beyond these few facts.

=== Priesthood ===
Leizarraga was baptized a Catholic. Although it is not known where, he was trained as a priest and converted to Protestantism in 1560. By 1563, his name is mentioned in the records of the Protestant Synod of Béarn.

In his dedication of the New Testament to Jeanne d'Albret he mentions having spent time in prison but again, it is not known which prison he was in, what the charge was or how long he was imprisoned for.

He was instituted as rector of the church in Bastide in Lower Navarre in 1567 by Jeanne d'Albret. By the time Leizarraga came to Bastide, the majority of inhabitants were not speaking Basque but Gascon, since it had come to be populated by a Gascon colony. Nonetheless, Leizarraga was even in his time renowned as a great scholar of the Basque language, the very reason he would later be entrusted with the translation of the New Testament. It is also known that various Basque shepherds in the area sent their children to him so that he would teach them Basque.

He was married but it is not known when or to whom.

In March 1563 Leizarraga was instructed by Jeanne d'Albret, the Queen of Navarre at the Synod of Béarn to produce a Basque translation of the New Testament. Having negotiated the tricky issue of translating into a language which by then had no great written tradition, common standard or spelling system, he persevered with some help from four old Catholic colleagues: Piarres Landetxeberri from Espès-Undurein, Sanz de Tartas from Charritte-de-Bas (both in Soule), Joanes Etxeberri from Saint-Jean-de-Luz and a Mr Tardets who was a minister in Ostabat. Finally, in 1571, the printer Pierre Haultin based in La Rochelle printed three works by Leizarraga, amongst them is translation of the New Testament.

It is indicative of the respect he commanded that in 1582 he was visited by Jacques Auguste de Thou, the man who would later negotiate the Edict of Nantes on religious tolerance. In his writings, Thou mentions Leizarraga and the copy of the Basque translation of the New Testament he had been given as a gift during his visit. This copy today is in the National Library of France.

It is also Thou who mentions the exceptionally harmonious relationship between Protestants and Catholics in Bastide where according to him both faiths were worshipped in the church, something that was rare in 16th century France which is known for its religious wars.

By 1594 Leizarraga was no longer attending the Synod of Béarn, the record stating Monsieur de Lissarrague, ministre de Labastide de Clarence, excusé pour sa vieillesse et pour son indisposition Mr Liazarraga, minister of Bastida, makes his excuse due to old age and being indisposed. He died in Bastide in 1601 at the age of 95.

== Leizarraga's work ==
Leizarraga published three books, all in 1571:

- Iesus Christ Gure Iaunaren Testamentu Berria (The New Testament of Jesus Christ our Lord).
- Kalendrera (a calendar of religious holiday).
- ABC edo Christinoen instructionea (ABC or the Christian's Instruction).

The most famous of these undoubtedly is the Testamentu Berria which even today is known as "Leizarraga's New Testament". Apart from the New Testament's main text, his translation also includes the following addenda:

- Testamentu Berrian diraden icen propri Hebraico eta Greco batzuén declarationeo ("Listing of some of the Hebrew and Greek proper names contained in the New Testament"), 3 pages
- Testamentu Berrico hitz eta mincatzeco manera difficil bakoitz batzu bere declarationéquin ("Listing with explanations of a number of difficult words and expressions of the New Testament"), 13 pages.
- Çuberoaco herrian usançatan eztiraden hitz bakoitz batzu hango ançora itzuliac ("Some words not used in Zuberoa with their local equivalents"), 2 pages.
- Testamentu Berrico materien erideteco taulá ("A table for finding topics of the New Testament"), 48 pages
- a long section on how to conduct ecclesiastical ceremonies:
  - Othoitza ecclesiasticoen forma ("The way of ecclesiastical prayer"), 15 pages.
  - Baptismoaren administratzeco form ("The way of administering baptism"), 6 pages.
  - Cenaren celebratzeco forma ("The way of celebrating mass"), 5 pages.
  - Ezconcaren celebratzeco forma ("The way of celebrating a wedding"), 5 pages.
  - Erien visitatzeaz ("On visiting the ill"), 2 pages.
  - Catechismea, cein erran nahi baita, Iesus Christen doctrinán haourrén iracasteco formá... ("The Catechism, meaning the way of teaching the doctrine of Jesus Christ to children..."), a 62-page section in a question and answer format.
- a short treatise on the life of a Christian.

The Kalendrera is short, 15 page calendar with monthly listings of religious events and holidays, the ABC a short collection of common prayers and instructions on how to conduct daily worship.

=== Critical appraisal ===
The main criticism that has been made of his work is that he often used Romance loanwords where native terms exist. For example, he translates "fisher of men" as giza pescadorea rather than giza arrantzalea. At the same time, he uses grammatical forms which were most likely archaic even in his period.

The other main criticism was that, as an over-regional standard, he based it too much on his native Lapurdian dialect and the two other Northern dialects with very little regard to the Southern dialects. However, it must be remembered that he was the first to tackle standardization and that there was no previous work he could build upon and that with his limited resources he had to carry out most of the work himself.

Overall, the quality of his translations and the thoroughness of his effort at standardizing Basque were and are recognized today, and have in no small way contributed to the formation of Standard Basque.

=== Leizarraga as a source ===
Leizarraga's texts provide a wealth of data on the Basque of his time.

- His work includes one of the few documented tripersonal verb forms where the direct object is not in the third person: gommendatzen cerauzquiotet "I recommend you to them", which is a type of Basque verb formation no longer in use.
- He is one of the first known authors to have used the term heuscal herria (Euskal Herria in modern spelling, meaning "Basque Country").

As an example, the following is a comparison between Leizarraga's version and the modern version of the Lord's prayer (in Leizarraga's orthography):

Leizarraga	Bizkaian	Standard Basque	English
Gure Aita ceruëtan aicena, Sanctifica bedi hire Icena. Ethor bedi hire Resumá. Eguin bedi hire vorondatea, ceruän beçala lurrean-ere. Gure eguneco oguia iguc egun. Eta barka ietzaguc gure bekatuac, nola guc-ere offensatu gaituztenér barkatzen baitrauëgu. Eta ezgaitzala sar eraci tentationetan, baina deliura gaitzac gaitzetic. Amen.	Aita gurea zeruetan zagozana, donetsia izan bedi zure izena. Betor gugana zure erregekuntzea. Egin bedi zure naia, zelan zeruan alan lurrean ere. Egunean eguneango gure ogia gaur emon eiguzu. Ta parkatu gure zorrak gure zordunai guk parketan deutseguzan legez. Ez itxi zirikaldian jausten ezpabe gorde gaizuz gatxetik. Amen	Gure Aita zeruetan zaudena, santu izan bedi zure izena. Etor bedi zure erreinua. Egin bedi zure nahia, zeruan bezala lurrean ere. Emaguzu gaur egun honetako ogia. Barkatu gure zorrak geuk ere gure zordunei barkatzen diegun bezala. Eta ez gu tentaldira eraman baina atera gaitzazu gaitzetik. Amen	Our Father who art in heaven, Hallowed be thy Name. Thy kingdom come. Thy will be done, On earth as it is in heaven. Give us this day our daily bread. And forgive us our trespasses, As we forgive those who trespass against us. And lead us not into temptation, But deliver us from evil. Amen.

== Standardisation of Basque ==
Leizarraga's work represents the first documented effort to bring together the various Basque dialects in a single standard. His form of Basque was largely based on the Northern dialects Lapurdian, Zuberoan and Lower Navarrese which at the time were considered the prestigious varieties of Basque.

He discusses the issue of dialectal divergence in the foreword and says:

...batbederac daqui heuscal herriã quasi etche batetic bercera-ere minçatzeco manerán cer differentiá eta diuersitatea den... [everyone knows how the manner of speaking almost changes from one house to the next in the Basque Country]

In the 20th century, Federico Krutwig proposed to the Basque Academy Leizarraga's language as the basis for Modern Standard Basque, but his ideas did not get enough support.
