= Briscous =

Briscous Beskoitze
- Commune
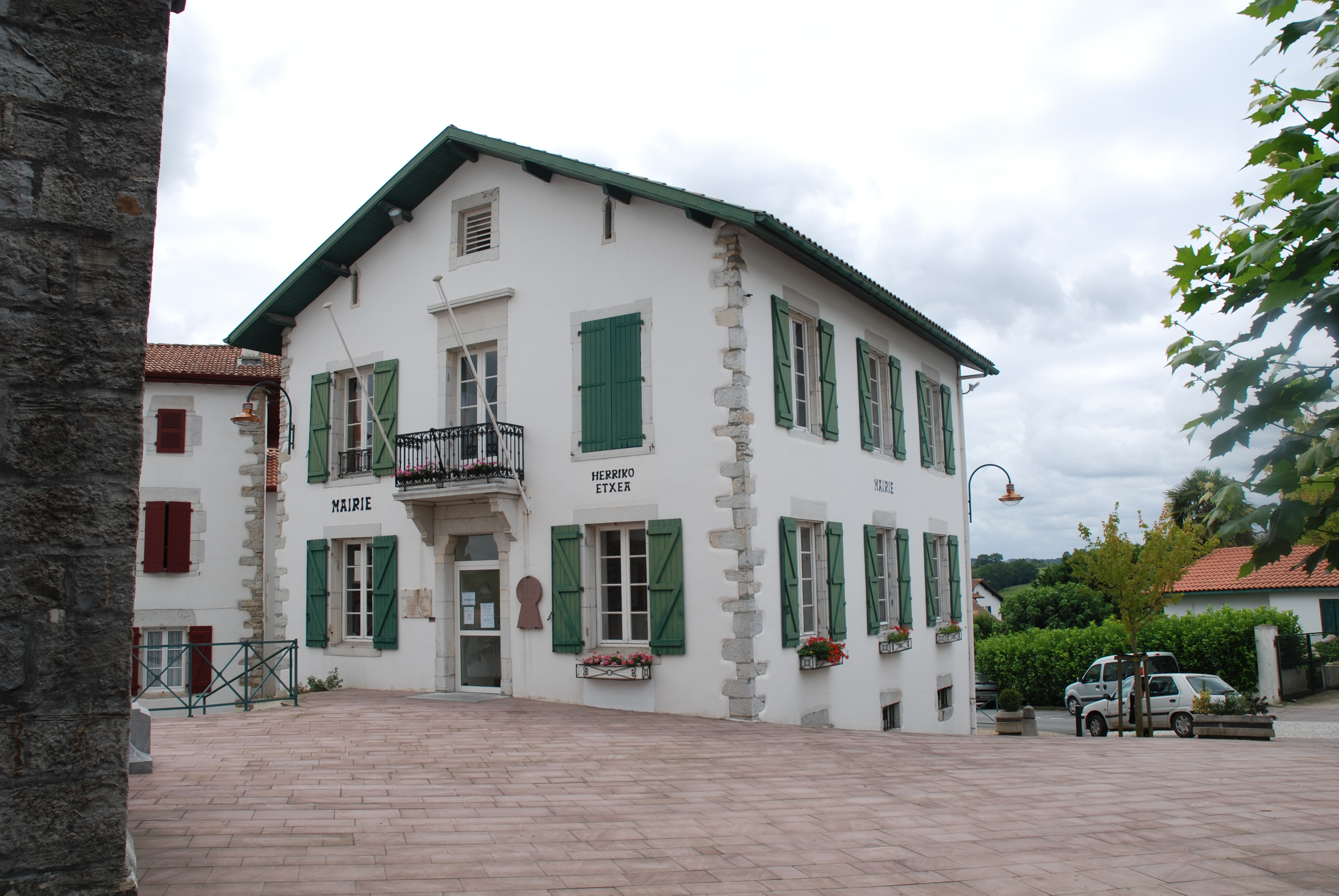
- The town hall of Briscous

- Coat of arms
- Location of Briscous
- Location within France Location within Nouvelle-Aquitaine
- Coordinates: 43°27′39″N 1°19′57″W
- Country: France
- Region: Nouvelle-Aquitaine
- Department: Pyrénées-Atlantiques
- Arrondissement: Bayonne
- Canton: Nive-Adour
- Intercommunality: CA Pays Basque

Government
  - Mayor (2024–2026): Pascal Jocou
- Area^{1}: 31.29 km^{2} (12.08 sq mi)
- Elevation: 120 m (390 ft)
- Highest elevation: 135 m (443 ft)
- Lowest elevation: 0 m (0 ft)
- Population (2023): 2,965
  - Density: 94.76/km^{2} (245.4/sq mi)
- Time zone: UTC+01:00 (CET)
  - Summer (DST): UTC+02:00 (CEST)
- INSEE/Postal code: 64147 /64240
- ^{1} French Land Register data, which excludes lakes, ponds, glaciers > 1 km^{2} (0.386 sq mi or 247 acres) and river estuaries.

Briscous (French pronunciation: [bʁiskus]; Occitan: Briscos; Basque: Beskoitze) is a town and a commune in the Pyrénées-Atlantiques department in southwestern France. It is part of the traditional Basque province of Labourd.

== Population ==
Historical population
Year	Pop.	±% p.a.
1968	938	—
1975	1,085	+2.10%
1982	1,413	+3.85%
1990	1,745	+2.67%
1999	1,988	+1.46%
2007	2,454	+2.67%
2012	2,642	+1.49%
2017	2,806	+1.21%
2023	2,965	+0.92%
Source: INSEE

== Gallery ==
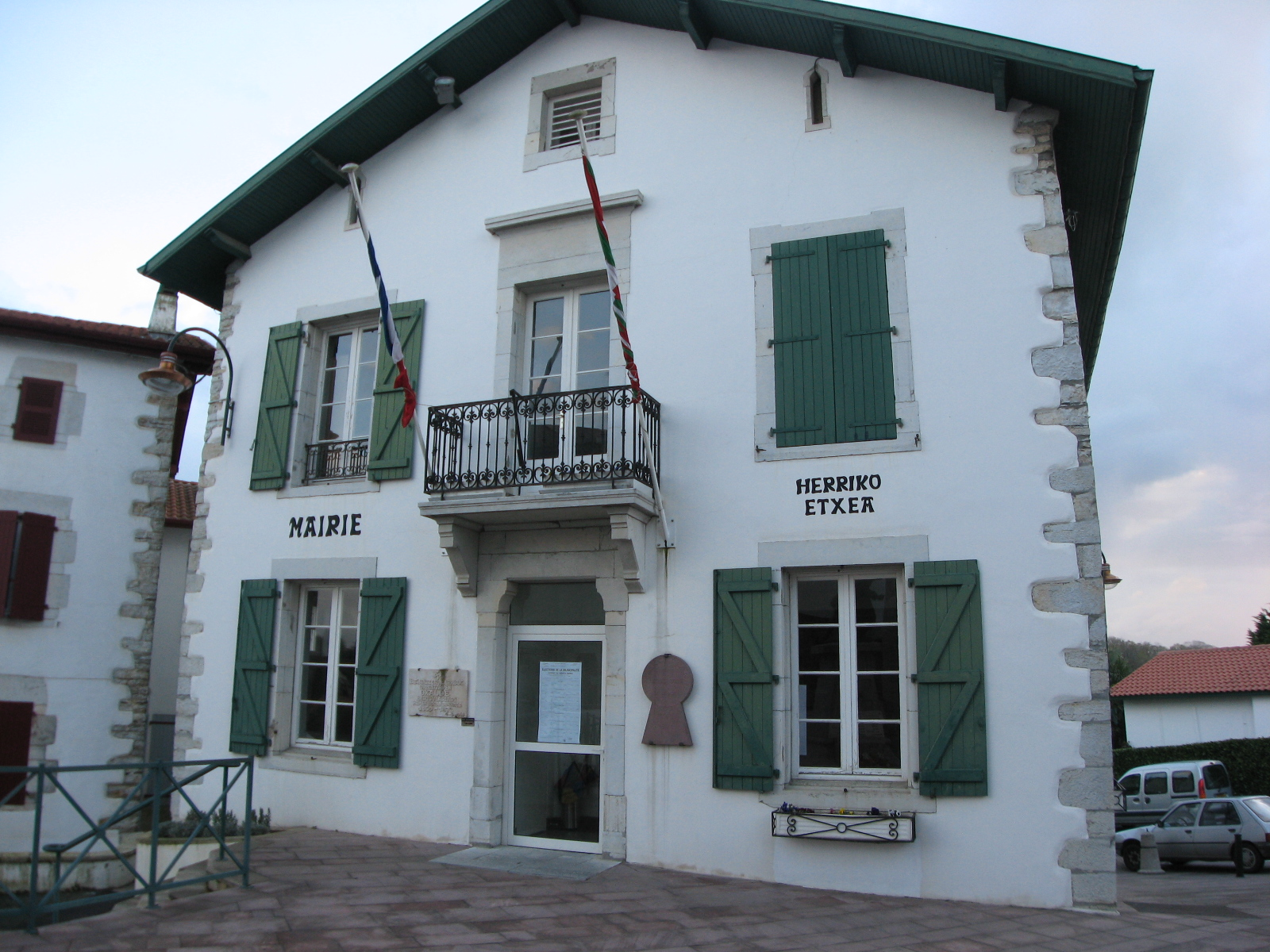
Town Hall.

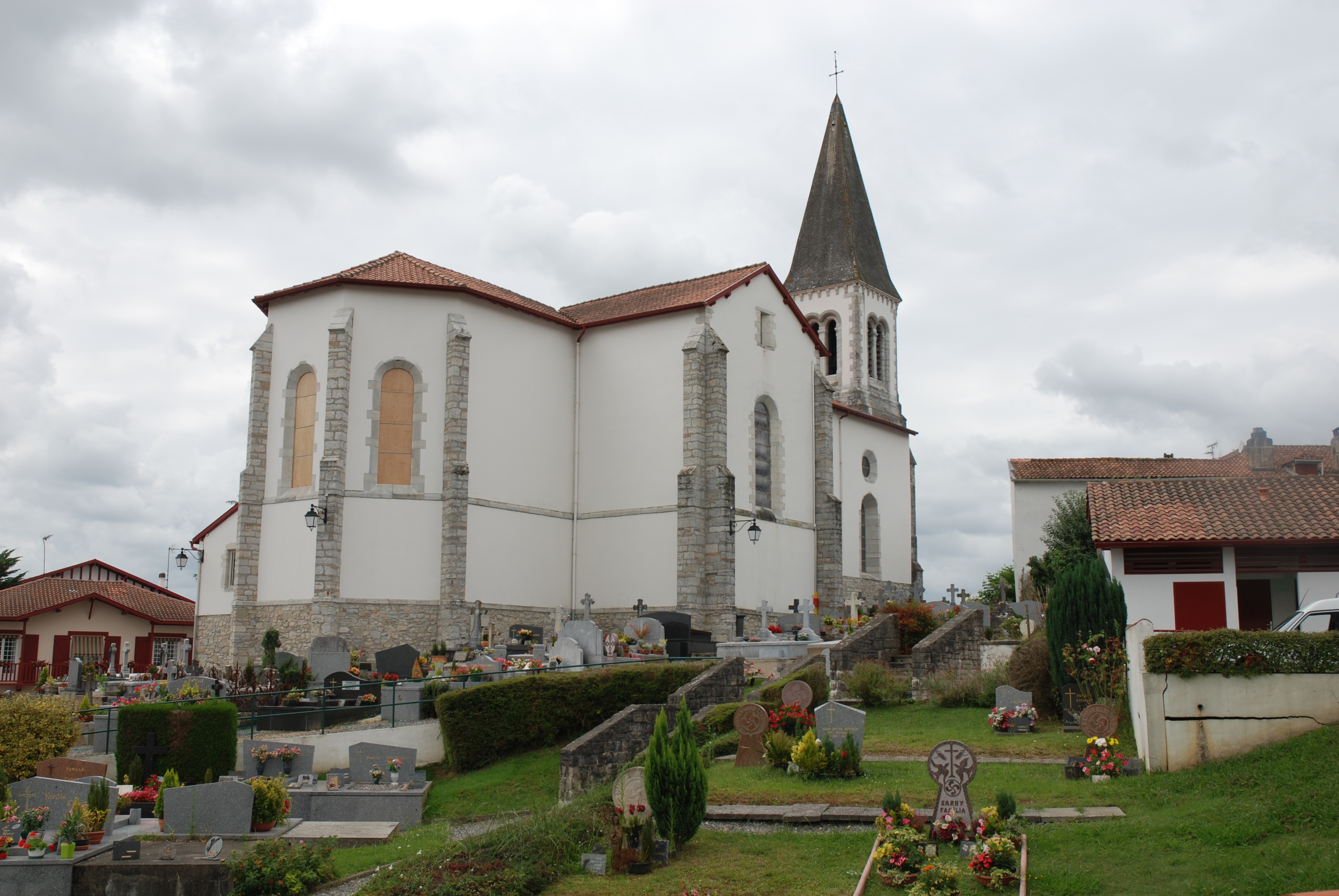
Church.

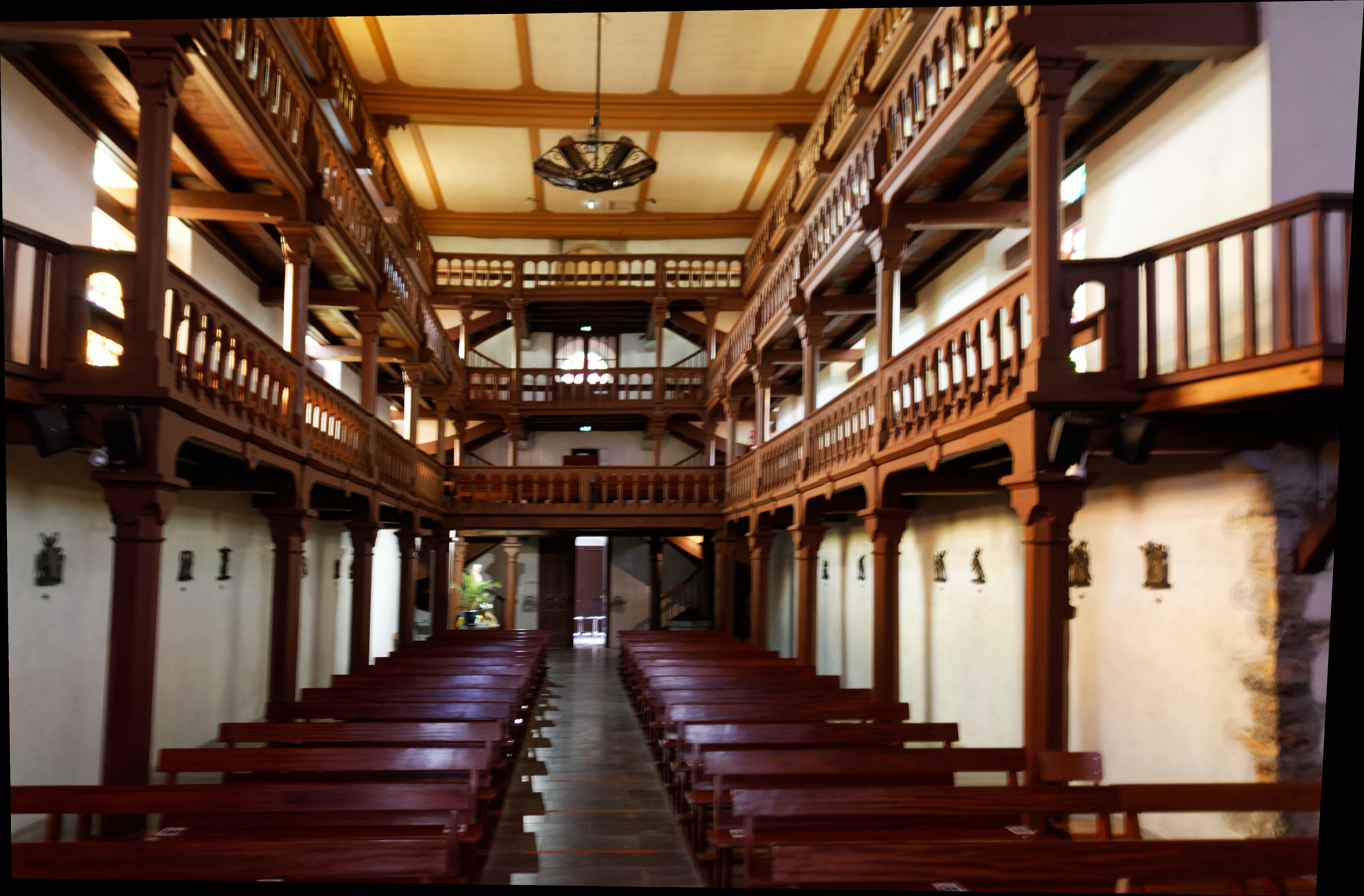

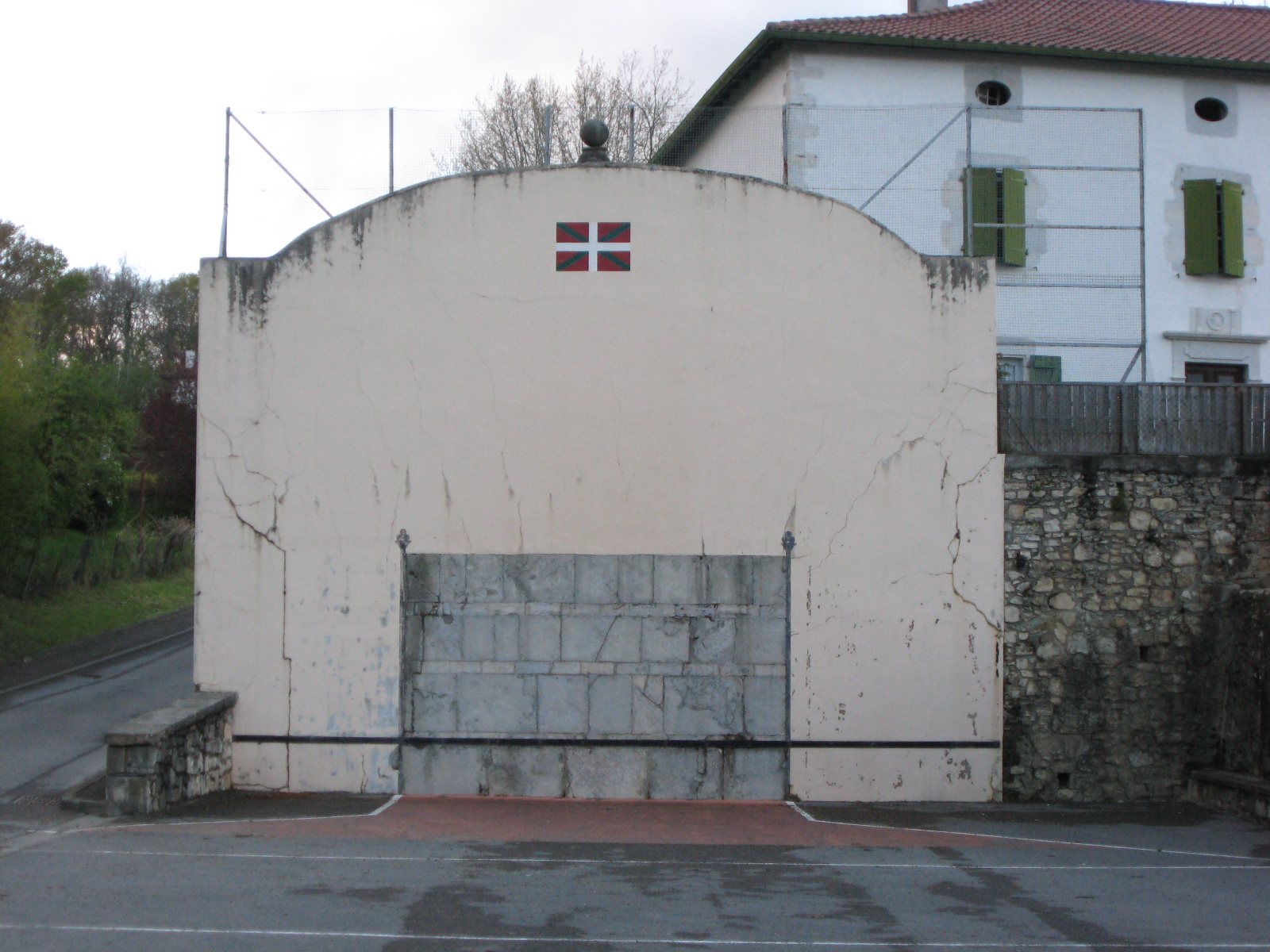
Fronton.

== See also ==
- Communes of the Pyrénées-Atlantiques department
