= Arraute-Charritte =

Arraute-Charritte Arrueta-Sarrikota
- Commune
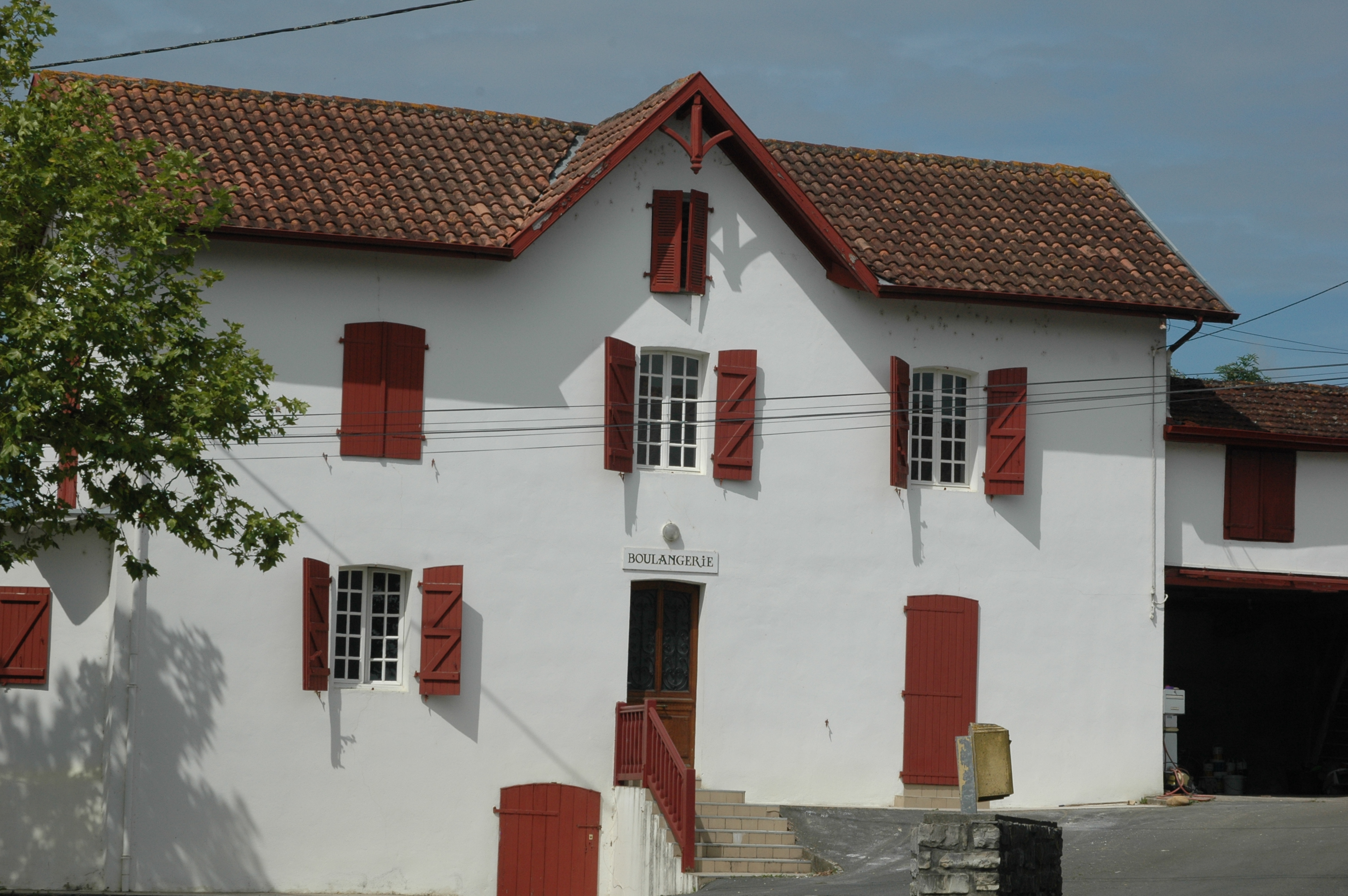
- The Bakery

- Coat of arms
- Location of Arraute-Charritte
- Location within France Location within Nouvelle-Aquitaine
- Coordinates: 43°23′59″N 1°06′20″W
- Country: France
- Region: Nouvelle-Aquitaine
- Department: Pyrénées-Atlantiques
- Arrondissement: Bayonne
- Canton: Pays de Bidache, Amikuze et Ostibarre
- Intercommunality: CA Pays Basque

Government
  - Mayor (2020–2026): Christian Guillemin
- Area^{1}: 22.81 km^{2} (8.81 sq mi)
- Elevation: 60 m (200 ft)
- Highest elevation: 192 m (630 ft)
- Lowest elevation: 8 m (26 ft)
- Population (2023): 440
  - Density: 19/km^{2} (50/sq mi)
- Time zone: UTC+01:00 (CET)
  - Summer (DST): UTC+02:00 (CEST)
- INSEE/Postal code: 64051 /64120
- ^{1} French Land Register data, which excludes lakes, ponds, glaciers > 1 km^{2} (0.386 sq mi or 247 acres) and river estuaries.

Arraute-Charritte (French pronunciation: [aʁot ʃaʁit]; Occitan: Arrauta-Charrita; Basque: Arrueta-Sarrikota) is a commune in the Pyrénées-Atlantiques department in the Nouvelle-Aquitaine region of south-western France.

The inhabitants of the commune are known as Arruetar.

== Geography ==
Arraute-Charritte is located in the former province of Lower Navarre some 40 km east by south-east of Bayonne and 15 km north-west of Saint-Palais. Access to the commune is by the D11 road from Bidache in the north passing through the commune east of the village and continuing to Masparraute in the south. Access to the village is by the D246 from Orègue in the west passing the village then south-west to Masparraute. The D313 also passes down the western border of the commune from the D11 south of Bidache and joins the D246 west of the village. The D310 goes east from the D11 north of the village to Bergouey-Viellenave. There are forests in the north-east and north-west of the commune with a band of patchy forest through the centre. The rest of the commune is farmland.

There is a stop in the commune on bus route 870 from Tardets-Sorholus to Bayonne on the Interurban Network of Pyrénées-Atlantiques.

The Bidouze river forms the north-eastern border of the commune with the Ruisseau de Mandeheguy flowing into it there. Numerous other streams rise all over the commune and flow east to the Bidouze. The Ruiusseau de Bordaberry rises in the north of the commune and flows west to join the Apatharena which forms the western border of the commune and continues north to join the Lihoury. Numerous other streams rise in the commune and flow to the Apatharena.

=== Places and Hamlets ===
- Ameztoya
- Ansobieta
- Aphatepe
- Aphatiague
- Arraute
- Ascoundreguy
- Atchuquia
- Ayenia
- Baratchartia
- Barneto
- Beigtanborda
- Bellevue
- Bellereta
- Bentaberry
- Bertranteguia
- Biscaborda
- Biscagoitia
- Biscaya
- Bissargorry
- Bordaberry
- Bordakoborda
- Bousquets
- Camoussarria
- Charritte
- Charrittounia
- Chilocoa
- Costenenia
- Elhordoy
- Elizondokoborda
- Ermit
- Ermitaborda
- Etchari
- Etchebestia
- Etchemendikoborda
- Etchemendy
- Ithurrongarat
- Fitounia
- Galharreta
- Garatia
- Garaya
- Goihenech
- Grachigno
- Harria
- Héguia
- Iratchet
- Iriatia
- Iribarnia
- Jauregia
- Labenta
- Larralde-Borda
- Borde Larralde
- Larraldia (two places)
- Laxague (ruins)
- Mandio
- Mendiburia
- Manéchans (ruins)
- Millafranque
- Miquelet
- Olheguy
- Oquelargainia
- Othaburia
- Oxobia
- Oyhanburia
- Oyhenart
- Oyhenartia
- Patatouch
- Phagoa
- Borde dou Rey
- Saharcet
- Santacoits
- Sarrailh
- Sorhigarat
- Sorhigaratborda
- Souquirats
- Trouilh
- Urrutia

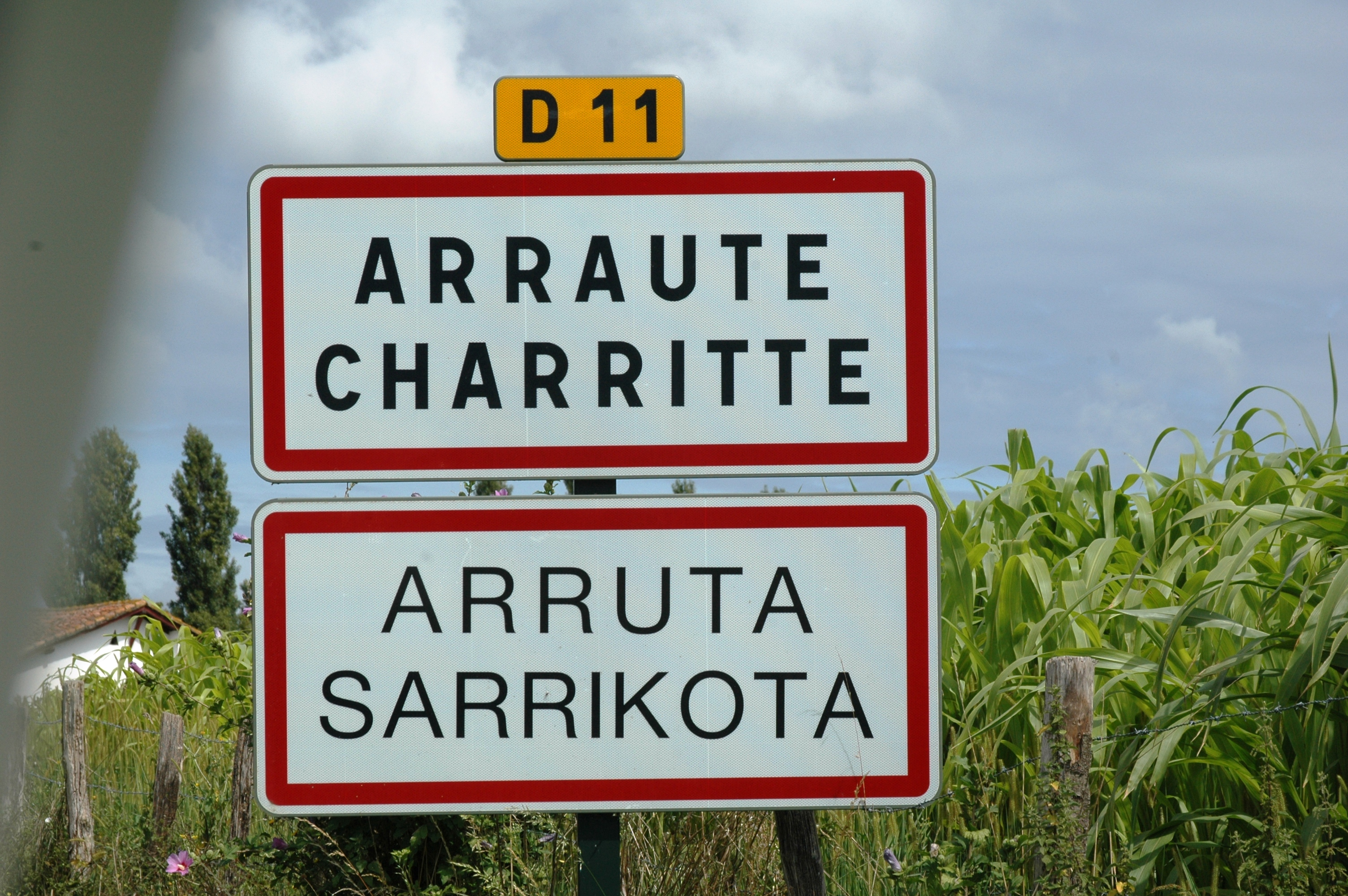
The entrance to Arraute-Charritte on the D11

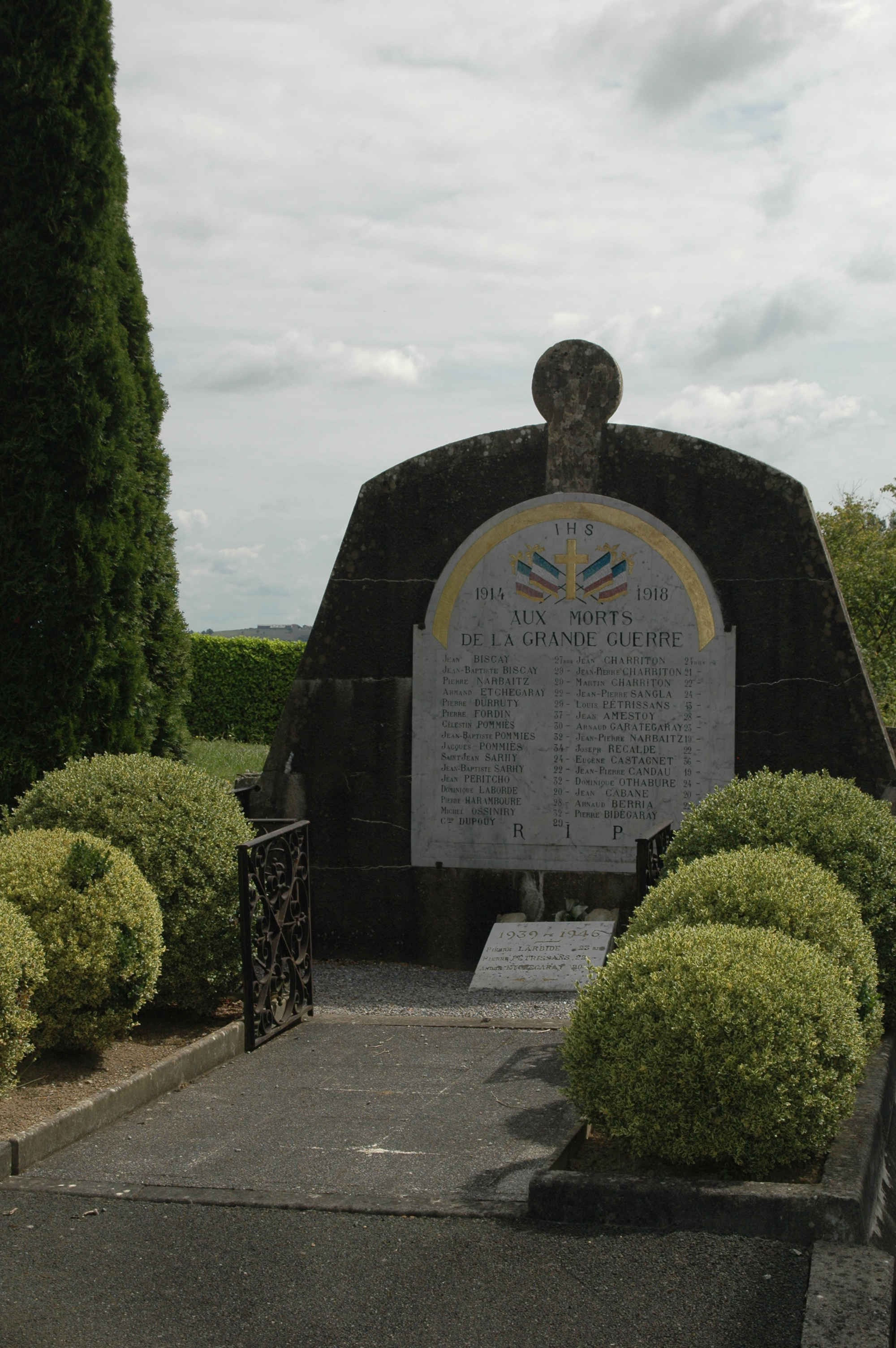
The War Memorial

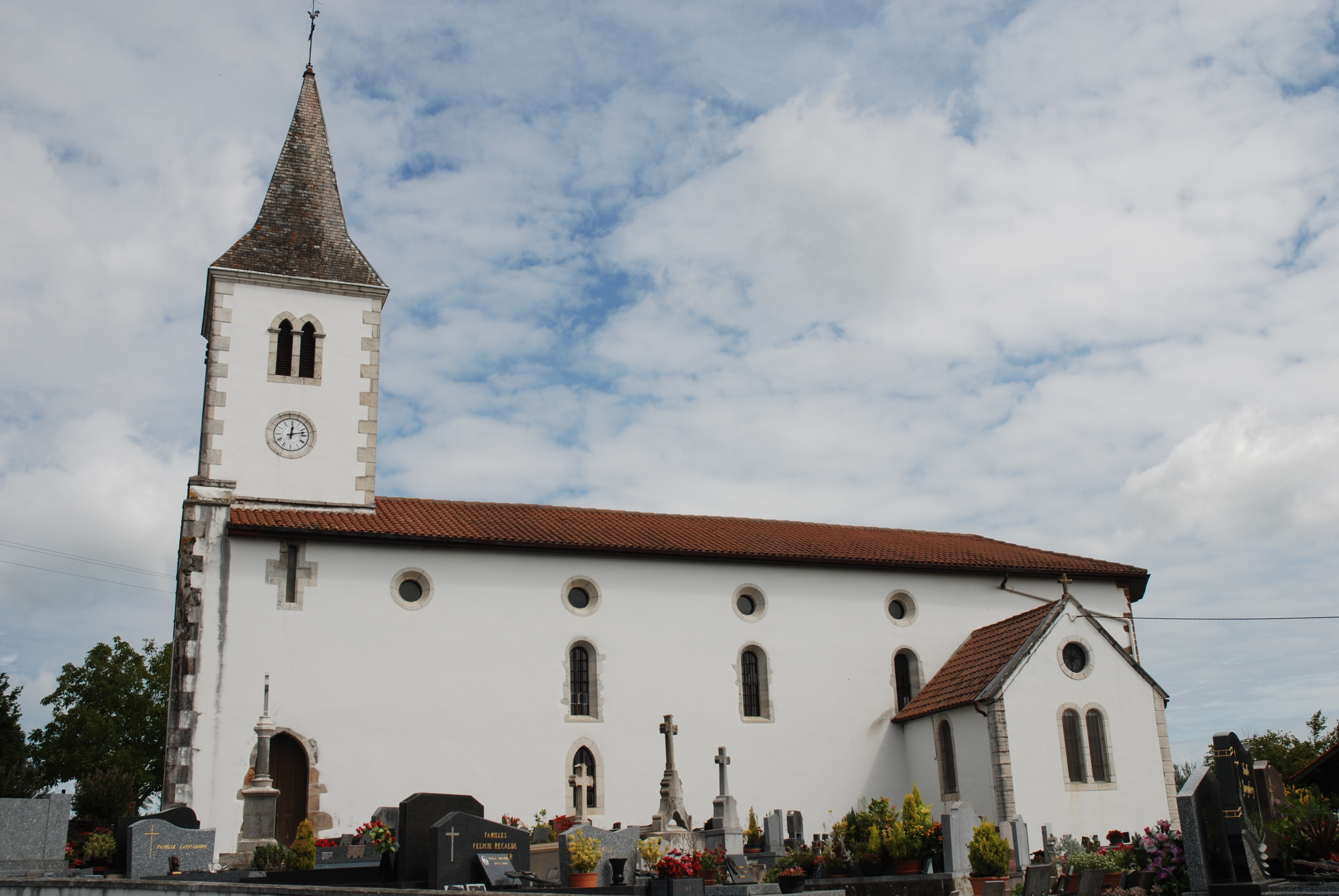
The Church of Saint Pierre

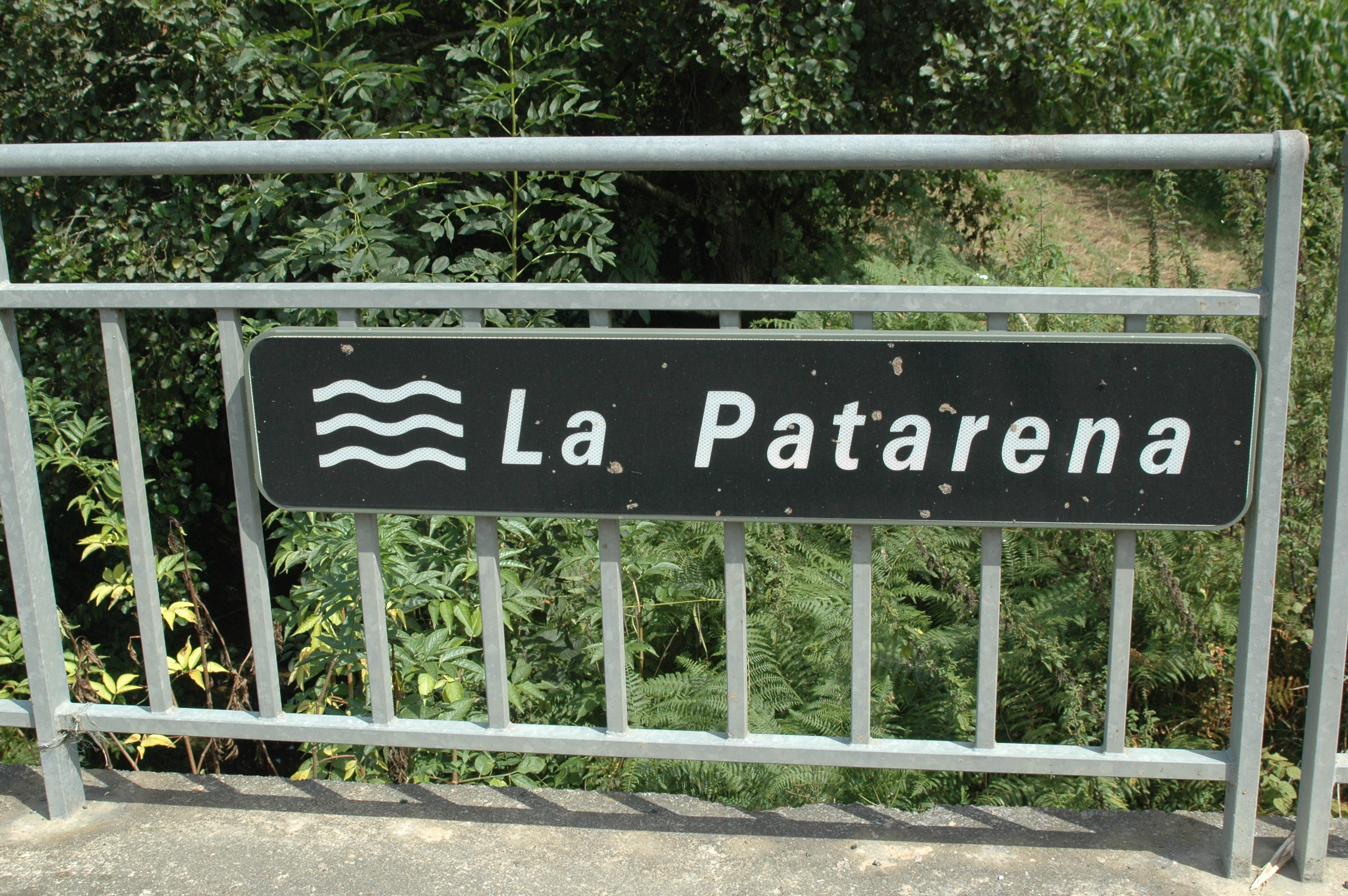
The Pataréna river

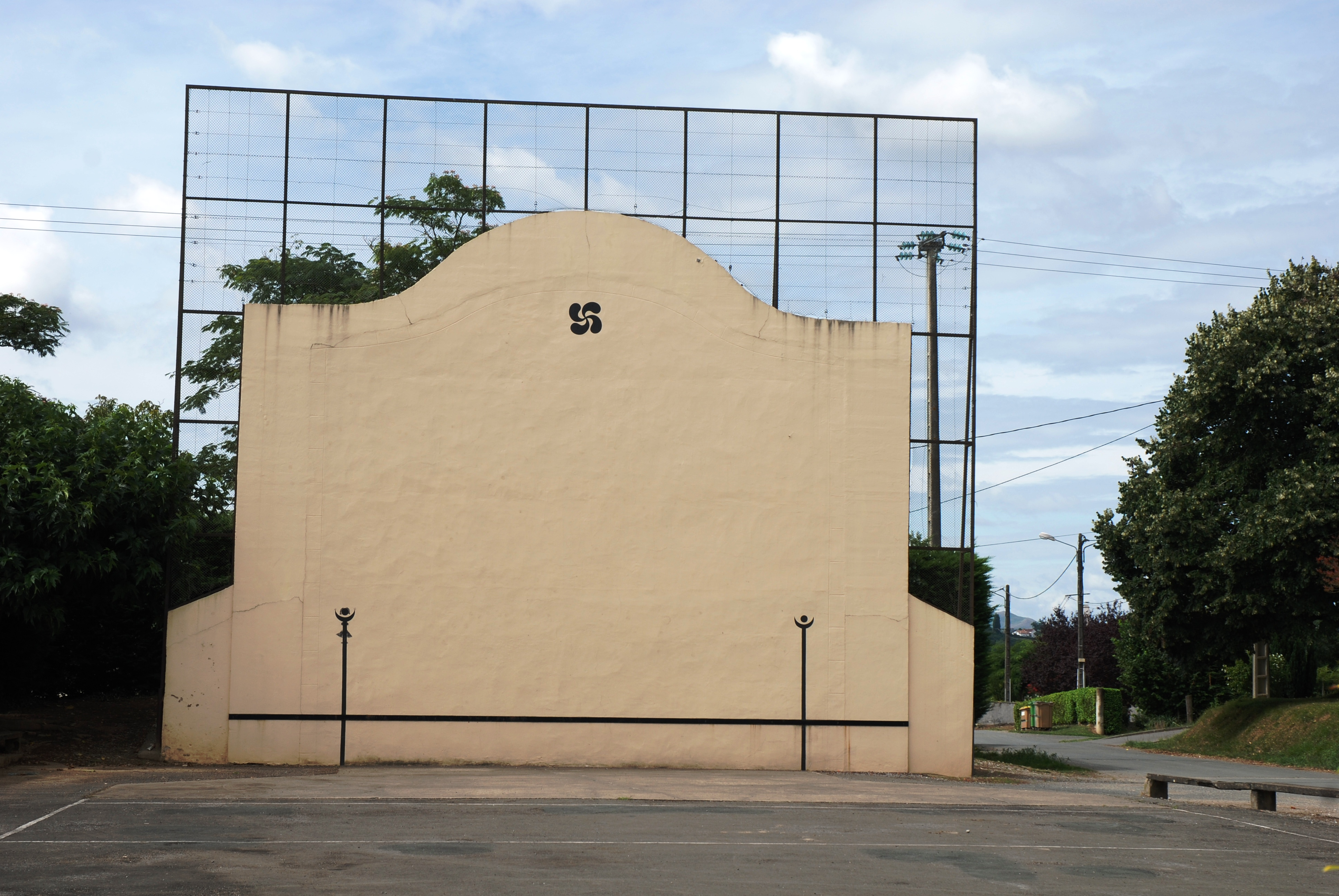
The fronton

== Toponymy ==
The commune name in basque is Arrueta-Sarrikota.

Jean-Baptiste Orpustan indicated that Charrite came from Sarri-ko-(e)ta meaning "place of small bushes". However, there is no certainty of the origin of the name Arraute.

The following table details the origins of the commune name and other names in the commune.

Name	Spelling	Date	Source	Page	Origin	Description
Arraute	Arraute	1125	Orpustan	79		Village
	Sanctus petrus de arraute	1160	Orpustan	79		
	Arrauta	13th century	Raymond	11	Duchesne	
	Araute	1350	Orpustan	79		
	Arraute	1413	Orpustan	79		
	Arrauta	1513	Raymond	11	Pamplona	
	Arruela	1621	Raymond	11	Biscay	
Charritte	Sanctus Joannes de Sarricte	1160	Orpustan	79		Village
	Sarrite	1316	Orpustan	79		
	Ssarriette	1381	Orpustan	79		
	Sarrk oete	1413	Orpustan	79		
	Sarricoata	1513	Raymond	48	Pamplona	
	Charrite	1750	Cassini			
	Charrite	1801	Ldh/EHESS/Cassini		Bulletin des Lois	
Le Coud	Le Coud	1863	Raymond	53		Wood
Éliçaïcine	Éliçaïcine	1863	Raymond	58		Fief of the Kingdom of Navarre
Élicetche	Élicetche	1863	Raymond	58		Fief of the Kingdom of Navarre
Chemin de l'Ermite	Chemin de l'Ermite	1863	Raymond	59		
Ithorrondo	Yturrondo	1621	Raymond	84	Biscay	Farm

Sources:

- Raymond: Topographic Dictionary of the Department of Basses-Pyrenees, 1863, on the page numbers indicated in the table. (in French)
- Orpustan: Jean-Baptiste Orpustan, New Basque Toponymy
- Cassini: Cassini Map from 1750
- Ldh/EHESS/Cassini: Des villages de Cassini aux communes d'aujourd'hui: Commune data sheet Charritte, EHESS (in French).

Origins:

- Duchesne: Duchesne collection volume CXIV
- Pamplona: Titles of Pamplona
- Biscay: Martin Biscay

== History ==
The commune of Arraute and its village, Charritte-Mixe, were merged on 27 June 1842.

=== Heraldry ===
Arms of Arraute-Charritte	Blazon: Vert, a lion Argent.

== Administration ==
List of Successive Mayors

From	To	Name	Party	Position
1995	2001	Robert Gratien		CEO
2001	2026	Christian Guillemin		Driver

=== Inter-communality ===
The commune is part of six inter-communal structures:

- the Communauté d'agglomération du Pays Basque
- the AEP association of Pays de Mixe;
- the educational regrouping association of Amorots-Succos, Arraute-Charritte, Beguios, Masparraute, and Orègue;
- the Energy association of Pyrénées-Atlantiques;
- the inter-communal association for the functioning of schools in Amikuze;
- the association to support Basque culture.

== Demography ==
The population data given in the table and graph below include the former commune of Charritte, absorbed in 1842.

Historical population

Year	Pop.	±% p.a.
1793	536	—
1821	695	+0.93%
1846	735	+0.22%
1872	712	−0.12%
1901	662	−0.25%
1926	535	−0.85%
1946	506	−0.28%
1962	471	−0.45%
1968	444	−0.98%

Year	Pop.	±% p.a.
1975	418	−0.86%
1982	376	−1.50%
1990	365	−0.37%
1999	322	−1.38%
2007	324	+0.08%
2012	388	+3.67%
2017	385	−0.16%
2023	440	+2.25%

Source: EHESS and INSEE

== Economy ==
The town is part of the Appellation d'origine contrôlée (AOC) zone designation of Ossau-iraty.

=== Budget and Taxation ===
- Dwelling Tax: 9.04% (2003)
- Property tax: 6.39% (built properties)
- Business Tax: 7.97%

The local economy is mainly based on agriculture:

- Agriculture: cereals (wheat, barley, corn);
- Viticulture;
- Livestock: cattle, sheep, pigs, geese, and ducks (foie gras);
- Forestry (oak);
- Heliciculture (snail farming).

== Culture and Heritage ==
=== Civil heritage ===
The village is typically Basque and has some Maisons à colombages (timbered houses).

=== Religious heritage ===
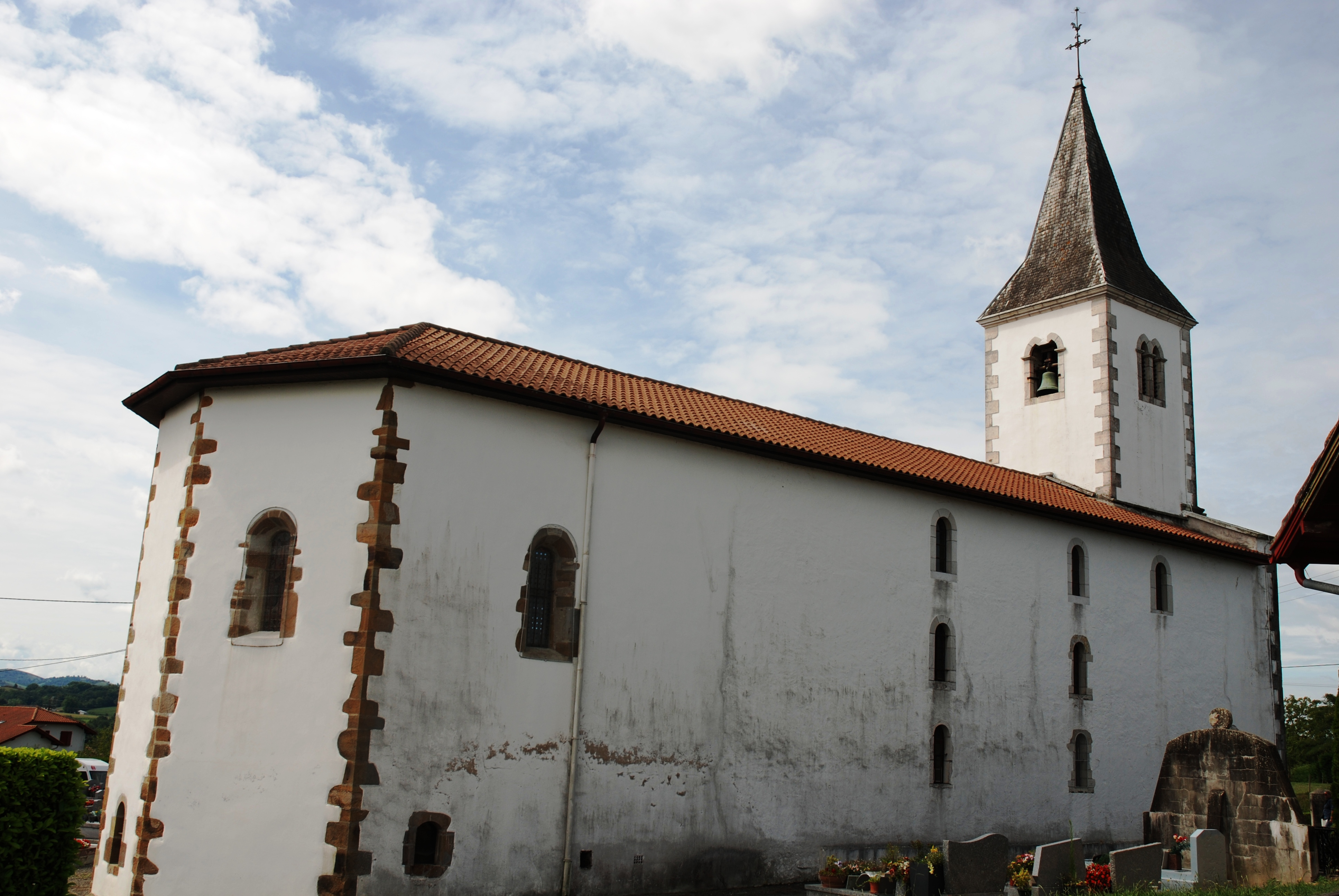
Church of Saint Pierre

- The Parish Church of Saint-Pierre in Arraute (19th century) is registered as an historical monument.
- The Funeral Chapel of Samacoitz is also part of the religious heritage.

=== Environmental heritage ===
The Banks of the Bidouze are classified as a Natura 2000 site.

== Education ==
Amorots-Succos, Masparraute, Orègue, Béguios, and Arraute-Charritte have created together an inter-communal educational grouping (R.P.I. AMOBA).

== See also ==
- Communes of the Pyrénées-Atlantiques department
