= Amorots-Succos =

Amorots-Succos Amorotze-Zokhozü
- Commune
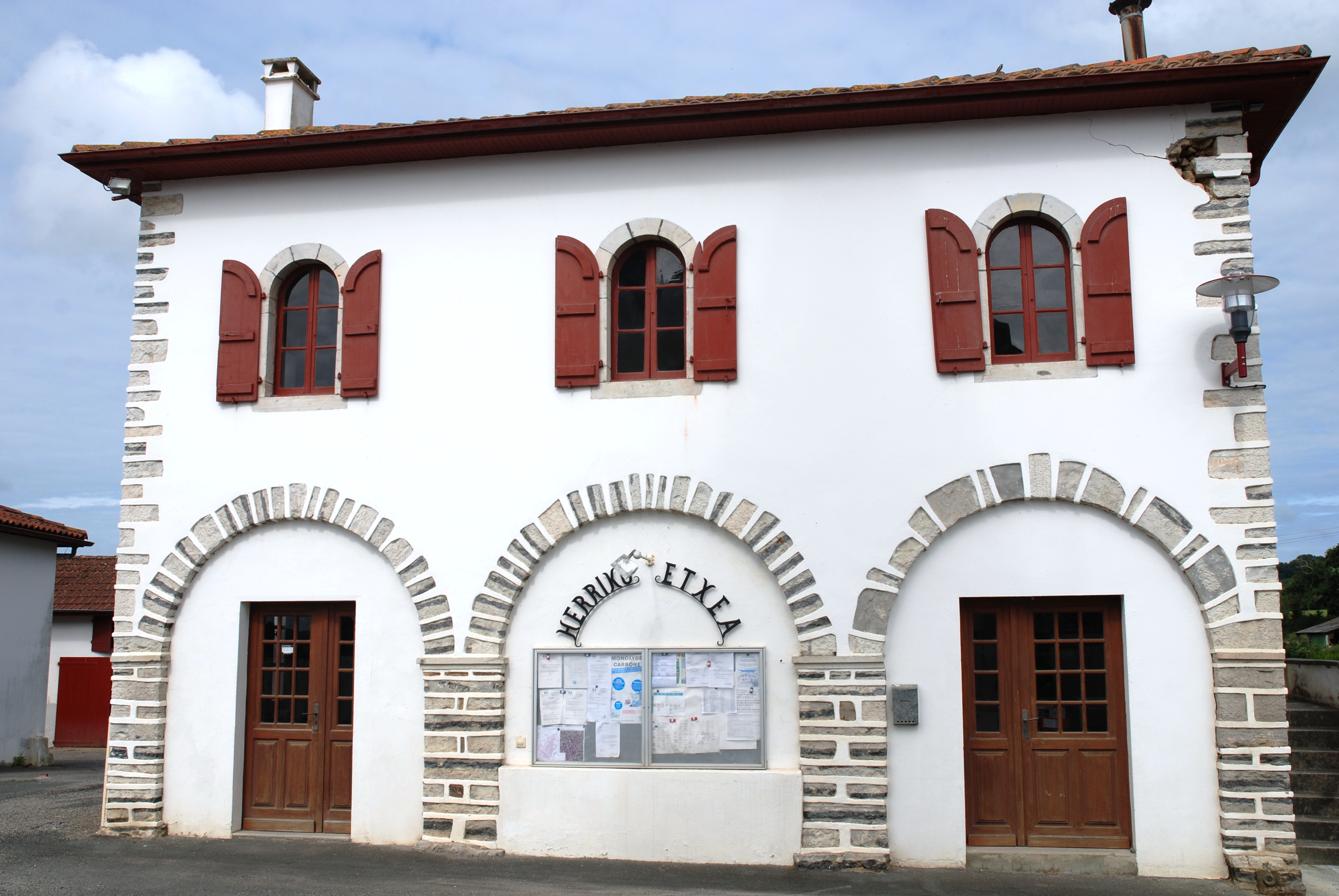
- The Town Hall at Amorots
- Location of Amorots-Succos
- Location within France Location within Nouvelle-Aquitaine
- Coordinates: 43°21′58″N 1°06′39″W
- Country: France
- Region: Nouvelle-Aquitaine
- Department: Pyrénées-Atlantiques
- Arrondissement: Bayonne
- Canton: Pays de Bidache, Amikuze et Ostibarre
- Intercommunality: Pays Basque

Government
  - Mayor (2020–2026): Arnaud Abbadie
- Area^{1}: 15.20 km^{2} (5.87 sq mi)
- Elevation: 104 m (341 ft)
- Highest elevation: 266 m (873 ft)
- Lowest elevation: 65 m (213 ft)
- Population (2023): 219
  - Density: 14.4/km^{2} (37.3/sq mi)
- Time zone: UTC+01:00 (CET)
  - Summer (DST): UTC+02:00 (CEST)
- INSEE/Postal code: 64019 /64120
- ^{1} French Land Register data, which excludes lakes, ponds, glaciers > 1 km^{2} (0.386 sq mi or 247 acres) and river estuaries.

Amorots-Succos (Occitan: Amoròs-Sucòs; Basque: Amorotze-Zokhozü) is a commune in the Pyrénées-Atlantiques department in the Nouvelle-Aquitaine region of southwestern France.

The inhabitants of the commune are known as Amoroztar in Basque.

== Geography ==
Amorots-Succos is located some 50 km east by south-east of Bayonne and 10 km north-west of Saint-Palais in the former Basque province of Lower Navarre. It can be accessed by the D123 road from Beguios in the east passing west through the village and the commune and continuing to La Bastide-Clairence. The D14 from Meharin to Garris also passes through the southern tip of the commune. The commune is mixed forest and farmland with no other villages or hamlets.

=== Hydrography ===
Numerous streams rise and flow through the commune including the Ruisseau d'Isaac Berds which forms part of the western border and flows to the Laharanne which eventually joins the Lihoury far to the north, the Jelesseko Erika forming the south-eastern border, the Ruisseau de Cherrits in the south, the Ruisseau d'Otherguy, and many other unnamed streams.

=== Places and Hamlets ===
- Aguerréa
- Ameztoya (ruins)
- Amiasorhoa
- Ansobieta
- Apatia
- Apetchéko Borda
- Arangoïza
- Arangoïzgaraya
- Arrabichta
- Berdeko Borda
- Berhuéta
- Bertrahandy
- Bibens
- Bidamberrita
- Bidegain-de-Gain
- Bidegain-de-Pé
- Biscayluzia
- Bordaberria
- Cachantéguy
- Carricaburua
- Chastriaborda (ruins)
- Culuteguia
- Damassia
- Ehulondoa
- Errékaldéa
- Errékartéa
- Etchebérria
- Etcheverria
- Etorania
- Garatéa
- Garateko Borda
- Haranéa
- Ichobox
- Ichorotzia
- Idiartia
- Iratzéburia
- Isaac-Borda
- Jauberria
- Jelosséa
- Joanteguia
- Kakila
- Kurku
- Larraldéa (2 places)
- Larréa
- Lascouéta
- Laurenzenia
- Legarria
- Miscoria
- Olha
- Olhakoborda
- Olharanne
- Ospilatéa
- Oxarania
- Pacharreta
- Padagoya
- Sarhia
- Sékailénia
- Sorhuéta
- Succos
- Tipulatéya
- Uhaldia

== Toponymy ==
Brigitte Jobbé-Duval proposed a forest origin for Amorots meaning "the land of oaks". Succos derives from the Basque zoko meaning "isolated country".

The current spelling in Basque is Amorotze-Zokotze. Pierre Lhande, in his Basque-French Dictionary, indicated the spelling Sokueze for Succos.

The following table details the origins of the commune name and other names in the commune.

Name	Spelling	Date	Source	Page	Origin	Description
Amorots	Sanctus Vicentius de Maroz	1160	Orpustan			Village
	Maroth	1160	Orpustan			
	Morotz	1160	Orpustan			
	Amoros	1268	Orpustan			
	Amarotz	1305	Orpustan			
	Amarotz	1306	Orpustan			
	Amaroz	1350	Orpustan			
	Amoroz	1402	Raymond	5	Chapter	
	Amorotz	1413	Orpustan			
	Amorotz	1513	Raymond	5	Pamplona	
Succos	Sanctus Martinus de Trussecalau	1160	Orpustan			Village
	Sucox	1268	Orpustan			
	Succos	1304	Orpustan			
	Ssucos	1350	Orpustan			
	Çucoz	1413	Orpustan			
	Suquos	1513	Raymond	164	Pamplona	
Croix Goïty	Croix Goïty	1863	Raymond	72		Shrine
Croix d'Ichorox	Croix d'Ichorox	1863	Raymond	81		Shrine
Ospitaléa	Zabala y l’Ospital	1513	Raymond	127	Pamplona	Farm with a small chapel nearby dependent on the Commandery of Irissary
	L'Hopital d'Amorots	1708	Raymond	127	Irissarry	
	Ospital	1863	Raymond	127		
Troussecaillau	Troussecaillau	1863	Raymond	169		Fief, vassal of the Kingdom of Navarre

Sources:

- Orpustan: Jean-Baptiste Orpustan, New Basque Toponymy
- Raymond: Topographic Dictionary of the Department of Basses-Pyrenees, 1863, on the page numbers indicated in the table. (in French)

Origins:

- Chapter: Chapter of Soule
- Pamplona: Titles of Pamplona
- Irissarry: Regulations of the Commandry of Irissarry (in French)

== History ==
The village of Succos was united with Amorots on 16 August 1841.

== Administration ==
List of Successive Mayors

From	To	Name
1995	2026	Arnaud Abbadie

== Inter-Communality ==
The commune belongs to six inter-communal associations:

- The Communauté d'agglomération du Pays Basque
- the AEP Association of Mixe Country
- the Energy Association of Pyrénées-Atlantiques
- the inter-communal association for the operation of schools in Amikuze
- the Association to promote Basque culture
- the educational grouping association for Amorots-Succos, Arraute-Charritte, Béguios, Masparraute, and Orègue

== Demography ==
In 1350 there were 5 fires at Amorots and 10 at Succos.

The fiscal census of 1412-1413 carried out on the orders of Charles III of Navarre compared to the census of 1551 of men and arms that are present in the Kingdom of Navarre on this side of the ports revealed a population in high growth. The first census showed 4 fires at Amorots while the second showed 13 (12 + 1 secondary fire). The same at Succos: the first census showed 5 fires and the second 19 (16 + 3 secondary fires).

The census of the population of Lower Navarre in 1695 counted 40 fires at Amorots and 32 at Succos. The total at the 1758 census was 74 fires at Amorots.

Historical population

Year	Pop.	±% p.a.
1793	305	—
1821	363	+0.62%
1836	330	−0.63%
1846	462	+3.42%
1872	396	−0.59%
1901	356	−0.37%
1926	356	+0.00%
1946	324	−0.47%
1962	267	−1.20%

Year	Pop.	±% p.a.
1968	249	−1.16%
1975	244	−0.29%
1982	267	+1.30%
1990	222	−2.28%
1999	204	−0.94%
2007	218	+0.83%
2012	235	+1.51%
2017	232	−0.26%
2023	219	−0.96%

Source: EHESS and INSEE

From 1793 to 1836 the population above was only for Amorots which was separate from Succos. The population for Succos for that period is shown below:

Historical population of Succos
Year	Pop.	±% p.a.
1793	129	—
1800	118	−1.27%
1806	126	+1.10%
1821	125	−0.05%
1831	133	+0.62%
1836	144	+1.60%
Source: EHESS

== Economy ==
The commune forms part of the Appellation d'origine contrôlée (AOC) zone of Ossau-iraty.

== Culture and Heritage ==
=== Languages ===
According to the Map of the Seven Basque Provinces published in 1863 by Prince Louis-Lucien Bonaparte the dialect of Basque spoken in Amendeuix-Oneix is eastern low Navarrese.

=== Religious Heritage ===
Two religious sites in the commune are registered as historical monuments:

- The Church of Saint-Martin of Succos, Cemetery, and old Guardhouse (12th century), The cemetery wall serves as a fronton.
- The Parish Church of Saint Luce (1880) at Amorots.

=== Picture Gallery ===
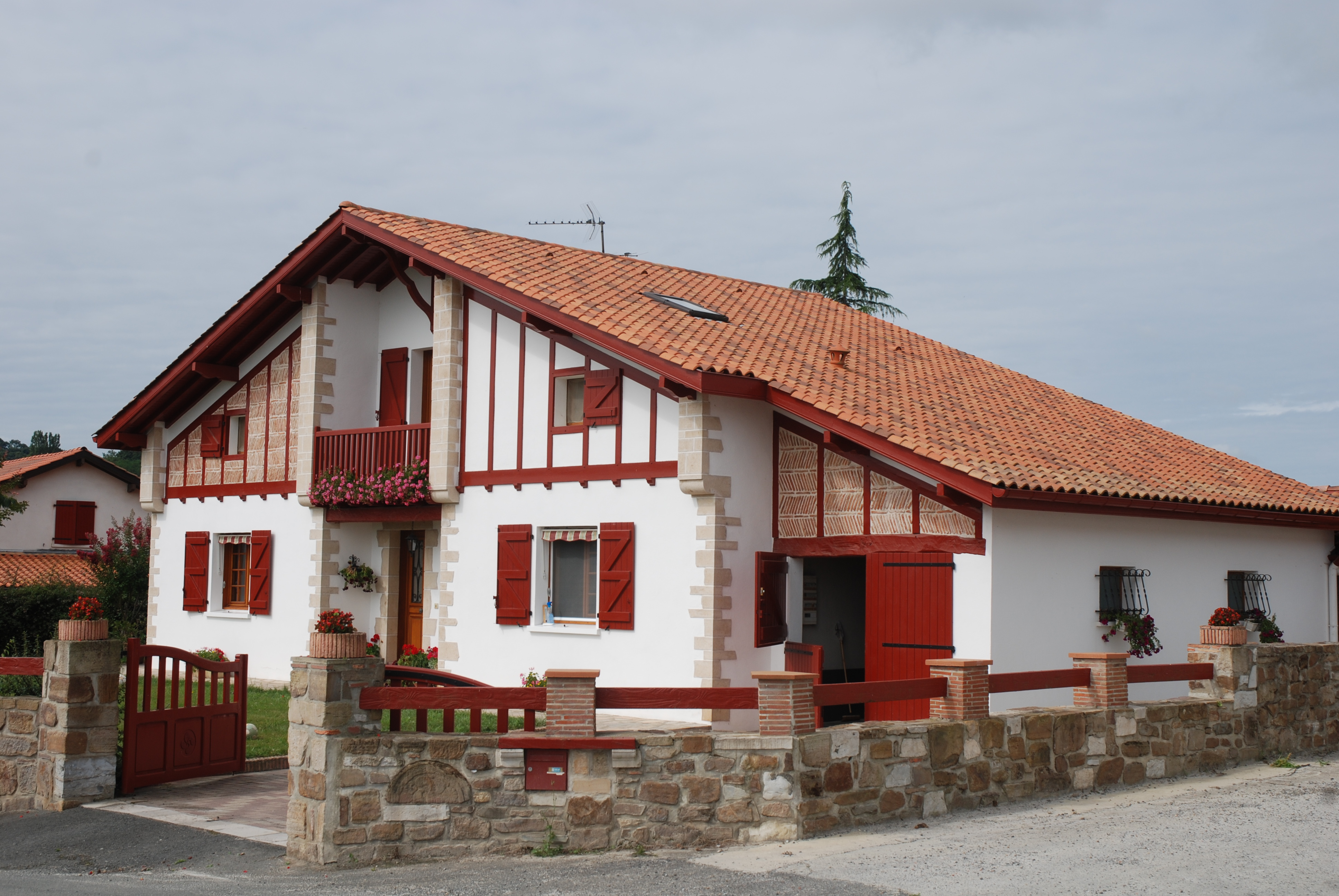
A farm at Amorots

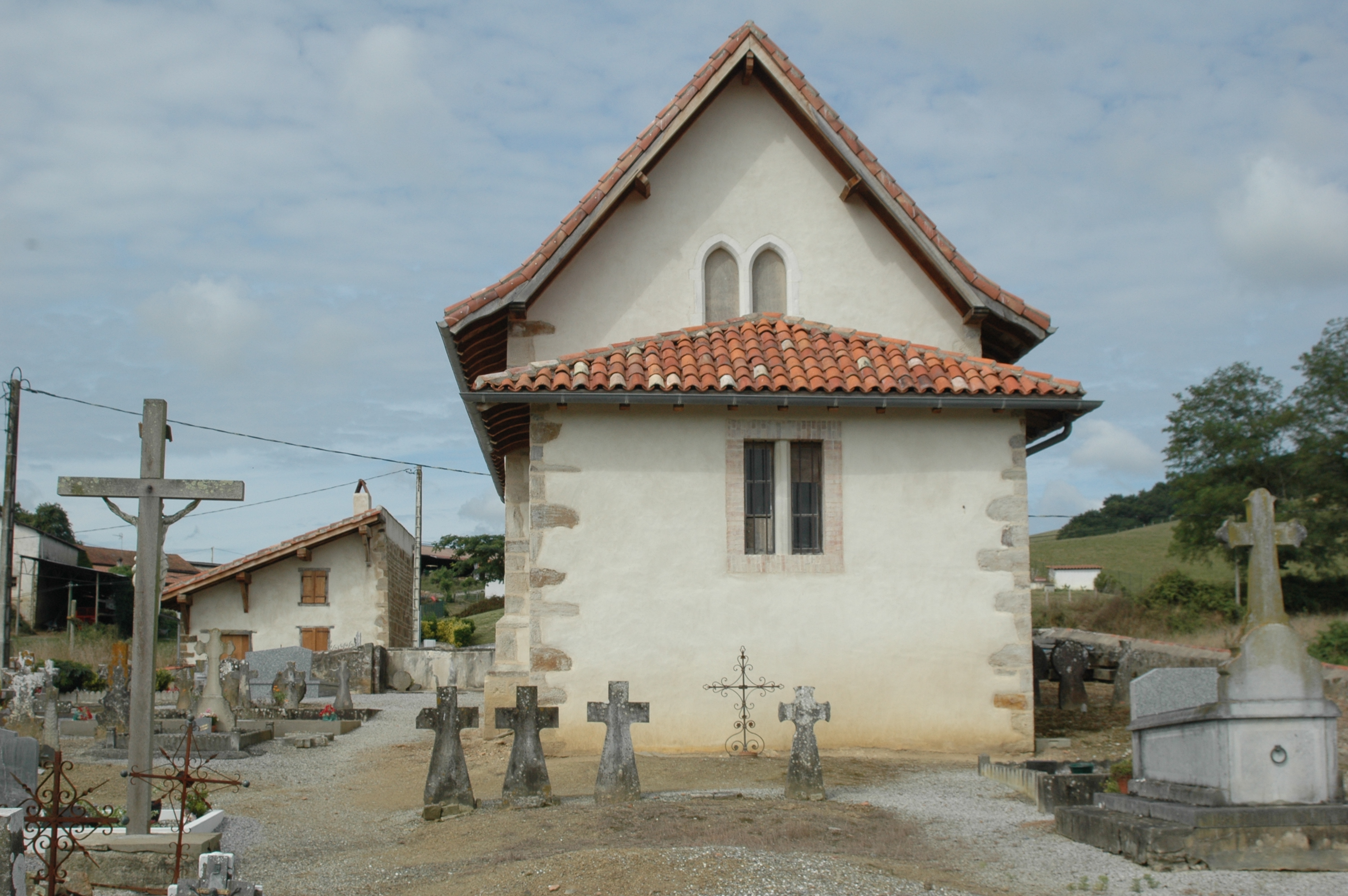
The church at Succos with, at left foreground, the Basque cemetery and its Fronton

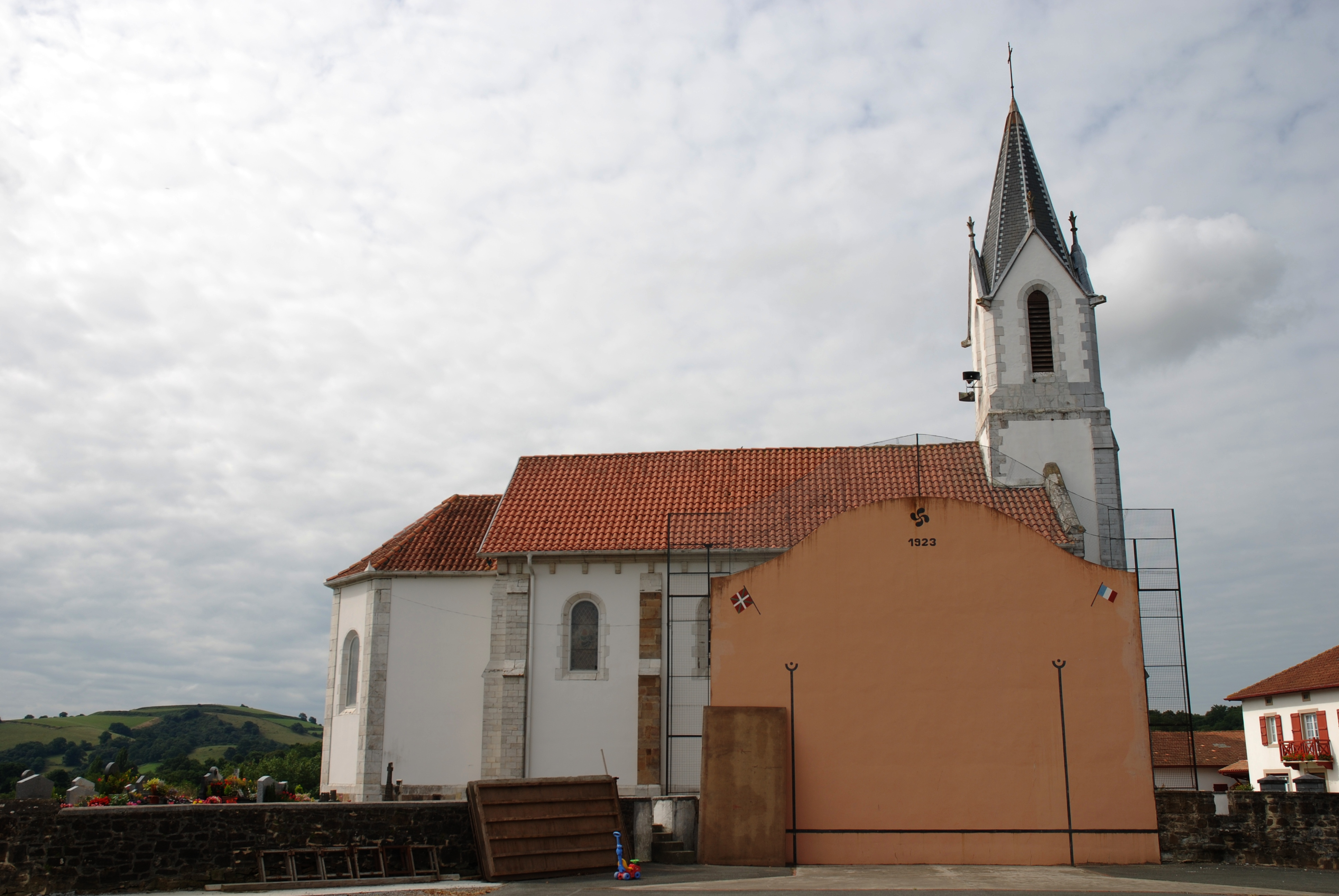
The Saint Luce Church at Amorots and its fronton

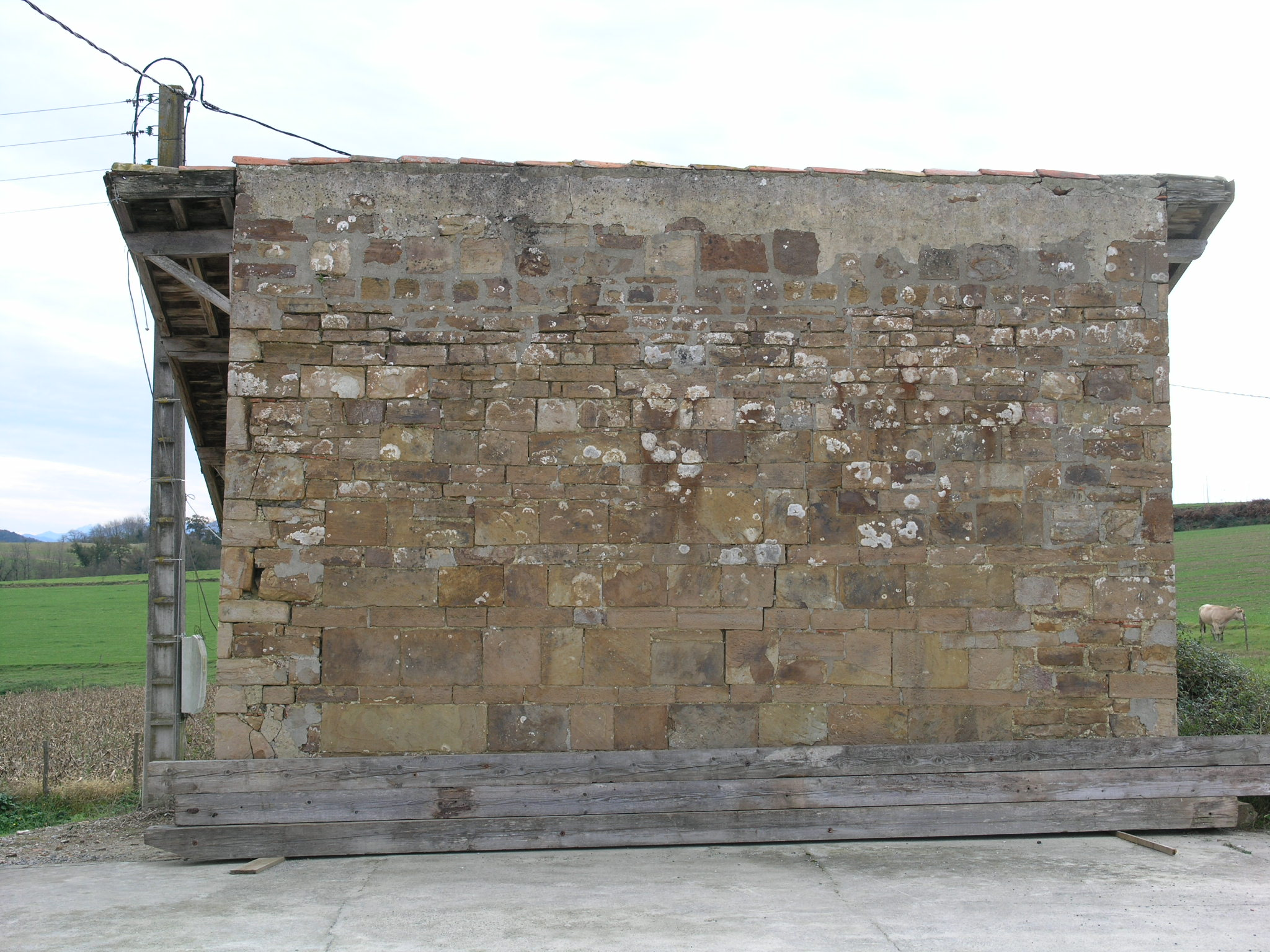
A fronton at Succos

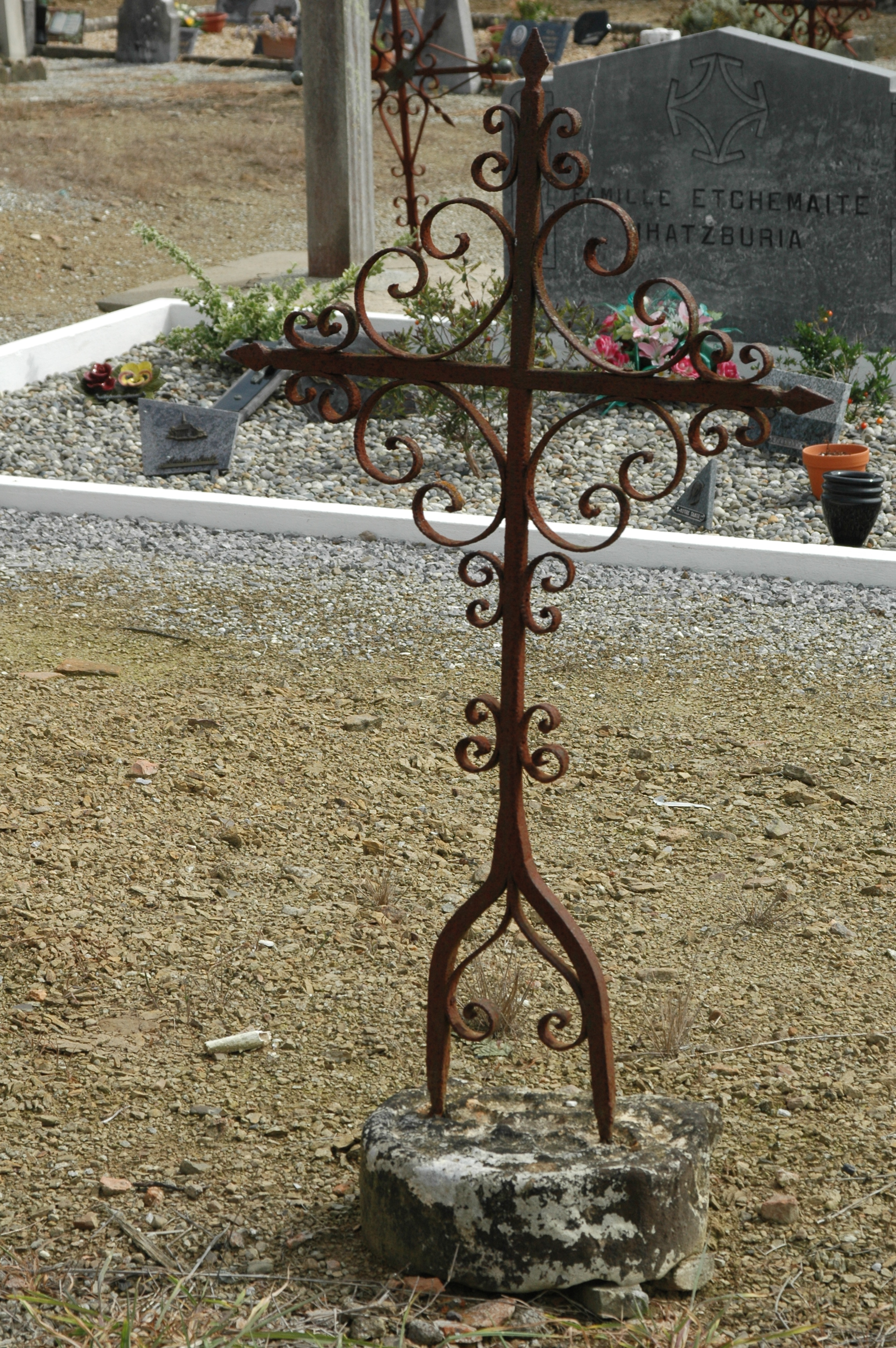
A Hilarri with a cross at Succos

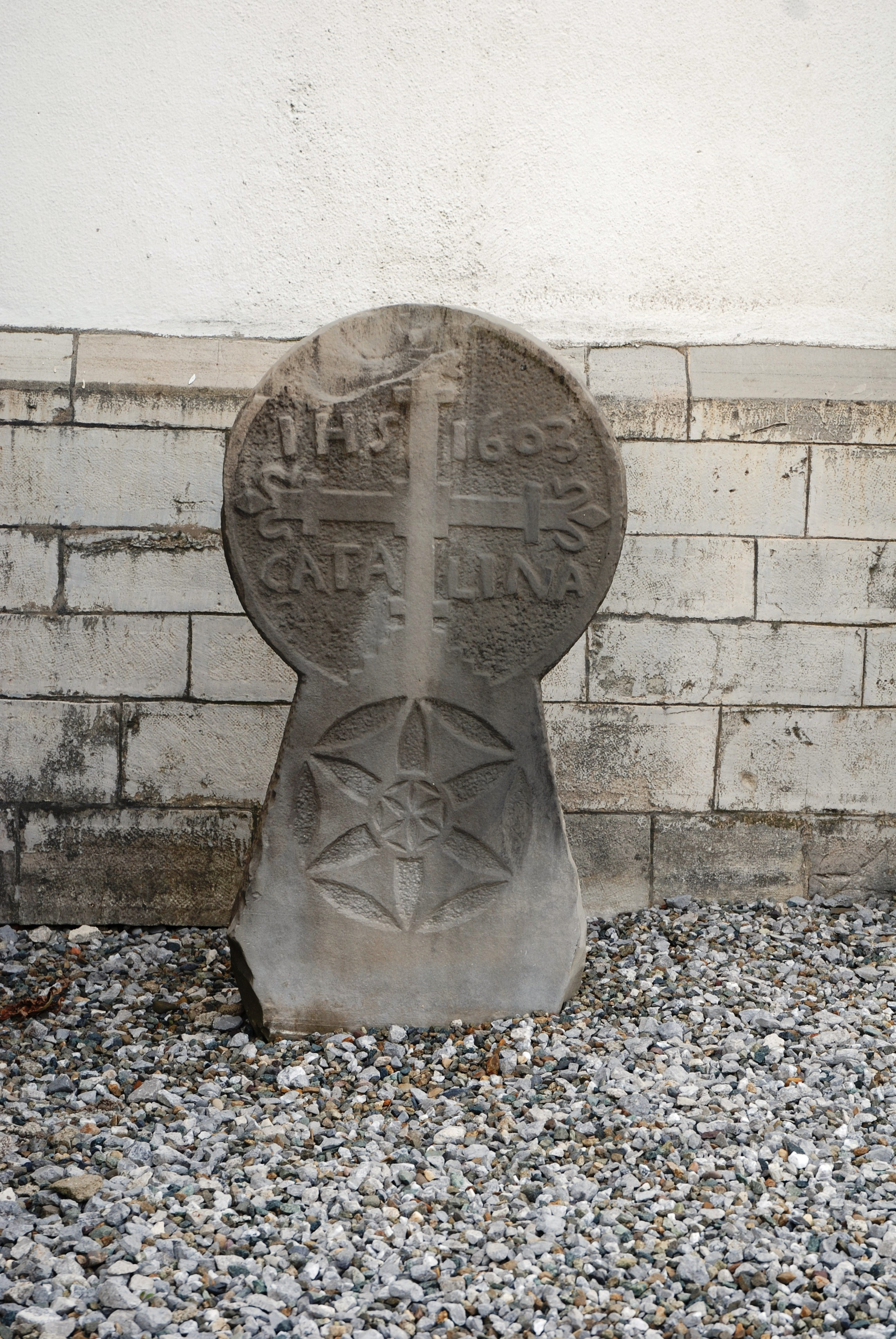
Hilarri at Amorots

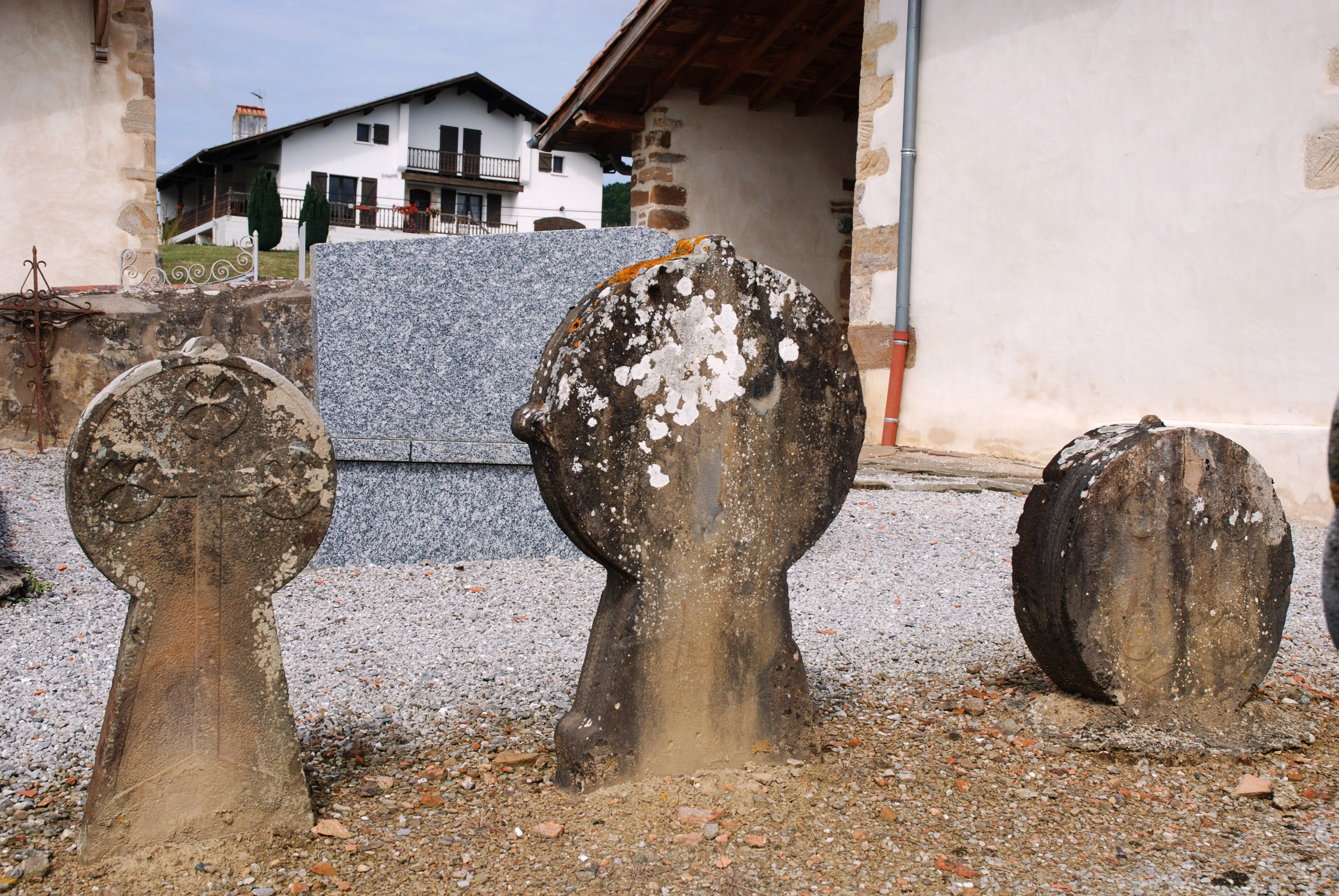
Hilarri at the Succos cemetery

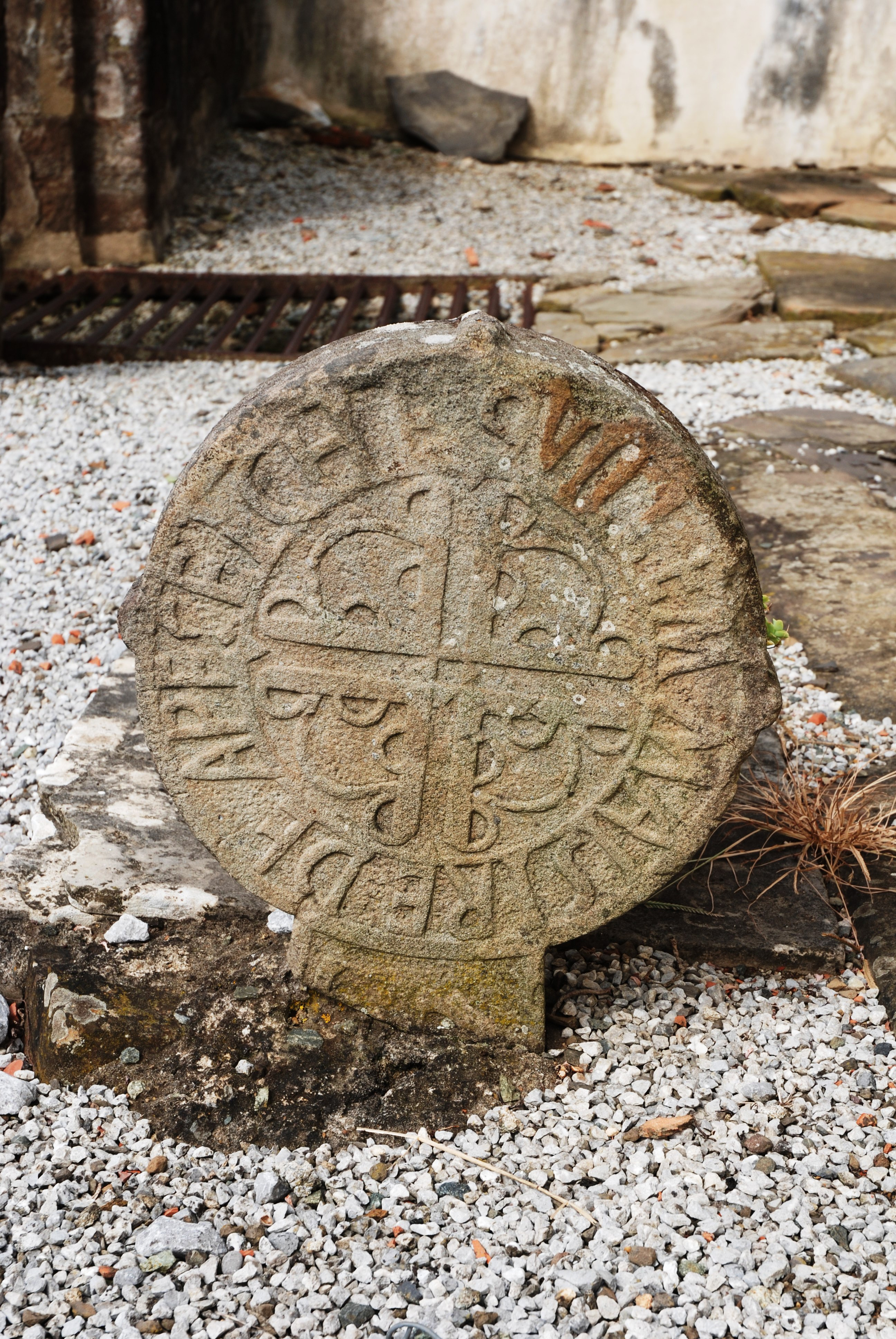
Hilarri at Succos

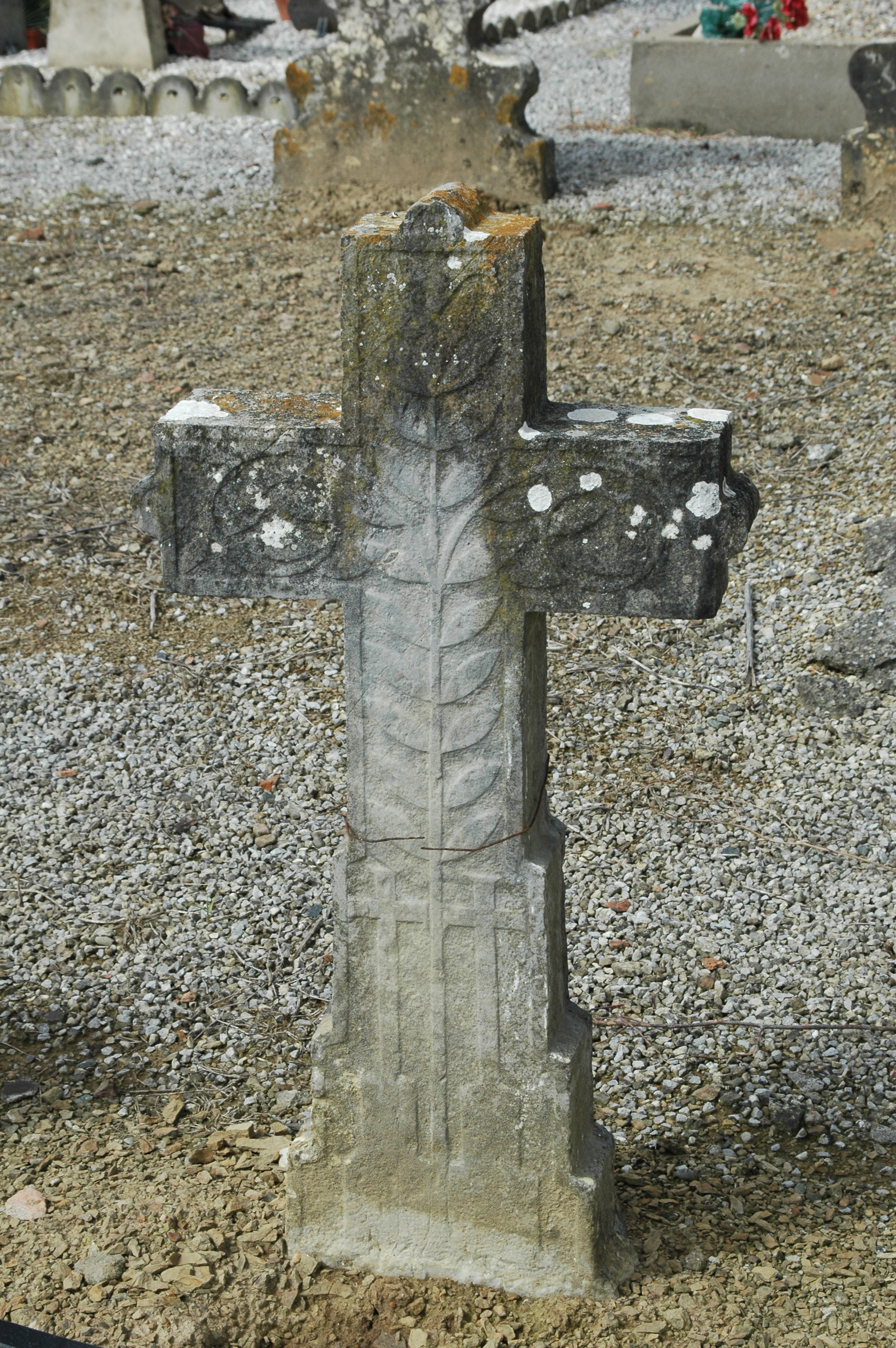
Basque hilarri at Succos

== Facilities ==
Education
Amorots-Succos, Masparraute, Orègue, Béguios, and Arraute-Charritte are associated through an educational regrouping (R.P.I. AMOBA)

== See also ==
- Communes of the Pyrénées-Atlantiques department
