= Arancou =

Arancou Erango
- Commune
- Coat of arms
- Location of Arancou
- Location within France Location within Nouvelle-Aquitaine
- Coordinates: 43°26′41″N 1°02′59″W
- Country: France
- Region: Nouvelle-Aquitaine
- Department: Pyrénées-Atlantiques
- Arrondissement: Bayonne
- Canton: Pays de Bidache, Amikuze et Ostibarre
- Intercommunality: CA Pays Basque

Government
  - Mayor (2020–2026): Alexandre Bordes
- Area^{1}: 5.30 km^{2} (2.05 sq mi)
- Elevation: 61 m (200 ft)
- Highest elevation: 142 m (466 ft)
- Lowest elevation: 12 m (39 ft)
- Population (2023): 187
  - Density: 35.3/km^{2} (91.4/sq mi)
- Time zone: UTC+01:00 (CET)
  - Summer (DST): UTC+02:00 (CEST)
- INSEE/Postal code: 64031 /64270
- ^{1} French Land Register data, which excludes lakes, ponds, glaciers > 1 km^{2} (0.386 sq mi or 247 acres) and river estuaries.

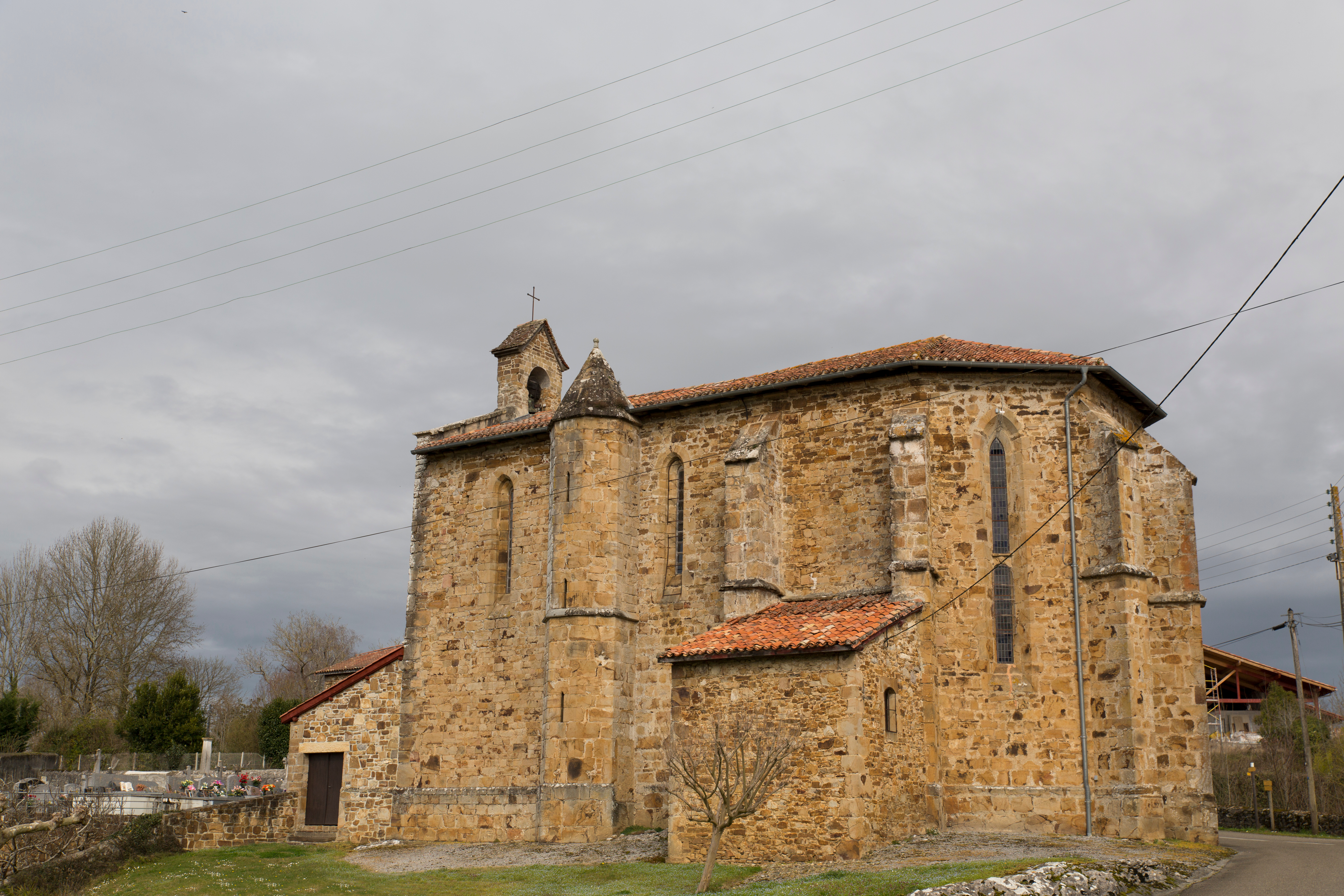
Arancou - Église

Arancou (French pronunciation: [aʁɑ̃ku]; Basque: Erango; Occitan: Aranco) is a commune in the Pyrénées-Atlantiques department in southwestern France.

It is located in the former province of Lower Navarre.

== Geography ==
=== Hydrography ===
The Lauhirasse, a tributary of the Bidouze, and the Baniou, a tributary of the Gave de Pau cross this commune.

=== Hamlets ===
- Garai
- Le Burrou
- Xabai

=== Bordering communes ===
- Came to the Northwest
- Labastide-Villefranche to the East
- Bergouey-Viellenave to the Southwest

== Toponymy ==
The Gascon name for "Arancou" is Arancon; the Basque name is Erango.

The name Arancou appears in the forms Arranque (1119–1136), Arancoen (13th century), Arancoey, Arancoenh (around 1360), Arrancoeynh, Arancoinh (1372), Aranquoen (1403, titles of Came), and Aranco (1584, alienation of the Diocese of Dax).

The name of Arancou comes from the Basque arangoien, for "higher valley".

== History ==
=== Prehistory ===
Tools from the Magdalenian era, one of the later cultures of the Upper Paleolithic era of Western Europe, were found in the Bourrouillan cave in the territory of Arancou. Several thousand bones from hunted animals were found in the cave, as well as thousands of flint and bone tools.

=== Modern history ===
On January 1, 1973, the communes of Arancou, Bergouey, and Viellenave-sur-Bidouze were joined. On 15 November 1977, Arancou regained its independent status, while Bergouey and Viellenave-sur-Bidouze remained together as Bergouey-Viellenave.

=== Arancou and Basque country ===
Jean-Baptiste Orpustan mentions Arancou in 1309 in a list of parishes paying dues to the royal power in Navarrenx. Arancou was also mentioned by Eugène Goyheneche towards the end of the Middle Ages. He wrote that "because of the Gramont's power, [the situation of the neighboring parishes, including Arancou] is ambiguous."

However, starting with the modern age, no evidence of Arancou's allegiance to the Kingdom of Navarre can be found. Nor is there evidence of any links to the dukedom of Gramont or of the sovereign principality of Bidache. The chapter of the collegiate Saint-Jacques de Bidache was the lord of the lands; the parish was situated in France in the administrative district of Lannes, where it came under the control of the administrative region of Hastingues.

Although Arancou falls without a doubt within modern districting, it is nonetheless included in a list of the communes of Basse-Navarre. While presenting the town in 2009 on his website, the mayor, Alexandre Bordes, did not take sides. Rather, he emphasized the "mix of deep-rooted cultures" and the "location of the town at the borders of Gascogne, Béarn, Basque Country, and the Navarre." His website describes the town as "basquo-béarnais."

== Administration ==
List of Mayors

Elected	End of term	Name
1995	2001	Alexandre Bordes
2001	2008	Alexandre Bordes
2008	2014	Alexandre Bordes

=== Intercommunality ===
Arancou belongs to four different intercommunal territories:

- The Communauté d'agglomération du Pays Basque
- The Adour Syndicate
- Syndicate AEP of Arancou - Bergouey-Viellenave - Bidache - Labastide-Villefranche
- Syndicate for the department of electricity

== Population ==
Historical population
Year	Pop.	±% p.a.
1968	145	—
1975	124	−2.21%
1982	122	−0.23%
1990	122	+0.00%
1999	108	−1.35%
2007	101	−0.83%
2012	134	+5.82%
2017	162	+3.87%
2023	187	+2.42%
Source: INSEE

== Economy ==
Arancou's economy is primarily agricultural. Arancou is part of the Appellation d'origine contrôlée (a French regional certification) of the cheese, Ossau-Iraty.

There is a limestone quarry in Arancou. Until 1993, it provided the stone for the cemetery, Ciments de l'Adour, in Boucau. The stone was carried in barges down the Bidouze and Adour rivers.

== Sights ==
=== Civil Heritage ===
- Farms and houses from the 17th and 18th centuries,
- A farm from the 18th century in the lieu-dit Chabay,
- The well, wash-house, and fountain of Garay.

=== Religious Heritage ===
The church of l'Assomption-de-la-Bienheureuse-Vierge-Marie from the 13th century is listed as an historical monument. It has characteristics of both Romanesque and Gothic architecture. The church is located on the road, Saint-Jacques-de-Compostelle (Via Turonensis). A wellspring runs underneath the church, feeding a washing-place in the basement. An 18th-century Madonna statue called Notre-Dame-d'Arancou can be found in the church, as well as an hilarri (a disk-shaped funeral stele) from Labets-Biscay, and different furnishings registered in the inventory of the Minister of Culture (a tabernacle, font, and cross). The church also has a registered stained glass window.

== See also ==
- Communes of the Pyrénées-Atlantiques department
