= Came, Pyrénées-Atlantiques =

Came Akamarre
- Commune
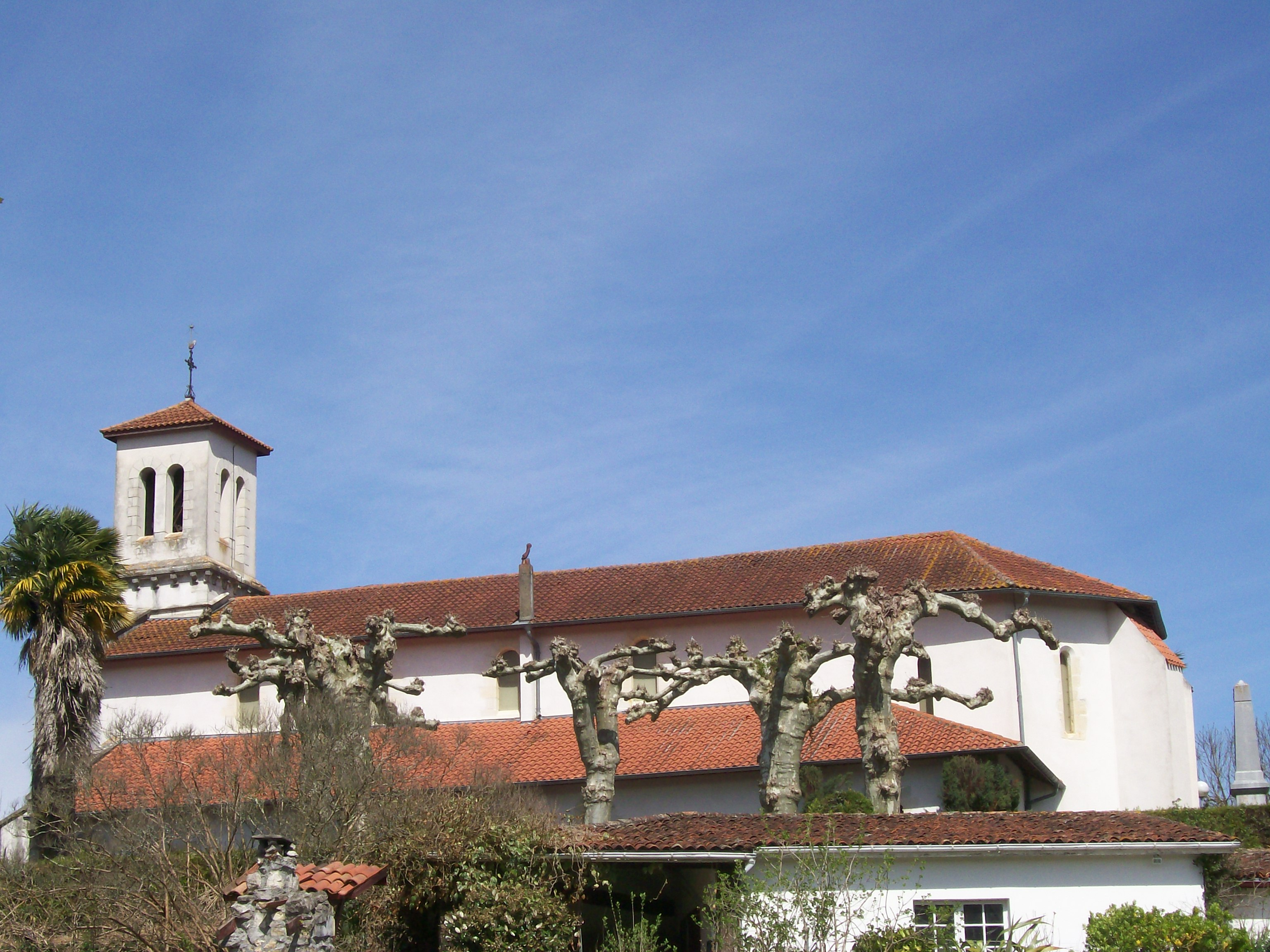
- The church of Saint-Martin

- Coat of arms
- Location of Came
- Location within France Location within Nouvelle-Aquitaine
- Coordinates: 43°28′27″N 1°06′33″W
- Country: France
- Region: Nouvelle-Aquitaine
- Department: Pyrénées-Atlantiques
- Arrondissement: Bayonne
- Canton: Pays de Bidache, Amikuze et Ostibarre
- Intercommunality: CA Pays Basque

Government
  - Mayor (2020–2026): Christine Serres-Cousine
- Area^{1}: 33.90 km^{2} (13.09 sq mi)
- Elevation: 30 m (98 ft)
- Highest elevation: 177 m (581 ft)
- Lowest elevation: 1 m (3.3 ft)
- Population (2023): 1,024
  - Density: 30.21/km^{2} (78.23/sq mi)
- Time zone: UTC+01:00 (CET)
  - Summer (DST): UTC+02:00 (CEST)
- INSEE/Postal code: 64161 /64520
- ^{1} French Land Register data, which excludes lakes, ponds, glaciers > 1 km^{2} (0.386 sq mi or 247 acres) and river estuaries.

Came (French pronunciation: [kam]; Basque: Akamarre; Occitan: Vengut) is a commune in the Pyrénées-Atlantiques department in south-western France.

It is located in the former province of Lower Navarre.

== See also ==
- Communes of the Pyrénées-Atlantiques department
