= Bergouey-Viellenave =

Bergouey-Viellenave Burgue-Erreiti
- Commune
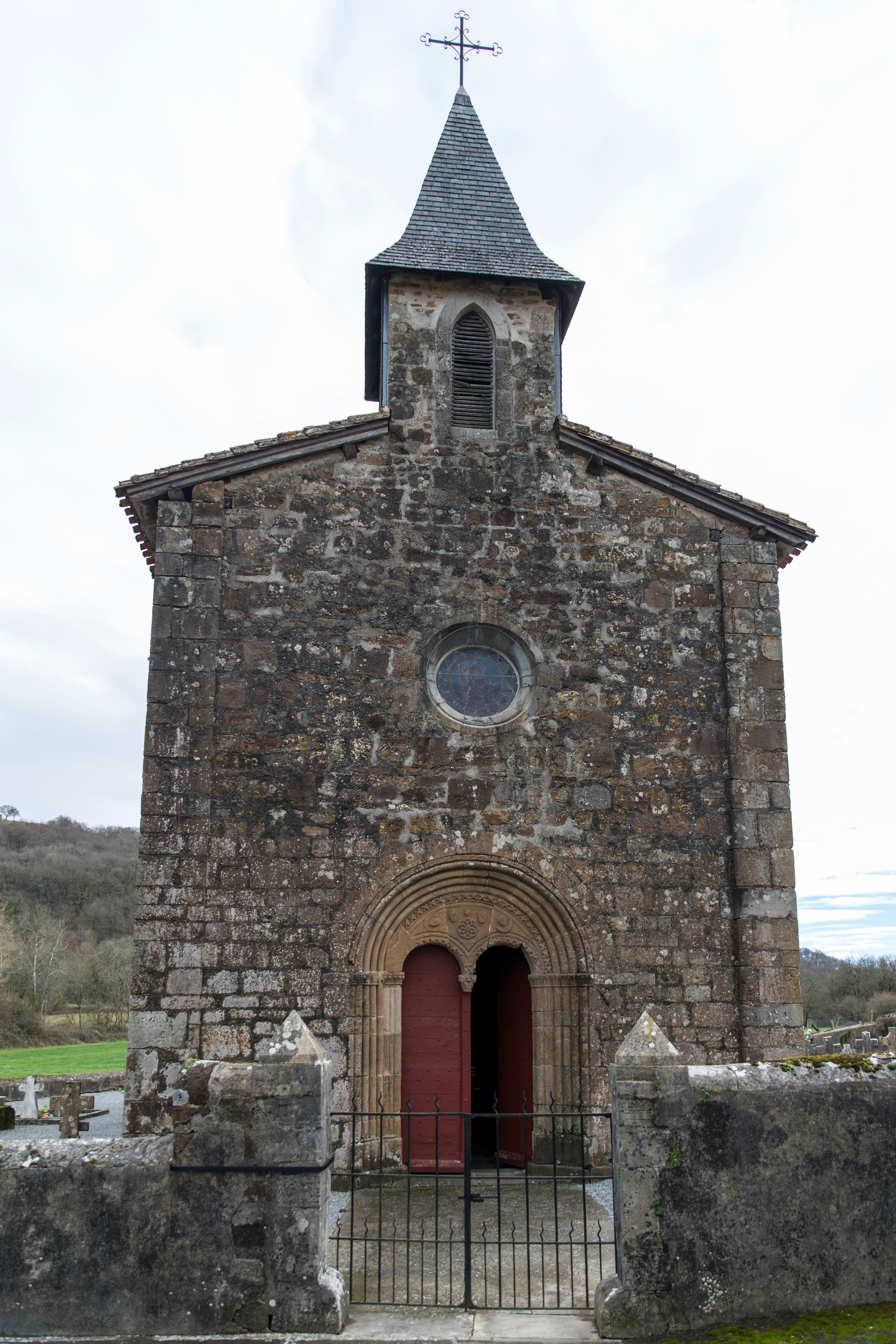
- Church of Viellenave

- Coat of arms
- Location of Bergouey-Viellenave
- Location within France Location within Nouvelle-Aquitaine
- Coordinates: 43°25′26″N 1°03′19″W
- Country: France
- Region: Nouvelle-Aquitaine
- Department: Pyrénées-Atlantiques
- Arrondissement: Bayonne
- Canton: Pays de Bidache, Amikuze et Ostibarre
- Intercommunality: CA Pays Basque

Government
  - Mayor (2020–2026): Félix Noblia
- Area^{1}: 11.37 km^{2} (4.39 sq mi)
- Elevation: 73 m (240 ft)
- Highest elevation: 166 m (545 ft)
- Lowest elevation: 14 m (46 ft)
- Population (2023): 123
  - Density: 10.8/km^{2} (28.0/sq mi)
- Time zone: UTC+01:00 (CET)
  - Summer (DST): UTC+02:00 (CEST)
- INSEE/Postal code: 64113 /64270
- ^{1} French Land Register data, which excludes lakes, ponds, glaciers > 1 km^{2} (0.386 sq mi or 247 acres) and river estuaries.

Bergouey-Viellenave (Basque: Burgue-Erreiti; Occitan: Bergouey-Ancian) is a commune of the Pyrénées-Atlantiques department in southwestern France. It was created in 1973 by the merger of three former communes: Bergouey, Arancou and Viellenave-sur-Bidouze. Arancou was re-established in November 1977.

It is located in the former province of Lower Navarre.

== See also ==
- Communes of the Pyrénées-Atlantiques department
