= Orègue =

Orègue Oragarre (Basque)
- Commune
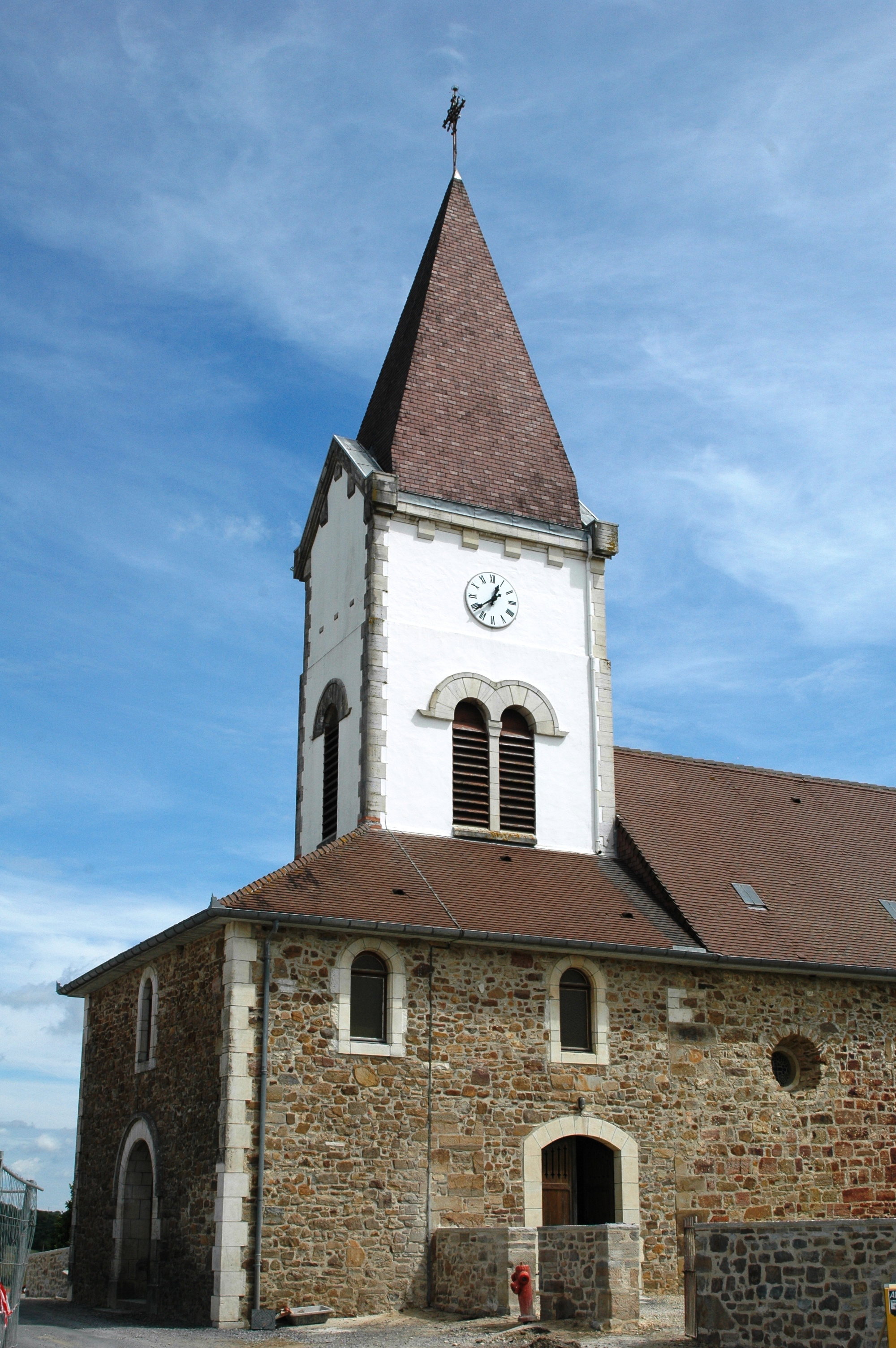
- The church of Orègue
- Location of Orègue
- Location within France Location within Nouvelle-Aquitaine
- Coordinates: 43°23′43″N 1°08′02″W
- Country: France
- Region: Nouvelle-Aquitaine
- Department: Pyrénées-Atlantiques
- Arrondissement: Bayonne
- Canton: Pays de Bidache, Amikuze et Ostibarre
- Intercommunality: CA Pays Basque

Government
  - Mayor (2020–2026): Pascal Dantiacq
- Area^{1}: 36.43 km^{2} (14.07 sq mi)
- Elevation: 66 m (217 ft)
- Highest elevation: 230 m (750 ft)
- Lowest elevation: 19 m (62 ft)
- Population (2023): 531
  - Density: 14.6/km^{2} (37.8/sq mi)
- Time zone: UTC+01:00 (CET)
  - Summer (DST): UTC+02:00 (CEST)
- INSEE/Postal code: 64425 /64120
- ^{1} French Land Register data, which excludes lakes, ponds, glaciers > 1 km^{2} (0.386 sq mi or 247 acres) and river estuaries.

Orègue (French pronunciation: [ɔʁɛɡ]; Basque: Oragarre; Occitan: Oregon) is a commune in the Pyrénées-Atlantiques department in south-western France. It is in the former province of Lower Navarre.

== See also ==
- Communes of the Pyrénées-Atlantiques department
