= Béguios =

Béguios Behauze
- Commune
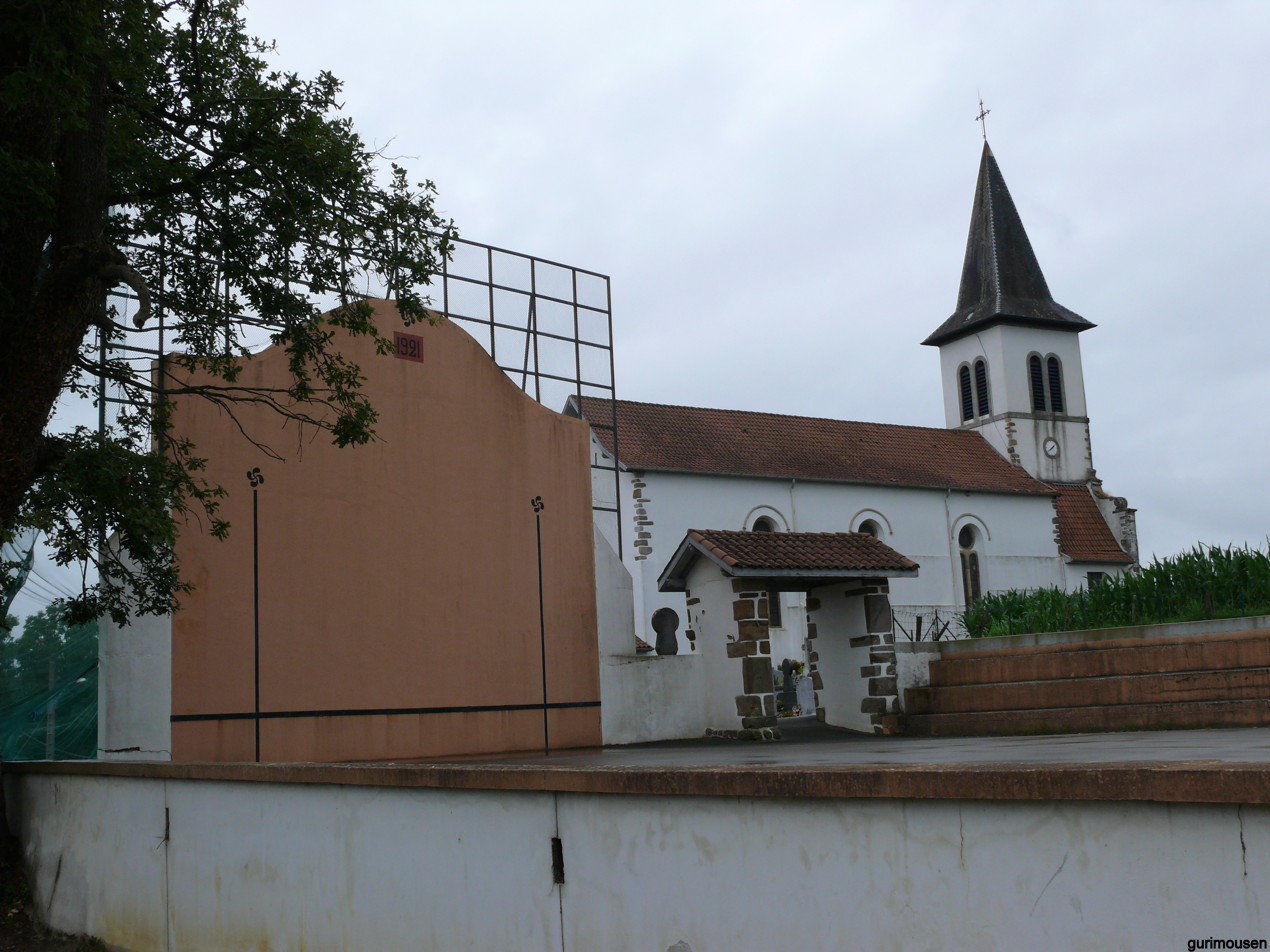
- Pelota court and church of Saint-Pierre

- Coat of arms
- Location of Béguios
- Location within France Location within Nouvelle-Aquitaine
- Coordinates: 43°21′37″N 1°05′07″W
- Country: France
- Region: Nouvelle-Aquitaine
- Department: Pyrénées-Atlantiques
- Arrondissement: Bayonne
- Canton: Pays de Bidache, Amikuze et Ostibarre
- Intercommunality: CA Pays Basque

Government
  - Mayor (2020–2026): Didier Irigoin
- Area^{1}: 11.26 km^{2} (4.35 sq mi)
- Elevation: 100 m (330 ft)
- Highest elevation: 295 m (968 ft)
- Lowest elevation: 40 m (130 ft)
- Population (2023): 259
  - Density: 23.0/km^{2} (59.6/sq mi)
- Time zone: UTC+01:00 (CET)
  - Summer (DST): UTC+02:00 (CEST)
- INSEE/Postal code: 64105 /64120
- ^{1} French Land Register data, which excludes lakes, ponds, glaciers > 1 km^{2} (0.386 sq mi or 247 acres) and river estuaries.

Béguios (Occitan: Beguins; Basque: Behauze) is a commune of the Pyrénées-Atlantiques department in southwestern France.

It is located in the former province of Lower Navarre.

== See also ==
- Communes of the Pyrénées-Atlantiques department
