= Masparraute =

Masparraute Martxueta
- Commune
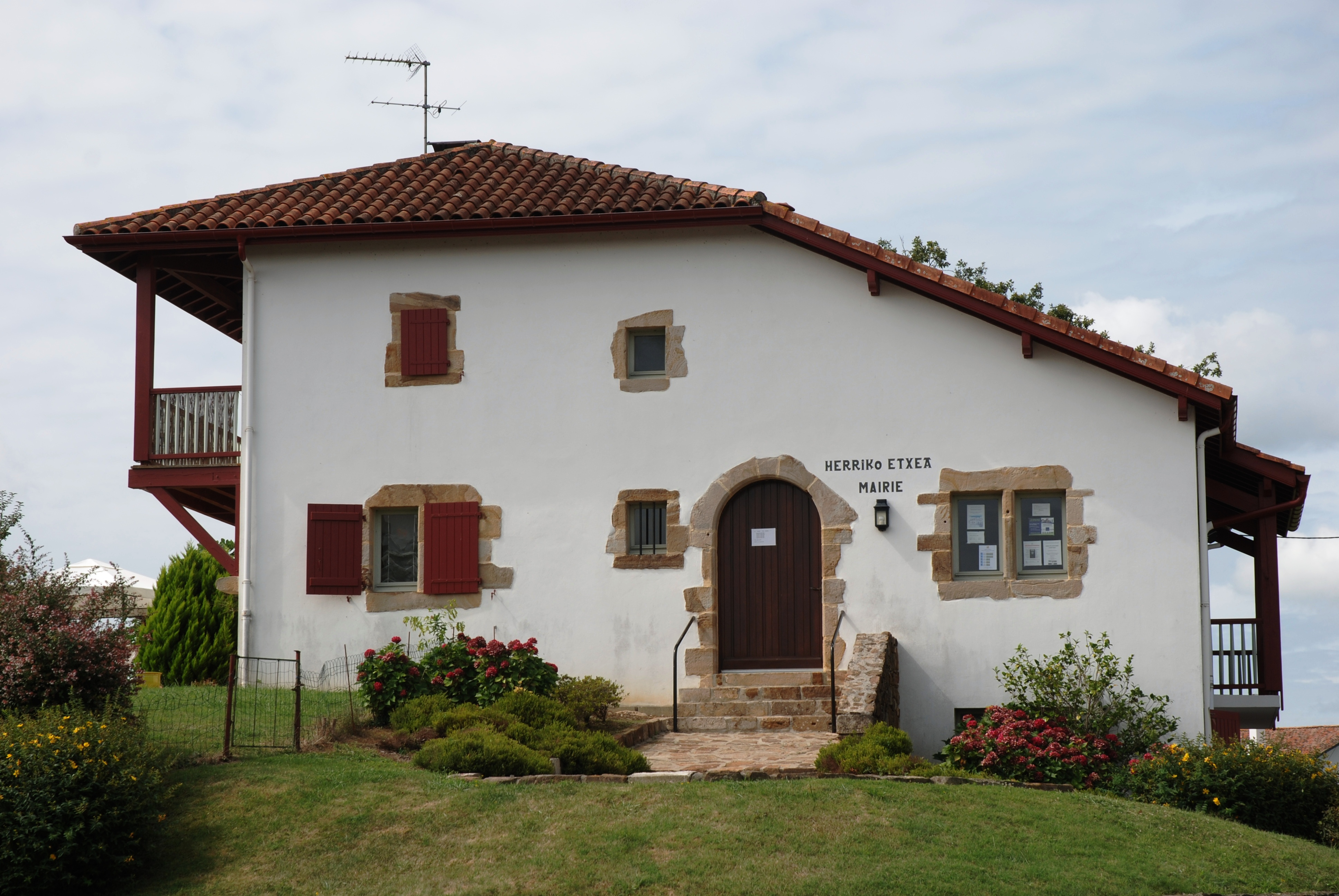
- The town hall of Masparraute
- Location of Masparraute
- Location within France Location within Nouvelle-Aquitaine
- Coordinates: 43°23′26″N 1°05′33″W
- Country: France
- Region: Nouvelle-Aquitaine
- Department: Pyrénées-Atlantiques
- Arrondissement: Bayonne
- Canton: Pays de Bidache, Amikuze et Ostibarre
- Intercommunality: CA Pays Basque

Government
  - Mayor (2020–2026): Joseph Paris
- Area^{1}: 8.16 km^{2} (3.15 sq mi)
- Elevation: 52 m (171 ft)
- Highest elevation: 123 m (404 ft)
- Lowest elevation: 26 m (85 ft)
- Population (2023): 264
  - Density: 32.4/km^{2} (83.8/sq mi)
- Time zone: UTC+01:00 (CET)
  - Summer (DST): UTC+02:00 (CEST)
- INSEE/Postal code: 64368 /64120
- ^{1} French Land Register data, which excludes lakes, ponds, glaciers > 1 km^{2} (0.386 sq mi or 247 acres) and river estuaries.

Masparraute (French pronunciation: [maspaʁot]; Occitan: Masparrauta; Basque: Martxueta) is a commune in the Pyrénées-Atlantiques department in south-western France.

It is located in the former province of Lower Navarre.

== See also ==
- Communes of the Pyrénées-Atlantiques department
