= Bernard Etxepare =

Basque-language writer and priest

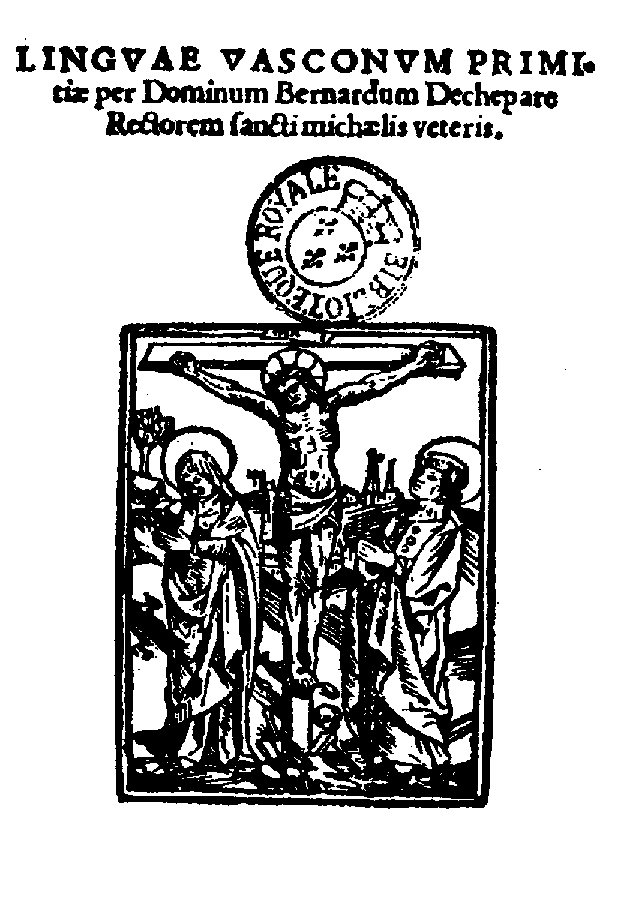
- The title page of Etxepare's book
- Born: Bernard D'echepare ca. 1470, Bussunarits-Sarrasquette, Navarre
- Died: unknown
- Occupation: Priest
- Writing career
- Notable work: Linguæ Vasconum Primitiæ

Bernard Etxepare (pronounced [berˈnart eˈtʃepaɾe]) was a Basque writer of the 16th century, most famous for a collection of poems titled Linguæ Vasconum Primitiæ ("First Fruits of the Basque Language") that he published in 1545, the first book to be published in the Basque language.

== Spellings of the name ==
His first name is also spelled Bernat or Beñat in Basque; he himself used Bernat. His surname is spelled Etxepare in modern Basque, but the variant Detxepare is also occasionally encountered in Basque, or Dechepare in Spanish, both based on the French spelling D'echepare. He himself used Dechepare.

== Life ==
Very little is known about his life. He was born c. 1470–1480 in the area of Saint-Jean-Pied-de-Port in Lower Navarre. His birthplace is the Etxeparia farmhouse in Bussunarits-Sarrasquette, and he spent the majority of his life in the valleys of Cize, working as rector in Saint-Michel at the church of Saint-Michel-le-Vieux and vicar in Saint-Jean-Pied-de-Port.

Etxepare lived through a period of war and upheaval from 1512 onward with the Castilian conquest of Upper Navarre. In one of his poems, Mossen Bernat echaparere cantuya, he confesses to having spent time in prison in Béarn, although the reasons for his detainment are not very clear. According to some, he was accused of having taken the side of Castile in its conflict with Navarre, not least of all due to religious reasons. Others, however, think that the reasons for his incarceration were moral rather than political. Either way, Etxepare maintained that he was innocent.

The date of his death is unknown.

== Linguæ Vasconum Primitiæ ==
In 1545 he published a book in Bordeaux, the Linguæ Vasconum Primitiæ, generally assumed to be the first book ever printed in Basque. It contains a collection of poems, some religious in nature, some love poems, one about his life, some extolling the virtues of the Basque language and others. It has been suggested by Oihenart in his L'art poétique basque from 1665 that some of his prestigious contemporary Basque writers such as Joan Etxegarai and Arnaut Logras who were famous for their pastorals might have been published too. However, if they were, any evidence has been lost.

It is written in the Lower Navarrese dialect of Basque, using a French-influenced orthography and the metre and style of writing suggest that Etxepare was a bertsolari, a type of Basque poet known for producing sung extemporised poetry.

The book contains:

- Foreword
- Doctrina Christiana "Christian Doctrine"
- Hamar manamenduyak "The Ten Commandments"
- Iudicio generala "General Judgement"
- Amorosen gaztiguya "The Disappointment of Lovers"
- Emazten favore "In Defense of Women"
- Ezconduyen coplac "The Couplet of the Married Couple"
- Amoros secretuguidena "The Secret Lover"
- Amorosen partizia "The Separation of Lovers"
- Amoros gelosia "The Jealous Lover"
- Potaren galdacia "Asking for a Kiss"
- Amorez errequericia "Requesting Love"
- Amorosen disputa "The Lovers Dispute"
- Ordu gayçarequi horrat zazquiçat
- Amore gogorren despira "Contempt for the Harsh Mother"
- Mossen Bernat echaparere cantuya "The Song of Mosén Bernat Etxepare"
- Contrapas
- Sautrela
- Extraict des regestes de Parlement

The following example is the Contrapas, which is a poem that broadly sets out Etxepare's motivation for producing this book and his hopes for the language. Etxepare explains that he is the first Basque writer to have his work published in print. He calls for the Basque language to "go out" and become more widely known, for the Basques to blaze new trails and make themselves known to the world.

Original text	Text in Standard Basque orthography	English
Contrapas.	Kontrapas.	Name of a dance and melody.
Heuscara ialgui adi cãpora.	Euskara jalgi hadi kanpora.	Basque, go outside.
Garacico herria Benedicadadila; Heuscarari emandio Beharduyen thornuya.	Garaziko herria benedika dadila Euskarari eman dio behar duen tornuia.	The town of Saint-Jean-Pied-de-Port be blessed for having given to Basque its befitting rank.
Heuscara ialgui adi plaçara.	Euskara jalgi hadi plazara.	Basque, go out into the square.
Berce gendec usteçuten Ecin scribaçayteyen Oray dute phorogatu Euganatu cirela.	Bertze jendek uste zuten ezin skriba zaiteien orain dute frogatu enganatu zirela.	Other deemed it impossible to write in Basque now they have proof that they were mistaken.
Heuscara ialgui adi mundura.	Euskara jalgi hadi mundura.	Basque, go out into the world.
Lengoagetan ohi inçan Estimatze gutitan Oray aldiz hic beharduc Ohori orotan.	Lengoajetan ohi hintzen estimatze gutxitan orain aldiz hik behar duk ohore orotan.	Amongst the tongues in little esteem (you were) now however, which you deserve honoured amongst all.
Heuscara habil mundu gucira.	Euskara habil mundu guztira.	Basque, walk the world at large.
Berceac oroc içan dira Bere goihen gradora Oray hura iganenda Berce ororen gaynera.	Bertzeak orok izan dira bere goihen gradora orain hura iganen da bertze ororen gainera.	The others all have ascended to their splendour now it (Basque) shall ascend above them all.
Heuscara	Euskara	Basque
Bascoac oroc preciatz? Heuscaraez iaquin harr? Oroc iccassiren dute Oray cerden heuscara.	Baskoak orok prezatzen Euskara ez jakin arren orok ikasiren dute orain zer den Euskara.	All praise the Basques though not knowing the Basque language now they shall learn what Basque is like.
Heuscara	Euskara	Basque
Oray dano egon bahiz Imprimitu bagueric Hiengoitic ebiliren Mundu gucietaric.	Oraindano egon bahaiz inprimatu bagerik hi engoitik ibiliren mundu guztietarik.	If you have until now were without printing you now shall travel throughout the world.
Heuscara	Euskara	Basque
Eceyn erelengoageric Ez francesa ez berceric Oray eztaerideyten Heuscararen pareric.	Ezein ere lengoajerik ez frantzesa ez bertzerik orain ez da erideiten Euskararen parerik.	There is no other language neither French nor another that now compares to Basque.
Heuscara ialgui adi dançara.	Euskara jalgi hadi dantzara.	Basque, go to the dance.

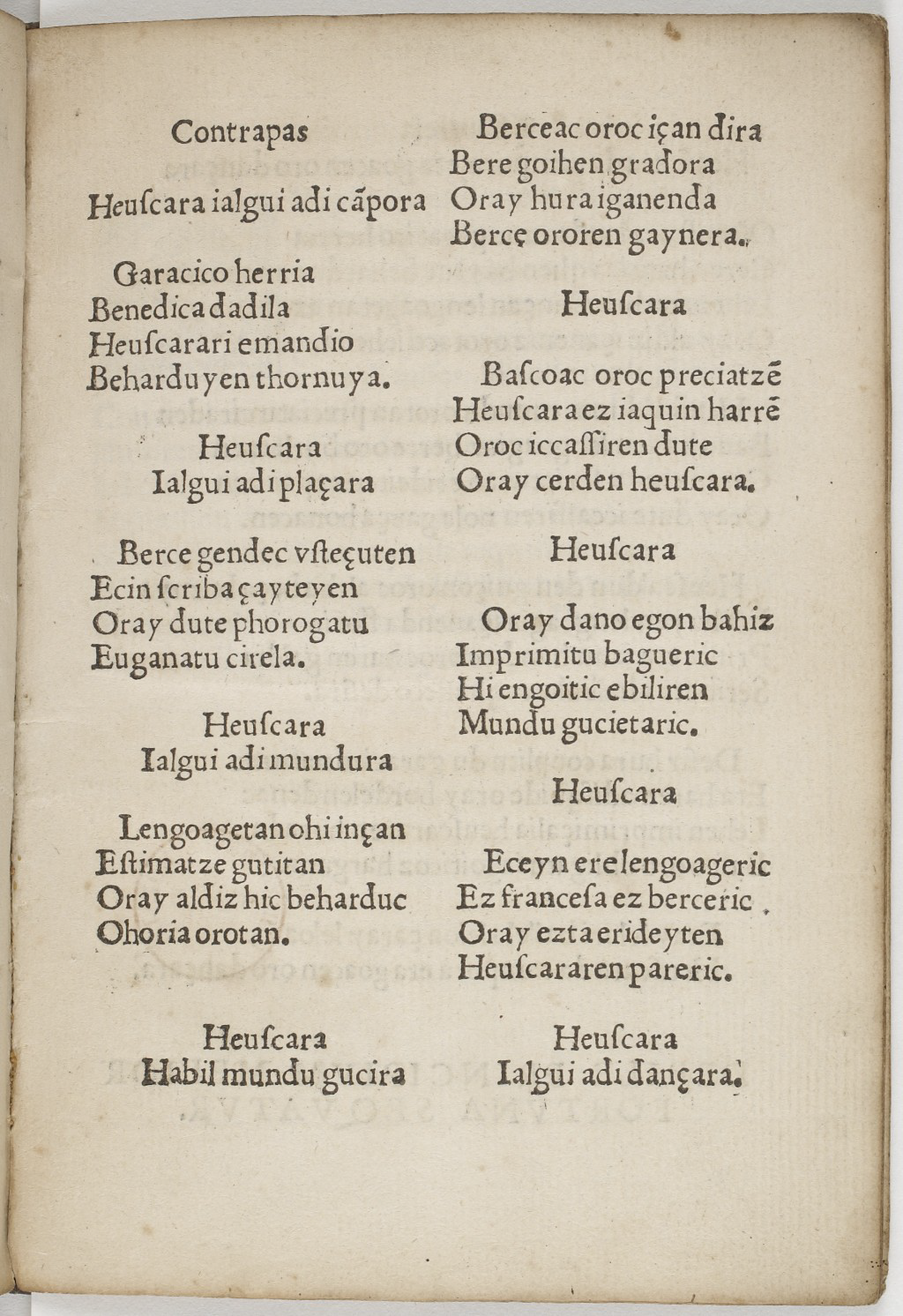
Contrapas. A photograph of the only copy of the original text, (kept at the National Library of France in Paris.

Note that the above rendition into Standard Basque contains several words which would be spelled like that but are rarely used. Instead of lengoaje "language" the indigenous terms mintzaira or hizkuntza would be most widely used today for example.

The only surviving original copy of the book is kept at the National Library of France in Paris. Irrespective of its literary value, his book has enjoyed enduring fame amongst Basques. Especially the last two pieces of his book, or excerpts thereof, are frequently quoted or used otherwise in the Basque scene. During the 1960s for example the Basque musician Xabier Lete produced a musical score to accompany the Kontrapas. More recently, a newly developed speech recognition software tool has been named Sautrela after the final poem in Etxepare's book and a Basque literature series in Basque Television is also named Sautrela.
