= Aincille =

Aincille Aintzilla
- Commune
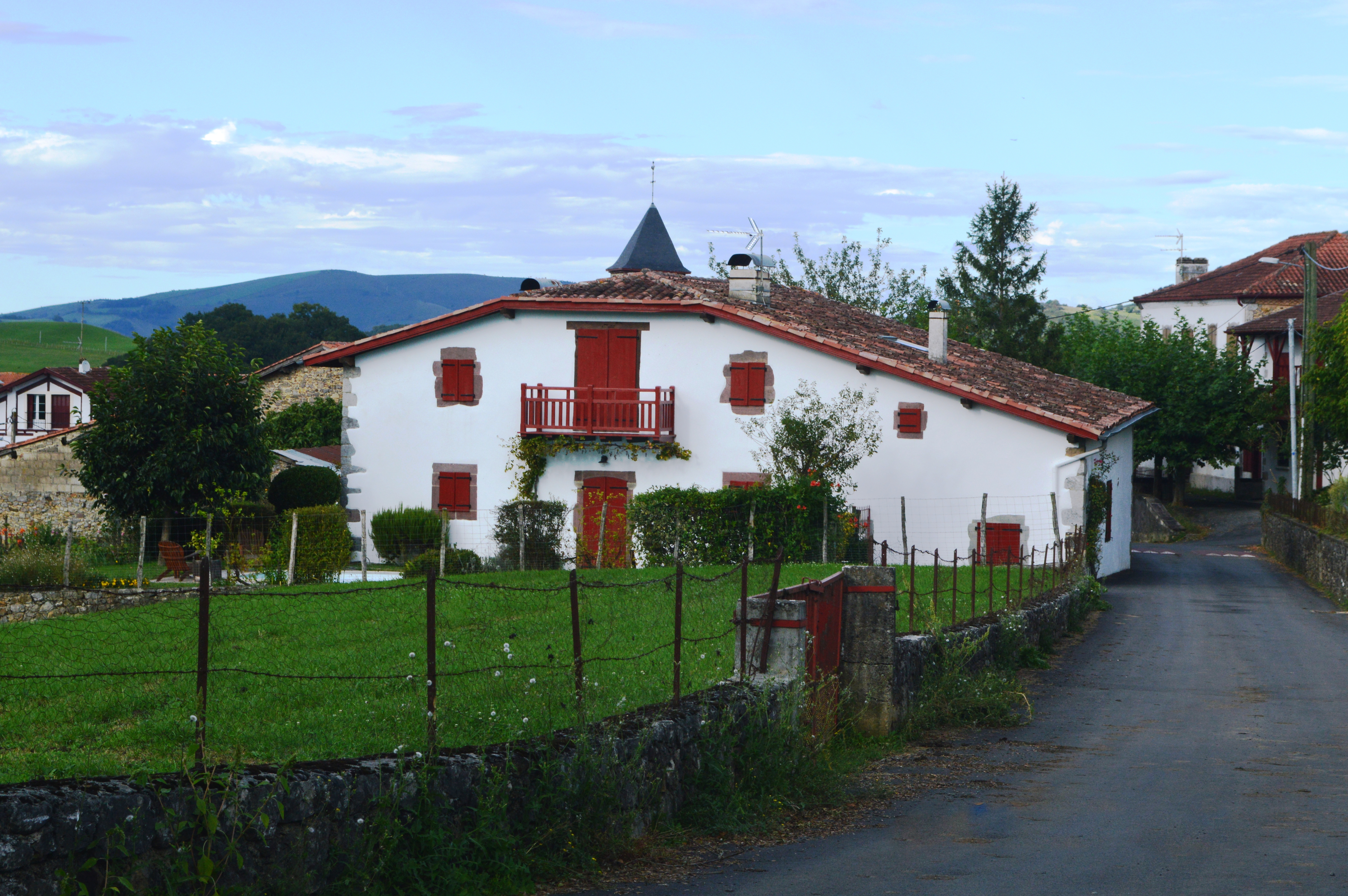
- A House in Aincille

- Coat of arms
- Location of Aincille
- Location within France Location within Nouvelle-Aquitaine
- Coordinates: 43°08′44″N 1°11′38″W
- Country: France
- Region: Nouvelle-Aquitaine
- Department: Pyrénées-Atlantiques
- Arrondissement: Bayonne
- Canton: Montagne Basque
- Intercommunality: Pays Basque

Government
  - Mayor (2020–2026): Gilbert Oçafrain
- Area^{1}: 6.26 km^{2} (2.42 sq mi)
- Elevation: 240 m (790 ft)
- Highest elevation: 755 m (2,477 ft)
- Lowest elevation: 198 m (650 ft)
- Population (2023): 117
  - Density: 18.7/km^{2} (48.4/sq mi)
- Time zone: UTC+01:00 (CET)
  - Summer (DST): UTC+02:00 (CEST)
- INSEE/Postal code: 64011 /64220
- ^{1} French Land Register data, which excludes lakes, ponds, glaciers > 1 km^{2} (0.386 sq mi or 247 acres) and river estuaries.

Aincille (French pronunciation: [ɛ̃sil]; Basque: Aintzilla; Occitan: Esbelh) is a commune in the Pyrénées-Atlantiques department in the Nouvelle-Aquitaine region in southwestern France.

== Geography ==
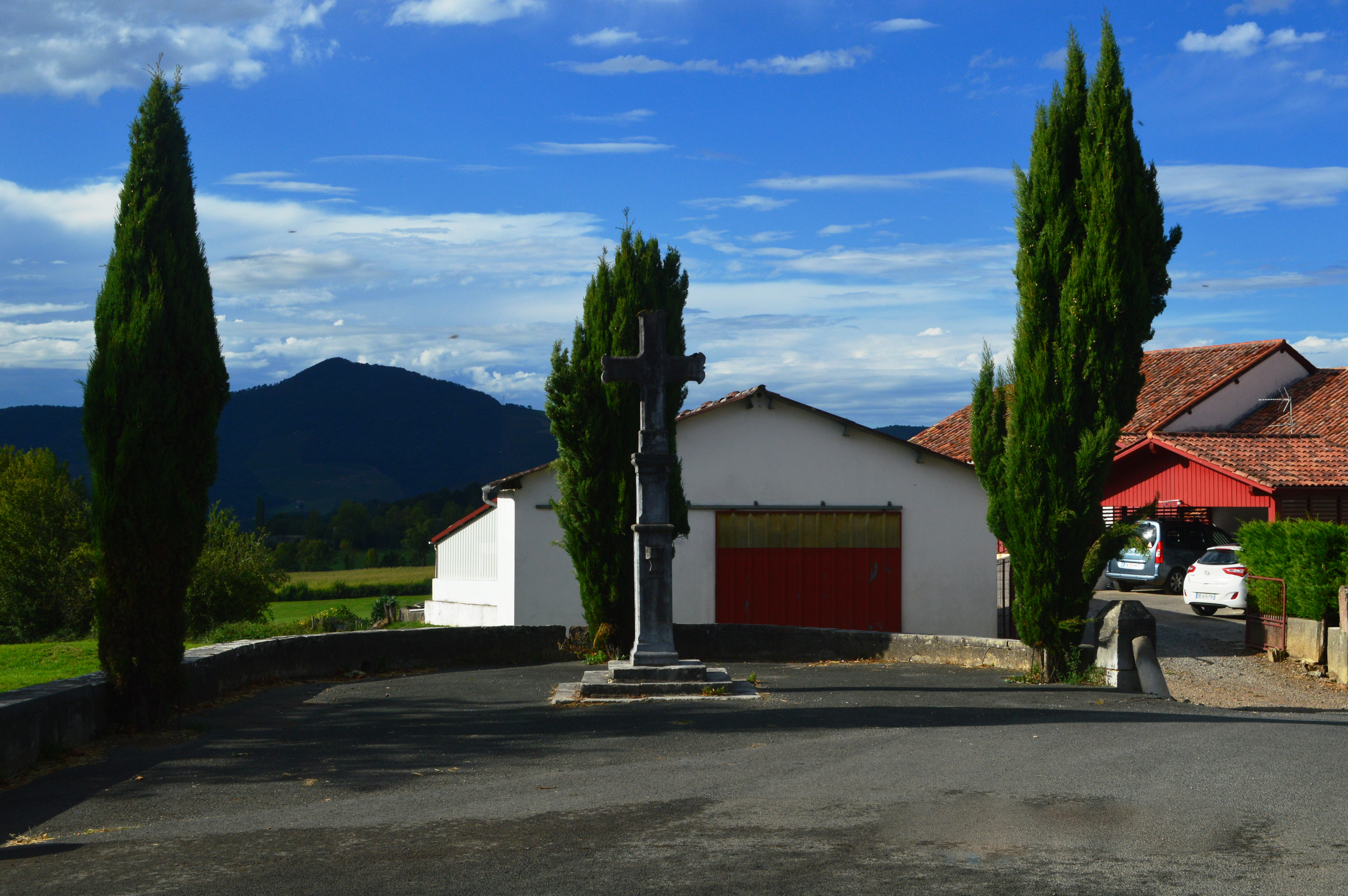
A Wayside Cross in Aincille

=== Location ===
The town is part of Cize Country in the former Basque province of Lower Navarre.

It is located some 50 km south-east of Bayonne and 5 km southeast of Saint-Jean-Pied-de-Port.

=== Access ===
The commune can be accessed by the D401 road from Saint-Jean-Pied-de-Port in the northwest to the village. From the village the D118 road goes north to join the D18 highway.

=== Hydrography ===
Located in the drainage basin of the Adour, the northeastern border of the commune is marked by the Laurhibar river, which flows north to join the Nive north of Saint-Jean-Pied-de-Port. A stream rises near the village and flows to the Laurhibar in the north-east. The Urtchipea rises in the south of the commune and flows northwest gathering many tributaries and joins the Nive de Beherobie at Saint-Michel. The Sassitako erreka rises southwest of the village and flows northwest joining the Laurhibar east of Saint-Jean-Pied-de-Port.

=== Localities and hamlets ===
- Ahadoa
- Aïntzilsarria
- Bassaburua
- Bentaberria
- Berho
- Chiramberroa
- Esconda
- Etcheverrigaraya
- Gamaberria
- Goyhenetchéa
- Handiague
- Harchilo
- Jaureguia
- Oilloquy
- Pagola
- Sahaby
- Sotalda

== Toponymy ==
The commune name in basque is Aintzila meaning "hill of mud", Aintzila or Aintzil-Harrieta.

Jean-Baptiste Orpustan wrote the name of the commune in the form Aïncille. He also indicated that in Basque the inhabitants are referred to as Aintzildar.

The following table details the origins of the commune name.

Name	Spelling	Date	Source	Page	Origin	Description
Aincille	Aincibiu	1264	Mérimée			Village
	Aincibiu	1309	Orpustan			
	Ancivil	1291	Orpustan			
	Ancivil	1292	Mérimée			
	Ancil	1304	Mérimée			
	Ancil	1344	Orpustan			
	Ançill	1307	Mérimée			
	Ançill	1307	Orpustan			
	Ancibiu	1350	Mérimée			
	Ancibiu	1350	Orpustan			
	Aincile	18th century	Raymond	4	Intendance	
	Ancille	1801	Cassini		Bulletin des lois	

Sources:

- Mérimée: Presentation of the Commune of Aincille on the Ministry of Culture website
- Orpustan: Jean-Baptiste Orpustan, New Basque Toponymy
- Raymond: Topographic Dictionary of the Department of Basses-Pyrenees, 1863, on the page numbers indicated in the table. (in French)
- Cassini: Des villages de Cassini aux communes d'aujourd'hui: Commune data sheet Aincille, EHESS (in French).

Origins:

- Intendance: Intendance of Pau

== History ==
Part of Aincille territory next to the communes of Ahaxe-Alciette-Bascassan, Bustince-Iriberry, Çaro, Lecumberry, Mendive, Saint-Jean-le-Vieux, and Saint-Michel, was taken on 11 June 1842 to form of the commune of Estérençuby.

=== Heraldry ===
Arms of Aincille	Blazon: Quarterly, first Azure a bridge of Or masoned in sable debruised over a wave of argent in base, in chief 3 stars the same arranged in fesse; second of Or with an eagle displayed in sable; three vert a cow of Or collared and belled in azure posed in base surmounted by a sheep of argent horned in Or; fourth azure with a church in Or in profile roofed the same extended at dexter with a porch abased and surmounted at dexter by a belltower and steeple the same supporting a cross in sable, windows and doors the same..

== Administration ==
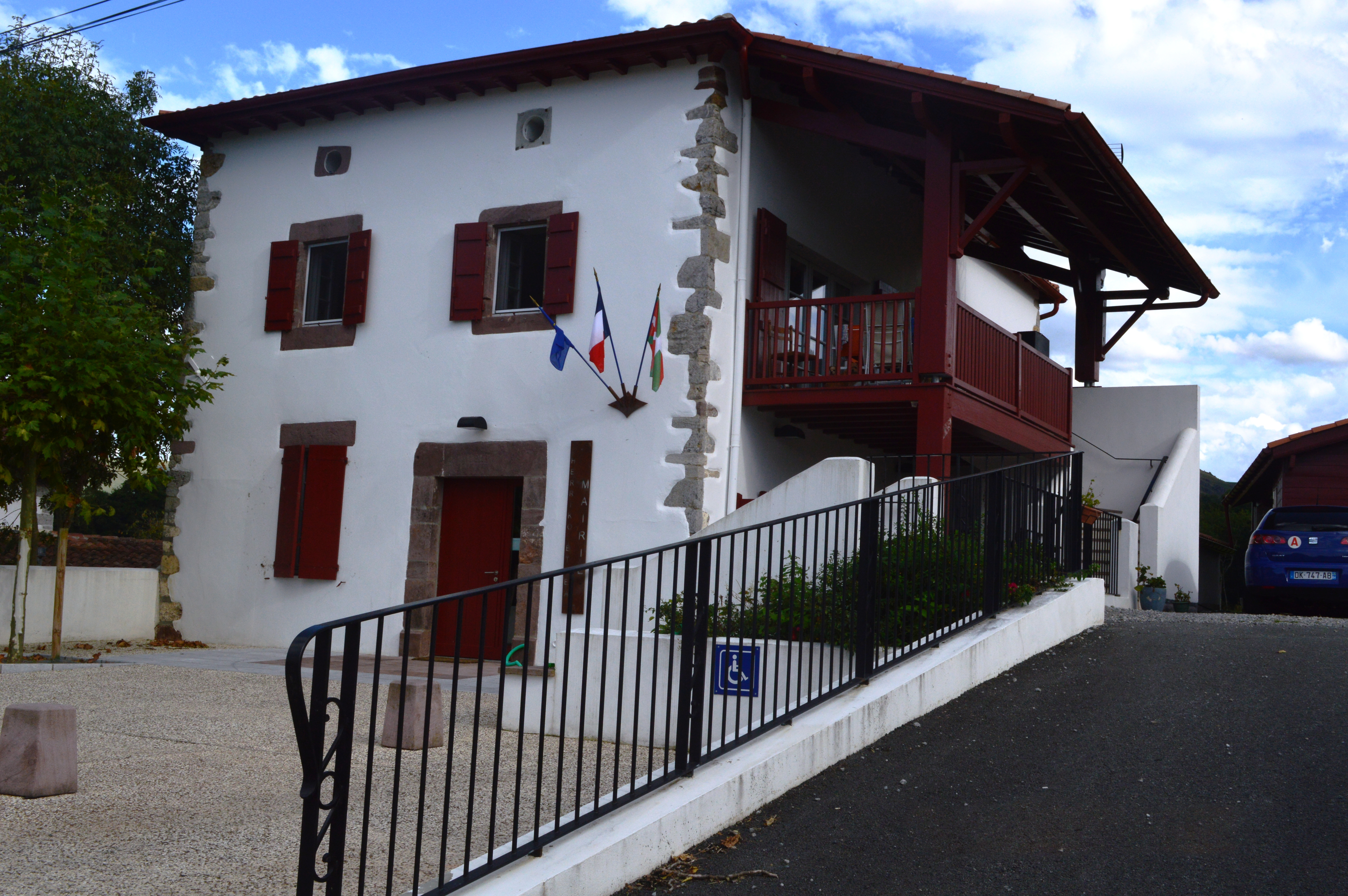
The Town Hall

List of Successive Mayors of Aincille

From	To	Name
1995	2008	Jean Françaistéguy
2008	2026	Gilbert Oçafrain

=== Inter-communality ===
The commune belongs to six intercommunal structures:

- the Communauté d'agglomération du Pays Basque
- the AEP association of Ainhice
- the energy association for Pyrenees-Atlantiques
- the intercommunal association for the development and management of the slaughterhouse at Saint-Jean-Pied-de-Port
- the joint association for the watershed of the Nive
- the association to support Basque culture.

== Population ==
Historical population
Year	Pop.	±% p.a.
1968	123	—
1975	136	+1.45%
1982	113	−2.61%
1990	110	−0.34%
1999	103	−0.73%
2007	124	+2.35%
2012	129	+0.79%
2017	112	−2.79%
2023	117	+0.73%
Source: INSEE

The inhabitants of the commune are known as Aintzildars.

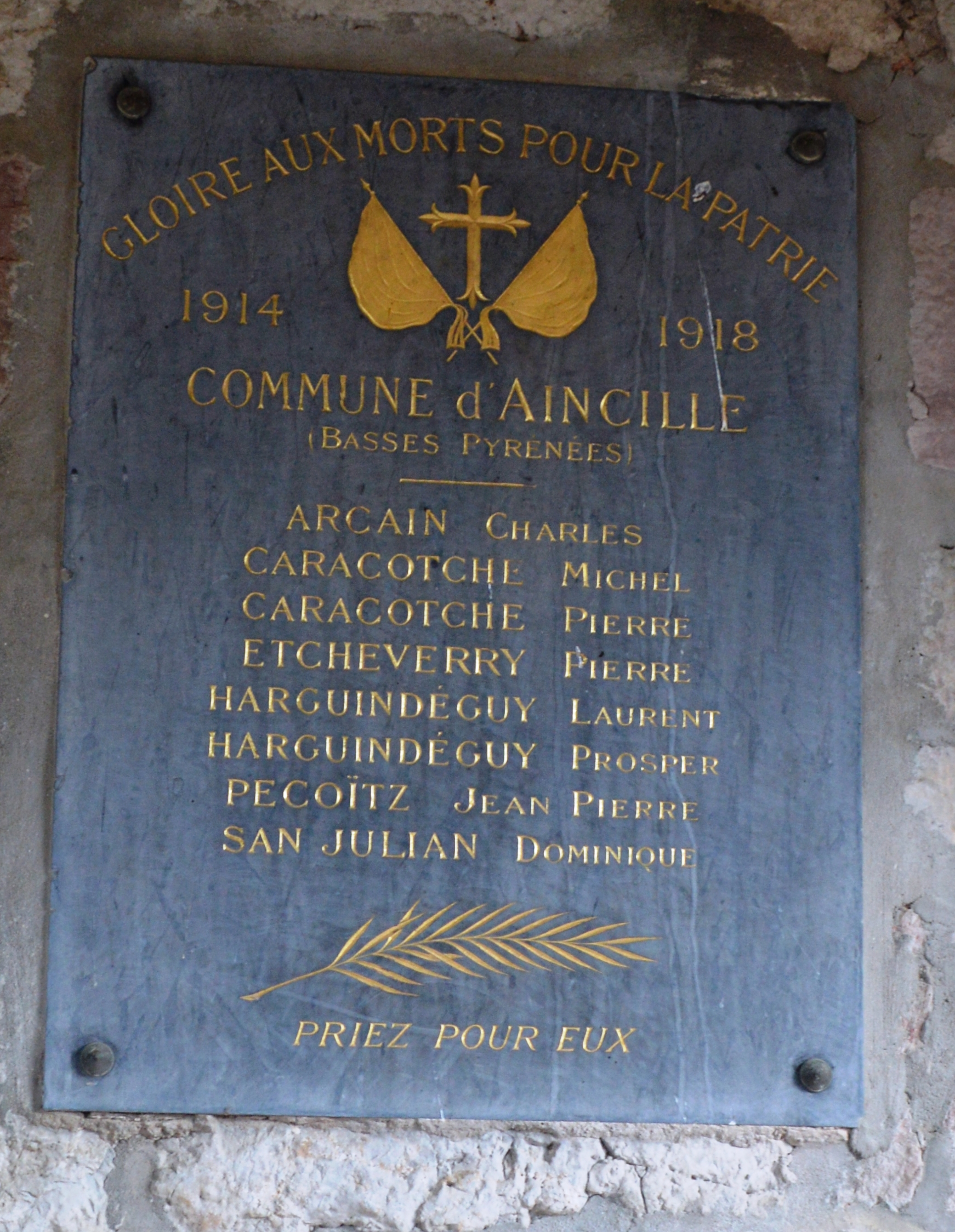
Aincille War Memorial

== Economy ==
The town is part of the production area of Irouléguy AOC and the Appellation d'origine contrôlée (AOC) zone of Ossau-iraty.

Economic activity is mainly agricultural.

Aincille had long received saline (saline of Ugarré) since the 17th century and had the distinction of being a corporation with ownership of twenty-nine old houses of the town and was reunited with the royal domain in 1683.

== Culture and heritage ==
=== Languages ===
According to the Map of the Seven Basque Provinces published in 1863 by Prince Louis-Lucien Bonaparte, the dialect of Basque spoken in Aincille is Eastern Low Navarrese.

=== Civil heritage ===
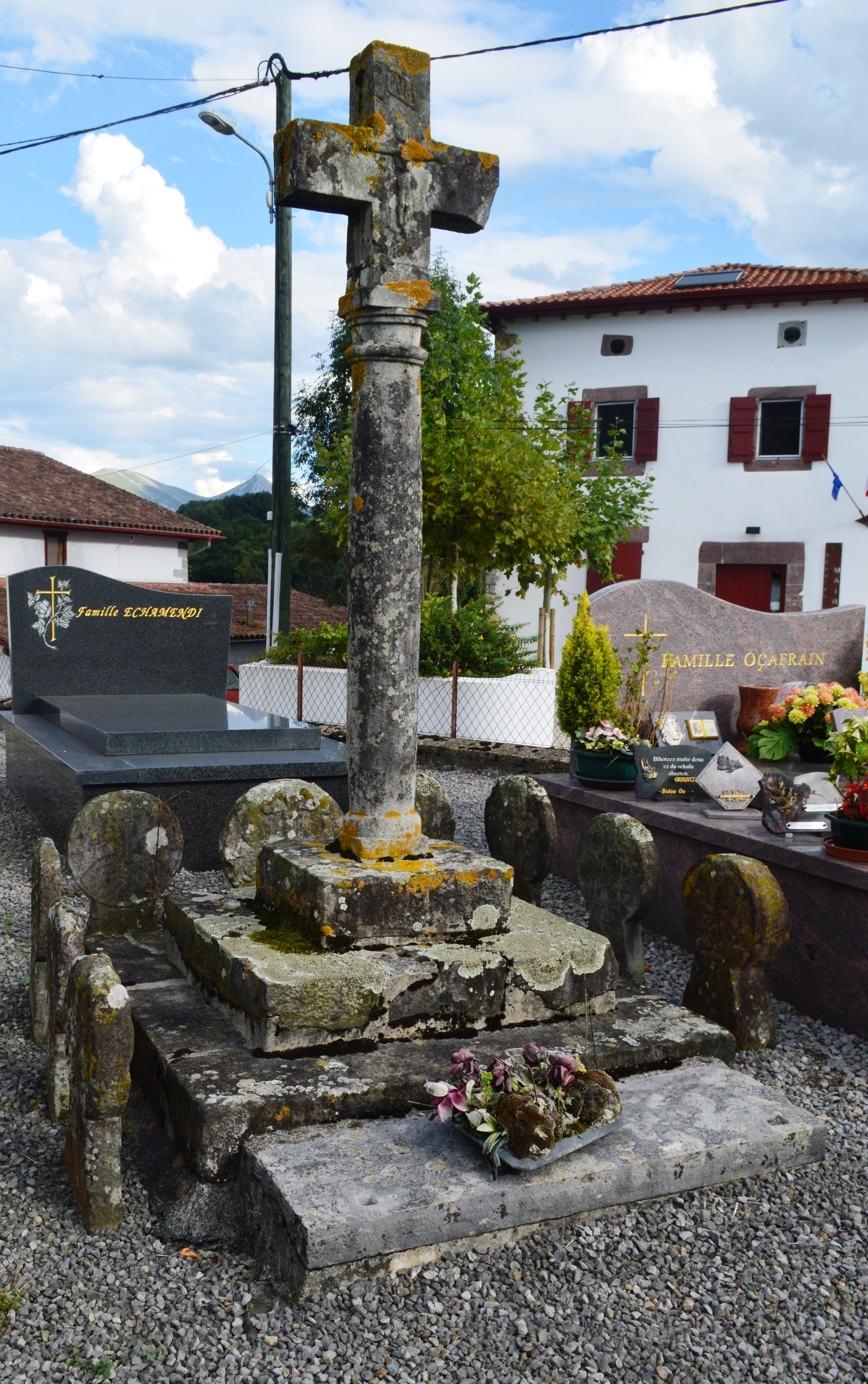
Aincille Cemetery Cross

The commune has several sites that are registered as historical monuments:

- Houses and Farms (18th-19th century)
- The Idiondoa Farmhouse (1617)
- The Ahadoberria Farmhouse (1768)

=== Religious Heritage ===
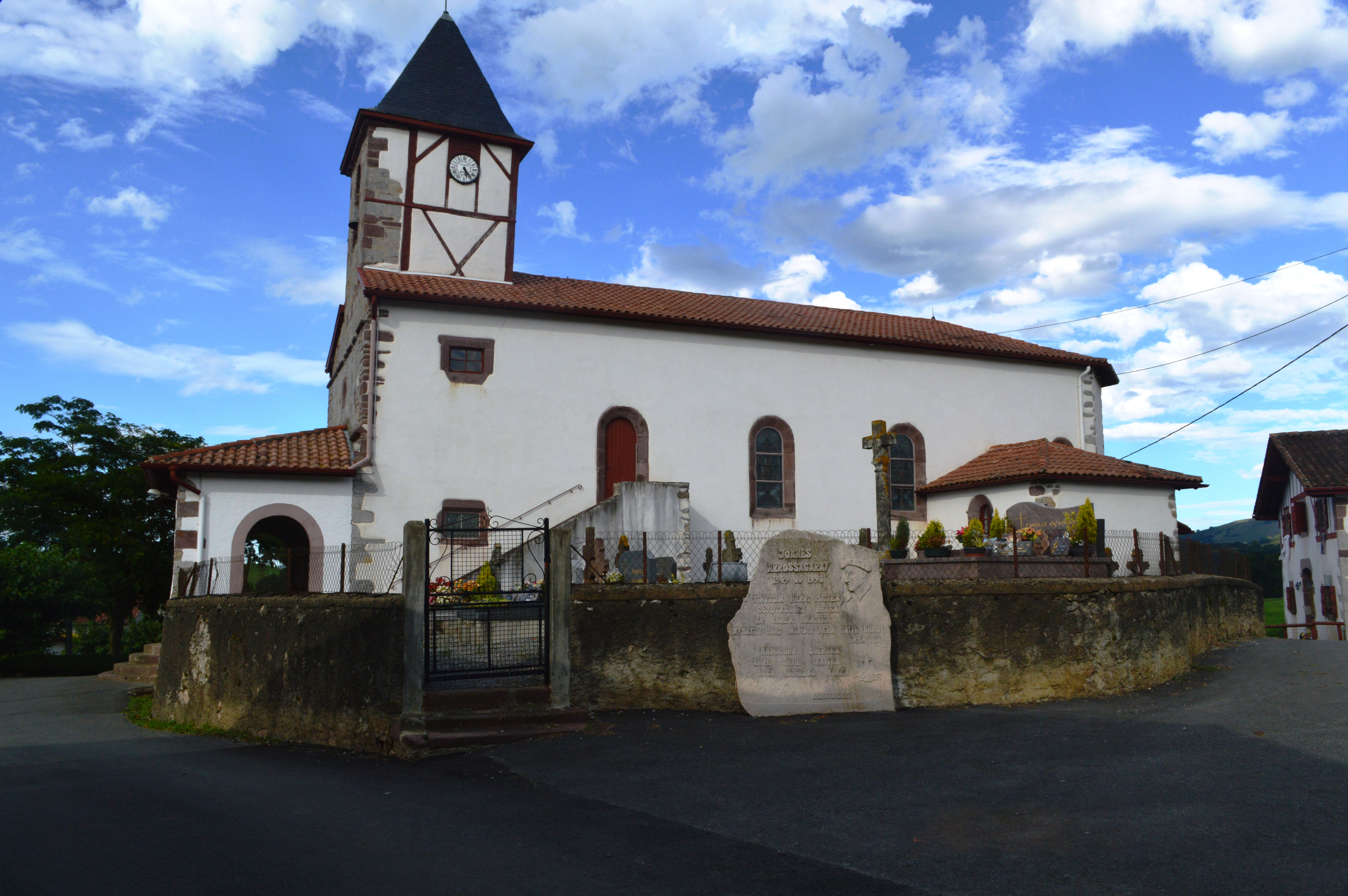
Church of the Assumption of the Blessed Virgin Mary and Saint John the Baptist

The commune has several religious sites that are registered as historical monuments:

- The Croix de Carrefour (Crossroads Cross) Wayside Cross
- A Cemetery Cross (17th century)
- The Parish Church of the Assumption of the Blessed Virgin Mary and Saint John the Baptist (Middle Ages) The church contains two items that are registered as historical objects:
  - A Processional Cross (18th century)
  - A Statue: Virgin and child (13th century)

Church Picture Gallery

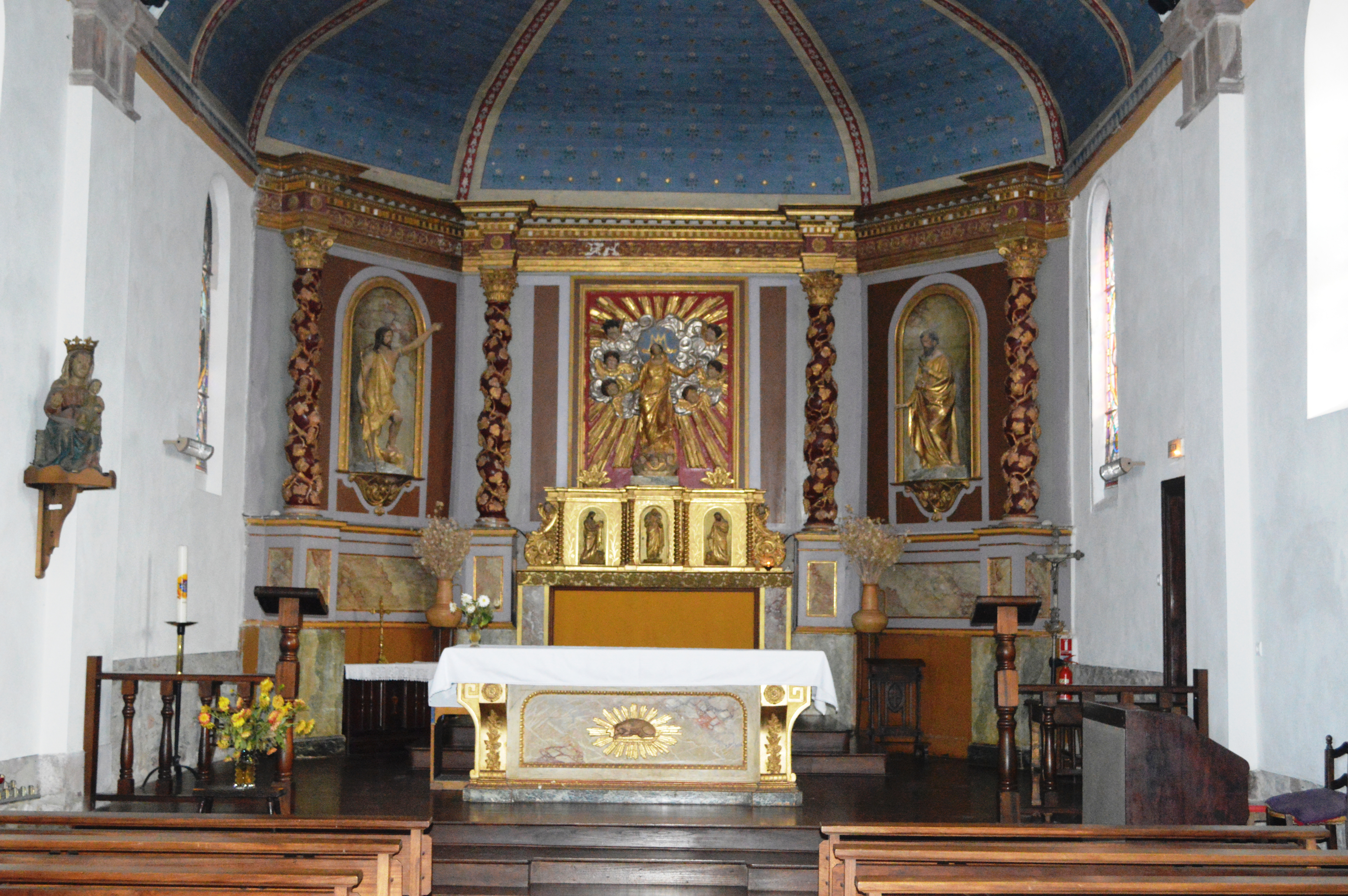
Aincille The Main Altar

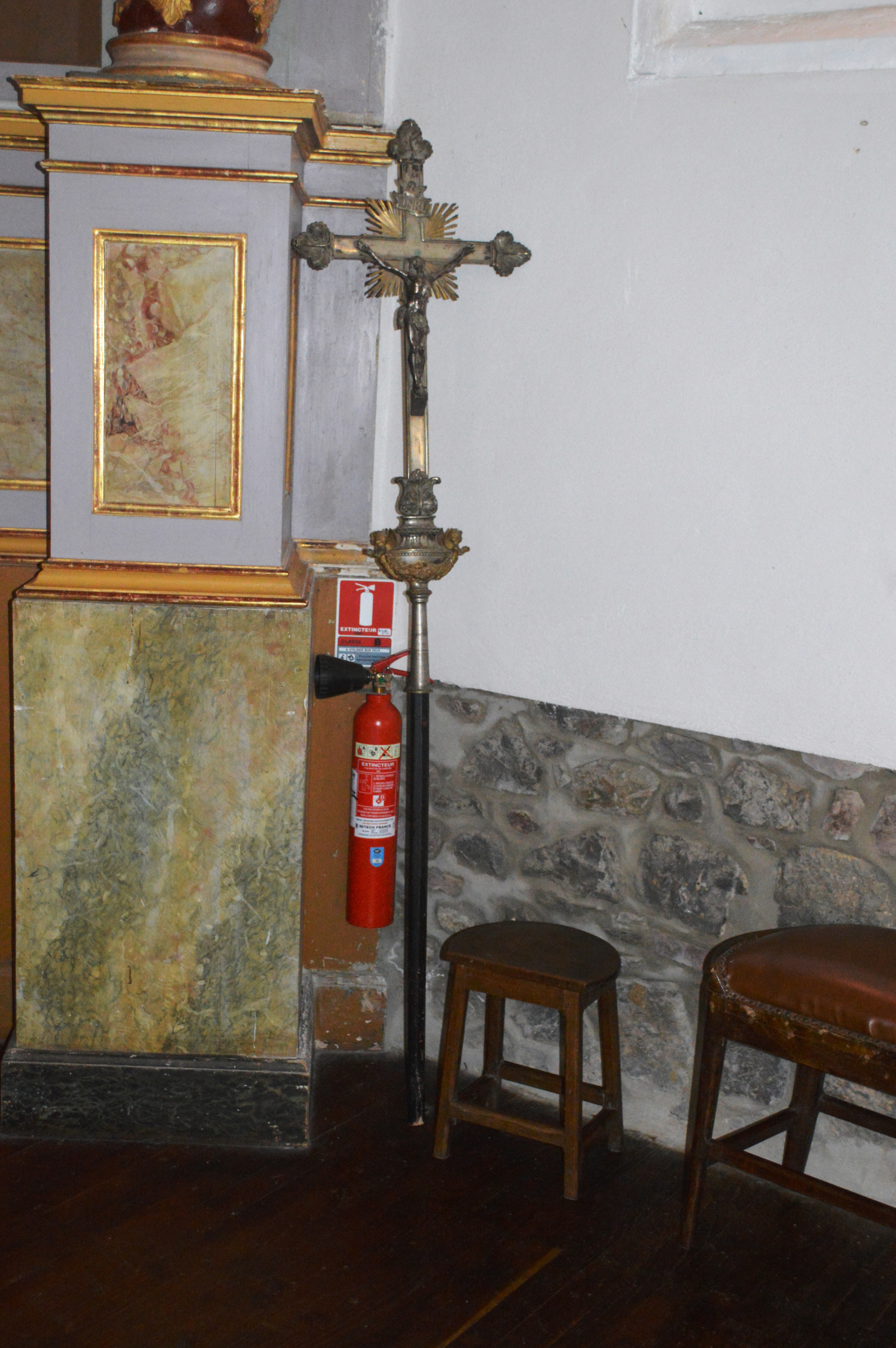
The Processional Cross

Stained Glass

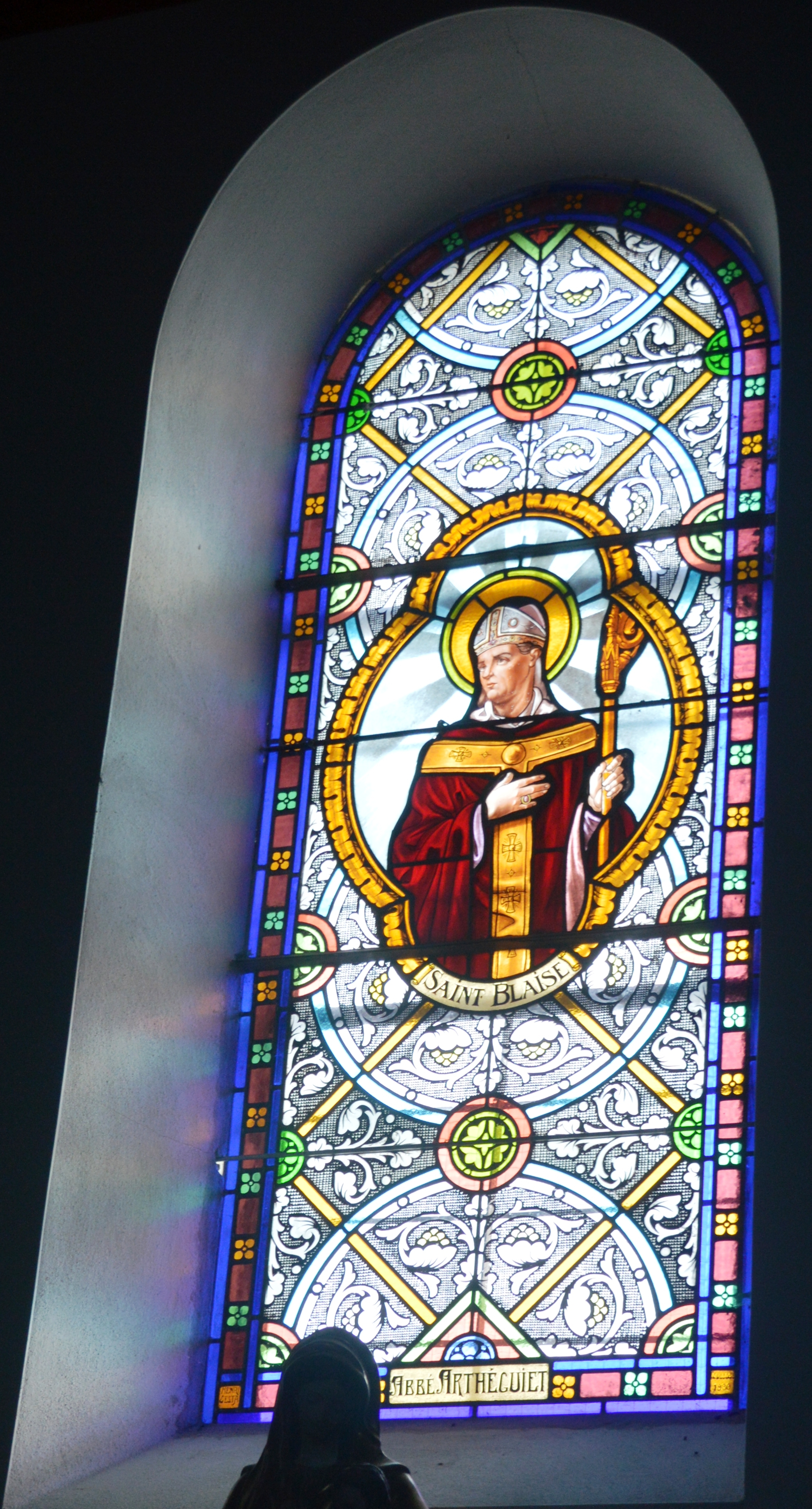
Saint Basile

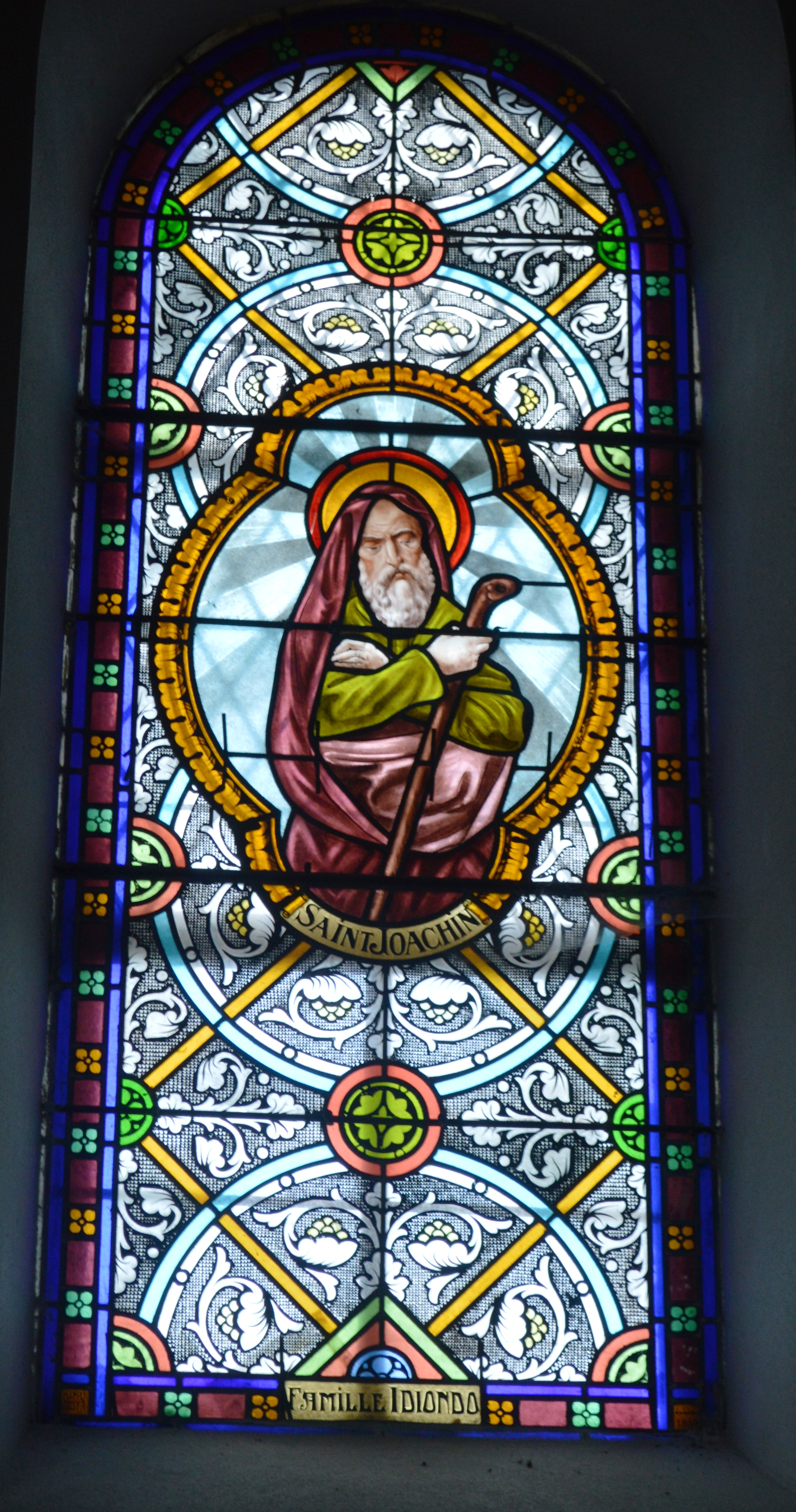
Saint Joachin

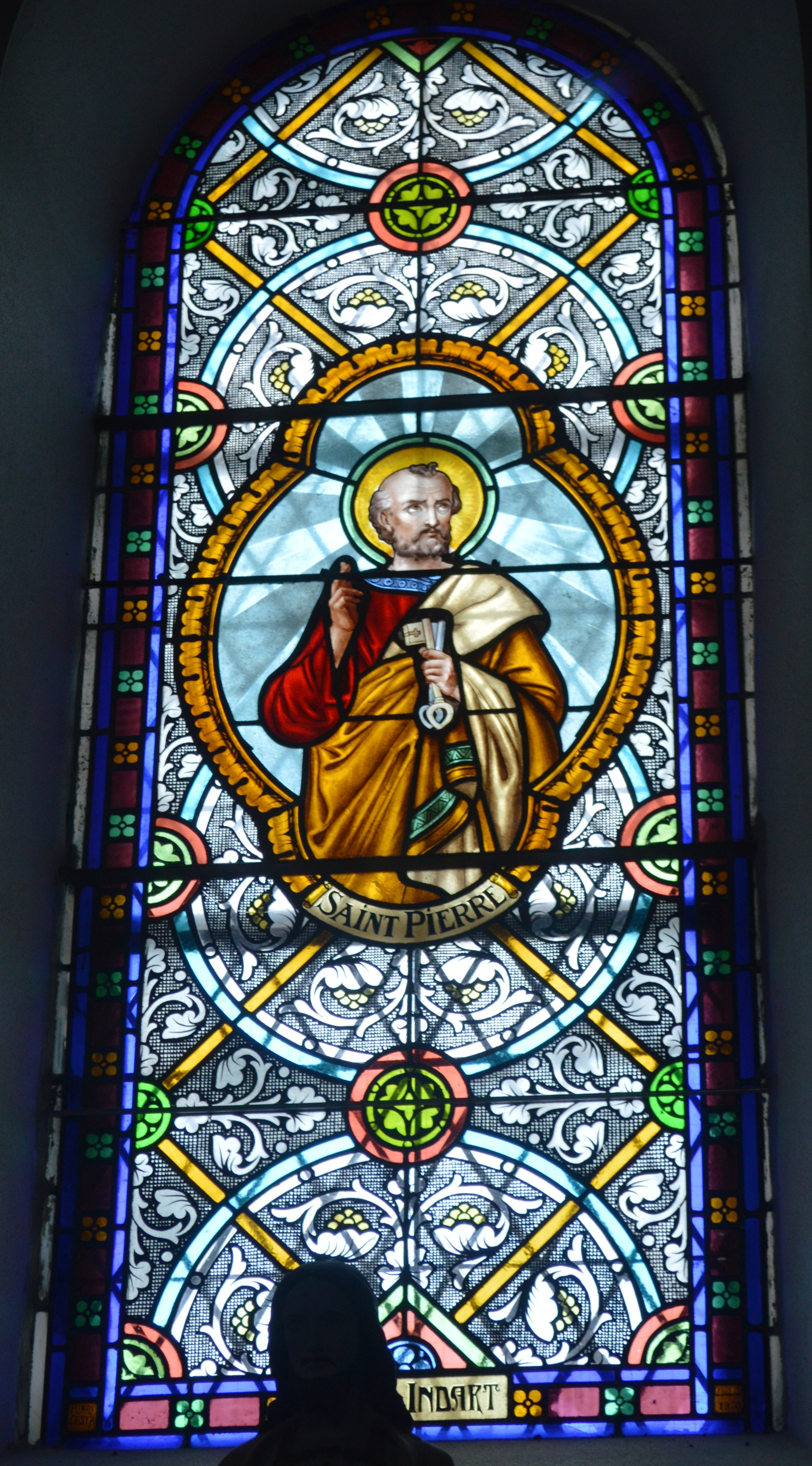
Saint Pierre

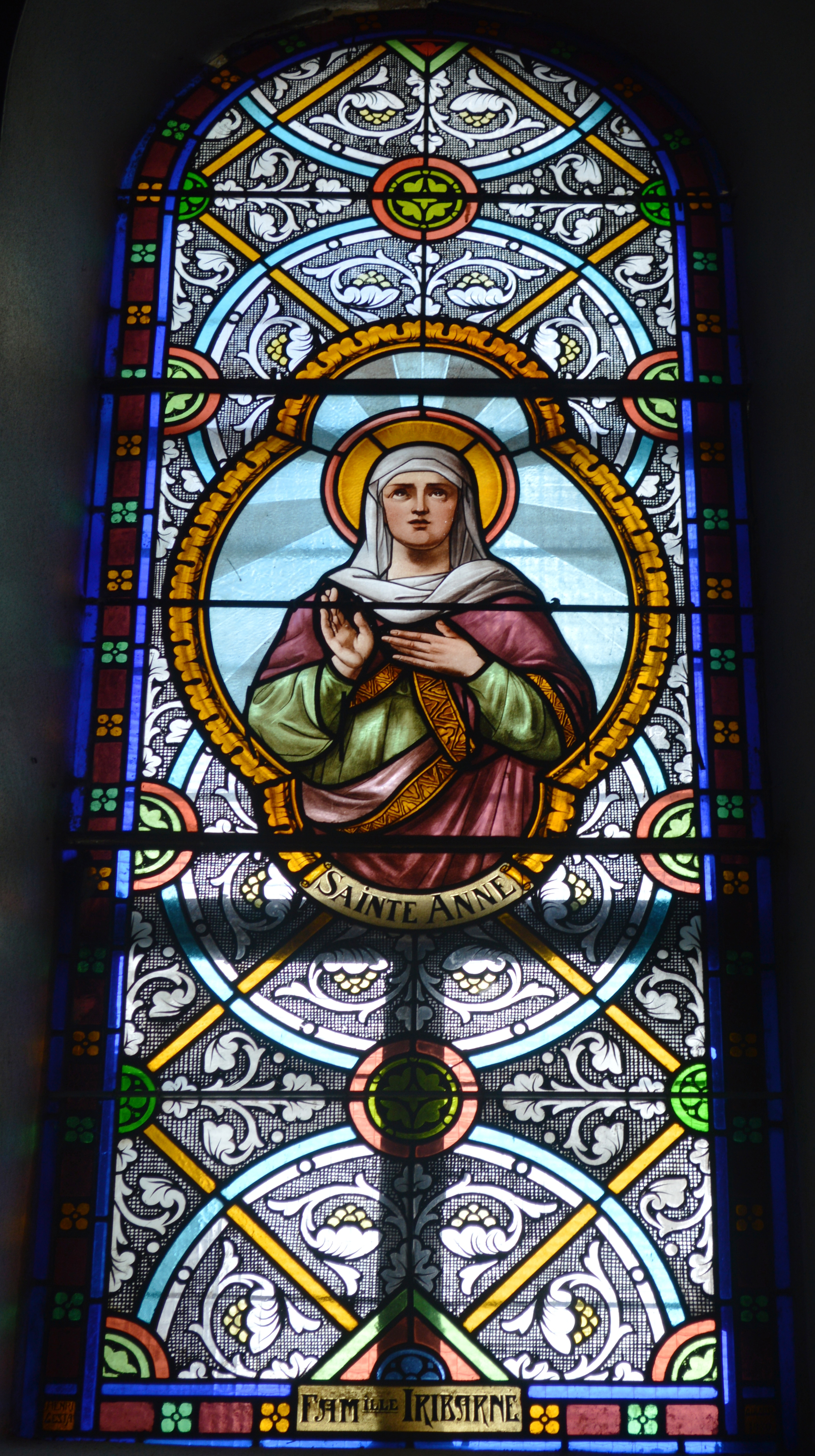
Saint Anne

== See also ==
- Communes of the Pyrénées-Atlantiques department
