= Saint-Michel, Pyrénées-Atlantiques =

Saint-Michel Eiheralarre (Basque)
- Commune
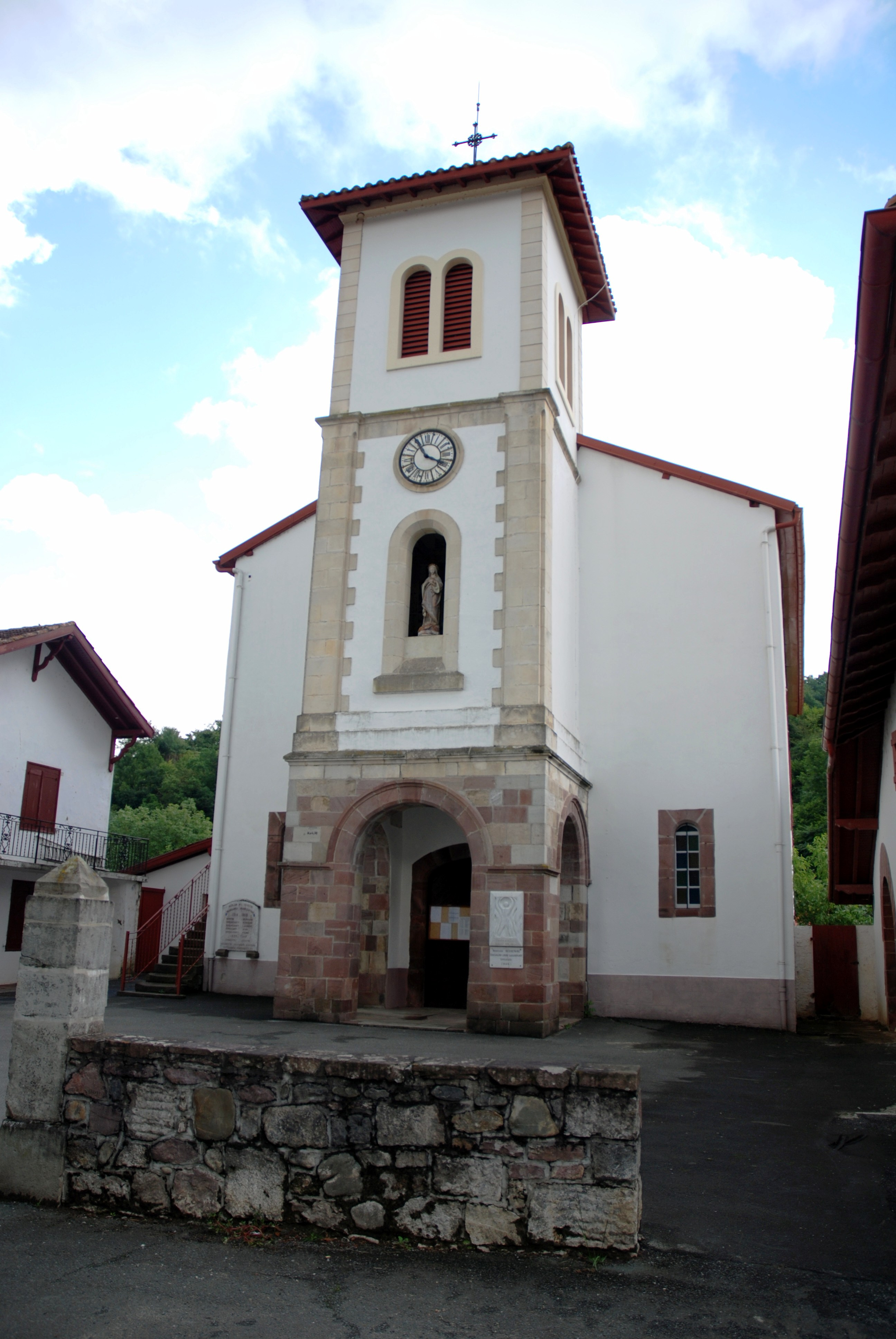
- The church of Saint-Michel

- Coat of arms
- Location of Saint-Michel
- Location within France Location within Nouvelle-Aquitaine
- Coordinates: 43°08′13″N 1°13′12″W
- Country: France
- Region: Nouvelle-Aquitaine
- Department: Pyrénées-Atlantiques
- Arrondissement: Bayonne
- Canton: Montagne Basque
- Intercommunality: CA Pays Basque

Government
  - Mayor (2022–2026): Pascal Iribarne
- Area^{1}: 30.30 km^{2} (11.70 sq mi)
- Elevation: 255 m (837 ft)
- Highest elevation: 1,417 m (4,649 ft)
- Lowest elevation: 177 m (581 ft)
- Population (2023): 290
  - Density: 9.6/km^{2} (25/sq mi)
- Time zone: UTC+01:00 (CET)
  - Summer (DST): UTC+02:00 (CEST)
- INSEE/Postal code: 64492 /64220
- ^{1} French Land Register data, which excludes lakes, ponds, glaciers > 1 km^{2} (0.386 sq mi or 247 acres) and river estuaries.

Saint-Michel (French pronunciation: [sɛ̃ miʃɛl]; Occitan: Sant-Miquel; Basque: Eiheralarre) is a commune in the Pyrénées-Atlantiques department in south-western France.

It is located in the former province of Lower Navarre. It borders Çaro to the north, Aincille and Estérençuby to the east, Uhart-Cize and Arnéguy to the west, and Spain to the south.

== See also ==
- Communes of the Pyrénées-Atlantiques department
