= Bussunarits-Sarrasquette =

Administrative division in Nouvelle-Aquitaine, France

Bussunarits-Sarrasquette Buzunaritze-Sarasketa
- Commune
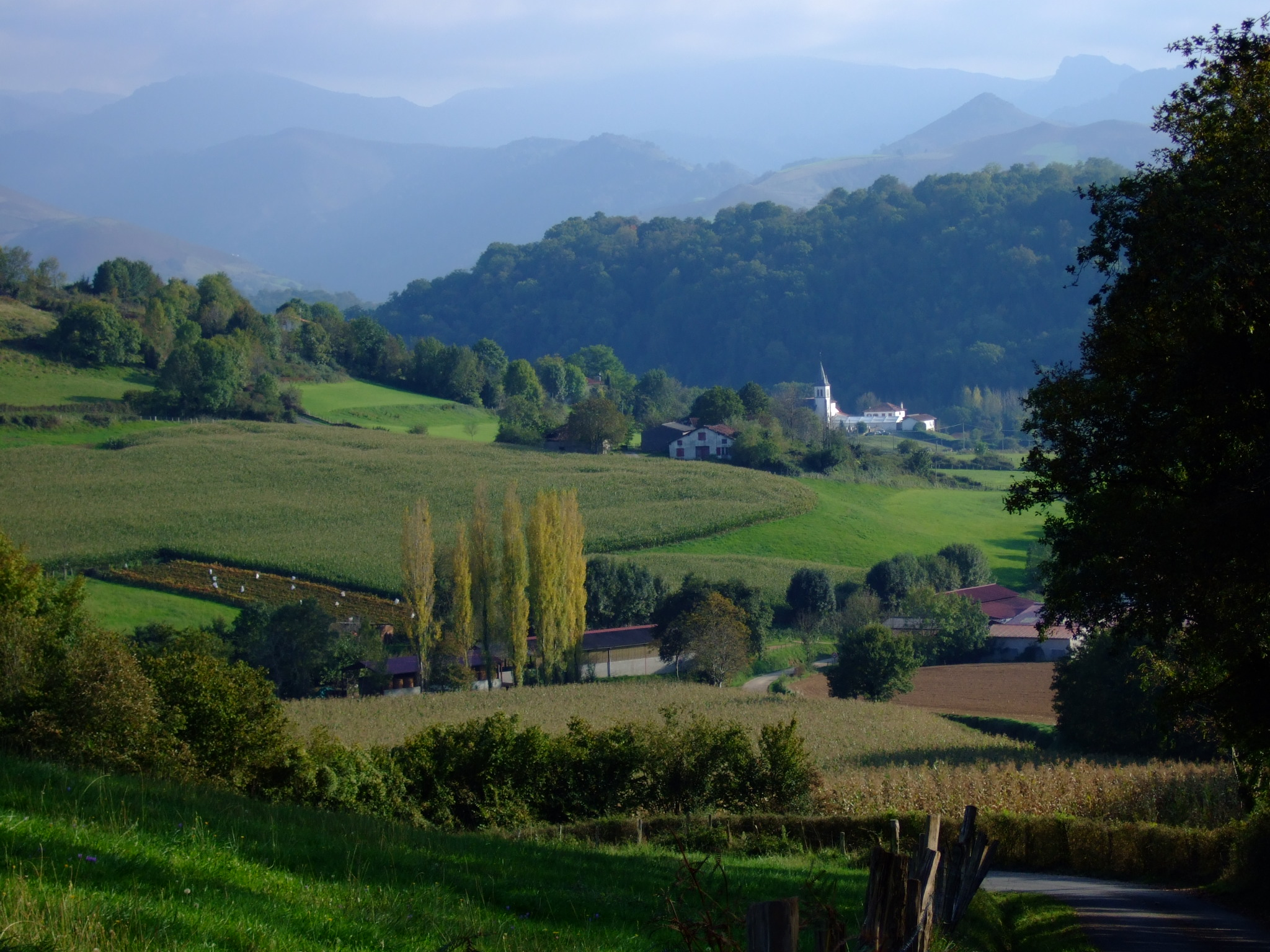
- A general view of Bussunarits

- Coat of arms
- Location of Bussunarits-Sarrasquette
- Location within France Location within Nouvelle-Aquitaine
- Coordinates: 43°09′56″N 1°10′19″W
- Country: France
- Region: Nouvelle-Aquitaine
- Department: Pyrénées-Atlantiques
- Arrondissement: Bayonne
- Canton: Montagne Basque
- Intercommunality: CA Pays Basque

Government
  - Mayor (2020–2026): Bruno Jauriberry
- Area^{1}: 12.04 km^{2} (4.65 sq mi)
- Elevation: 288 m (945 ft)
- Highest elevation: 782 m (2,566 ft)
- Lowest elevation: 195 m (640 ft)
- Population (2023): 210
  - Density: 17/km^{2} (45/sq mi)
- Time zone: UTC+01:00 (CET)
  - Summer (DST): UTC+02:00 (CEST)
- INSEE/Postal code: 64154 /64220
- ^{1} French Land Register data, which excludes lakes, ponds, glaciers > 1 km^{2} (0.386 sq mi or 247 acres) and river estuaries.

Bussunarits-Sarrasquette (French pronunciation: [bysynaʁits saʁaskɛt]; Basque: Duzunaritze-Sarasketa; Occitan: Bussunarits-Sarrasqueta) is a commune in the Pyrénées-Atlantiques department in southwestern France.

It is located in the former province of Lower Navarre.

== See also ==
- Communes of the Pyrénées-Atlantiques department
