= Estérençuby =

Estérençuby Ezterenzubi
- Commune
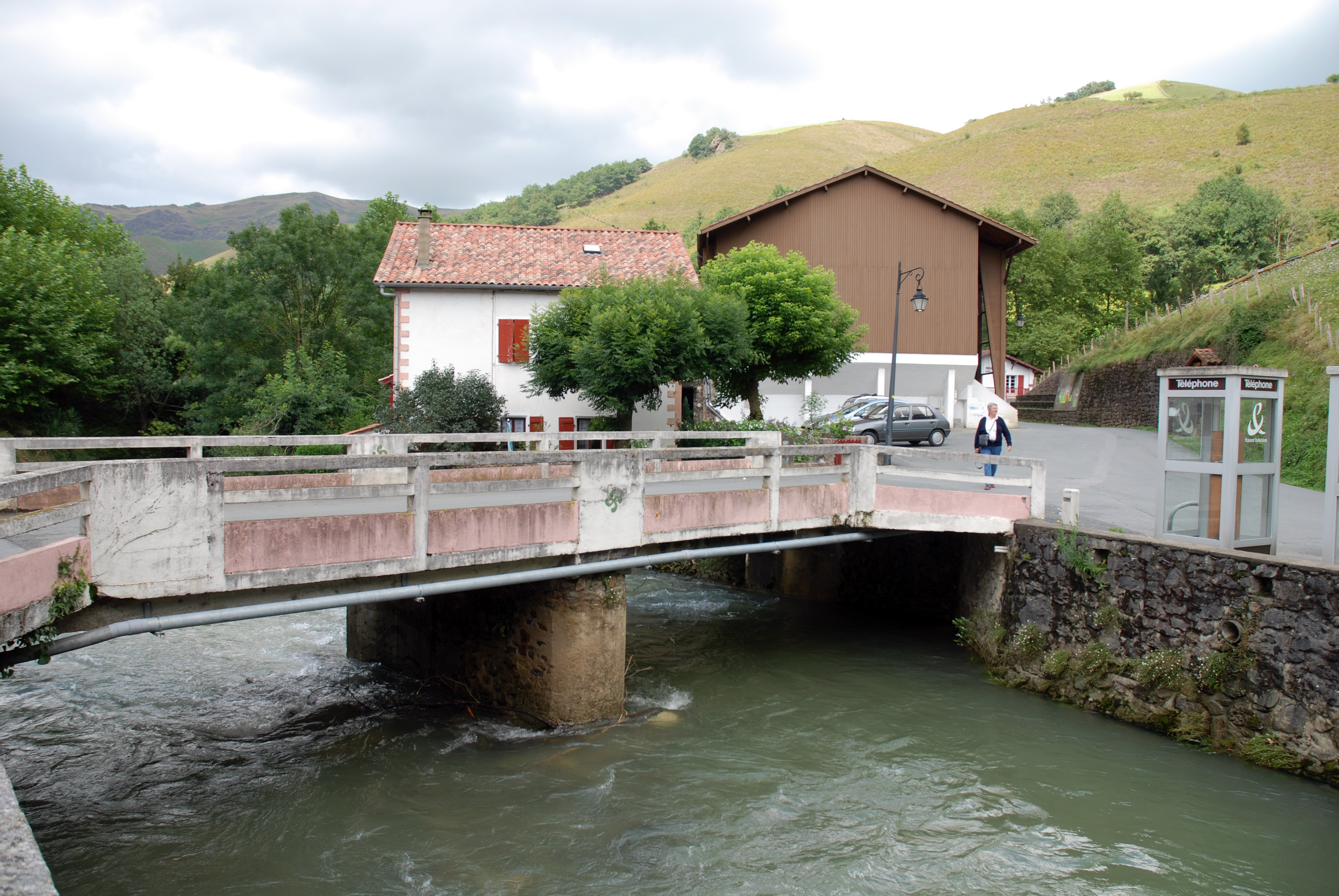
- The bridge over the Nive de Béhérobie

- Coat of arms
- Location of Estérençuby
- Location within France Location within Nouvelle-Aquitaine
- Coordinates: 43°06′19″N 1°11′40″W
- Country: France
- Region: Nouvelle-Aquitaine
- Department: Pyrénées-Atlantiques
- Arrondissement: Bayonne
- Canton: Montagne Basque
- Intercommunality: CA Pays Basque

Government
  - Mayor (2020–2026): Jean-Louis Poydessus
- Area^{1}: 45.87 km^{2} (17.71 sq mi)
- Elevation: 589 m (1,932 ft)
- Highest elevation: 1,347 m (4,419 ft)
- Lowest elevation: 219 m (719 ft)
- Population (2023): 303
  - Density: 6.61/km^{2} (17.1/sq mi)
- Time zone: UTC+01:00 (CET)
  - Summer (DST): UTC+02:00 (CEST)
- INSEE/Postal code: 64218 /64220
- ^{1} French Land Register data, which excludes lakes, ponds, glaciers > 1 km^{2} (0.386 sq mi or 247 acres) and river estuaries.

Estérençuby (French pronunciation: [ɛsteʁɛ̃sybi]; Occitan: Estarençubi; Basque: Ezterenzubi) is a commune in the Pyrénées-Atlantiques department in south-western France. It means "bridge of the gorge".

It is located in the former province of Lower Navarre.

== See also ==
- Communes of the Pyrénées-Atlantiques department
