= Olhadoko erreka =

- Location within France Location within Nouvelle-Aquitaine

Location
- Country: France

Physical characteristics
- Source
  - location: Pic d'Orhy
  - coordinates: 42°59′17″N 0°57′29″W
  - elevation: 1,600 m (5,200 ft)
- Mouth
  - location: Gave de Larrau
  - coordinates: 43°1′4″N 0°55′38″W
- Length: 9.2 km (5.7 mi)

Basin features
- Progression: Gave de Larrau→ Saison→ Gave d'Oloron→ Gaves réunis→ Adour→ Atlantic Ocean

The Olhadoko erreka is a torrential river of the French Basque Country (Pyrénées-Atlantiques), in the Southwest of France, that flows through the Holtzarte Canyon. It is 9.2 km (5.7 mi) long.

After joining the Zurkaitzegiko erreka downstream from Larrau, it forms the Gave de Larrau (the upper course of the Saison).

The Olhadoko erreka is formed at the Olhadoko Dam, from the:

- Bagosudurreko erreka, from Sakhondoa,
- Zitziratzeko erreka, from Üthürzeheta and Zitziratzea,
- Betzulako erreka from the Betzula valley.

Then it is reinforced by the:

- (R) Ardaneko erreka,
- (L) Uztarbeko erreka,
- (R) Olhadübiko erreka.
