= Gave de Larrau =

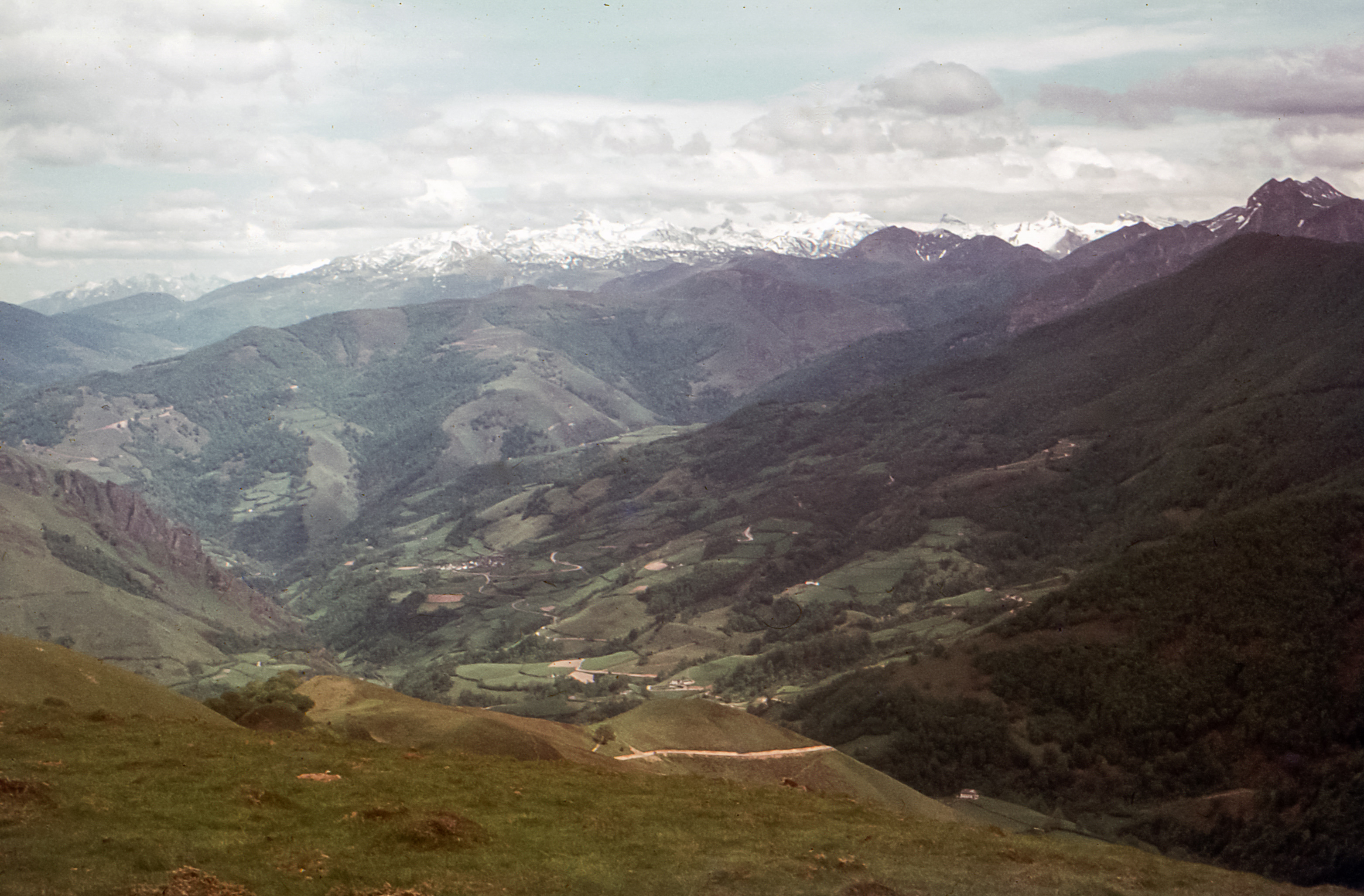

- Location within France Location within Nouvelle-Aquitaine

Location
- Country: France

Physical characteristics
- Source
  - location: Larrau
- Mouth
  - location: Saison
  - coordinates: 43°2′53″N 0°53′10″W
  - elevation: 300 m (980 ft)

Basin features
- Progression: Saison→ Gave d'Oloron→ Gaves réunis→ Adour→ Atlantic Ocean

The Gave de Larrau is a torrential river of the French Basque Country (Pyrénées-Atlantiques), in the southwest of France. It is the left tributary of the river Saison, and considered its upper course by Sandre. Its name is due to the village of Larrau.

It is formed from the confluence of the Zurkaitzegiko erreka and the Olhadoko erreka. After joining the Uhaitxa, from Sainte-Engrâce, it forms the Saison in Licq-Athérey.

Tributaries: Etxelüko erreka, Ahuntzolako erreka
