= Uhaitz =

Uhaitz or Ugaitz is a Basque word meaning 'torrential river'. It may refer to:

== Rivers ==
- Uhaitza or Uhaitz Handia 'big torrent', vernacular name of the Saison
- Uhaitxa (pronounced /uhajtʃa/), river of Sainte-Engrâce, Pyrénées-Atlantiques, France
- Uhaitza (Uraitza, Uhaitxe), river in Pagolle
- Uhaitz or Uhatz, brook in Ascain, Pyrénées-Atlantiques, France
- Uhaitz-zubi, a tributary of the Estang that rises in Jatxou

== See also ==
- Ugarre, brooks in Larrau and Esterençuby
- Uharka, brook in Sare
- Uharratea (Uharatia), tributary of the Otsarteko erreka in Iholdy
- Ugartzan, Uhartzane, a hamlet of the commune of Ossès, Lower Navarre, Pyrénées-Atlantiques, France
