= Uhaitxa =

- Location within France Location within Nouvelle-Aquitaine

Location
- Country: France

Physical characteristics
- Source
  - location: Sainte-Engrâce
- Mouth: Saison
  - coordinates: 43.0481°N 0.8859°W
- Length: 15 km (9 mi)

Basin features
- Progression: Saison→ Gave d'Oloron→ Gaves réunis→ Adour→ Atlantic Ocean

The Uhaitxa or Gave de Sainte-Engrâce, is a torrential river of the French Basque Country (Pyrénées-Atlantiques), in the Southwest of France. It is the right tributary of the Saison. It is 15.1 km (9.4 mi) long.

== Geography ==
The Uhaïtxa rises in the northeast of Sainte-Engrâce, in a valley dug by a glacier of the Quaternary. Quickly reinforced by several torrents, it flows through the village, then through a narrow valley, in a karstic landscape notched by many cañons as the Kakueta Canyon, accessible from the road.

After joining the Gave de Larrau, coming from the Pic d'Orhy, it forms the Saison in Licq-Athérey.

== Main tributaries ==
Arpideko erreka from Antzu Naba, Ehüjarreko erreka from Erraitzeko Lephua, Khakuetako erreka from Ihizkunditze, Urdaibiko erreka from the Sarimendi, Mürrübeltzeko erreka, Gahardoiko erreka...
