= Gave (placename element) =

The French word gave, as used in the western part of the Pyrenees, is a generic name referring to a torrential river. In the central part of the mountain range, the term for this is neste.

The word gave derives from the old Gascon gabar, attested as gabarrus in medieval Latin. Based on a pre-Celtic root *gab meaning 'hollow' (thus 'throat'), it refers to lower places, valleys and rivers. It is widely found in placenames of Gascony as Gabardan, Gavarret, Gavarnie, Gabas, etc. The name of the Gabali (the ancient people living in Gévaudan) is supposed to be related to this stem.

The final -r is missing because it was lost in Gascon: gabar > gabà > [ɡabɵ].

== Gaves in the Pyrenees ==
- gaves réunis
- gave d'Arrens
- gave d'Aspe
- gave d'Aspé
- gave de Baralet
- gave de Bélonce
- gave de Bious
- gave de Brousset
- gave de Cauterets
- gave de Cestrède
- gave d'Estaubé
- gave du Lavedan
- gave de Gaube
- gave de Gavarnie
- gave de Héas
- gave d'Ilhéou
- gave de Jéret
- gave de Labat de Bun or gave d'Estaing
- gave de Larrau
- gave du Lavedan
- gave de Lescun
- gave de Lourdios
- gave de Lutour
- gave du Marcadau
- gave de Mauléon
- gave d'Ossau
- gave d'Ossoue
- gave d'Oloron
- gave de Pau
- gave de Sainte-Engrâce
- gave de Soussouéou
