= Zurkaitzegiko erreka =

- Location within France Location within Nouvelle-Aquitaine

Location
- Country: France

Physical characteristics
- Source
  - location: Larrau
  - elevation: 1,400 m (4,600 ft)
- Mouth
  - location: Gave de Larrau
  - coordinates: 43°1′4″N 0°55′38″W

Basin features
- Progression: Gave de Larrau→ Saison→ Gave d'Oloron→ Gaves réunis→ Adour→ Atlantic Ocean

The Zurkaitzegiko erreka is a torrential river of the French Basque Country (Pyrénées-Atlantiques), in the Southwest of France, that flows below the village of Larrau.

After joining the Olhadoko erreka, from the Holtzarte Canyon, it forms the Gave de Larrau. Together with the Gave de Larrau, it is considered the upper course of the Saison by Sandre.

Tributaries: Nahar-ordokilako erreka, Gerrendoiko erreka, Harbeltzetako erreka, Odeizakiko erreka, Orpuneko erreka, Erroimendiko erreka, Larrandako erreka, Haritz handiko erreka, Sarrantolatzeko or Oronitzeko erreka...
