= Haute-Soule forest railway =

Coordinates: 43.10994002253844°N 0.86013825150222°W

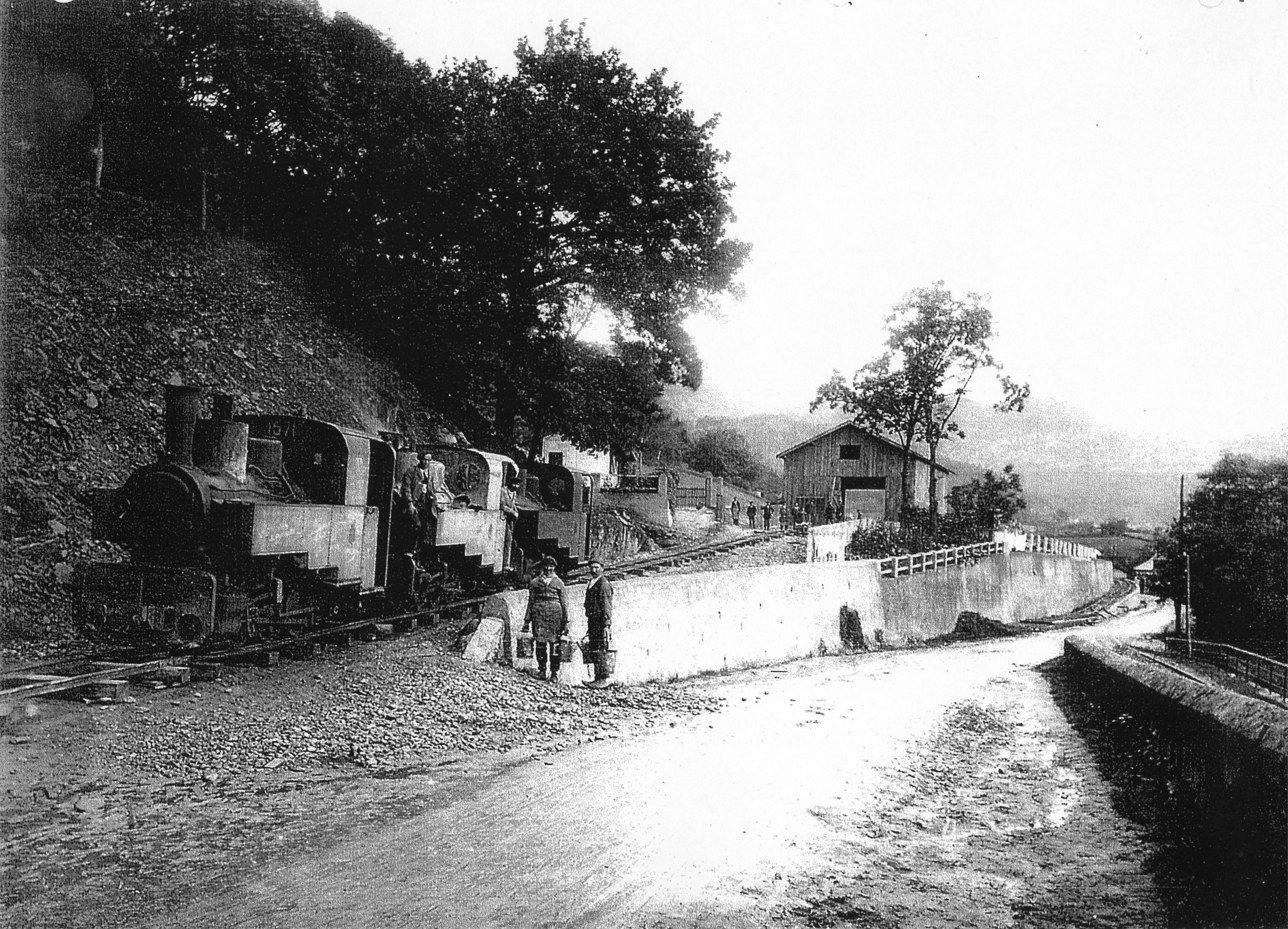
- Three Decauville-steam locomotives in Tardets-Sorholus

Technical
- Line length: 18 kilometres (11 mi)
- Track gauge: 600 mm (1 ft 11 5/8 in)

The Haute-Soule forest railway was a narrow gauge railway with a track gauge of 600 mm (1 ft 11 5/8 in), which led from Tardets-Sorholus (220 metres (720 ft) AMSL) uphill to Larrau and Saint-Engrâce (600 metres (2,000 ft) AMSL) in the upper Soule region. It operated with three Decauville steam locomotives from 1920 to 1931.

== Route of the line ==
The line was laid to supply the Lombardi-Morello sawmill in Tardets from timber cutting areas in the forests near Sainte-Engrâce and Larrau. It started at this sawmill near a station on the local railway Pau-Oloron-Mauléon (P.O.M.). The station was named after the village of Licq, about 5 kilometres (3.1 mi) up the valley.

The track bifurcated into two branches above Licq. One ran along the banks of the Gave de Larrau (Basque: Larraineko ühaitza) to a timber yard at Auberge Lojibar, 2 kilometres (1.2 mi) east of Larrau. The other ran in the valley of the river Gave de Sainte-Engrâce (Basque: Ühaïtxa) to a timber yard in the hamlet of La Caserne and one in the hamlet of Senta of Sainte-Engrâce, just below the Romanesque church.

There were several wooden bridges between the villages of Laguinge and Lichans, a bridge over the Xügarreta stream in Licq, the bridge of Hur Jünta, which was replaced by a concrete bridge, the bridge in the Kalla district of Sainte-Engrâce and the bridges at Ütürrixuria and Lojibar on the Larrau side. The only traces of the route of the former light railway are the imposing retaining walls in Tardets and Licq and some cuts between the villages of Lichans and Athérey, as well as between the village of Licq and the Auberge Lojibar.

== Operation ==
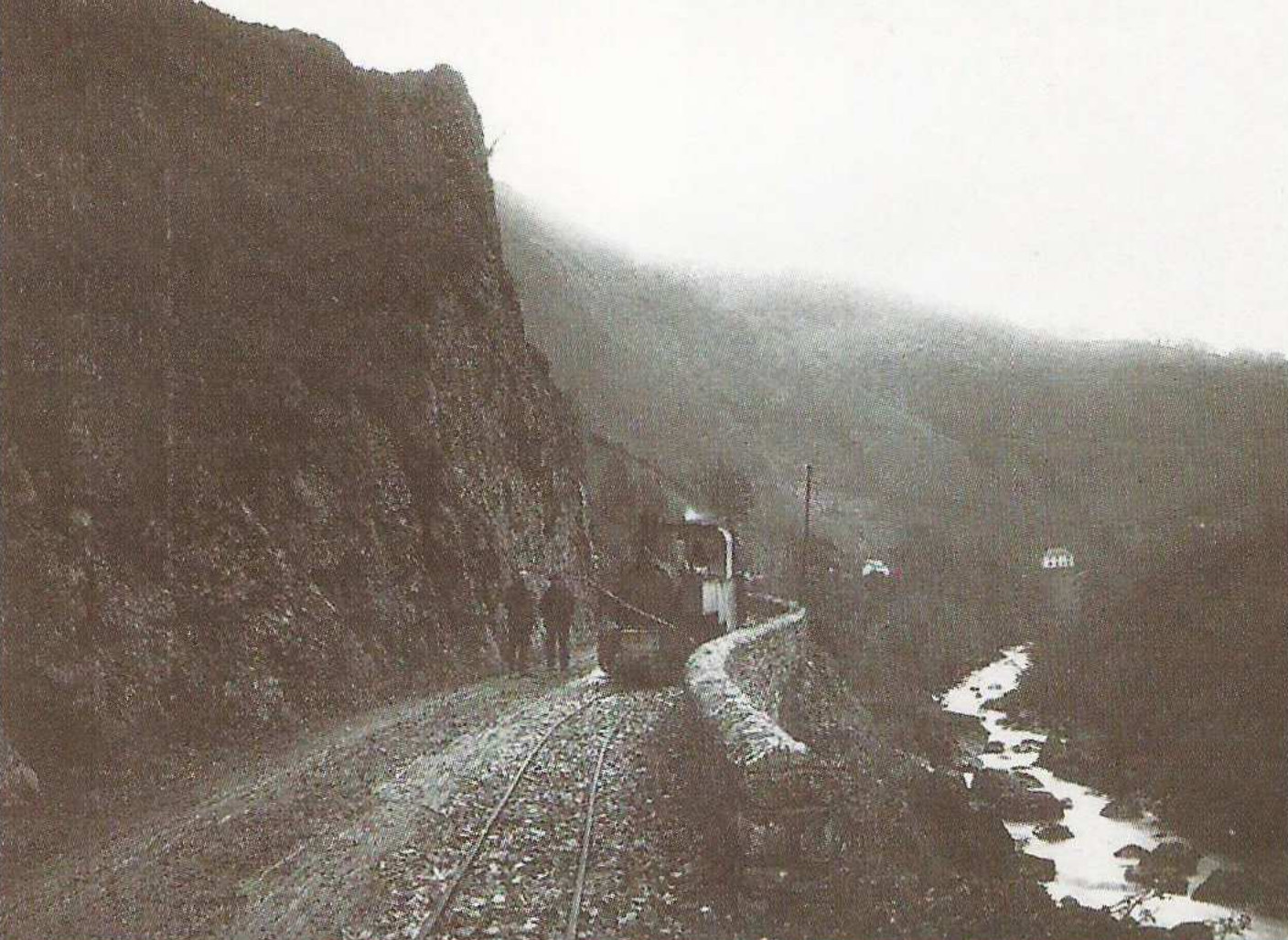
Decauville locomotive near Archilona

The line was operated by three Decauville steam locomotives type 17, each weighing 8 tonnes, which had been procured by the French Ministry of Armed Forces during First World War. In connection with the closure of the Mauléon-Oloron line of the P.O.M., the forest railway was also taken out of service at the end of 1931. Until its closure in 1962, the Lombardi-Morello company then exclusively used trucks to transport the logs.
