= Alçay-Alçabéhéty-Sunharette =

Alçay-Alçabéhéty-Sunharette Altzai-Altzabeheti-Zunharreta
- Commune
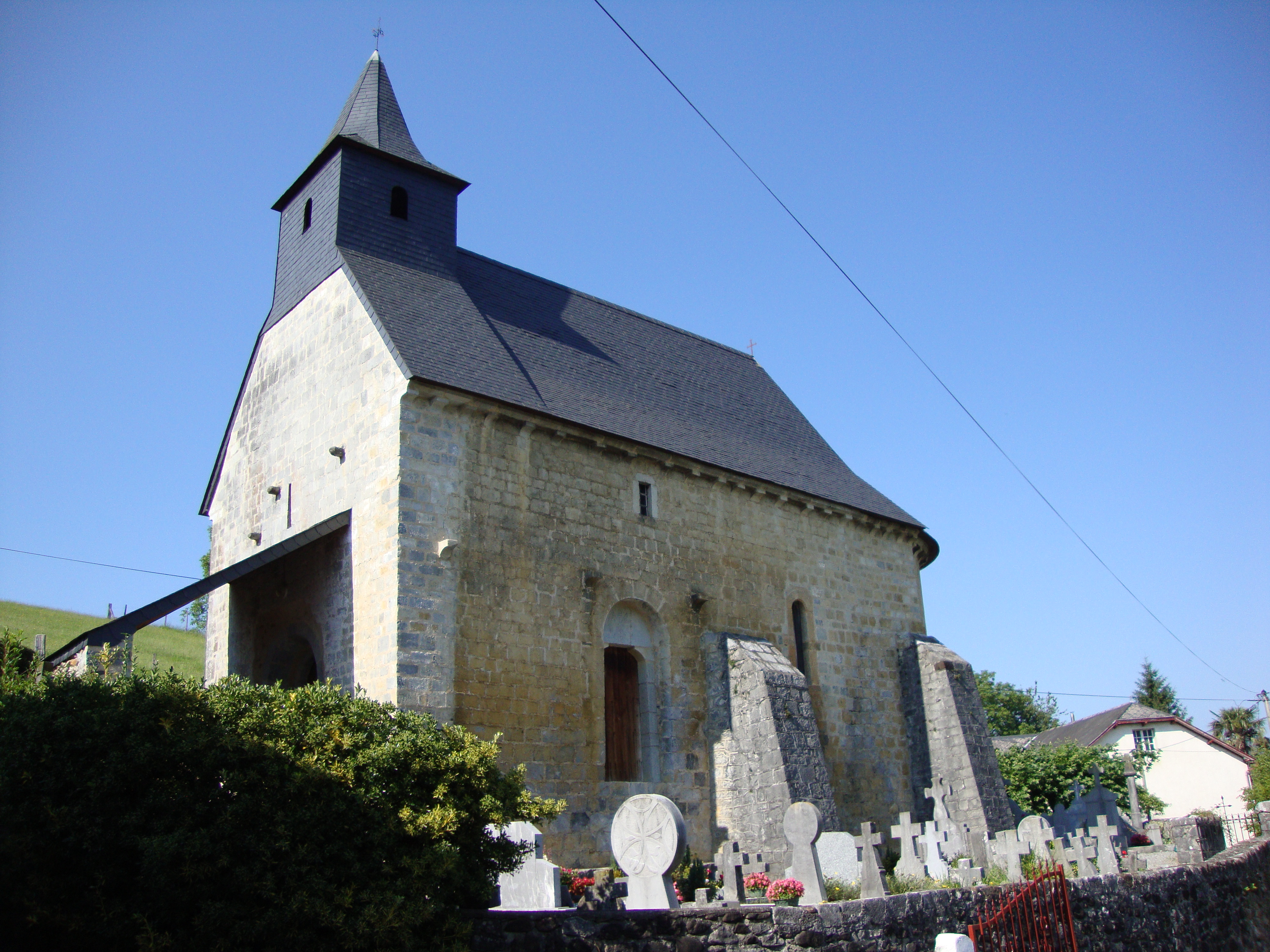
- The church of Alçabéhéty

- Coat of arms
- Location of Alçay-Alçabéhéty-Sunharette
- Location within France Location within Nouvelle-Aquitaine
- Coordinates: 43°05′46″N 0°54′27″W
- Country: France
- Region: Nouvelle-Aquitaine
- Department: Pyrénées-Atlantiques
- Arrondissement: Oloron-Sainte-Marie
- Canton: Montagne Basque
- Intercommunality: Pays Basque

Government
  - Mayor (2020–2026): Anicet Erreçarret
- Area^{1}: 34.40 km^{2} (13.28 sq mi)
- Elevation: 344 m (1,129 ft)
- Highest elevation: 1,535 m (5,036 ft)
- Lowest elevation: 217 m (712 ft)
- Population (2023): 206
  - Density: 5.99/km^{2} (15.5/sq mi)
- Time zone: UTC+01:00 (CET)
  - Summer (DST): UTC+02:00 (CEST)
- INSEE/Postal code: 64015 /64470
- ^{1} French Land Register data, which excludes lakes, ponds, glaciers > 1 km^{2} (0.386 sq mi or 247 acres) and river estuaries.

Alçay-Alçabéhéty-Sunharette (French pronunciation: [alsaj alsabe.eti synaʁɛt]; Occitan: Aucet-Aucet Juson-Sunarreta; Basque: Altzai-Altzabeheti-Zunharreta) is a commune in the Pyrénées-Atlantiques department in the Nouvelle-Aquitaine region in southwestern France.

== Geography ==
=== Location ===
Alçay-Alçabéhéty-Sunharette is located in the former province of Soule. It is located some 35 km west by south-west of Oloron-Sainte-Marie and 10 km north of Larrau.

=== Access ===
The commune can be accessed by the small D247 road from the village to Tardets-Sorholus in the north-east. The D149 branches off this road in the commune and goes north to Camou-Cihigue. There is also the D117 road which goes west from the village to Mendive.

=== Hydrography ===
Located in the drainage basin of the Adour, most of the southern border of the commune is formed by the Alphoura river (18 km long) which also flows through the village and continues northeast to join the Saison near Alos-Sibas-Abense. The Alphoura is fed by many tributaries rising in the commune including the Azaléguy and Ardounc. The Escalérako erreka rises in the south and flows west with its many tributaries.

Paul Raymond mentioned the Arangaïxa, a brook that rises at Alçay and flows into the Alphoura.

=== Localities and hamlets ===
- Aguer (Barn)
- Albinzé (cayolar)
- Alçabéhéty
- Alçay
- Ampo
- Andoche (cayolar)
- Arangaitz (Pass)
- Arhansus (cayolar)
- Arhex Borde
- Atheis
- Azaléguy
- Azaléguiko Karbia (Cave)
- Bagadoya
- Bagazaguita (cayolar)
- Bagothusta
- Belhy
- Berrayde
- Bethalia
- Bidalunia
- Bordagagna
- Borda Iribarneko
- Bordapia
- Burdin Olatzé (cayolar)
- Burgance
- Çaro
- Chaldupia
- Chuburu
- Croix Garat (la)
- Elichabeborda
- Eltzegagnia (cayolar)
- Erbinia
- Espoulapia
- Esquirassy (district)
- Etcheberri Borda
- Etcheverry
- Etchecopar Borda
- Eyhéraber
- Ezpalako Larria
- Goyheneix Borde
- Gutux Borde
- Habrague (cayolar)
- Handia (Borda)
- Haquits (Mill)
- Harizmendy
- Harristolatzia
- Houretaborda
- Ibarburia (Pass)
- Ibarria
- Illaberria
- Inharchoury
- Irriko Borda
- Kamitchel
- Kharalda
- Lapistoy
- Larramendia
- Laxunia
- Laze
- Lechardoy
- Lecharria (cayolar)
- Lekayborda
- Leziague (fountain)
- Lomendi
- Luchiloa
- Lucu
- Lutogagne
- Maraizolatzé
- Méthola
- Miranda
- Néquézaurborda
- Ourdanberhartia
- Oxapuria
- Oxibar (Pass)
- Pista Uthurria
- Poyuko Borda
- Sallaberriko borda
- Sobieta (Grange)
- Sunharette
- Thipinka
- Ursoy (cayolar)
- Utzidoy
- Uztarila (cayolar)
- Uztubulia

== Toponymy ==
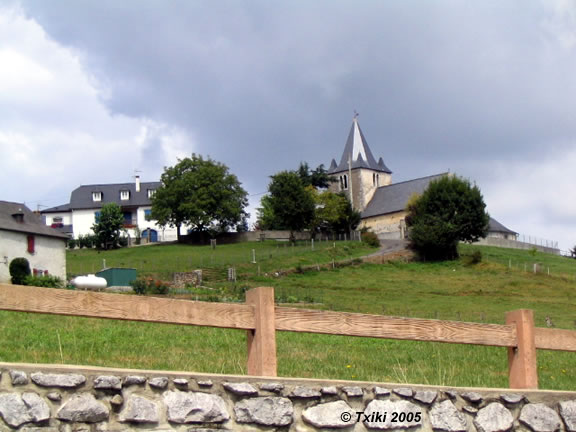
View of Alçay village

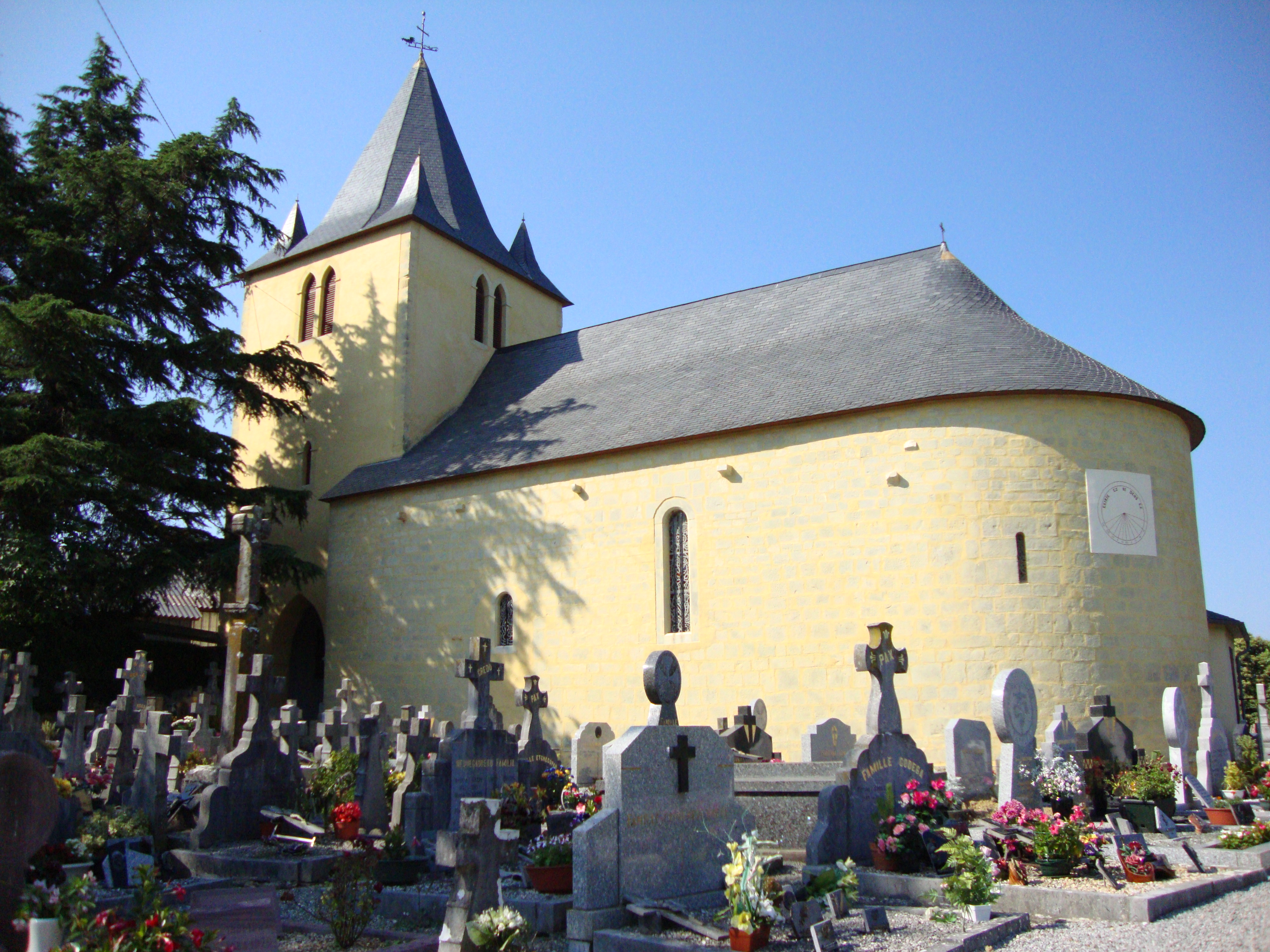
Saint Peter's Church and the cemetery at Alçay

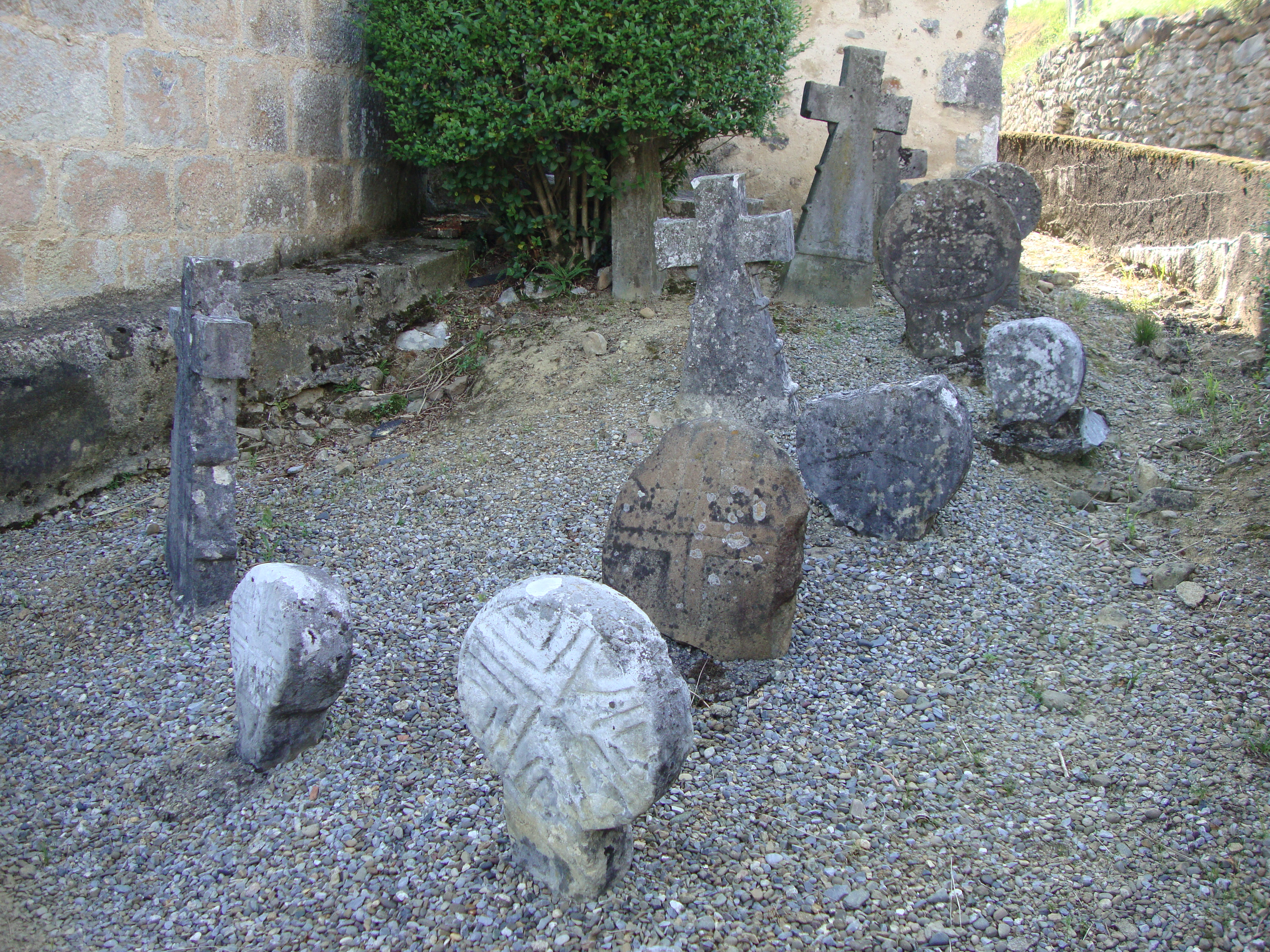
Old Hilarri at Alçabéhéty

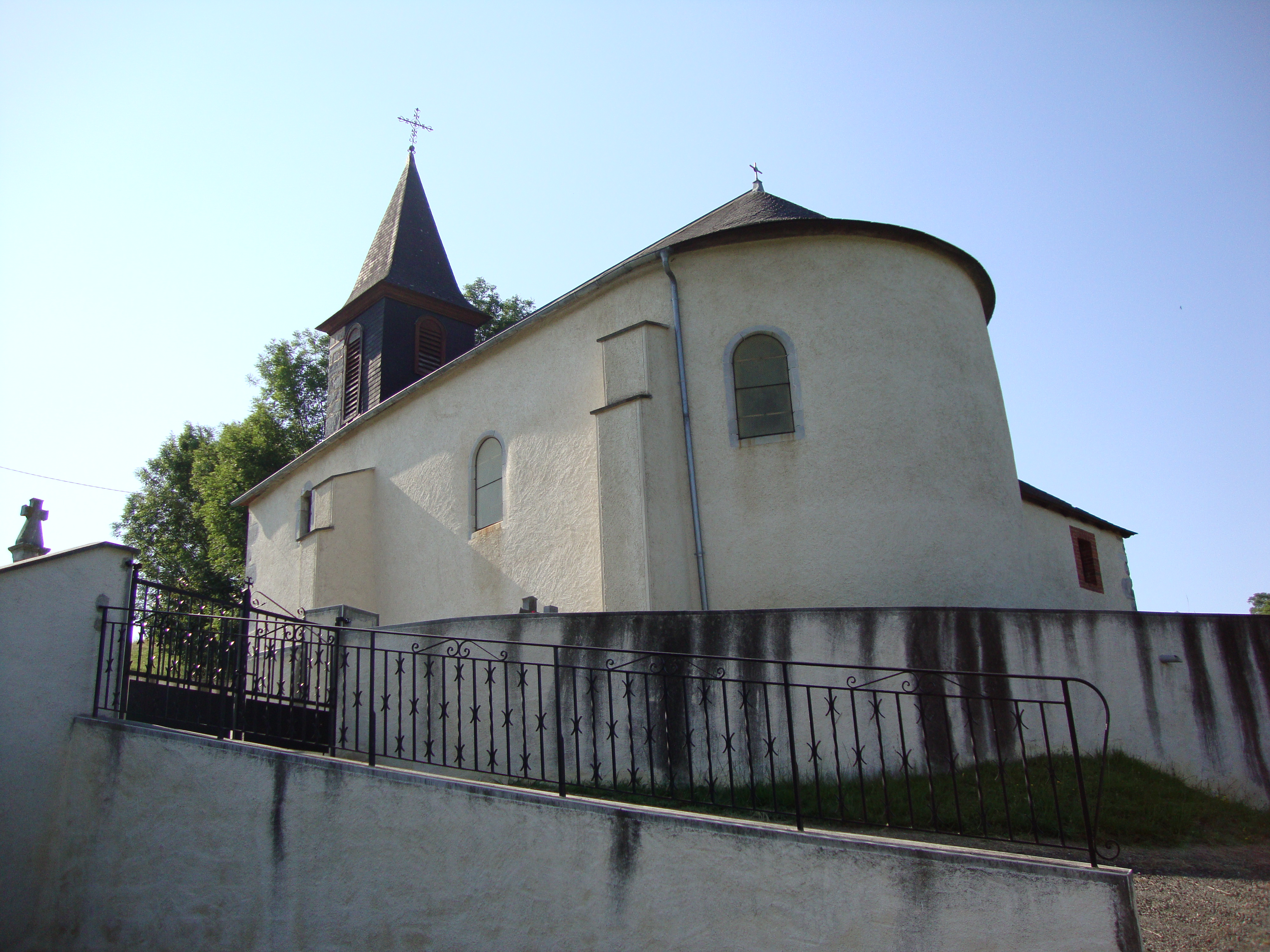
The Church at Sunharette

The commune name in Basque is Altzai-Altzabeheti-Zunharreta.

According to Jean-Baptiste Orpustan, the base (h)altz meaning "aulne" was used for both the toponyms Alcay and Alçabéhéty. beheti means "at the bottom".

The name Sunharette comes from the Basque zunhar (Name from Soule meaning "elm" or "poplar") using the romanized locative suffix ette meaning the "place of elm".

The following table details the origins of the commune name and other names in the commune.

Name	Spelling	Date	Source	Page	Origin	Description
Alçay	Aucet Suson	1337	Orpustan	196		Village
	Alsay	1385	Raymond	4	Duchesne	
	Ausset-Suson	1479	Raymond	4	Ohix	
	Alçay	1520	Orpustan	196		
	Aucet Suson	1690	Orpustan	196		
	Auset Suson	1690	Orpustan	196		
	Alsai	17th century	Raymond	4	Chronicles	
Alçabéhéty	Aucet Juson	1337	Orpustan	196		Village
	Ausec-Juson	1385	Raymond	4	Duchesne	
	Auset Juzon	1385	Orpustan	196		
	Auzat Juzon	1385	Orpustan	196		
	Aucet Juzon	1690	Orpustan	196		
	Alcabehety	1793	Cassini1			
	Alçabehety	1801	Cassini1		Bulletin des lois	
Sunharette	Sunarte	1337	Orpustan	196		Village
	Sunharrete	1475	Raymond	165	Ohix	
	Sunharrette	1690	Orpustan	196		
	Sunarrette	1690	Orpustan	196		
	Sonharette	1793	Cassini2			
	Sunharrette	1801	Cassini2		Bulletin des lois	
Arangaïxa	L'Arangaïxa	1863	Raymond	8		Stream
Arhansus	Arhansus	1863	Raymond	10		Wood
Athaguy	Athagui	1520	Raymond	16	Soule	Farm
	Atagui	1520	Raymond	16	Soule	
Belhy	Belhy	1863	Raymond	27		Mountain
Burunolatxé	Le Col de Burunolatxé	1863	Raymond	37		Pass
Couhourre	Couhourre	1863	Raymond	53		Wood
Esquirassy	Esquirassy	1863	Raymond	62		Mountain
Etcheverry	Etcheberri	17th century	Raymond	63	Chronicles	Fief, under the Viscounts of Soule
Handiague	Handiague	1863	Raymond	75		Mountain

Sources:

- Orpustan: Jean-Baptiste Orpustan, New Basque Toponymy
- Raymond: Topographic Dictionary of the Department of Basses-Pyrenees, 1863, on the page numbers indicated in the table. (in French)
- Cassini1: Alçabéhéty on the Ldh/EHESS/Cassini database
- Cassini2: Sunharette on the Ldh/EHESS/Cassini database

Origins:

- Duchesne: Duchesne collection volume CXIV
- Ohix: Contracts retained by Ohix, Notary of Soule
- Chronicles: Chronicles of Arthez-Lassalle
- Soule: Custom of Soule

== History ==
In 1790 Sunharette was the chief town of a canton which was part of the District of Mauleon. The canton included the communes of Alçay-Alçabéhéty-Sunharette, Alos-Sibas-Abense, Camou-Cihigue, Etchebar, Lacarry-Arhan-Charritte-de-Haut, Lichans-Sunhar, and Ossas-Suhare.

In 1833, the three communes of Alçay, Alçabéhéty, and Sunharette merged to form a single joint commune.

=== Heraldry ===
Arms of Alçay-Alçabéhéty-Sunharette	Blazon: Azure, a wolf argent passant at dexter in front of a beehive of Or to sinister and accompanied by 6 bees at dexter chief, 3 bees at sinister chief, one bee at sinister, and 4 bees in base the same.

== Administration ==
List of Successive Mayors

From	To	Name
1983	2001	Arnaud Dascon
2001	2026	Anicet Erreçarret

=== Inter-communality ===
The town is part of seven intercommunal organisations:

- the Communauté d'agglomération du Pays Basque
- the association to support Basque culture;
- the SIVOM of the canton of Tardets;
- the intercommunal association of the gaves d'Oloron and Mauléon
- the SIVU for Tourism in Haute-Soule and Barétous;
- the AEP association for Soule Country
- the association for remediation of Soule Country

== Population ==
Historical population
Year	Pop.	±% p.a.
1968	298	—
1975	262	−1.82%
1982	283	+1.11%
1990	273	−0.45%
1999	246	−1.15%
2007	219	−1.44%
2012	228	+0.81%
2017	226	−0.18%
2023	206	−1.53%
Source: INSEE

== Economy ==
Activity is mainly focused on agriculture (livestock and pasture). The town is part of the Appellation d'origine contrôlée (AOC) zone of Ossau-Iraty cheese.

== Culture and heritage ==
=== Civil heritage ===
The commune has two sites that are registered as historical monuments:

- The Seven Ibarnaba Tumuli in the Esquirassy district
- The Ten Ibarletta Tumuli in the Esquirassy district

Other sites of interest

- The Gaztelu zahar (Basque meaning "fortified place") of Maide korralea meaning "the enclosure of Maide" is attributed to Maidé, mythological beings incorporating some of the traits of Jentils and Laminak.

=== Religious Heritage ===
- The Romanesque Parish Church of Saint-Pierre (Middle Ages) is registered as an historical monument. The church contains a Processional Cross (16th century) which is registered as an historical object.

=== Environmental heritage ===
- The Belhygagne peaks (also called the peak of Vultures) and Gaztelia are the highest points in the commune at, respectively, 1,072 and 1,345 metres high.

== See also ==
- Communes of the Pyrénées-Atlantiques department
