= Barhoue =

Barhoue, probably from an old *Barrhun(a) 'lower place', is a place name of the French Basque Country that may refer to:

- the lower course of the Saison or Pettarra
- the mande of Barhoue, in the north of Saint-Palais, by analogy with the former, the original name being *Barrhurte (Barhourt, 1316).
