= Château de Montréal (Peyrehorade) =

French castle

Coordinates: 43°32′38″N 1°06′15″W

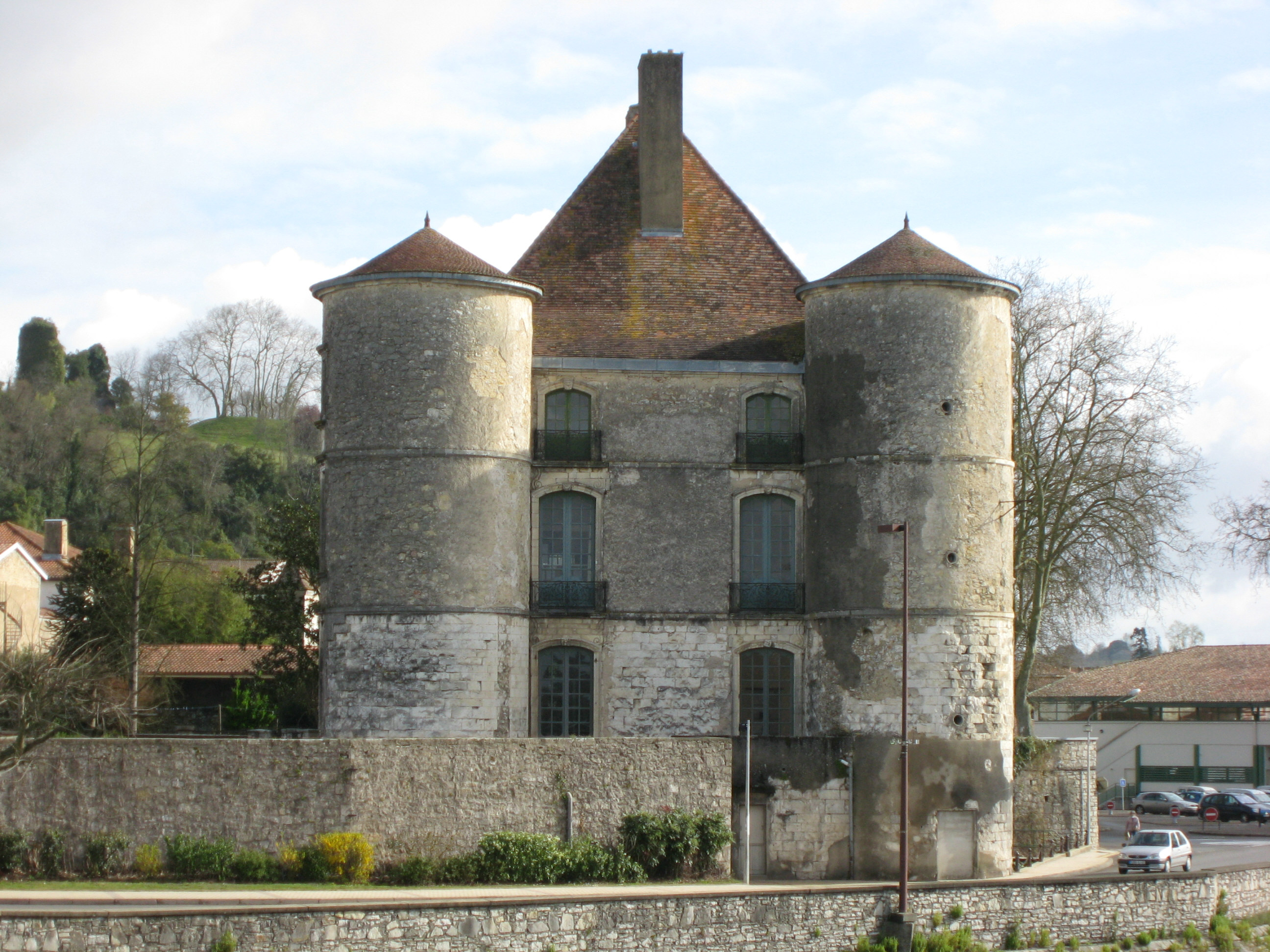
Château de Montréal

Château de Montréal, also known as château d'Orthe, is a château in the commune of Peyrehorade, Landes, Nouvelle-Aquitaine, France. It dates to the 16th century and is a national historical monument (Monument historique).

== History ==
A castle stood on the site since the 13th century, known as Château d'Orthe, which controlled the river traffic on the Gaves reunis.

The castle was slighted in 1515. Luce-Antoinette d'Aspremont, Viscountess of Orthe renamed the castle in honour of her husband Jean, Count of Montreal in the 18th century.

It served as the residence of the Viscounts of Orthe, after moving from their previous residence of Château d'Aspremont.

The buildings have successively been used as a military hospital, a convent, a technical college and today serves as the Peyrehorade town hall.
