= Port de Larrau =

Mountain pass in France and Spain

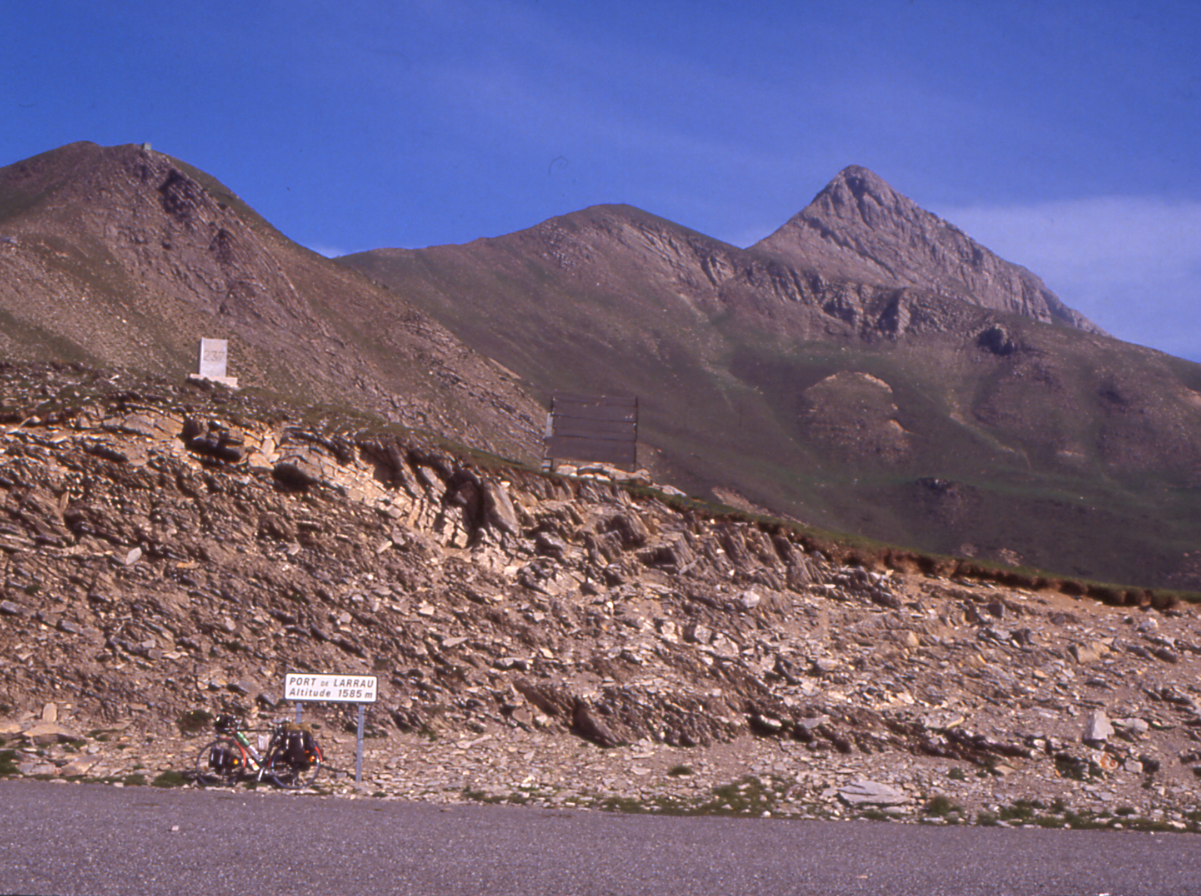
- Orhi from the Port de Larrau. A sign with the name and elevation of the pass is visible in the centre-left.

- Location within Pyrenees
- Elevation: 1,578 metres (5,177 ft)
- Traversed by: D26/NA2100

Third Approach
- Location: Pyrénées-Atlantiques, France; Navarre, Spain
- Range: Pyrenees
- Coordinates: 42°58′26″N 0°59′38″W

The Port de Larrau (Puerto de Larrau) (elevation 1,578 m (5,177 ft)) is a mountain pass on the France – Spain border in the western Pyrenees between the department of Pyrénées-Atlantiques, France and Navarre, Spain. The climb from the French side was used in the 2007 Tour de France.

The true summit of the pass is at 1,585 m (5,200 ft) and is near the Pic d’Orhi (2,017 m (6,617 ft)), the most westerly mountain over 2000m in the Pyrenees. In the Basque language the pass is known as Uthurzehetako Lepoua.

== Details of the climb ==
The pass is situated south east of Saint-Jean-Pied-de-Port. Starting from Auberge de Laugibar (north east), the Port de Larrau is 15.3 km (9.5 mi) long. Over this distance, the climb is 1,205 m (3,953 ft) (an average of 7.9%) with long sections at over 10% and the maximum gradient of 13% near the summit. Between the village of Larrau and the summit the climb passes over the Col d’Erroymendi at 1,362 m (4,469 ft).

Starting from Ochagavía (Navarre, Spain), the Puerto de Larrau is 19.3 km (12.0 mi) long with a 100 m. tunnel near the summit. Over this distance, the climb is 815 m (2,674 ft) (an average of 4.2%) with a maximum of 8%.

== Tour de France ==
The climb first appeared in the Tour de France in 1996, when it became the final Tour de France climb to be ridden by five-times race winner Miguel Indurain, who lost out heavily here.

The climb from the south featured in the 2007 Tour de France on the 218.5 km (135.8 mi) stage 16 from Orthez to Gourette Col d'Aubisque.

=== Appearances in Tour de France ===
Year	Stage	Category	Start	Finish	Leader at the summit
1996	17	HC	Argelès-Gazost	Pamplona	Richard Virenque (FRA)
2007	16	HC	Orthez	Gourette-Col d'Aubisque	José Vicente García (ESP)
