= Zihiga =

Zihiga is a Basque toponym referring to high places. It is based on the word zihi (goad):

- Camou-Cihigue (Gamere-Zihiga in Basque), a commune of Pyrénées-Atlantiques, France
- Zihiga (1 193 m), a mount in the Arbaille Massif.
- Zihigolatze and Zihigolha, pastoral installations.
