= Château d'Aspremont =

Former French castle

Outline of the ruins of the Château d'Aspremont

Château d'Aspremont is a ruined motte and bailey castle dating from the 11th century, located in Peyrehorade in the Landes department of the Nouvelle-Aquitaine region of France.

== History ==
An initial motte-and-bailey castle was constructed in the first quarter of the 11th century by the Viscounts of Orthe, a branch of the family of the Viscounts of Dax.

In the mid-13th century, the original castle was replaced by a seven-sided keep. The castle was ultimately ruined in 1569, replaced as the residence of the Viscounts of Orthe by a new castle, later known as Château de Montréal.
