= Alos-Sibas-Abense =

Alos-Sibas-Abense Aloze-Ziboze-Onizegaine
- Commune
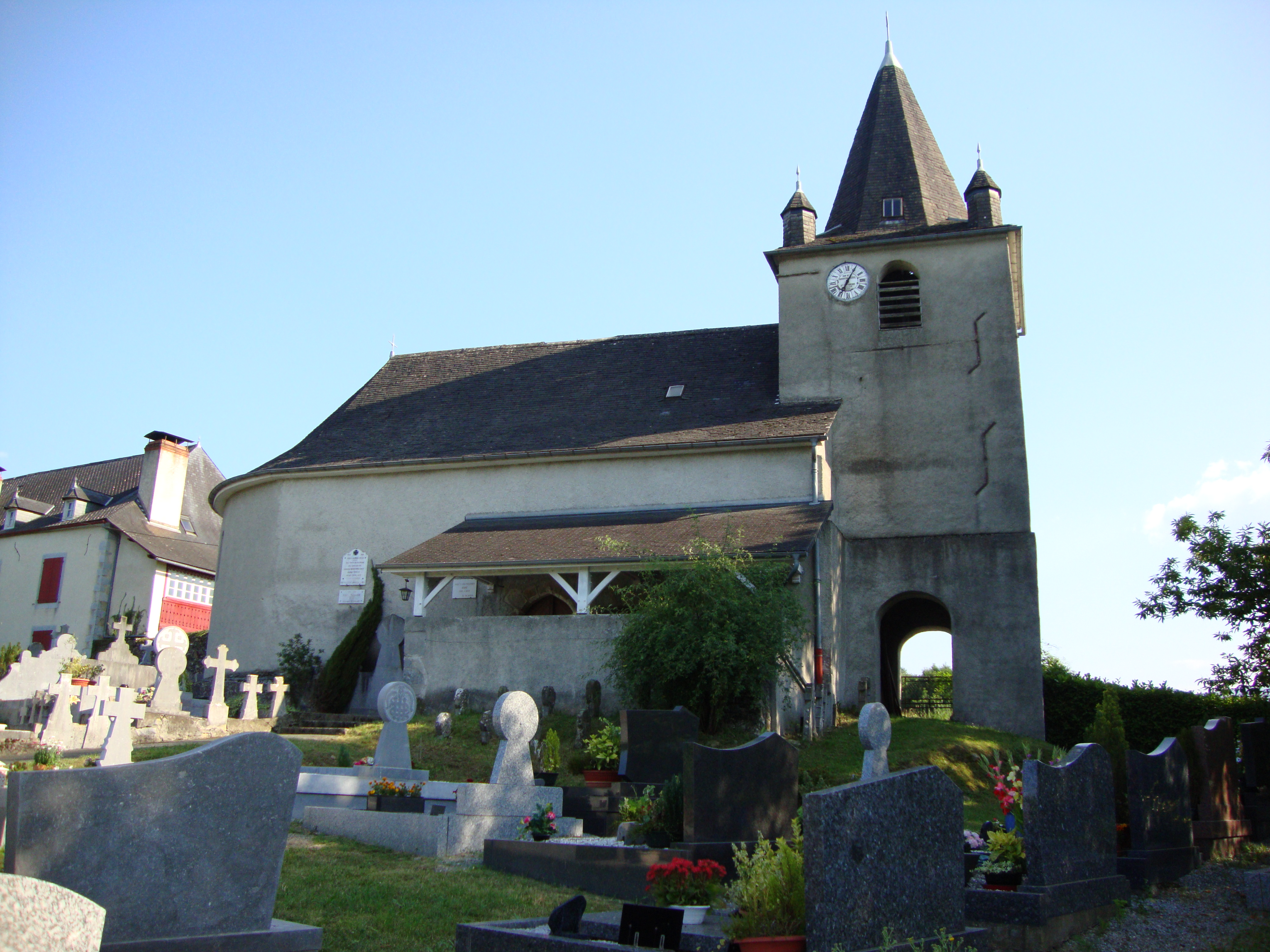
- The church of Alos

- Coat of arms
- Location of Alos-Sibas-Abense
- Location within France Location within Nouvelle-Aquitaine
- Coordinates: 43°07′12″N 0°52′29″W
- Country: France
- Region: Nouvelle-Aquitaine
- Department: Pyrénées-Atlantiques
- Arrondissement: Oloron-Sainte-Marie
- Canton: Montagne Basque
- Intercommunality: CA Pays Basque

Government
  - Mayor (2020–2026): Jean-Pierre Iriart
- Area^{1}: 5.78 km^{2} (2.23 sq mi)
- Elevation: 221 m (725 ft)
- Highest elevation: 414 m (1,358 ft)
- Lowest elevation: 204 m (669 ft)
- Population (2023): 291
  - Density: 50.3/km^{2} (130/sq mi)
- Time zone: UTC+01:00 (CET)
  - Summer (DST): UTC+02:00 (CEST)
- INSEE/Postal code: 64017 /64470
- ^{1} French Land Register data, which excludes lakes, ponds, glaciers > 1 km^{2} (0.386 sq mi or 247 acres) and river estuaries.

Alos-Sibas-Abense (French pronunciation: [alɔs sibas abɛ̃s]; Basque: Aloze-Ziboze-Onizegaine; Occitan: Alòs) is a commune in the Pyrénées-Atlantiques department in the Nouvelle-Aquitaine region in southwestern France.

It is located in the former province of Soule.

== Geography ==
Alos-Sibas-Abense is located some 90 km south-east of Bayonne and 80m km west of Lourdes. The D918 road runs down the eastern border of the commune, but does not enter. Access to the commune is on road D247 from Alcay-Alcabehety-Sunharette in the southwest which runs through the heart of the commune to the village. It then continues to the southeast linking with the D918 at Tardets-Sorholus. Most of the commune is farmland with some forest and it has a network of country roads covering most of the commune.

=== Hydrography ===
Located in the Drainage basin of the Adour, the Saison river passes along and forms the eastern border of the commune parallel with the D918 road. The Aphoura stream (18 km), which is fed by the Ardounc, the Batasse (10.1 km), the Laritolle, the Jaga, and the Uthurrotche erreka, flows near the village and to the Saisson.

=== Places and hamlets ===
- Abense
- Althondo
- Ansola
- Barnech
- Basterrèche
- Basterreix
- Belle-Sise
- Canderats
- Choy-Cantaguia
- Curutchet
- Domec
- Eskiéta
- Etchandy
- Eyhéra
- Hastoy
- Mendiondoa
- Mendisquer
- Ohix
- La Papeterie
- Péko Urupéa
- Quihillaborda
- La Salle
- Samalgagna
- Sibas
- Uhalte-Borde

=== Toponymy ===
The commune name in Basque is Aloze-Ziboze-Onizegaine.

The Basque form of Sibas can be Ziboz(e) or Ziborotz(e).

Jean-Baptiste Orpustan suggested that Abense came from a Roman phonetic change to the Basque Oniz > onise > oénse > auénse > abense. The base of the name is the oronym ona, also present in Bayonne and Oneix. The modern Basque form (Onizegañia, Onizegañe or Omiz(e)) are equivalent to "Upper" (gain(e)a > gañia).

Brigitte Jobbé-Duval suggests that Oniz is the name of a noble Basque family.

The following table details the origins of the commune name and other names in the commune.

Name	Spelling	Date	Source	Page	Origin	Description
Alos	Alos	1327	Orpustan	190		Village
	Alos	1338	Orpustan	190		
	Alos	1375	Raymond	5	Luntz	
	Alos in terra de Soule	1405	Raymond	5	Gascon roles	
	Alos in terra de Sole	1405	Orpustan	190		
	Alos	1690	Orpustan	190		
	Alos	1750	Cassini			
Sibas	Sivas	1178	Raymond	161	Duchesne	Village
	Sivas	1327	Orpustan	191		
	Sent-Martin de Silvez	1520	Raymond	161	Soule	
	Sibas	1690	Orpustan	191		
	Sivas	1690	Orpustan	191		
	Sibas	1750	Cassini			
Abense	Evense	1337	Orpustan	189		Village
	Abense prope Tardetz	1385	Raymond	2	Duchesne	
	Avense pres tardets	1520	Orpustan	189		
	prop Tardetz Avense	1690	Orpustan	189		
	Abense de Haut	1750	Cassini			
	Abense de Haut	1793	EHESS			
	Abeuze	1801	EHESS		Bulletin des lois	
	Abense-de-Haut	1863	Raymond	1		
Domec	Domec	1385	Raymond	55	Duchesne	Fief, depended on the Viscounts of Soule and its title counted as one of the ten potestats of Soule
Mendisquer	Menrisqueta	1385	Raymond	111	Duchesne	Fief, vassal of the Viscounts of Soule
La Salle	La Sale de Sibas	1455	Raymond	153	Duchesne	Fief, vassal of the Viscounts of Soule

Sources:

- Orpustan: Jean-Baptiste Orpustan, New Basque Toponymy
- Raymond: Topographic Dictionary of the Department of Basses-Pyrenees, 1863, on the page numbers indicated in the table. (in French)
- Cassini: 1750 Cassini Map (in French)
- EHESS: Des villages de Cassini aux communes d'aujourd'hui: Commune data sheet Abense, EHESS (in French).

Origins:

- Luntz:
- Soule: Customs of Soule
- Duchesne: Duchesne collection volume CXIV
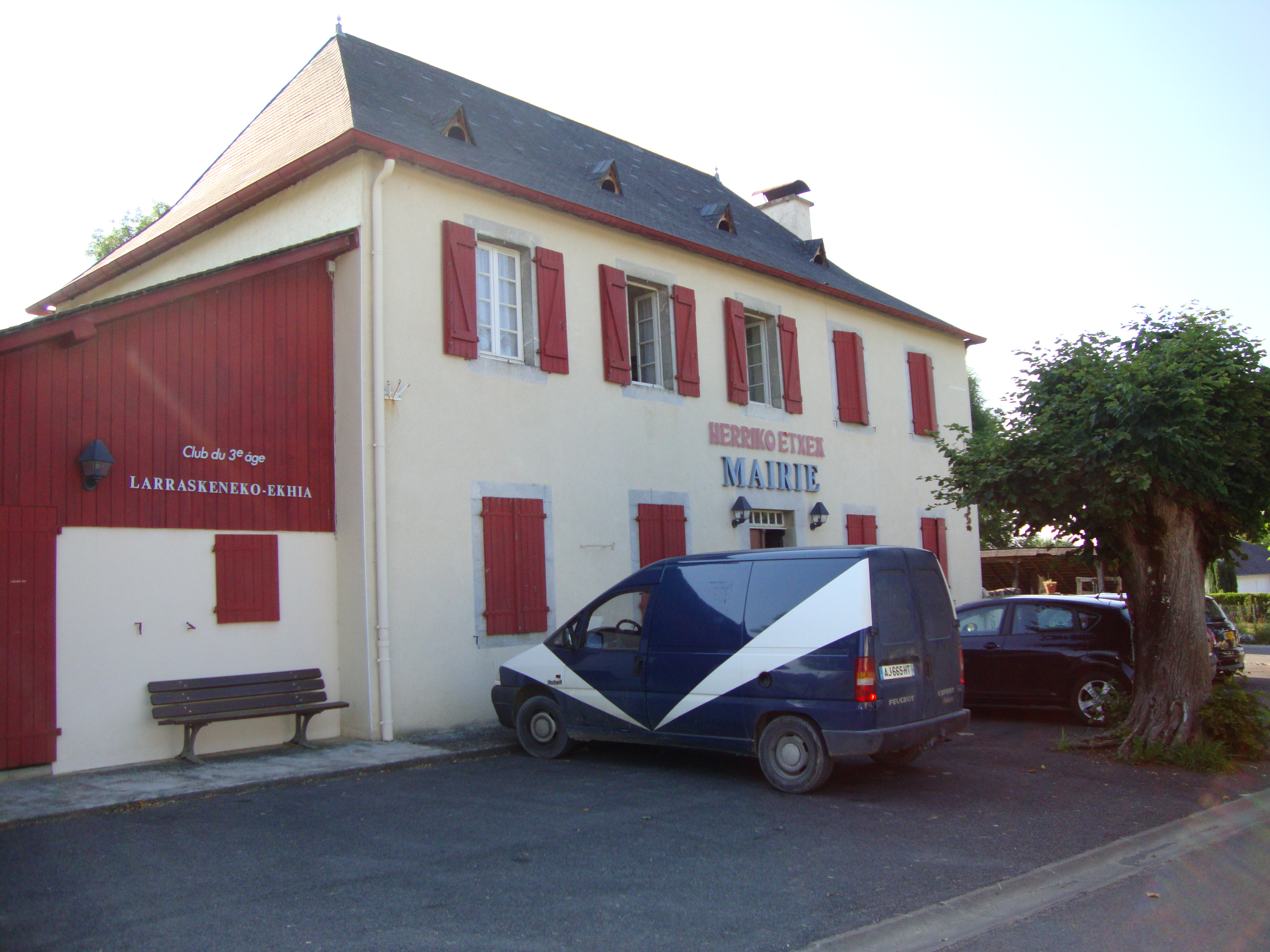
Town Hall at Alos

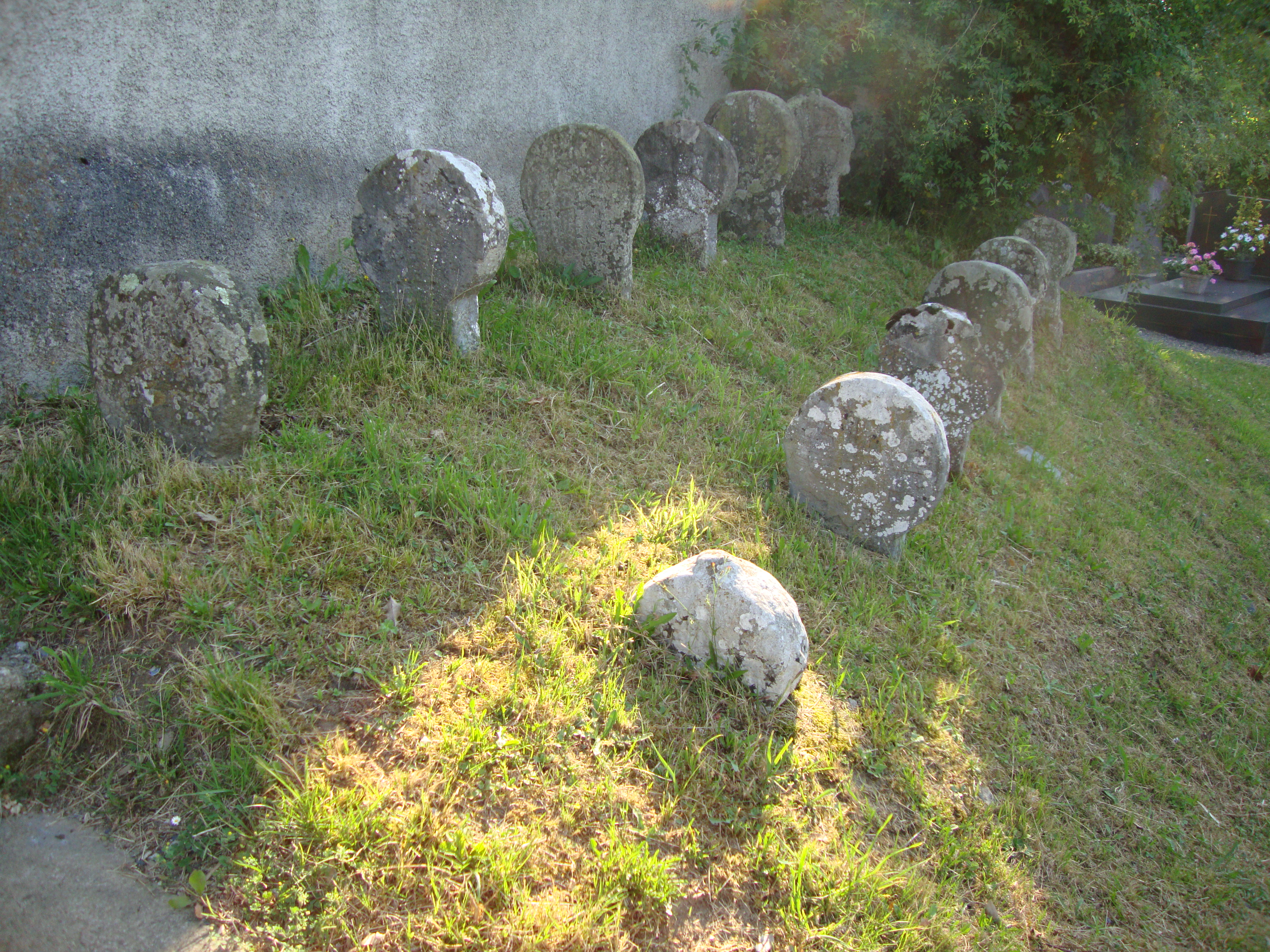
Old Hilarri at Alos

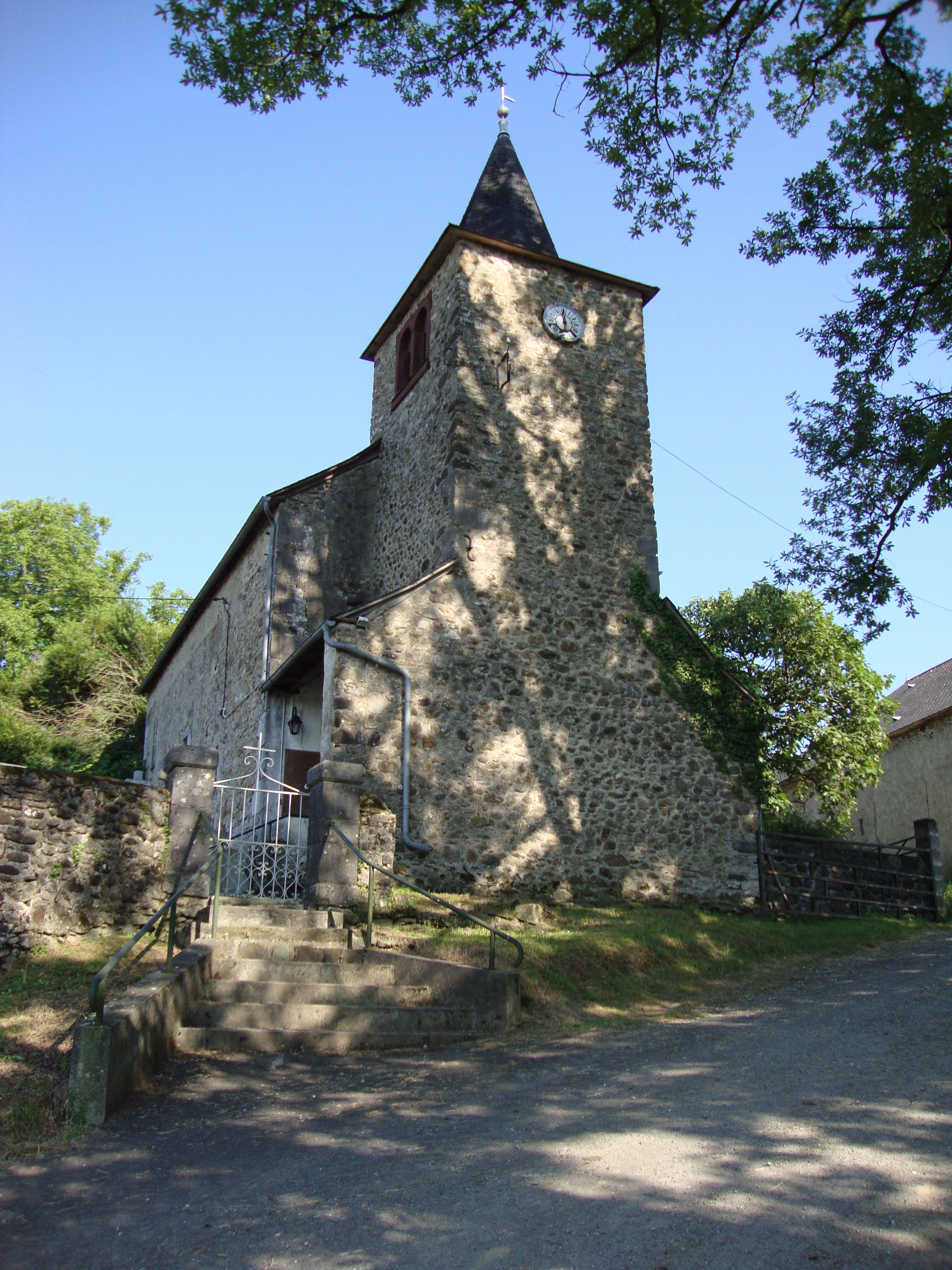
The Church of Sibas

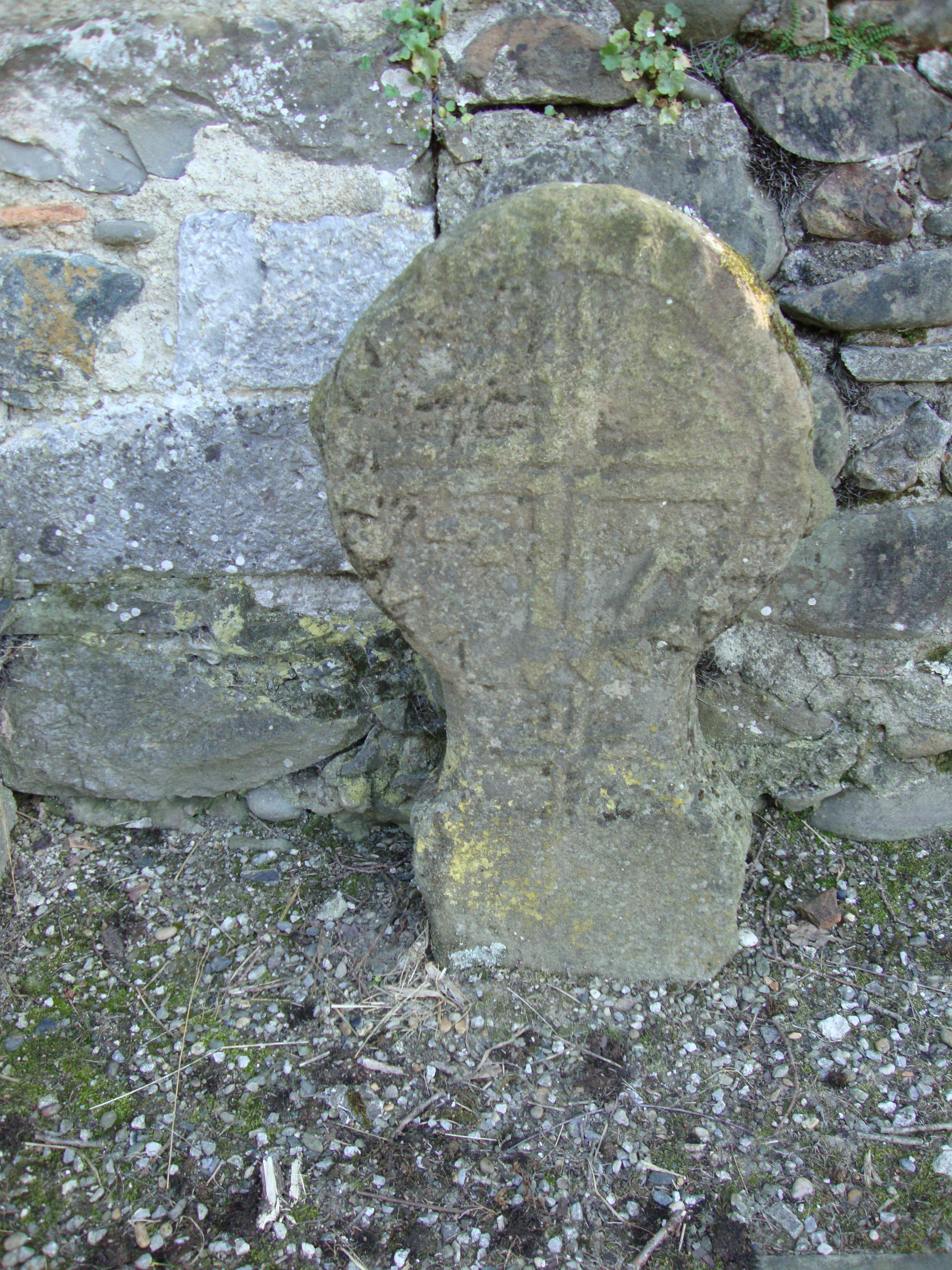
Old Hilarri at Sibas

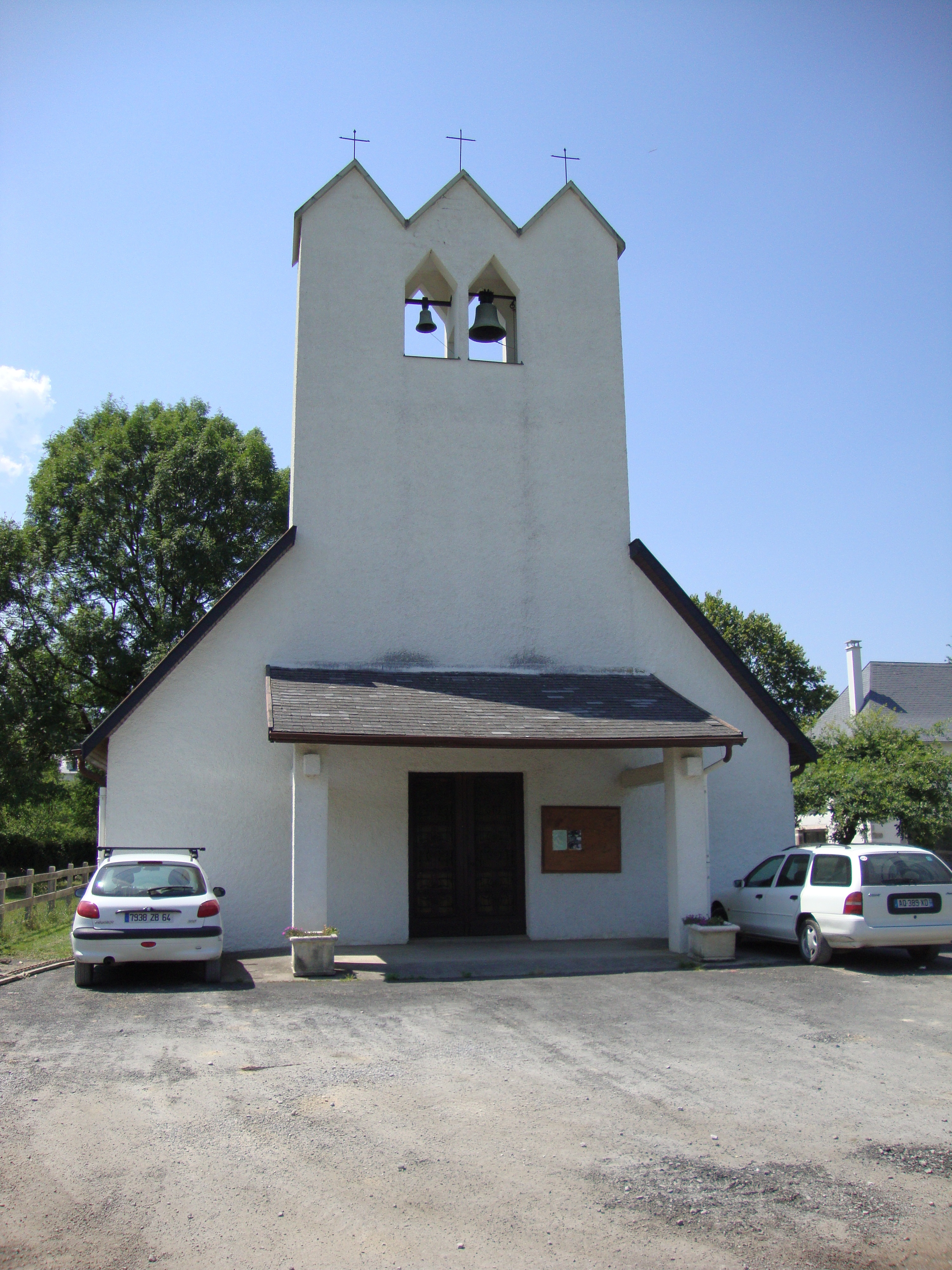
Trinity Bell Tower at the Church of Abense

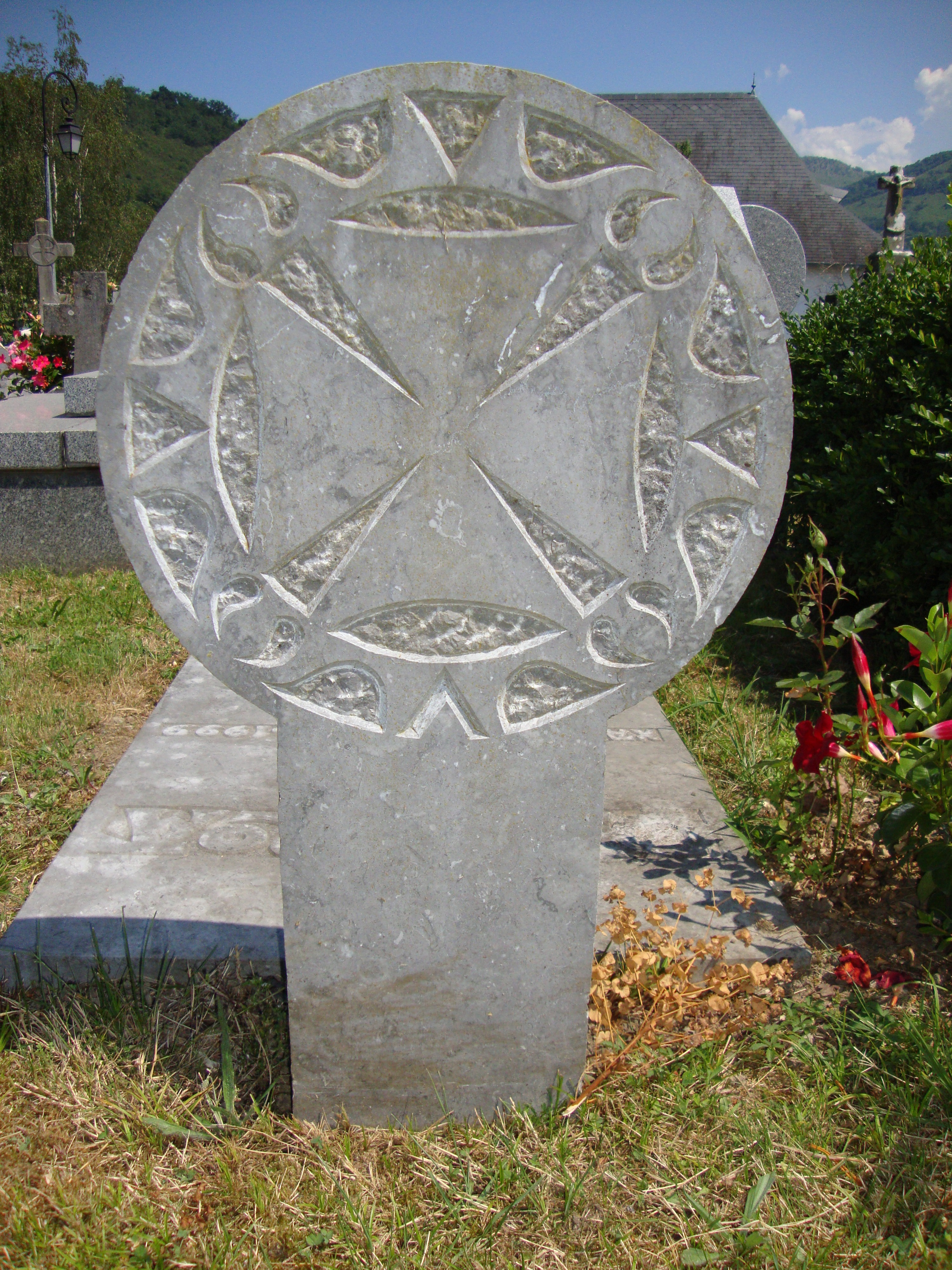
Hilarri at Abense

== History ==
Sibas merged with Alos on 23 October 1843 to form Alos-Sibas. On 16 April 1859, following the annexation of part of the territory of Abense-de-Haut, the commune took the name of Alos-Sibas-Abense.

On the same day the commune of Abense-de-Haut disappeared, its territory being divided between Alos-Sibas and Tardets.

=== Heraldry ===
Arms of Alos-Sibas-Abense	The motto of the commune is atzotik biharrera (from yesterday to tomorrow) Blazon: Or, a bridge of three arches argent masoned in sable over a party per fess barry wavy of 4 azure and argent and surmounted by a comma sun gules of eight arms all over a terrace in base of 3 pales; the first Or with a tower in sable turreted windows and door open; the second gules a plume argent in an inkpot sable; the third azure 3 commas argent inverted in chief.

== Administration ==
Lists of Successive Mayors of Alos-Sibas-Abense

=== Until 1843 ===
Alos

From	To	Name	Party	Position
1796	1798	Alexis Carriquert		
1798	1799	Pierre Queheille		
1799	1824	Jean Bastereche		
1824	1836	Jean d'Arthex		
1836	1845	Arnaud Sallabert		

Sibas

From	To	Name	Party	Position
1795	1798	Jean Carrique		
1798	1808	Philippe Etchart		
1808	1813	Jean Harritchague		
1813	1825	Jean Carrique		
1825	1832	Jean-Pierre d'Arthez-Lassalle		
1832	1845	Dominique Erbin called Etchecopar		

Abense-de-Haut

From	To	Name	Party	Position
1793	1795	André Etchart		
1795	1806	Jean Althabegoity called Oliberou		
1806	1810	Arnaud Irigonegaray		
1810	1816	Jean-Baptiste Detchandy		
1816	1824	Casimir Etchebarne		
1824	1848	Jean-Baptiste Detchandy		

=== Until 1859 ===
Alos-Sibas

From	To	Name	Party	Position
1845	1847	Arnaud Sallabert		
1847	1859	Jules Basterreche		

Abense-de-Haut

From	To	Name	Party	Position
1848	1848	André Etchart		
1848	1852	Jean Etchecopar dit Etchahoun		
1852	1859	Laurent Maytie		

=== After 1859 ===
Alos-Sibas-Abense

From	To	Name	Party	Position
1859	1871	Jules Basterreche		
1871	1875	Arnaud André d'Arthez Lassale		
1875	1881	Jules Basterreche		
1881	1888	Pierre Arainty		
1888	1896	Pierre Arrospidegaray		
1896	1900	Jean-Pierre Mendicouague		
1900	1904	Arnaud Ibar		
1904	1912	Arnaud Cocosteguy		
1912	1916	Bernard Larragneguy		
1916	1918	Bernard Mondot		
1918	1919	Bernard Larragneguy		
1919	1929	Jean Iriart		
1929	1939	Pierre Marmissole		
1939	1940	Joseph Etchart		
1940	1951	Pierre Marmissole		
1951	1953	Bernard Aguer		
1953	1971	Général Pierre Montjean		
1971	1983	Pierre Luchillo		
1983	2001	Pierre-Clémént Iratçabal		
2001	2008	Anne-Marie Etcheberry		
2008	2014	Jean-Pierre Iriart		

=== Intercommunality ===
The town is part of six intercommunal structures:

- the Communauté d'agglomération du Pays Basque
- the union to support Basque culture
- SIVOM of the canton of Tardets
- the municipal association for the gaves of Oloron and Mauleon
- SIVU for Tourism in Haute-Soule and Barétous
- the AEP Union for Soule country

== Demography ==
The population data given in the table and graph below for 1836 and earlier refer to the former commune of Alos, and for 1841-1851 to the former commune of Alos-Sibas. The inhabitants of the commune are known as Aloztar-Ziboztar-Oniztar.

Historical population

Year	Pop.	±% p.a.
1793	188	—
1800	212	+1.73%
1806	218	+0.47%
1821	213	−0.15%
1831	223	+0.46%
1836	223	+0.00%
1841	360	+10.05%
1846	354	−0.34%
1851	316	−2.25%
1856	646	+15.37%
1861	565	−2.64%
1866	505	−2.22%
1872	527	+0.71%
1876	523	−0.19%
1881	538	+0.57%
1886	530	−0.30%
1891	536	+0.23%
1896	511	−0.95%
1901	484	−1.08%

Year	Pop.	±% p.a.
1906	463	−0.88%
1911	453	−0.44%
1921	437	−0.36%
1926	421	−0.74%
1931	415	−0.29%
1936	414	−0.05%
1946	401	−0.32%
1954	352	−1.62%
1962	368	+0.56%
1968	343	−1.17%
1975	361	+0.73%
1982	316	−1.88%
1990	309	−0.28%
1999	319	+0.35%
2007	269	−2.11%
2012	303	+2.41%
2017	319	+1.03%
2023	291	−1.52%

Source: EHESS and INSEE

== Economy ==
Economic activity is mainly focused on agriculture (livestock and pasture). The town is part of the Appellation d'origine contrôlée zone of Ossau-iraty.

== Culture and heritage ==
=== Civil heritage ===
- Etchandia House, formerly owned by the Etchandy family.
- La Salle d'Abense

=== Religious heritage ===
The Church of Abense contains a Processional Cross (15th century) which is registered as an historical object.

=== Environmental heritage ===
The common practices Controlled burns for prevention of forest fires.

== Facilities ==
The town has an early childhood hub (Child care centre and a creche) and an Ikastola.

== See also ==
- Communes of the Pyrénées-Atlantiques department
