= Pettarra =

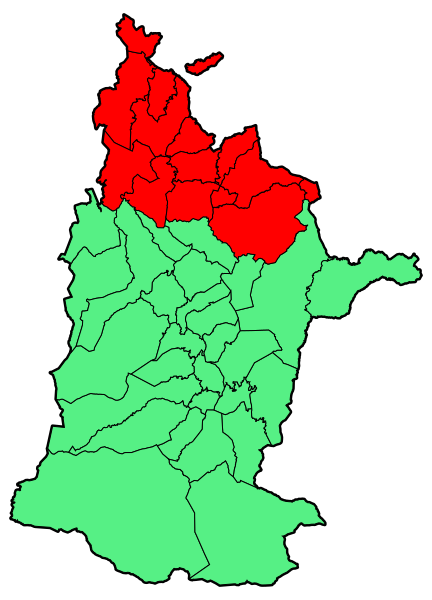
Petarra in Zuberoa

Pettarra (Basque, /petjara/, from beheretar(ra)* 'lowlander', French: Basse-Soule) was the vernacular name for the area along the lower course of the Saison (French Basque Country), as opposed to the Basabürüa.

It was also known as Barhoue.
