= Bec du Gave =

Coordinates: 43.54631°N 1.19476°W

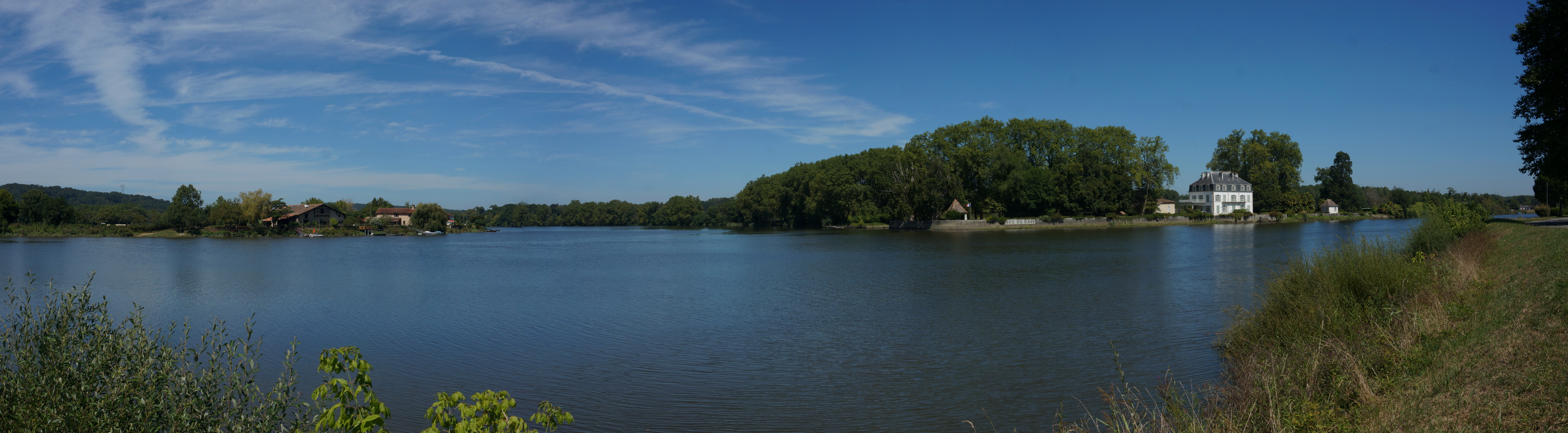

Bec du Gave is the point at which the Gaves réunis stream meets the Adour River in southwestern France. The Chateau du Bec du Gave is located nearby. Nearest village is Port-de-Lanne.
