= Camou-Cihigue =

Camou-Cihigue Gamere-Zihiga
- Commune
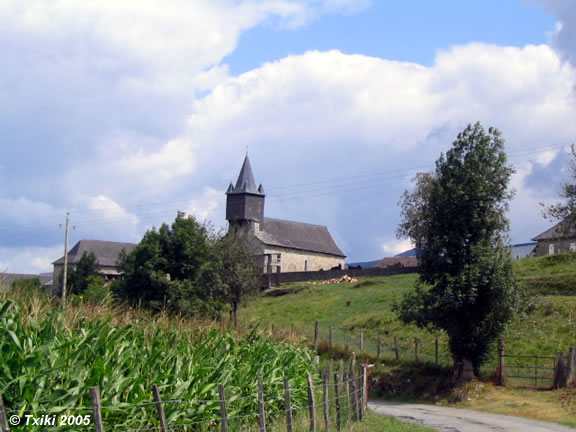
- Church of Cihigue
- Location of Camou-Cihigue
- Location within France Location within Nouvelle-Aquitaine
- Coordinates: 43°07′02″N 0°54′17″W
- Country: France
- Region: Nouvelle-Aquitaine
- Department: Pyrénées-Atlantiques
- Arrondissement: Oloron-Sainte-Marie
- Canton: Montagne Basque
- Intercommunality: CA Pays Basque

Government
  - Mayor (2020–2026): Charles Anicet Leurgorry
- Area^{1}: 10.08 km^{2} (3.89 sq mi)
- Elevation: 263 m (863 ft)
- Highest elevation: 1,009 m (3,310 ft)
- Lowest elevation: 208 m (682 ft)
- Population (2023): 107
  - Density: 10.6/km^{2} (27.5/sq mi)
- Time zone: UTC+01:00 (CET)
  - Summer (DST): UTC+02:00 (CEST)
- INSEE/Postal code: 64162 /64470
- ^{1} French Land Register data, which excludes lakes, ponds, glaciers > 1 km^{2} (0.386 sq mi or 247 acres) and river estuaries.

Camou-Cihigue (French pronunciation: [kamu si.iɡ]; Occitan: Camon e Cihiga; Basque: Gamere-Zihiga) is a commune in the Pyrénées-Atlantiques department in south-western France.

It is located in the former province of Soule.

== Geography ==
Neughboring communes:

- Ossas-Suhare, in the north
- Aussurucq, in the north-west
- Alos-Sibas-Abense, in the east
- Alçay-Alçabéhéty-Sunharette, in the south

== History ==
The commune of Camou-Cihigue was formed in 1836, from the merger of the former communes of Camou and Cihigue.

== See also ==
- Communes of the Pyrénées-Atlantiques department
