= Saison (river) =

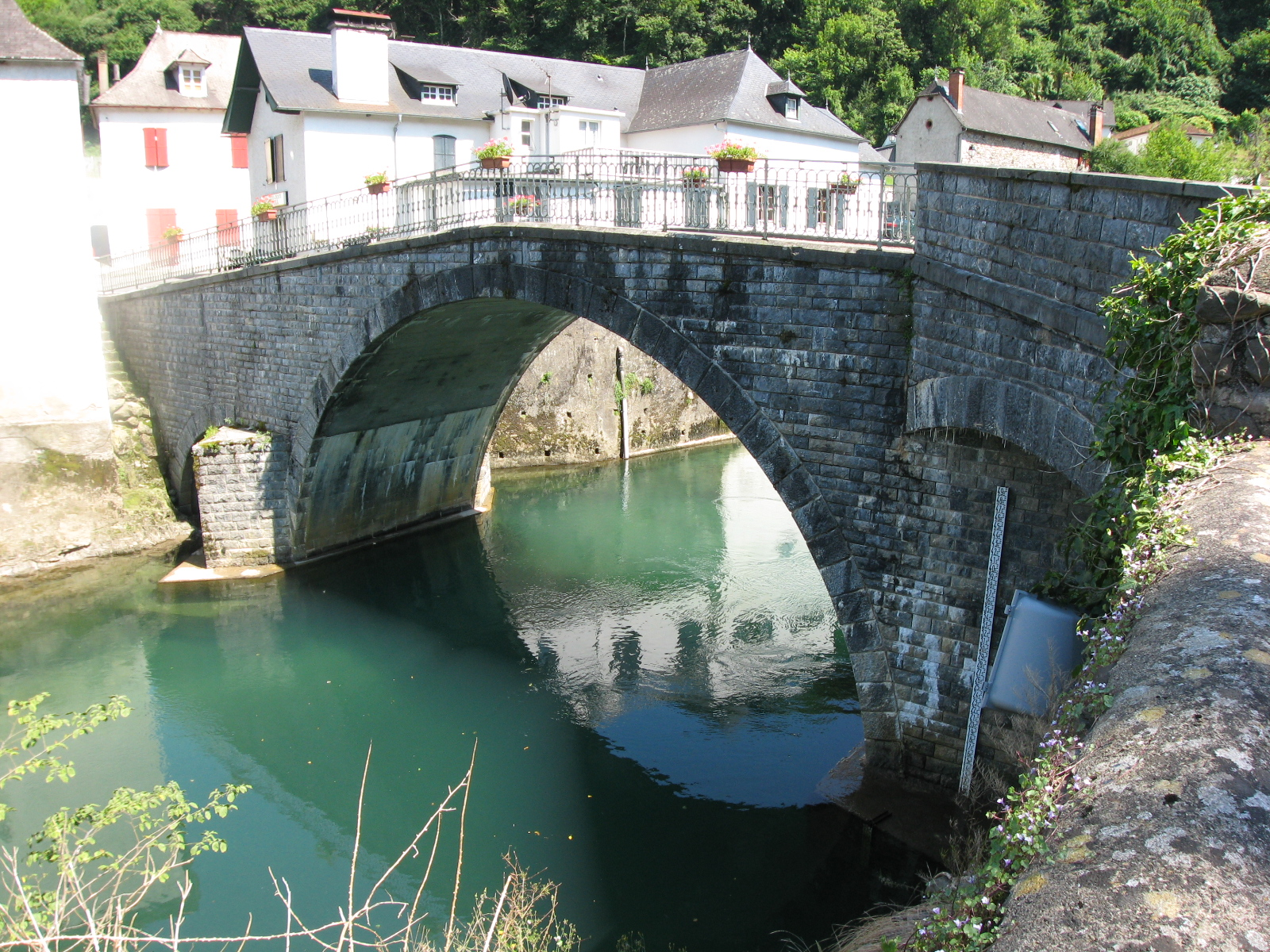

- Location within France Location within Nouvelle-Aquitaine

Location
- Country: France

Physical characteristics
- Source
  - location: Licq-Athérey
  - elevation: 288 m (945 ft)
- Mouth
  - location: Gave d'Oloron
  - coordinates: 43°24′8″N 0°58′27″W
- Length: 72 km (45 mi)
- Basin size: 627 km^{2} (242 mi^{2})

Basin features
- Progression: Gave d'Oloron→ Gaves réunis→ Adour→ Atlantic Ocean

The Saison (French pronunciation: [sɛzɔ̃]) or Uhaitz Handia is a left tributary of the Gave d'Oloron river in the French Basque Country, (Pyrénées-Atlantiques), southwest of France. Its general south to north direction provides the axis for the former French province of Soule. It is also known as the Gave de Mauléon. It is 72.2 km (44.9 mi) long, including its upper courses Zurkaitzegiko erreka and Gave de Larrau.

== Geography ==
The river is formed in Licq-Athérey from the confluence of the Gave de Sainte-Engrâce (from the Pierre-Saint-Martin Cave) and the Gave de Larrau (from the Pic d'Orhy).

It flows north and joins the Gave d'Oloron in Autevielle-Saint-Martin-Bideren, downstream from Sauveterre-de-Béarn.

== Départements and towns ==
The Saison flows completely within the Pyrénées-Atlantiques department. The riverside towns are Tardets-Sorholus and Mauléon-Licharre.

== Name ==
The vernacular name Uhaitz handia (or simply Uhaitza) is based on the common word uhaitz meaning "torrential river" in Euskara. It corresponds to the French word gave. -a is the article and handi means big.

The enigmatic gascon name Saison could be a contraction season with the former name Gaison, itself derived from the variant ugaitz of uhaitz.

Tributary names are also linguistically interesting, with two specific stems:

- Aphanize: name of tributaries from Montory (Aphanize) and from Haux (Aphanixe).
- Aphahura: leading to the following names: Aphaura (from Aroue and from Arrast, Aphura (from Alçay), Aphuhura (from Aussurucq).

The stem gezal, a derivate of basque gazi 'salty', applied to 'still water', is also represented.

== Main tributaries ==
- (R) Aphanixe (Appaniche), from Haux
- (L) Elgabarrena or Üthürrotxa, from Etchebar
- (R) Aphanize, from Montory
- (L) Aphura or Aphoura, from Alçay
- (L) Gezala / Guéçala, from Camou-Cihigue
- (L) Aphuhura (Aphouhoura) or Gezaleko erreka / Guéçalia, from Aussurucq
- (L) Arangorena, from Ordiarp
  - (L) Abarrakia, from Musculdy
- (R) Aphaura, from Arrast-Larrebieu,
- (L) Barlako erreka or Aphaura, from Aroue,
- (L) Héourqué, from Lohitzun-Oyhercq
  - (L) Xuhukoa, from Domezain
