= Licq-Athérey =

Licq-Athérey Ligi-Atherei
- Commune
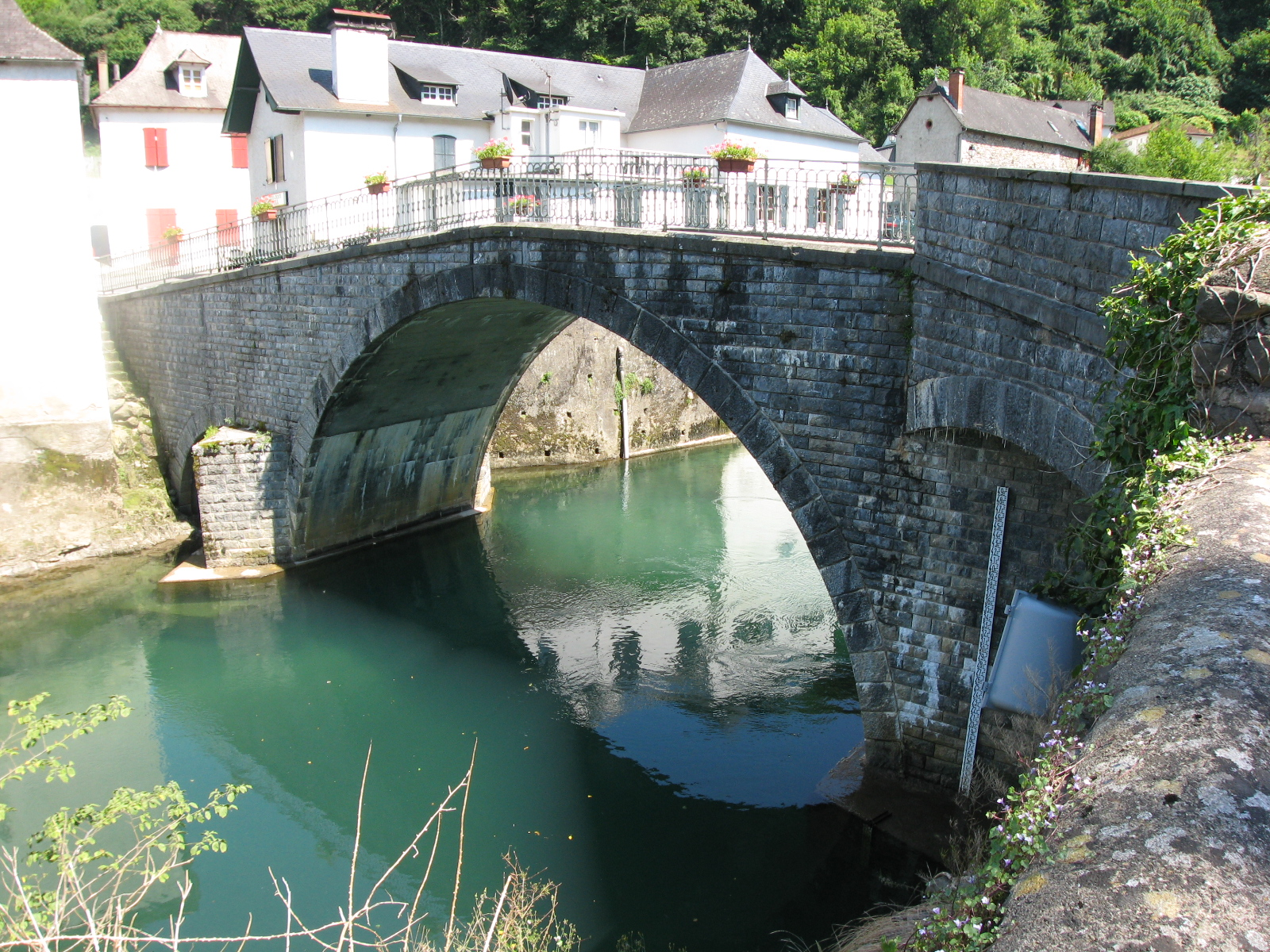
- Bridge on the river Saison
- Location of Licq-Athérey
- Location within France Location within Nouvelle-Aquitaine
- Coordinates: 43°04′05″N 0°52′32″W
- Country: France
- Region: Nouvelle-Aquitaine
- Department: Pyrénées-Atlantiques
- Arrondissement: Oloron-Sainte-Marie
- Canton: Montagne Basque
- Intercommunality: CA Pays Basque

Government
  - Mayor (2020–2026): Pierre Quihillalt
- Area^{1}: 17.87 km^{2} (6.90 sq mi)
- Elevation: 497 m (1,631 ft)
- Highest elevation: 1,097 m (3,599 ft)
- Lowest elevation: 242 m (794 ft)
- Population (2023): 194
  - Density: 10.9/km^{2} (28.1/sq mi)
- Time zone: UTC+01:00 (CET)
  - Summer (DST): UTC+02:00 (CEST)
- INSEE/Postal code: 64342 /64560
- ^{1} French Land Register data, which excludes lakes, ponds, glaciers > 1 km^{2} (0.386 sq mi or 247 acres) and river estuaries.

Licq-Athérey (French pronunciation: [lik ateʁɛj]; Occitan: Atèri; Basque: Ligi-Atherei) is a commune in the Pyrénées-Atlantiques department in south-western France.

It is located in the former province of Soule.

== Sights ==
Licq has a church (Church of St. Julien) whose origins date back to the Middle Ages and was substantially revised in the nineteenth century.

== See also ==
- Communes of the Pyrénées-Atlantiques department
