= Sainte-Engrâce =

Sainte-Engrâce Urdatx-Santa-Grazi (Basque)
- Commune
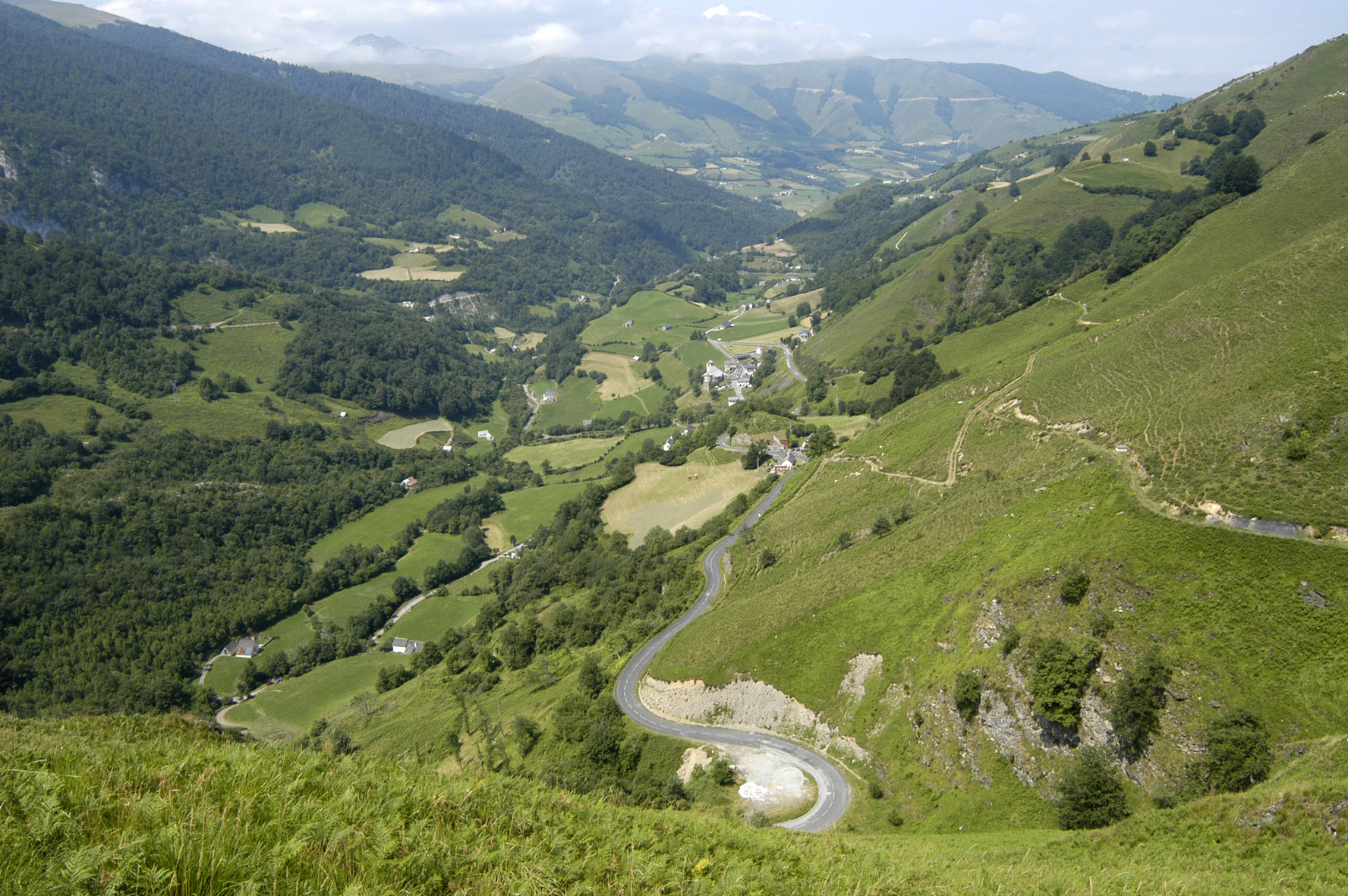
- View of Sainte-Engrâce in the Uhaitxa Valley
- Location of Sainte-Engrâce
- Location within France Location within Nouvelle-Aquitaine
- Coordinates: 43°00′54″N 0°51′10″W
- Country: France
- Region: Nouvelle-Aquitaine
- Department: Pyrénées-Atlantiques
- Arrondissement: Oloron-Sainte-Marie
- Canton: Montagne Basque
- Intercommunality: CA Pays Basque

Government
  - Mayor (2020–2026): Maryse Othart
- Area^{1}: 72.69 km^{2} (28.07 sq mi)
- Elevation: 650 m (2,130 ft)
- Highest elevation: 1,881 m (6,171 ft)
- Lowest elevation: 300 m (980 ft)
- Population (2023): 169
  - Density: 2.32/km^{2} (6.02/sq mi)
- Time zone: UTC+01:00 (CET)
  - Summer (DST): UTC+02:00 (CEST)
- INSEE/Postal code: 64475 /64560
- ^{1} French Land Register data, which excludes lakes, ponds, glaciers > 1 km^{2} (0.386 sq mi or 247 acres) and river estuaries.

Sainte-Engrâce (French pronunciation: [sɛ̃t ɑ̃ɡʁas]; Occitan: Senta Engràcia; Basque: Urdatx-Santa-Grazi) is a commune in the Pyrénées-Atlantiques department in south-western France. It is located in the Northern Basque Country in the former province of Soule.

== See also ==
- Communes of the Pyrénées-Atlantiques department
