= Peyrehorade =

- Commune
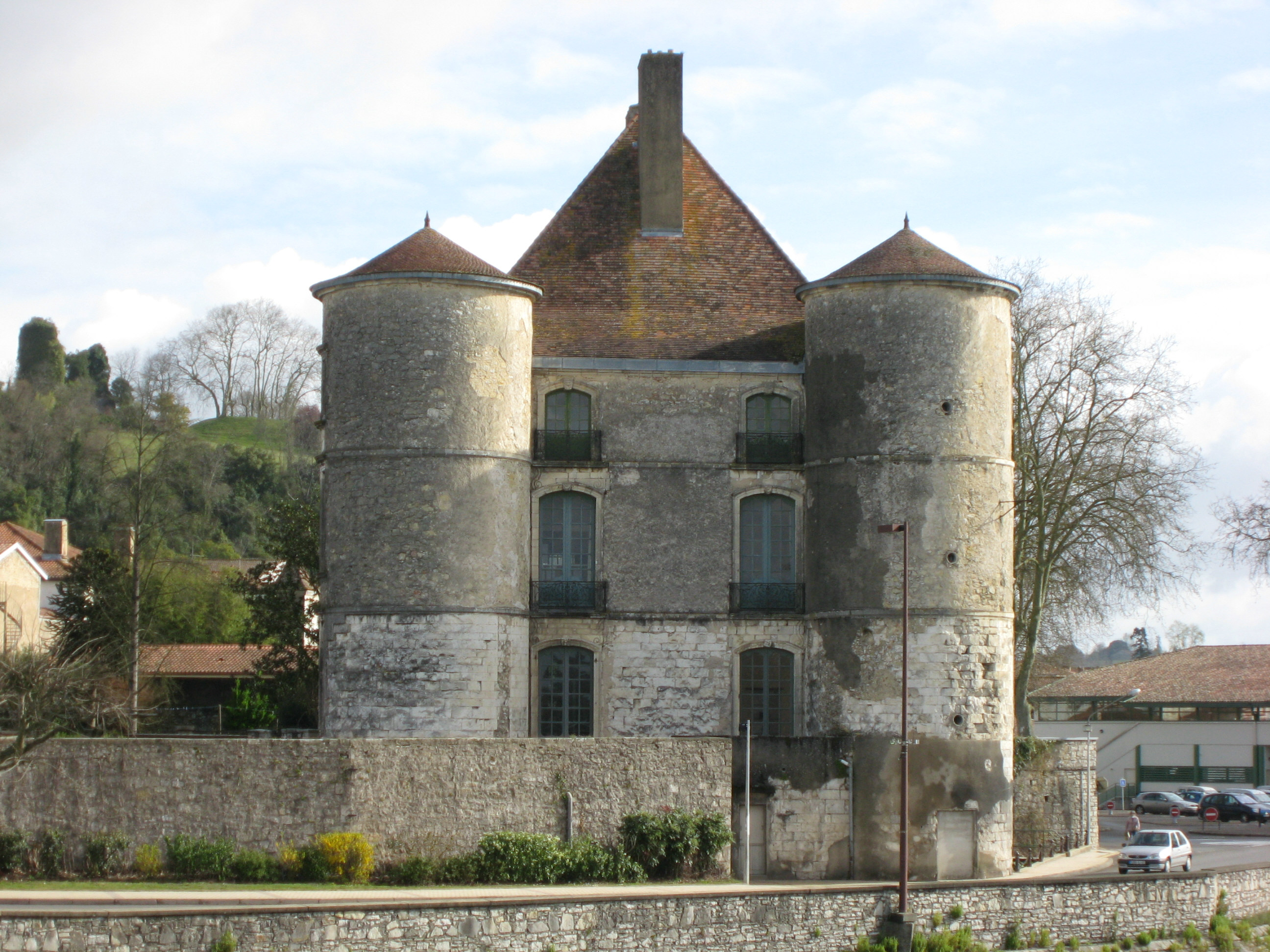
- Château de Montréal

- Coat of arms
- Location of Peyrehorade
- Location within France Location within Nouvelle-Aquitaine
- Coordinates: 43°32′46″N 1°05′49″W
- Country: France
- Region: Nouvelle-Aquitaine
- Department: Landes
- Arrondissement: Dax
- Canton: Orthe et Arrigans

Government
  - Mayor (2020–2026): Didier Sakellarides
- Area^{1}: 16.11 km^{2} (6.22 sq mi)
- Elevation: 19 m (62 ft)
- Highest elevation: 140 m (460 ft)
- Lowest elevation: 2 m (6.6 ft)
- Population (2023): 3,700
  - Density: 230/km^{2} (590/sq mi)
- Time zone: UTC+01:00 (CET)
  - Summer (DST): UTC+02:00 (CEST)
- INSEE/Postal code: 40224 /40300
- ^{1} French Land Register data, which excludes lakes, ponds, glaciers > 1 km^{2} (0.386 sq mi or 247 acres) and river estuaries.

Peyrehorade (French pronunciation: [pɛjʁəoʁad]; Occitan: Pèirahorada) is a commune in the Landes department in Nouvelle-Aquitaine in southwestern France. Peyrehorade station has rail connections to Bayonne, Pau and Tarbes.

== Population ==
Historical population

Year	Pop.	±% p.a.
1793	1,940	—
1821	2,103	+0.29%
1846	2,630	+0.90%
1872	2,503	−0.19%
1901	2,597	+0.13%
1926	2,377	−0.35%
1946	2,181	−0.43%
1962	2,584	+1.07%
1968	2,591	+0.05%

Year	Pop.	±% p.a.
1975	2,861	+1.43%
1982	3,093	+1.12%
1990	3,056	−0.15%
1999	3,017	−0.14%
2007	3,477	+1.79%
2012	3,613	+0.77%
2017	3,695	+0.45%
2023	3,700	+0.02%

Source: EHESS and INSEE (1968-2023)

== See also ==
- Communes of the Landes department
