= Tardets-Sorholus =

Tardets-Sorholus Atharratze-Sorholüze (Basque)
- Commune
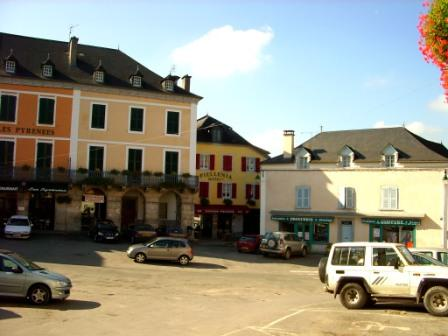
- The central square of the village

- Coat of arms
- Location of Tardets-Sorholus
- Location within France Location within Nouvelle-Aquitaine
- Coordinates: 43°07′03″N 0°51′41″W
- Country: France
- Region: Nouvelle-Aquitaine
- Department: Pyrénées-Atlantiques
- Arrondissement: Oloron-Sainte-Marie
- Canton: Montagne Basque
- Intercommunality: CA Pays Basque

Government
  - Mayor (2020–2026): Maïté Pitrau
- Area^{1}: 14.99 km^{2} (5.79 sq mi)
- Elevation: 298 m (978 ft)
- Highest elevation: 793 m (2,602 ft)
- Lowest elevation: 209 m (686 ft)
- Population (2023): 589
  - Density: 39.3/km^{2} (102/sq mi)
- Demonym(s): atharraztar, sorholüztar (Basque)
- Time zone: UTC+01:00 (CET)
  - Summer (DST): UTC+02:00 (CEST)
- INSEE/Postal code: 64533 /64470
- ^{1} French Land Register data, which excludes lakes, ponds, glaciers > 1 km^{2} (0.386 sq mi or 247 acres) and river estuaries.

Tardets-Sorholus (French pronunciation: [taʁdɛts sɔʁɔlys]; Occitan: Alhorses-Sorholús; Basque: Atharratze-Sorholüze) is a commune in the Pyrénées-Atlantiques department in south-western France.

It is located in the former province of Soule.

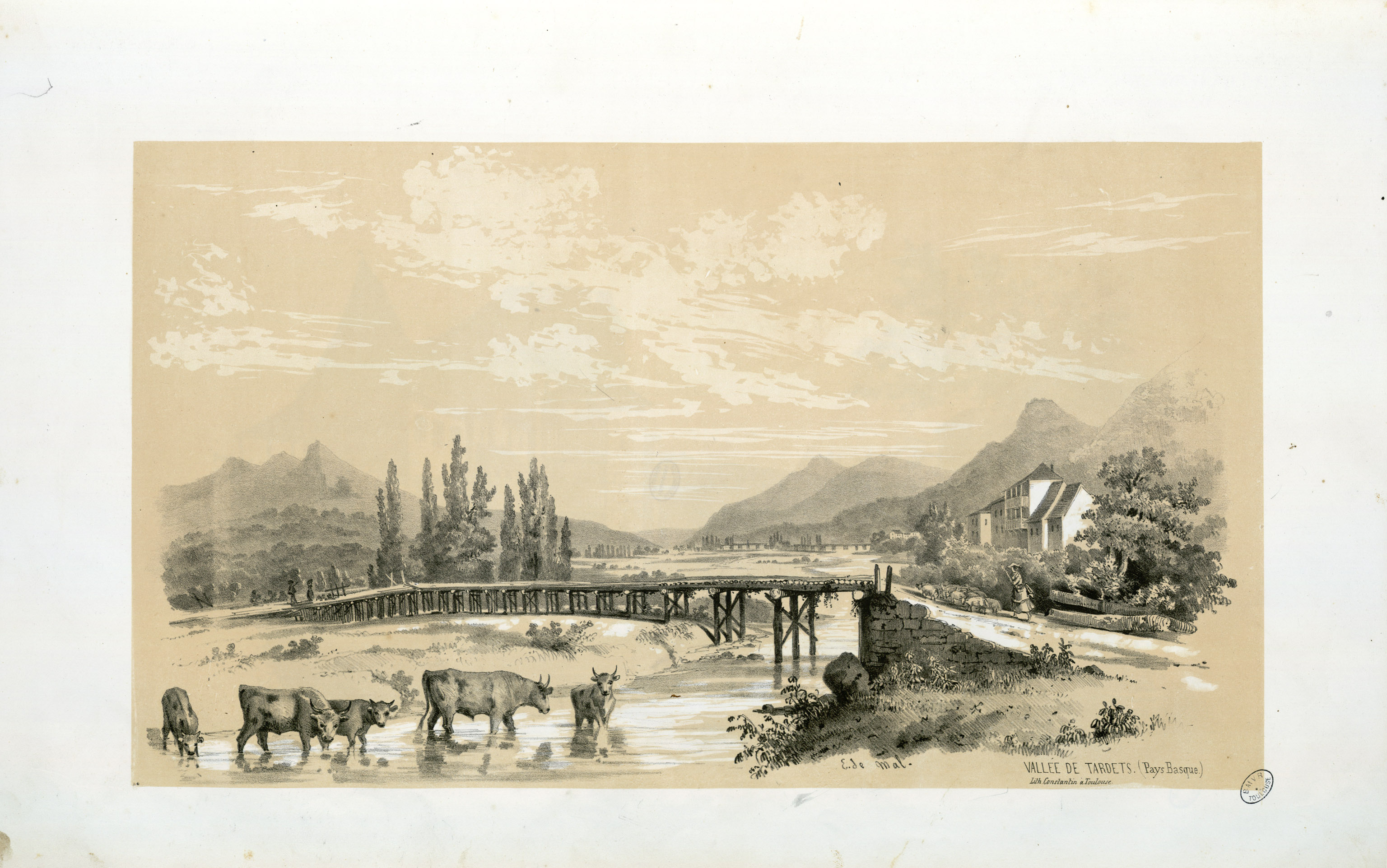
Tardets Valley in 1843 by Eugène de Malbos.

== See also ==
- Haute-Soule forest railway
- Communes of the Pyrénées-Atlantiques department
