= Pic d'Orhy =

Mountain in Spain and France

Orhy Orhi
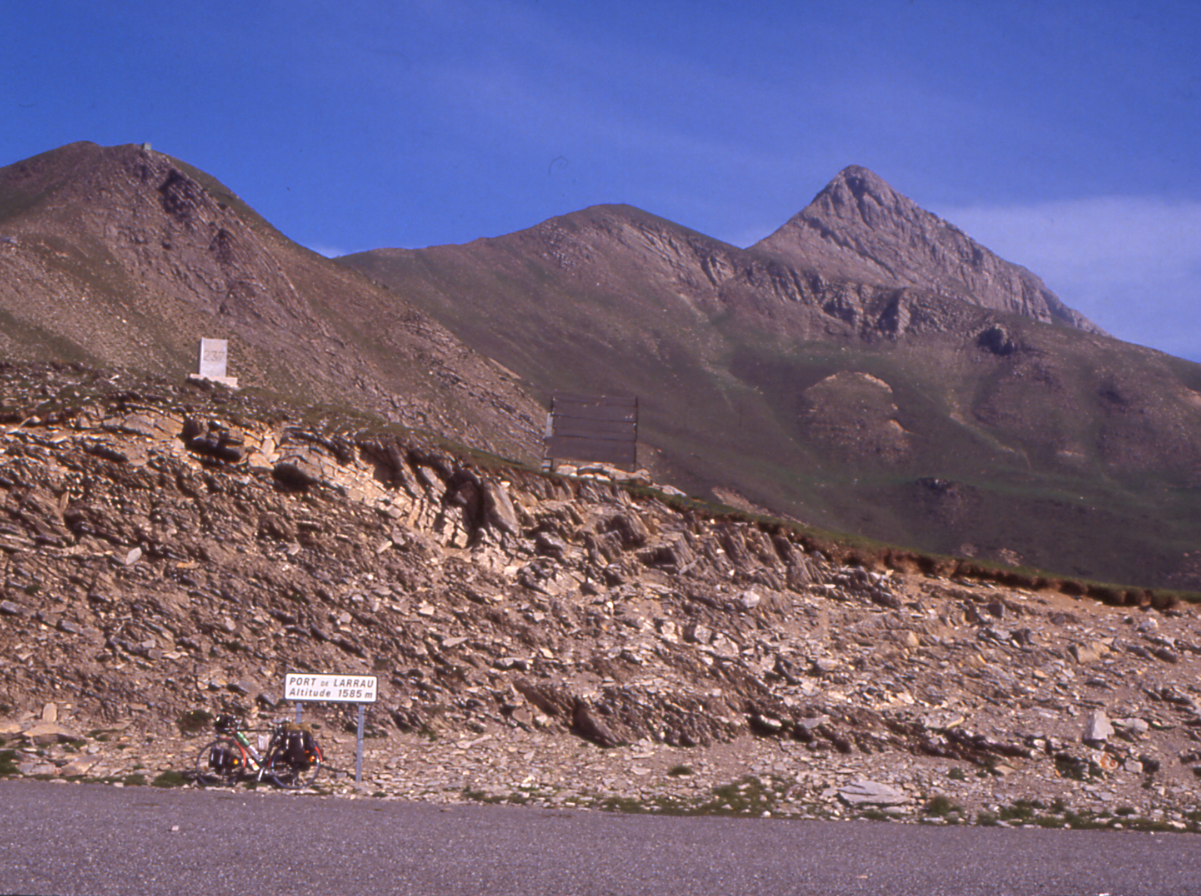
- Pic d'Orhy from Larrau pass.

Highest point
- Elevation: 2,017 m (6,617 ft)
- Prominence: 603 m (1,978 ft)
- Coordinates: 42°59′22.66″N 1°00′17.83″W

Naming
- Language of name: Basque

Geography
- Location within Pyrenees
- Location: Pyrénées-Atlantiques, France; Navarre, Spain
- Parent range: Pyrenees

Climbing
- Easiest route: Larrau pass

Mount Orhy (French), (Orhi in Basque), is a mountain at the border of Navarre (Spanish Basque Country) and Soule (French Basque Country), in the western Pyrenees, and is 2,017 metres (6,617 ft) high. It is the westernmost peak above 2,000 metres (6,562 ft) in the entire range, and the tallest mountain of the province of Soule. Its grassy slopes are used as pastures.

The name Orhy originates from Basque orre, meaning Juniper.

A prominent mountain next to the Irati Forest, it is very important in Basque mythology. Mention of "Orhiko xoria", or "Orhiko txoria" in standard Basque, (Basque: "bird of Orhi") is often found in many traditional Basque proverbs, poems, bertsos and songs, often to emphasize one's ties to their land: "Orhiko xoria, Orhin laket." (Souletin Basque: The bird of Orhi in Ohri will remain).
