= Gave d'Oloron =

River in southwestern France

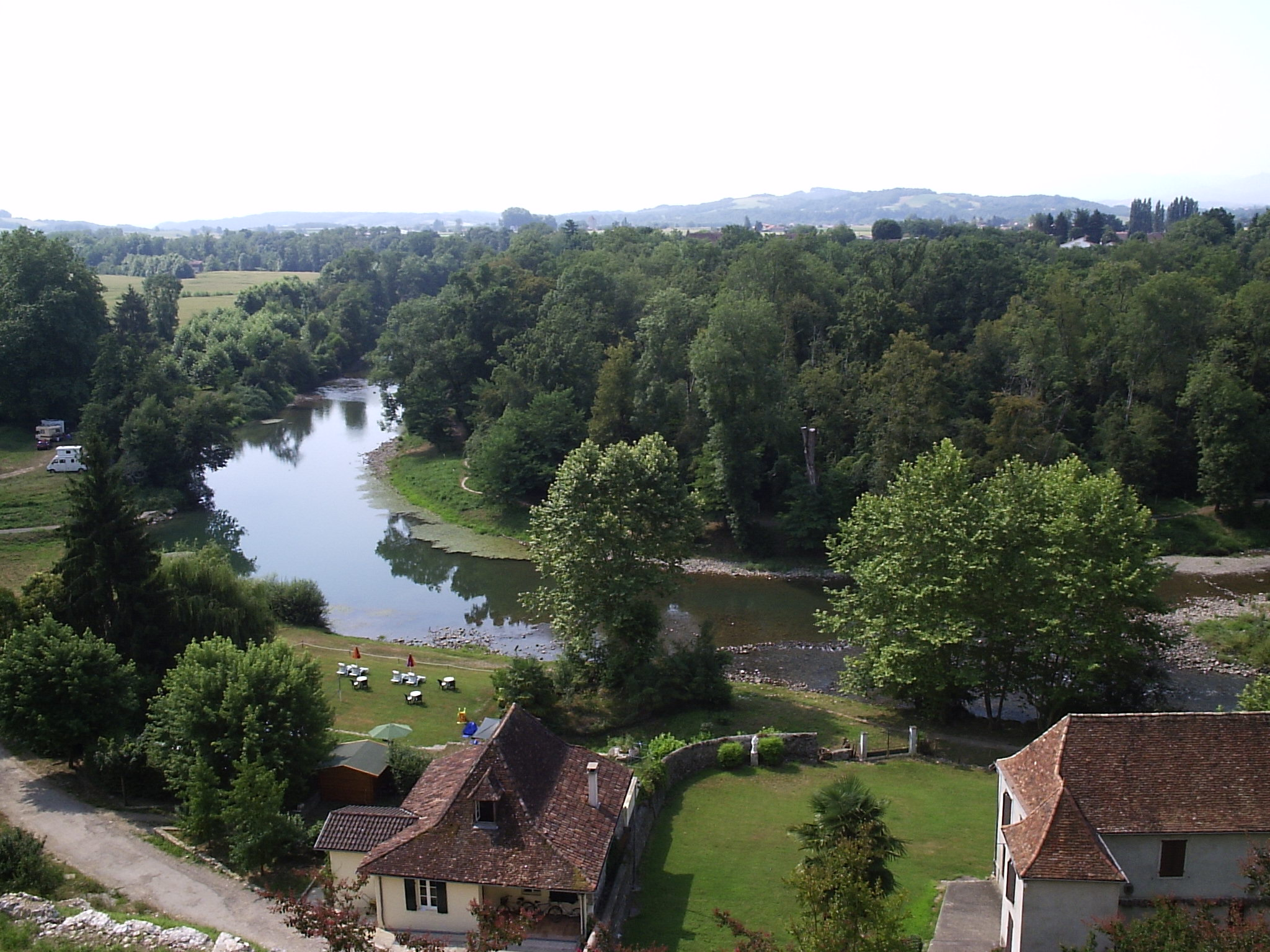
- The Gave d'Oloron in Sauveterre-de-Béarn

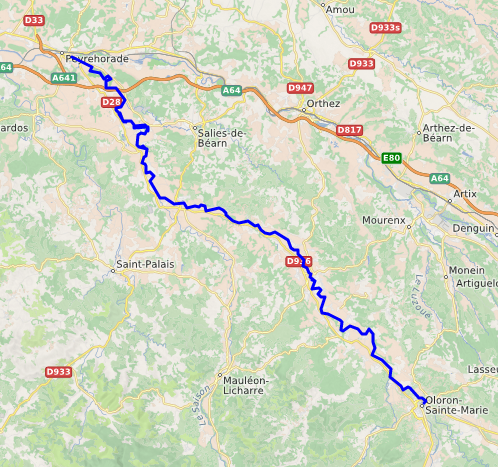

Location
- Country: France

Physical characteristics
- Source
  - location: Pyrenees
- Mouth
  - location: Gave de Pau
  - coordinates: 43°32′24″N 1°5′24″W
- Length: 148.8 km (92.5 mi)
- Basin size: 2,456 km^{2} (948 sq mi)
- Discharge
  - average: 102 m^{3}/s (3,600 cu ft/s)

Basin features
- Progression: Gaves réunis→ Adour→ Atlantic Ocean
- Tributaries
  - left: Vert, Saison

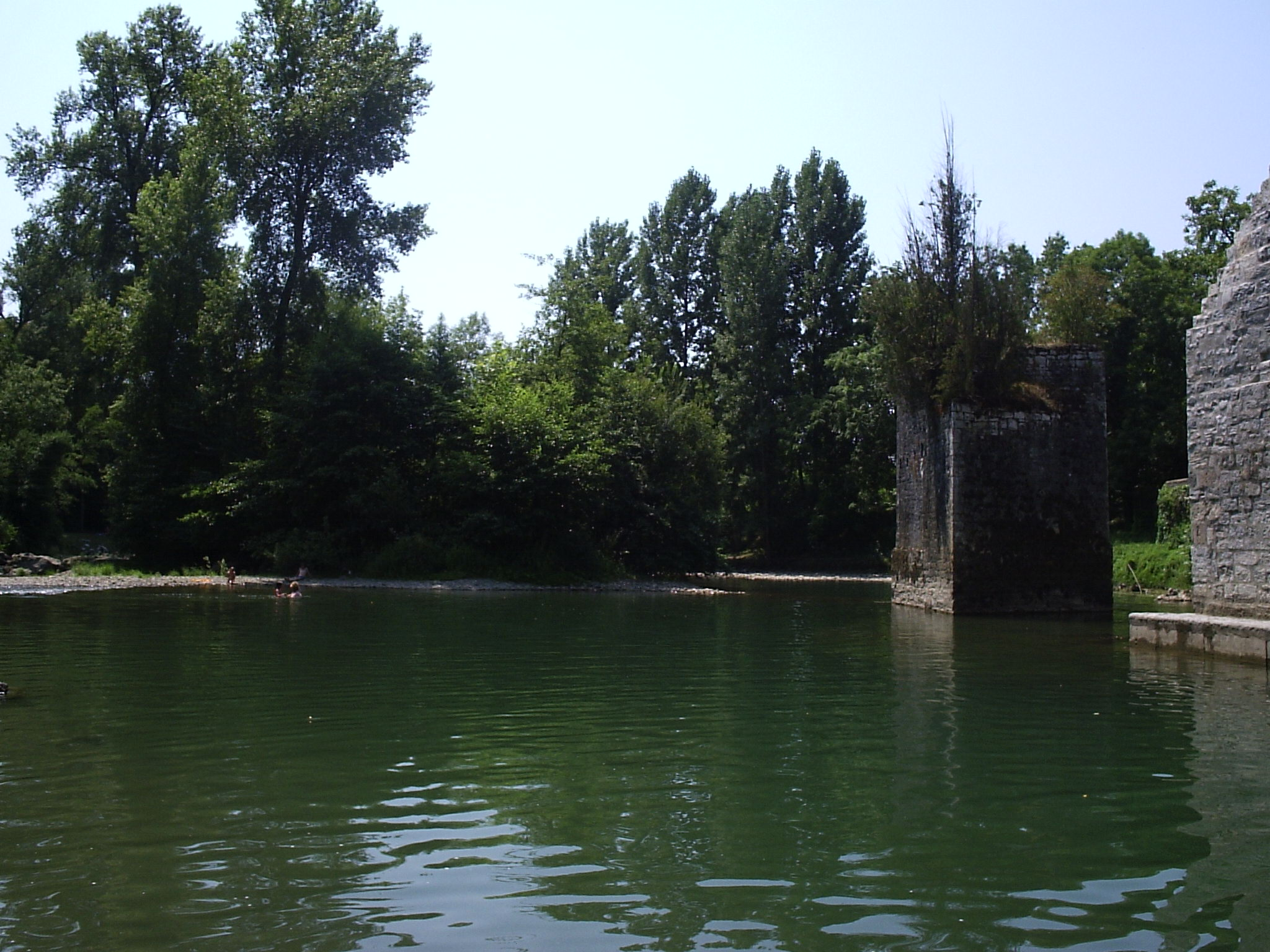
The Gave d'Oloron

The Oloron Gave (French: gave d'Oloron, [ɡav dɔlɔʁɔ̃]; Occitan: Gave d'Auloron) is a river of south-western France near the border with Spain. It takes its name from the city Oloron-Sainte-Marie, where it is formed from the rivers Gave d'Aspe and Gave d'Ossau. It joins the Gave de Pau in Peyrehorade to form the Gaves réunis, a tributary of the Adour. The Gave d'Oloron is used for fishing. The river is 148 kilometres (92 mi) long, including its source rivers Gave d'Ossau and Gave du Brousset. Near Sauveterre-de-Béarn it takes up its largest tributary, the Saison.

The Gave d'Oloron flows through the following départements and towns:

- Pyrénées-Atlantiques: Oloron-Sainte-Marie, Sauveterre-de-Béarn.
- Landes: Peyrehorade.
