= Gaves réunis =

River in southwestern France

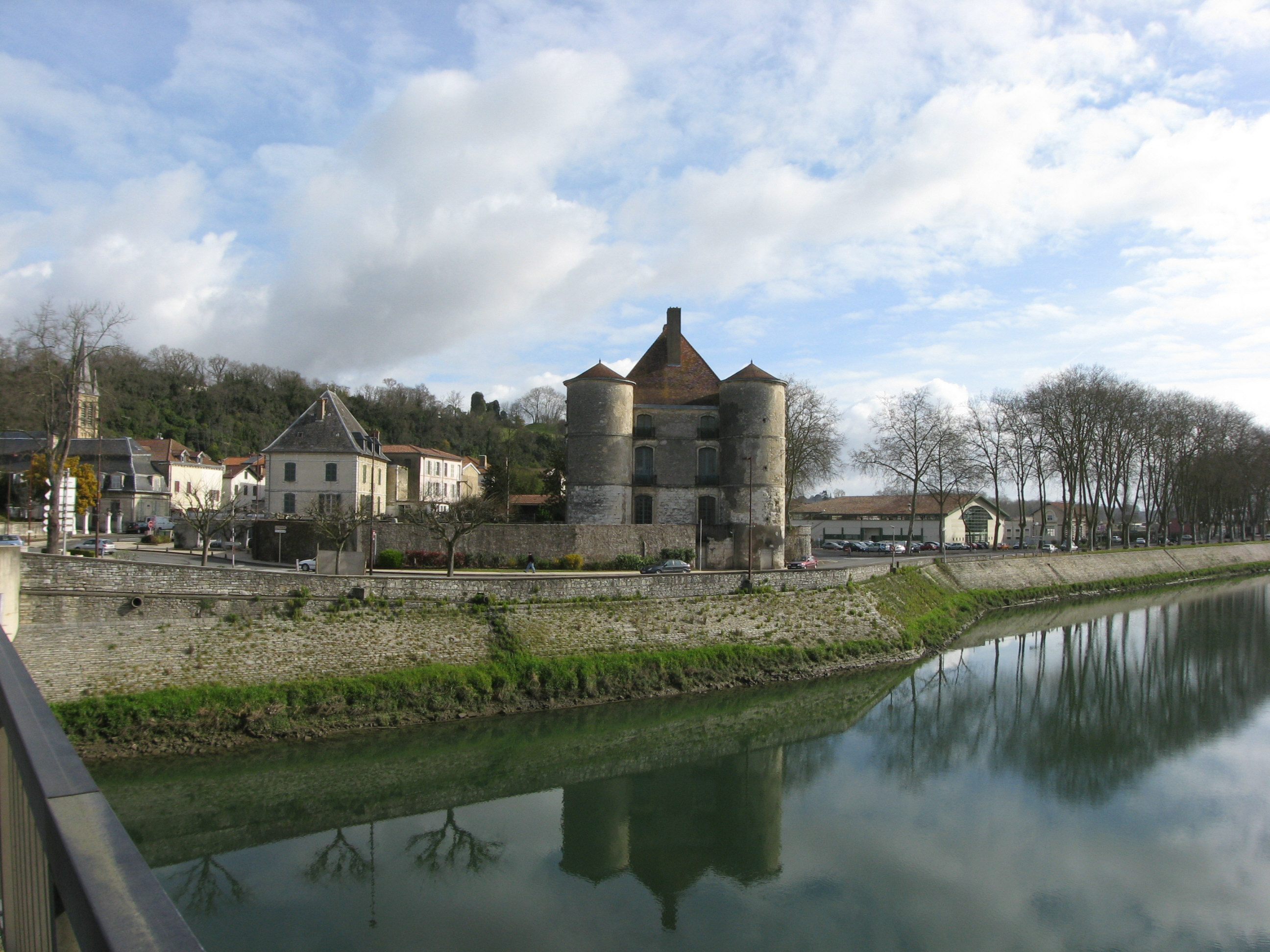

- Location within France Location within Nouvelle-Aquitaine

Location
- Country: France

Physical characteristics
- Source
  - location: Peyrehorade
- Mouth
  - location: Adour
  - coordinates: 43°32′46″N 1°11′41″W
- Length: 9.4 km (5.8 mi)
- Basin size: 5,200 km^{2} (2,000 sq mi)
- Discharge
  - average: 188 m^{3}/s (6,600 cu ft/s)

Basin features
- Progression: Adour→ Atlantic Ocean

The Gaves réunis (French pronunciation: [ɡav ʁeyni]) is a 9.4 km river in southwestern France connecting Peyrehorade to the Adour at Bec du Gave. It is formed by the confluence of the Gave de Pau and the Gave d'Oloron. It is navigable for 8 km from the confluence with the Adour until the town Peyrehorade.

== See also ==
- List of rivers of France
