= Larrau =

Larrau Larraine
- Commune
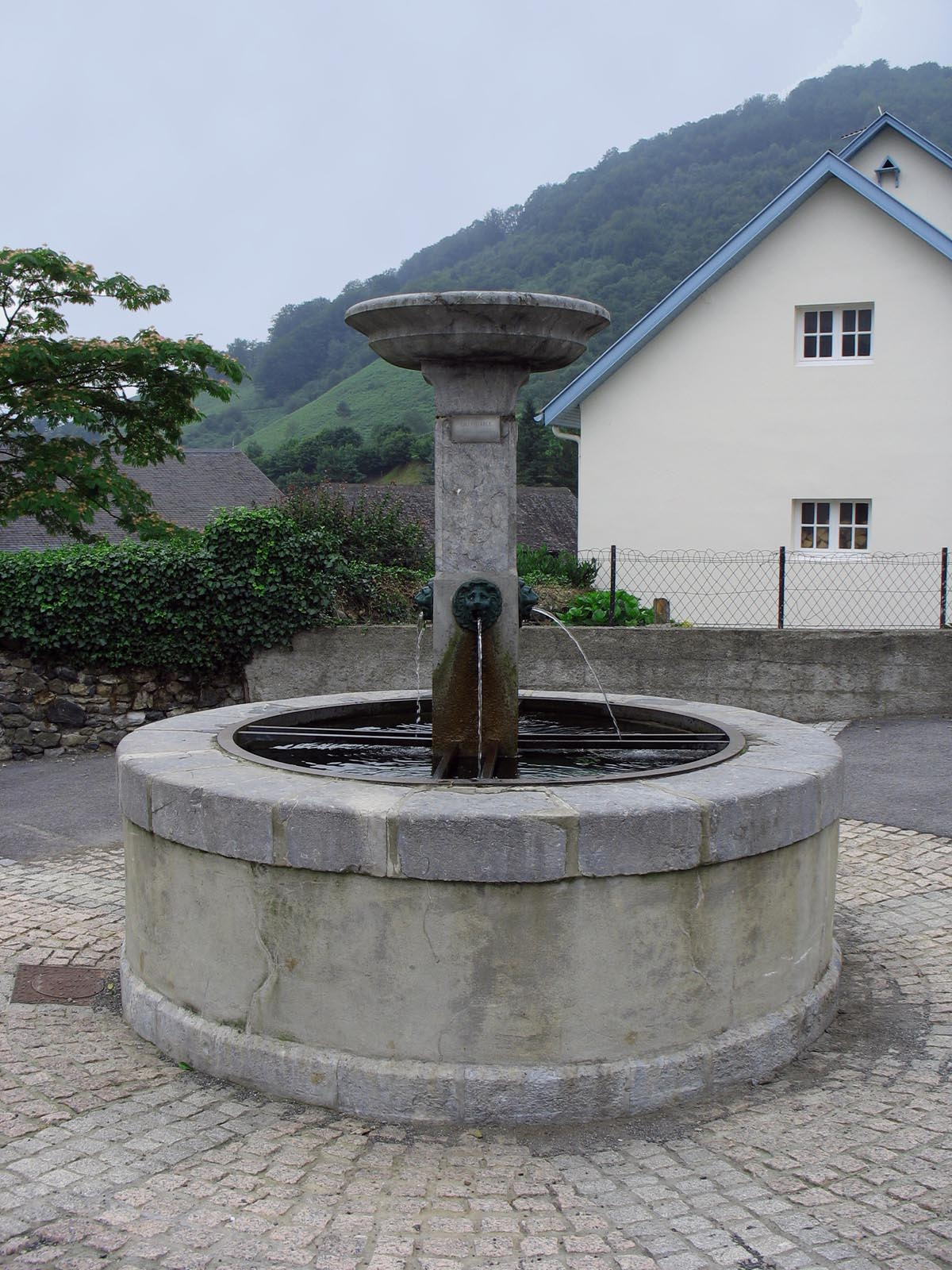
- The village fountain of Larrau

- Coat of arms
- Location of Larrau
- Location within France Location within Nouvelle-Aquitaine
- Coordinates: 43°01′11″N 0°57′16″W
- Country: France
- Region: Nouvelle-Aquitaine
- Department: Pyrénées-Atlantiques
- Arrondissement: Oloron-Sainte-Marie
- Canton: Montagne Basque
- Intercommunality: CA Pays Basque

Government
  - Mayor (2020–2026): Jean-Dominique Iriart
- Area^{1}: 126.80 km^{2} (48.96 sq mi)
- Elevation: 506 m (1,660 ft)
- Highest elevation: 2,022 m (6,634 ft)
- Lowest elevation: 319 m (1,047 ft)
- Population (2023): 179
  - Density: 1.41/km^{2} (3.66/sq mi)
- Time zone: UTC+01:00 (CET)
  - Summer (DST): UTC+02:00 (CEST)
- INSEE/Postal code: 64316 /64560
- ^{1} French Land Register data, which excludes lakes, ponds, glaciers > 1 km^{2} (0.386 sq mi or 247 acres) and river estuaries.

Larrau (French pronunciation: [laʁo]; Basque: Larraine) is a commune in the Pyrénées-Atlantiques department in south-western France.

It is located in the former province of Soule.

== See also ==
- Communes of the Pyrénées-Atlantiques department
