= Anoye =

- Commune
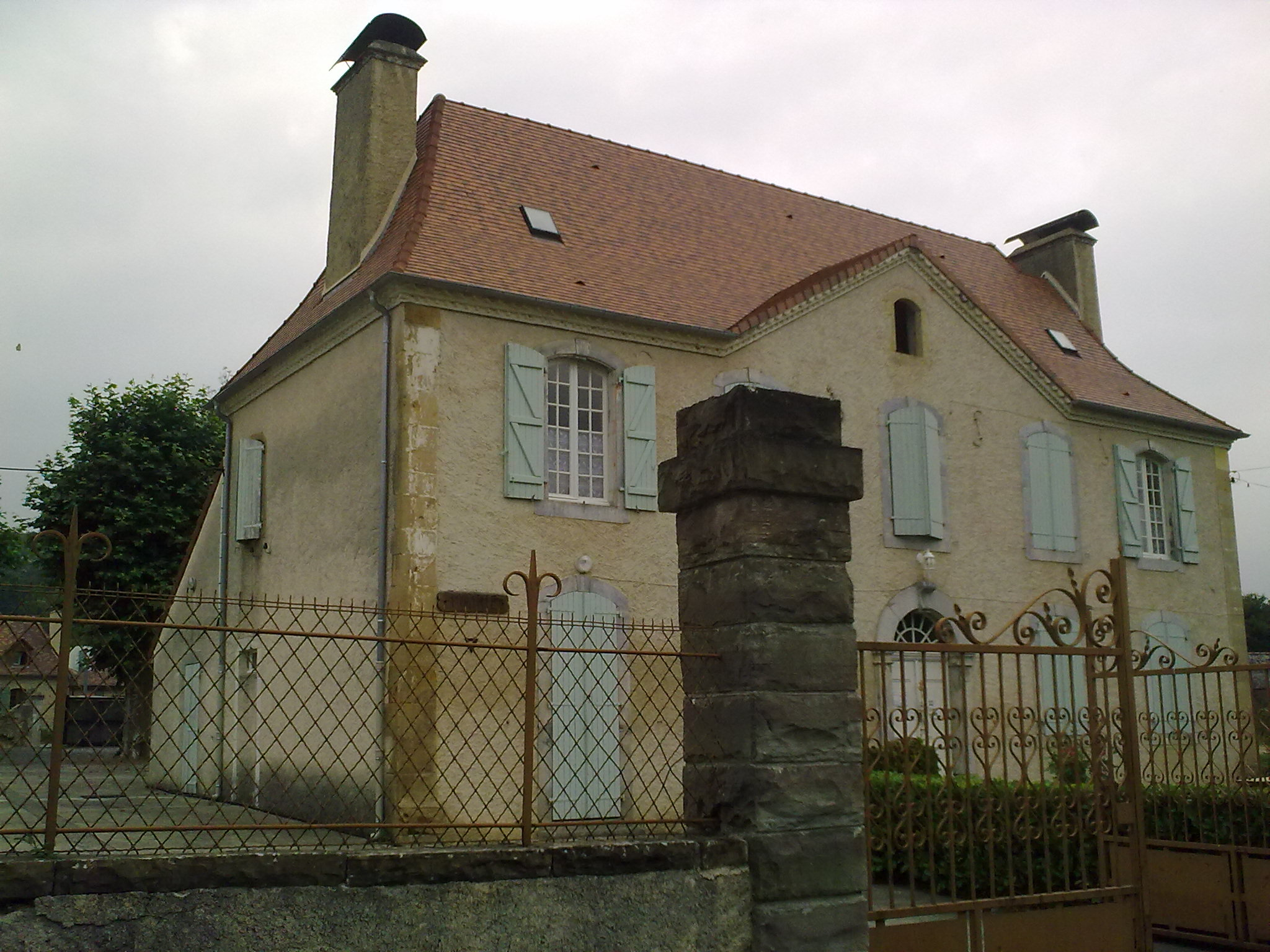
- Town hall
- Location of Anoye
- Location within France Location within Nouvelle-Aquitaine
- Coordinates: 43°23′44″N 0°08′11″W
- Country: France
- Region: Nouvelle-Aquitaine
- Department: Pyrénées-Atlantiques
- Arrondissement: Pau
- Canton: Terres des Luys et Coteaux du Vic-Bilh
- Intercommunality: Nord Est Béarn

Government
  - Mayor (2020–2026): Alain Lavoye
- Area^{1}: 9.65 km^{2} (3.73 sq mi)
- Elevation: 275 m (902 ft)
- Highest elevation: 344 m (1,129 ft)
- Lowest elevation: 199 m (653 ft)
- Population (2023): 140
  - Density: 15/km^{2} (38/sq mi)
- Time zone: UTC+01:00 (CET)
  - Summer (DST): UTC+02:00 (CEST)
- INSEE/Postal code: 64028 /64350
- ^{1} French Land Register data, which excludes lakes, ponds, glaciers > 1 km^{2} (0.386 sq mi or 247 acres) and river estuaries.

Anoye (French pronunciation: [anɔj]; Occitan: Anoja) is a commune in the Pyrénées-Atlantiques department in the Nouvelle-Aquitaine region of southwestern France. It is part of the urban area (aire d'attraction des villes) of Pau.

== Geography ==
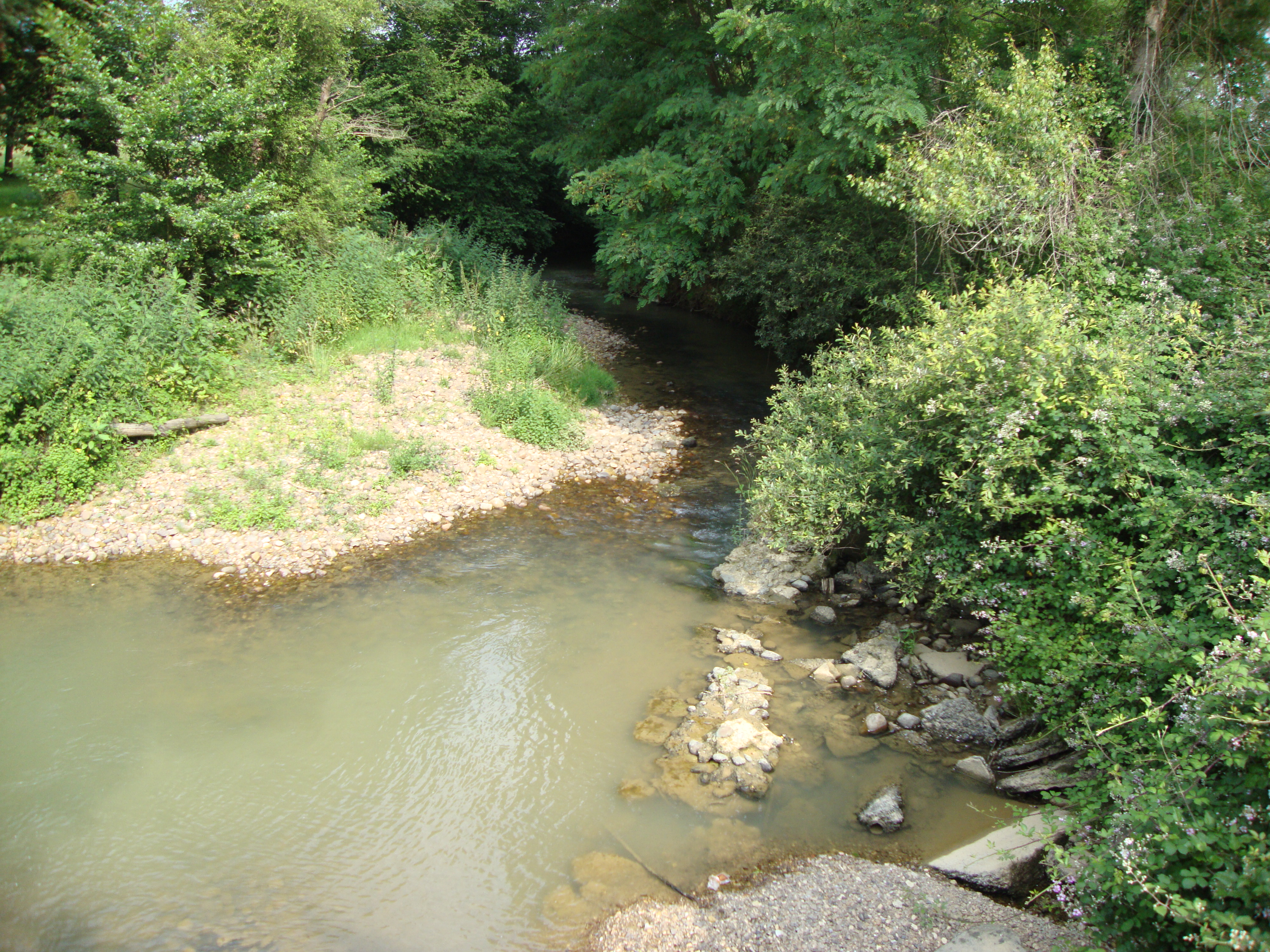
The Léez River

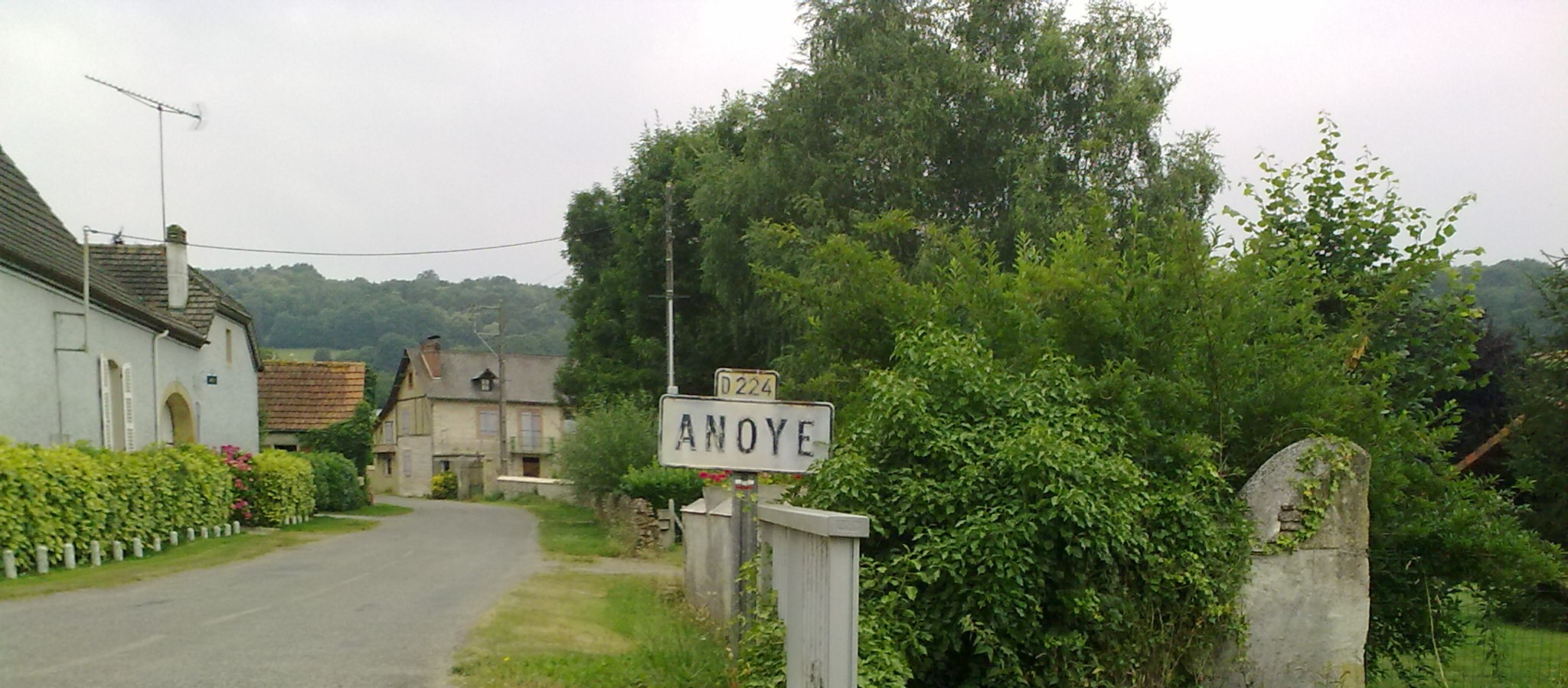
Entry to Anoye.

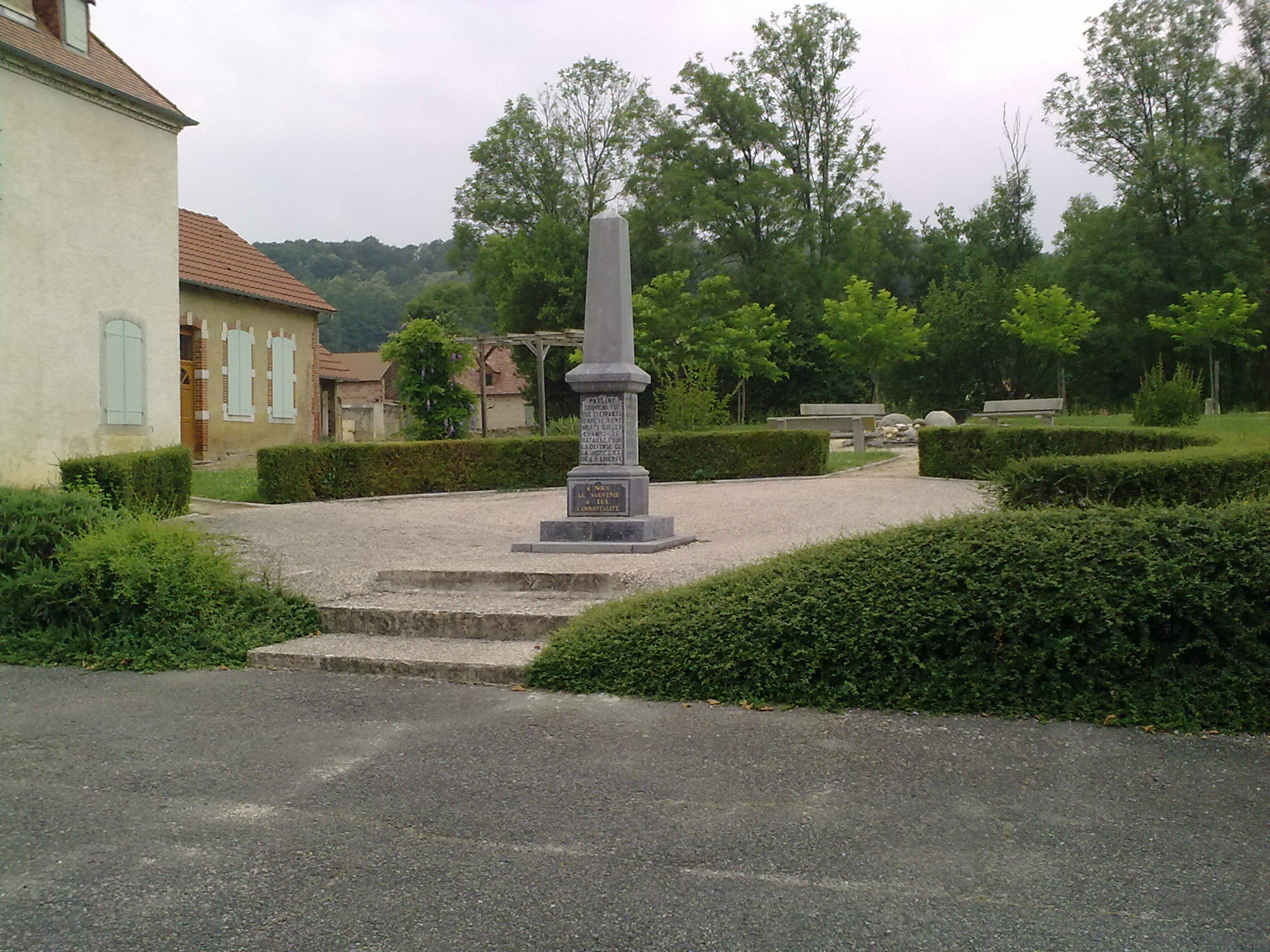
The War Memorial.

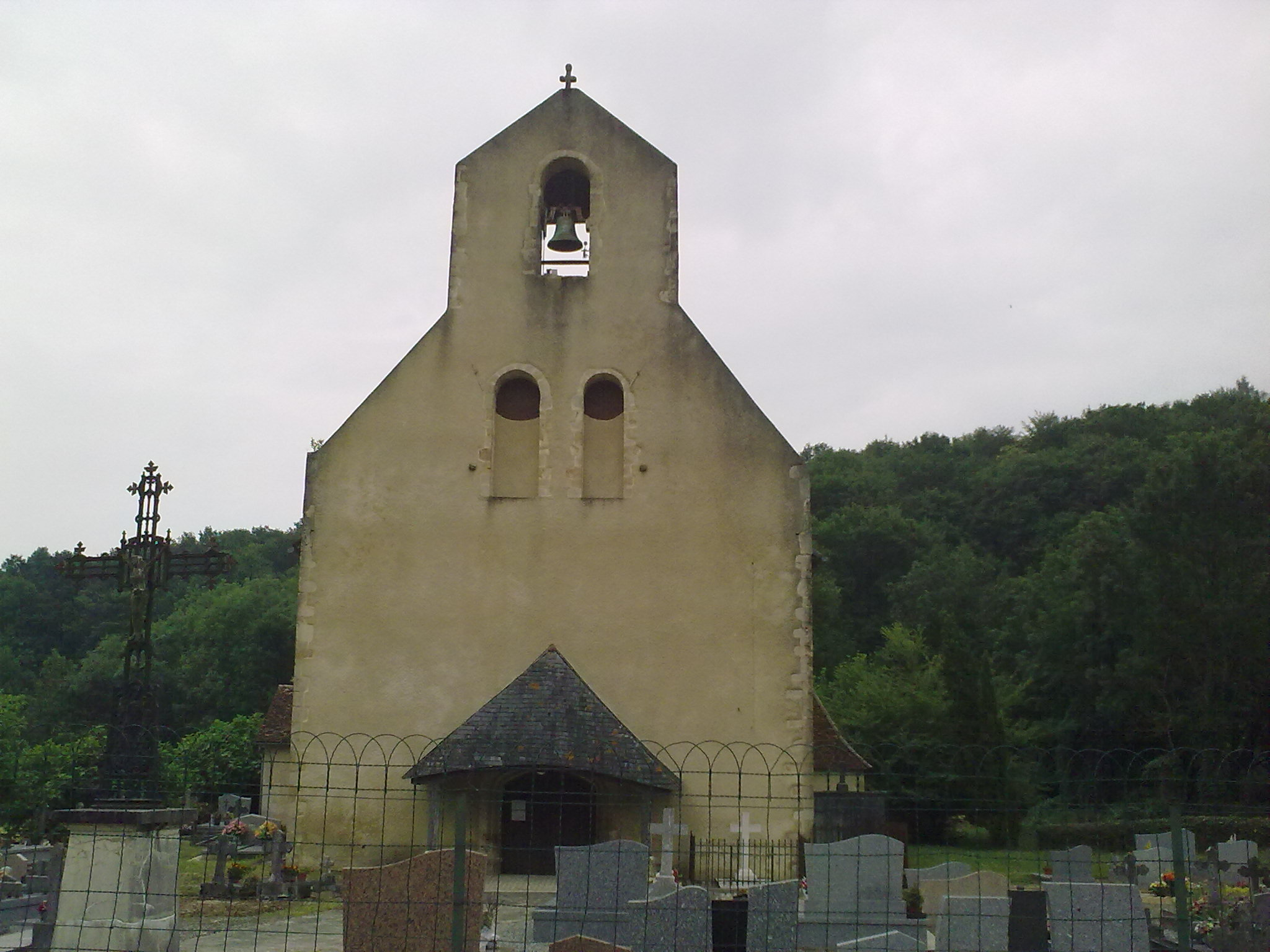
The Church of Notre-Dame.

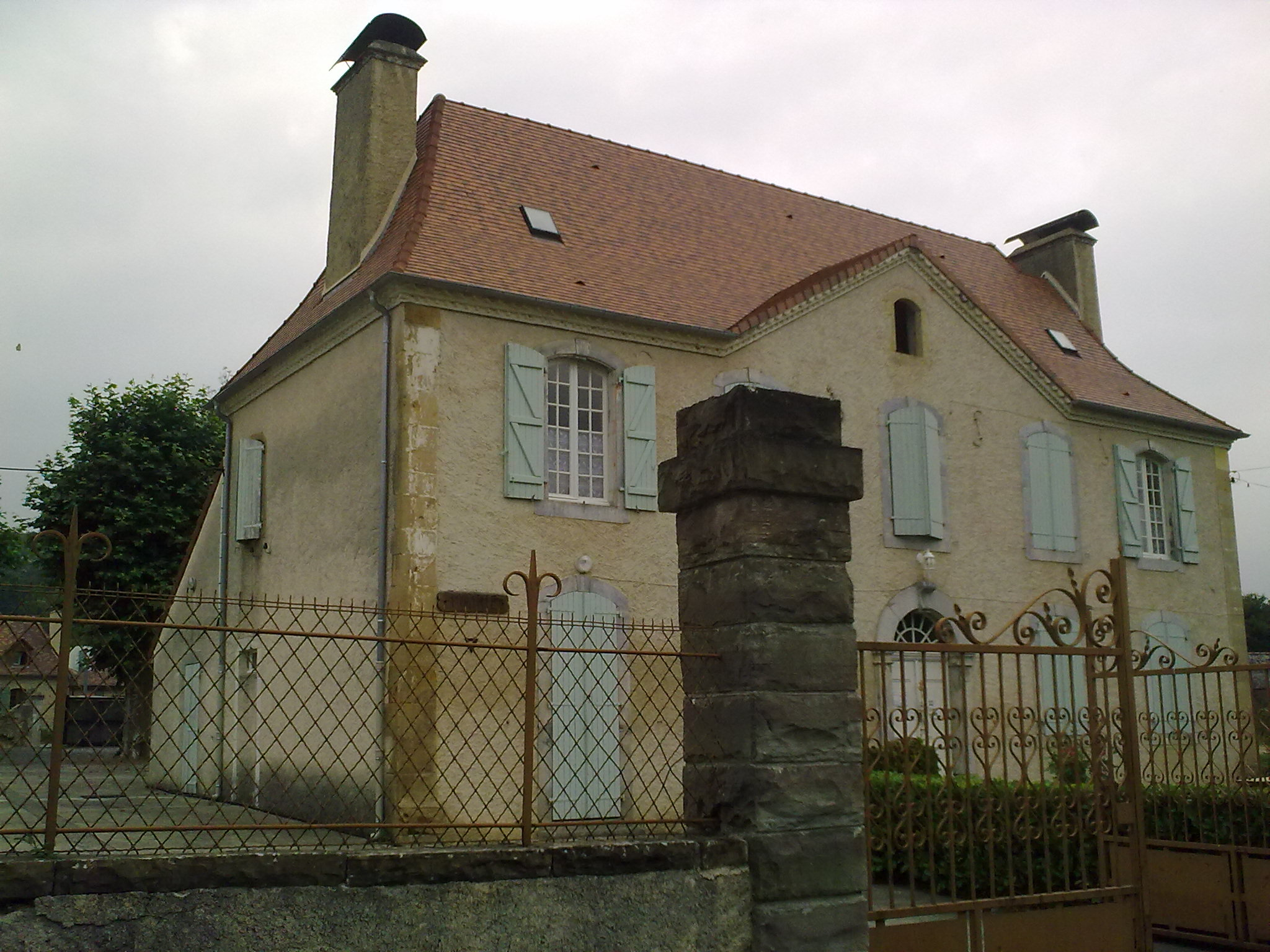
The Town Hall.

Anoye is located some 25 km north-east of Pau and 15 km west of Vic-en-Bigorre. It can be accessed by the D604 road coming north from the D7 just west of Baleix and continuing through the village and the commune north to Maspie-Lalonquere-Juillacq. The D224 road also goes east from the village to Momy and the D207 road forms part of the western border of the commune. The commune is heavily forested in the east and central west however there is a large area of farmland in a central north-south strip and also in the west.

The Léez river, a tributary of the Adour, flows from south to north in the east of the commune with a tributary forming the north-western border of the commune and another tributary forming part of the southern border. A further tributary flows east just south of the village into the Lees.

=== Historical Places and Hamlets ===
- Astis
- Bourdallé
- Cantou
- Capdepont
- Chambord
- la Commande or Lacommande
- Dibat
- Fustié
- Gassiabère
- Gué
- l'Honoré
- Hourticq
- Lasbarthes
- Latare
- Lermanou
- Mandou
- Mouly d'Anoye
- Mouly deu Poun
- Nouaou
- Perrieu
- Pessarthou
- Talabot
- Teulé
- Trianon
- Les Trois Fontaines
- Les Tuquets

== Toponymy ==
The commune name in Bearnais is Anoja (according to the classical norm of Occitan).

Brigitte Jobbé-Duval states that the origin of the name is Latin (noda or noia) and refers to a "marshland".

The following table details the origins of the commune name and other names in the commune.

| Name | Spelling | Date | Source | Page | Origin | Description |
|---|---|---|---|---|---|---|
| Anoye | Noja | 1060 | Grosclaude | | Marca | Village |
| | Anoia | 11th century | Raymond | 6 | Saint-Pé | |
| | Anoia | 1131 | Grosclaude | | | |
| | Noye | 1212 | Grosclaude | | Marca | |
| | Noia | 13th century | Raymond | 6 | Fors de Béarn | |
| | le casteg d'Anoge | 1372 | Raymond | 6 | Malta | |
| | Noye | 1385 | Raymond | 6 | Census | |
| | Sanctus Orentius de Anoya | 1485 | Raymond | 6 | Malta | |
| | Noye | 1750 | Cassini | | | |
| | Annoye | 1801 | Ldh/EHESS/Cassini | | Bulletin des lois | |
| La Brouste | La Brouste | 1778 | Raymond | 36 | Denombrement | Wood |
| Caubin de Sendets | Los Ospitals de Sendegs e de Caubin de l'ordie de Sent Johan de Jherusalem | 1341 | Raymond | 47 | Malta | Commandery of the Order of St John of Jerusalem. |
| | L'Espitau de Sendetz d'Anoya | 1492 | Raymond | 47 | Pau | |
| | L'Espitau de Scendetz | 1538 | Raymond | 47 | Reformation | |
| | l'Espitau quy lo comanday de Cauby thien | 1548 | Raymond | 47 | Reformation | |
| | Caubii de Sendets | 1585 | Raymond | 47 | Anoye | |
| | Boirie Saint-Jacques | 1585 | Raymond | 47 | Anoye | |
| | la Commande de Sendets | 1585 | Raymond | 47 | Anoye | |
| La Cave | La Cave | 1863 | Raymond | 47 | | Place |
| Chemin de la Commande | lo molin deu Pont sur le Lés | 1538 | Raymond | 51-52 | Reformation | A way between Momy and Anoye, part of the Romiu way on the Way of St James. In 1538 it designated a Mill of the Commandery of the Order of St John of Jerusalem of Caubin and Morlaàs. |

Sources:

- Grosclaude: Toponymic Dictionary of communes, Béarn, 2006 (in French)
- Raymond: Topographic Dictionary of the Department of Basses-Pyrenees, 1863, on the page numbers indicated in the table. (in French)
- Cassini: Cassini Map from 1750
- Ldh/EHESS/Cassini: Des villages de Cassini aux communes d'aujourd'hui: Commune data sheet Anoye, EHESS (in French).

Origins:

- Marca: Pierre de Marca, History of Béarn.
- Saint-Pé: Cartulary of the Abbey of Saint-Pé
- Fors de Béarn
- Malta: Titles of the Order of St John of Jerusalem
- Census: Census of Béarn
- Denombrement: Denombremont of Anoye
- Pau:
- Anoye: Titles of Anoye

== History ==
Brigitte Jobbé-Duval indicates that the village, a stop on the Way of Saint James of Compostela, was identified in the 11th century. There was also a hospital at Anoye run by the Knights of St. John of Jerusalem under the responsibility of the Commander of Caubin.

In 1385, according to the census demanded by Gaston Phoebus, the village of Anoye had 45 fires and depended on the Bailiwick of Lembeye. There was a market, three to four bakeries, and seven shops.

In 1648 the Barony of Lons became a marquisate which included Abitain, Anoye, Baleix, Castillon, Juillacq, Le Leu (a hamlet in Oraàs), Lion, Lons, Maspie, Oraàs, Peyrède (fief of Oraàs), Sauvagnon, and Viellepinte. Paul Raymond noted that Anoye was a former archpriesthood of the diocese of Lescar, a member of the Commandery of Saint John of Jerusalem, of Caubin, and of Morlaàs.

Anoye was the chief town of a district called the Clau of Anoye comprising Anoye, Maspie, Juillacq, and Lion.

== Administration ==
List of Successive Mayors

| From | To | Name |
|---|---|---|
| 1995 | 2014 | Jean Puyo |
| 2014 | 2026 | Alain Lavoye |

=== Inter-communality ===
Anoye is a member of four inter-communal structures:

- The Communauté de communes du Nord-Est Béarn;
- The SIVU of Highways of the Canton de Lembeye;
- The AEP association of the Lembeye Region;
- The Energy association of Pyrénées-Atlantiques.

== Demography ==
The inhabitants of the commune are known as Anoyais or Anoyaises in French.

Historical population

| Year | Pop. | ±% p.a. |
|---|---|---|
| 1793 | 498 | — |
| 1821 | 557 | +0.40% |
| 1846 | 552 | −0.04% |
| 1872 | 360 | −1.63% |
| 1901 | 294 | −0.70% |
| 1926 | 230 | −0.98% |
| 1946 | 183 | −1.14% |
| 1962 | 171 | −0.42% |
| 1968 | 123 | −5.34% |

| Year | Pop. | ±% p.a. |
|---|---|---|
| 1975 | 111 | −1.46% |
| 1982 | 121 | +1.24% |
| 1990 | 139 | +1.75% |
| 1999 | 142 | +0.24% |
| 2007 | 144 | +0.17% |
| 2012 | 153 | +1.22% |
| 2017 | 144 | −1.21% |
| 2023 | 140 | −0.47% |

Source: EHESS and INSEE

== Culture and Heritage ==
=== Civil heritage ===
The commune has many buildings and structures that are registered as historical monuments:

- A Fountain (1652)
- A Hospital (ruins) of the Hospitallers of Saint John of Jerusalem and the Knights of St. John of Jerusalem of Sendets, founded in 1315. The hospital had two Maltese Boundary Markers (18th century) called maltaises which are registered as historical objects. One has been in the Museum of Morlaàs since 1965 and the second has disappeared.
- A Mill at Mouly deu Poun (18th century)
- A Mill at Mouly d'Anoye (1838)
- A Bridge (1784) over the Léez.
- A Fortified Complex (11th century) (Motte-and-bailey castle, outer courtyard, moat, entry portal, church, castle) was a lordship present in the 11th century.
- A former Lay Abbey at Astis (1784)
- The Castaing House (1831)
- The Sanglar House (1788)
- The Teinto House (1861)
- The Puyo-Ladevèse Farmhouse at Mandou (1803)
- The Poudjet Farmhouse (1844)
- A Farmhouse at Pessarthou (1639)
- A Farmhouse at Nouaou (1793)
- A former Town Hall and School (1783)
- The Loste Farmhouse (19th century)
- A Farmhouse at l'Honoré (1793)
- A Farmhouse at Lermanou (19th century)
- A Farmhouse at Bourdallé (19th century)
- A Farmhouse at la Commande (19th century)
- A Farmhouse at Hourticq (19th century)
- The Guithou House (16th century)
- A Farmhouse at Fustié (19th century)
- A Farmhouse at Cantou (1807)
- Houses and Farms (17th-19th century)
- The Chateau de Salettes (17th century)
- The Maison Commune (Communal House) (1771)

=== Religious heritage ===
The commune has several religious buildings and sites that are registered as historical monuments:

- A Presbytery (1701)
- The Parish Church of Saint-Orens (remains) which was at a place called Astis until the 18th century.
- The Parish Church of Notre Dame (12th century) was a former chapel from the 12th, 13th, and 14th centuries and was rebuilt in 1757, 1764, and 1878. The church contains many items which are registered as historical objects:
  - Furniture
  - 7 Stained glass windows
  - 3 Paintings
  - 9 Statues
  - A Cemetery Cross
  - A Tombstone

Anoye is a stage on the via Tolosane (or Toulouse route) on the Way of St James.

== See also ==
- Communes of the Pyrénées-Atlantiques department
