= Abitain =

- Commune
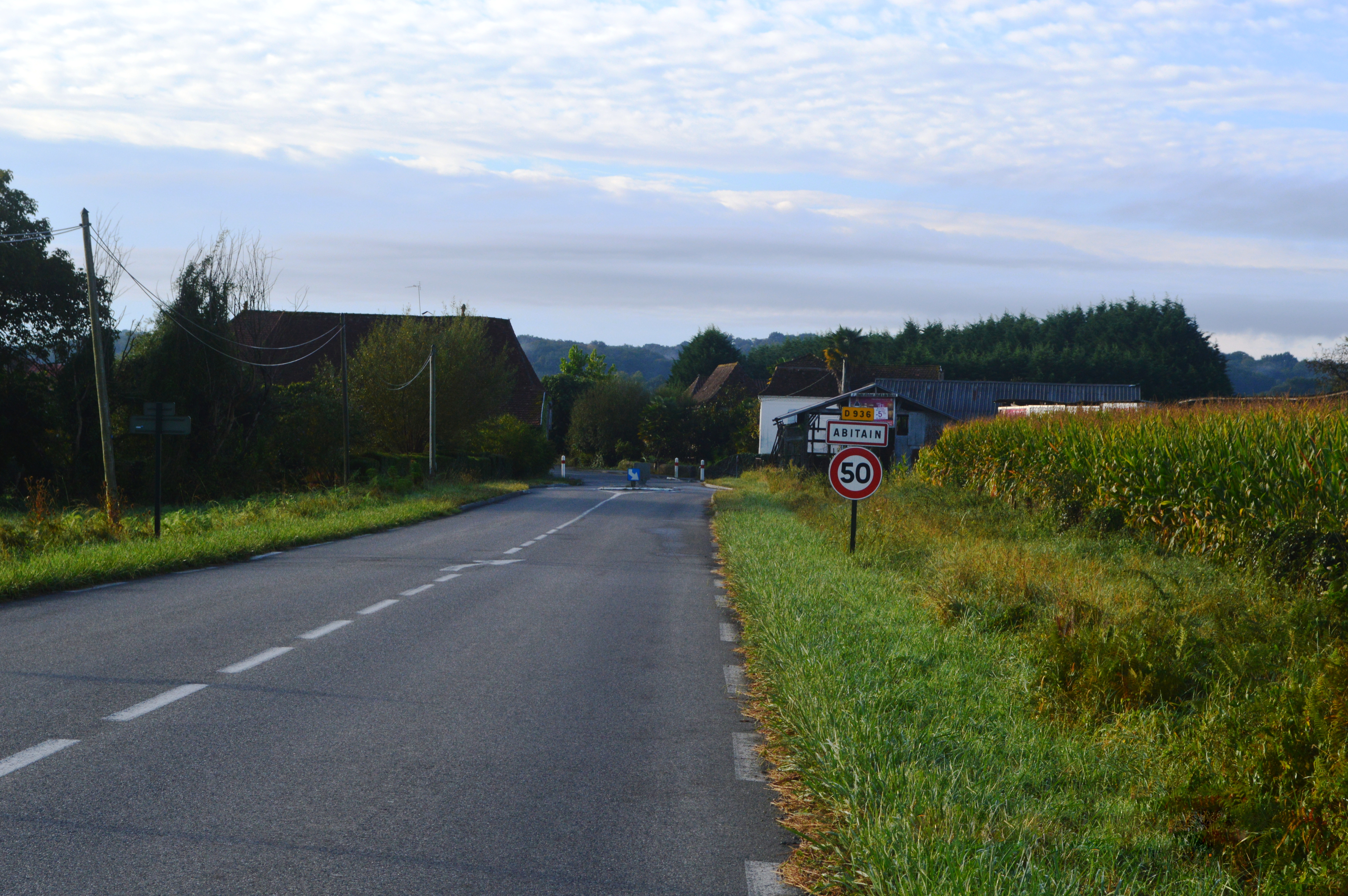
- The road into Abitain
- Location of Abitain
- Location within France Location within Nouvelle-Aquitaine
- Coordinates: 43°25′16″N 0°59′17″W
- Country: France
- Region: Nouvelle-Aquitaine
- Department: Pyrénées-Atlantiques
- Arrondissement: Oloron-Sainte-Marie
- Canton: Orthez et Terres des Gaves et du Sel
- Intercommunality: Béarn des Gaves

Government
  - Mayor (2024–2026): Christophe Nicolas
- Area^{1}: 6.59 km^{2} (2.54 sq mi)
- Elevation: 62 m (203 ft)
- Highest elevation: 136 m (446 ft)
- Lowest elevation: 28 m (92 ft)
- Population (2023): 120
  - Density: 18/km^{2} (47/sq mi)
- Demonym(s): Abitainois, Abitainoises
- Time zone: UTC+01:00 (CET)
  - Summer (DST): UTC+02:00 (CEST)
- INSEE/Postal code: 64004 /64390
- ^{1} French Land Register data, which excludes lakes, ponds, glaciers > 1 km^{2} (0.386 sq mi or 247 acres) and river estuaries.

Abitain (French pronunciation: [abitɛ̃]; Basque: Abitaine) is a commune in the Pyrénées-Atlantiques department in the Nouvelle-Aquitaine region in southwestern France.

== Geography ==
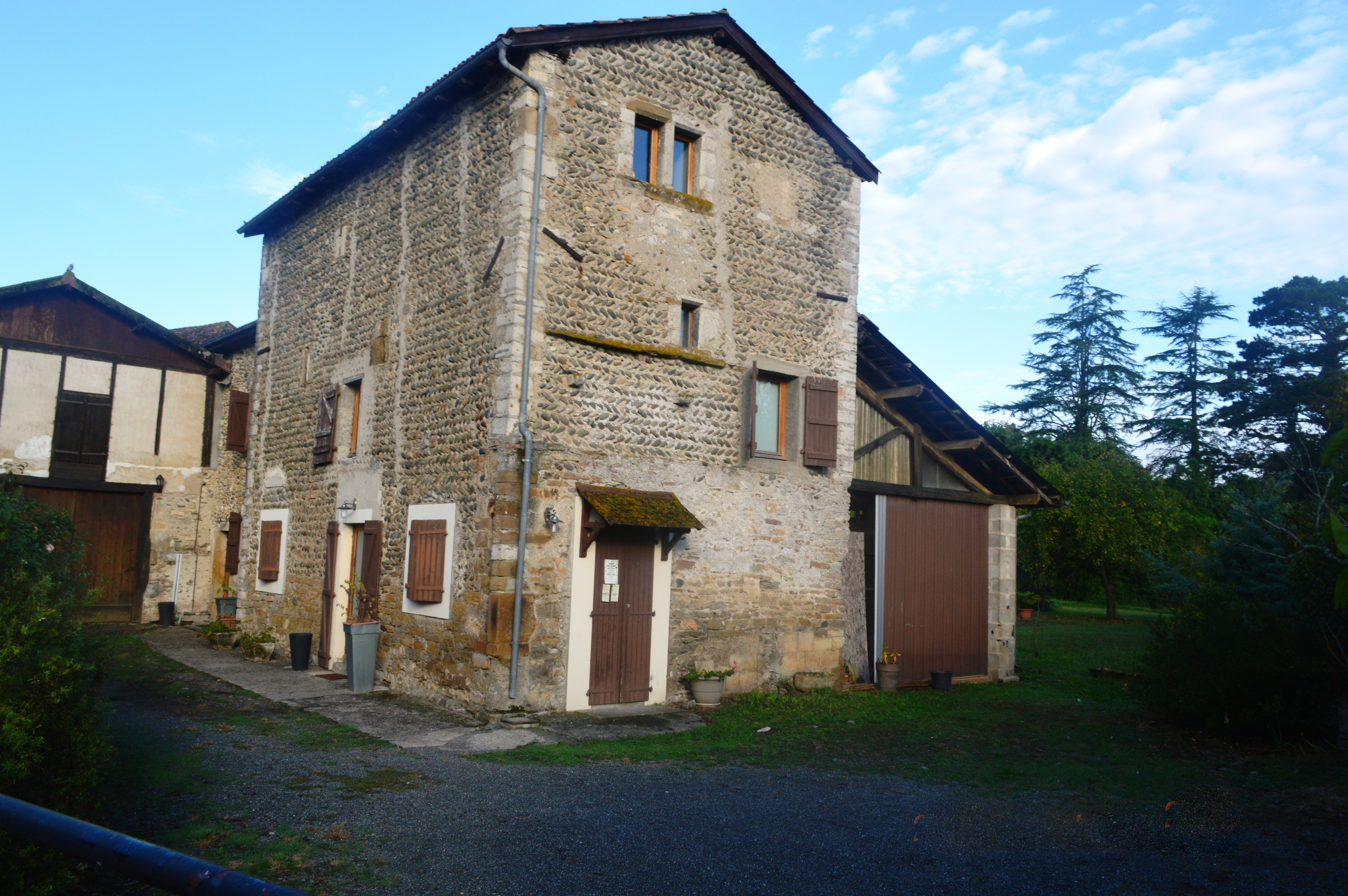
A House in Abitain

=== Location ===
Abitain is bordered on the eastern side by the Gave d'Oloron about 20 km southeast of Peyrehorade and 11 km southwest of Salies-de-Béarn. Access to the commune is by road D936 from Escos in the north, passing south down the eastern side of the commune through the village and continuing to Autevielle-Saint-Martin-Bideren in the south.

=== Hydrography ===
Located in the Drainage basin of the Adour, the commune's eastern border is the Gave d'Oloron, which joins the Gave de Pau at Peyrehorade which flows a further 10 km as the Gaves Réunis before joining the Adour river. A number of small streams flow in the commune including Le Crabé which flows into the Gave d'Oloron at the northern border of the commune and the Arrioutèque creek.

=== Localities and hamlets ===
- Aunès
- Benes
- Le Bois
- Bonnefont
- la Bordenave
- Constantine
- Coustalat
- Couyoula
- Dupont
- Etchebarne
- Labie
- Lafite
- Lartigue
- Latéoulère
- le Lot
- Peyre
- Plain
- Pouey
- Reyen
- Richard
- Ségabache
- Treyture
- La Tuilerie

== Toponymy ==
The commune's name in Béarnais is Avitenh.

Michel Grosclaude proposed a Latin etymology of Avitus (name of a man called "Avit") plus the Gascon suffix -enh.

The following table details the origins of the commune name and other names in the commune.

Name	Spelling	Date	Source	Page	Origin	Description
Abitain	Bitengs	13th century	Raymond	2	Bayonne	Village
	Bitenh	1385	Raymond	2	Census	
	Abithen	1439	Raymond	2	Notaries	
	Sent-Pee d'Abitehn	1472	Raymond	2	Notaries	
	Havitenh	1538	Raymond	2	Reformation	
	Avitenh	1546	Raymond	2	Reformation	
	Aviteing	1608	Raymond	2	Insinuations	
	Avitein	1786	Raymond	2	Regulations	
	Abitain	1750	Cassini			
Aunès	l'ostau d'Ones	1385	Raymond	17	Census	Farm and Fief, Barony created in March 1775, vassal of the Viscounts of Béarn
	La maison noble de Donez	1666	Raymond	17	Reformation	
	Omeix	1666	Raymond	17	Denombrement	
	Aunez	1863	Raymond	17		
Bonnefont	Bonehont	1385	Raymond	33	Census	Fief, dependent on the Marquisate of Gassion
	Bonafont	1538	Raymond	33	Reformation	
Lafite	L'ostau de Lafite d'Abitenh	1538	Raymond	89	Reformation	Fief, dependent on the Viscounts of Béarn
Parlabriu	L'ostau de Part-l'Arriu d'Abitenh	1385	Raymond	132	Census	Farm and Fief, vassal of the Viscounts of Béarn and subject to the bailiwick of Sauveterre
	Partarriu	1546	Raymond	132	Reformation	
	Pallarriu	1778	Raymond	132	Terrier	
La Peyre	La Peyre	1863	Raymond	134	Census	Place
Pouey	Poey	1755	Raymond	136	Denombrement	Fief, vassal of the Viscounts of Béarn
	Poey	1863	Raymond	136		
La Tuilerie	La Teulere	1537	Raymond	169	Chapter	Fief
	La Tuilerie	1863	Raymond	169		

Sources:

- Raymond: Topographic Dictionary of the Department of Basses-Pyrenees, 1863, on the page numbers indicated in the table. (in French)
- Grosclaude: Toponymic Dictionary of communes, Béarn, 2006 (in French)
- Cassini: Cassini Map from 1750

Origins:

- Bayonne: Cartulary of Bayonne or Livre d'Or (Book of Gold)
- Census: Census of Béarn
- Notaries: Notaries of Labastide-Villefranche
- Reformation: Reformation of Béarn
- Insinuations: Insinuations of the Diocese of Oloron
- Regulations: Regulations of the States of Béarn (in French)
- Denombrement: Denombremont
- Terrier: Terrier of Abitain.
- Chapter: Titles of the Chapter of Bayonne

== History ==
The village of Abitain formed on the left bank of the Gave d'Oloron around its Lay Abbey, vassal of the Viscounts of Bearn, a building which still remains. The families of Belloc then Claverie were the abbot patrons of the parish. The tomb of the last lay abbot of Abitain, who died in 1785, is in the church of Saint-Pierre.

Paul Raymond, on page 2 of his 1863 dictionary, noted that in 1385 the town had 15 fires and depended on the bailiwick of Sauveterre.

In 1648 the barony of Lons became a marquisate, which included Abitain, Anoye, Baleix, Castillon, Juillacq, Le Leu (hamlet Oraàs), Samsons-Lion, Lons, Maspie, Oraàs, Peyrède (fief Oraàs), Sauvagnon, and Viellepinte.

The village had two mills: one at Leü (which actually depended on Oraàs) and one at Séguabache - now a sawmill.

In 1856, Ferdinand Carrère, heir to the last Lay Abbey demolished the old abbey castle to build Carrère castle in Escos.

In February 1814, the town was occupied by the troops of General Morillo and by the English, facing the French entrenched in Oraàs.

A famous ferry - where there was a tragic accident in 1845 - has long been in service between Moliède and Athos.

== Administration ==
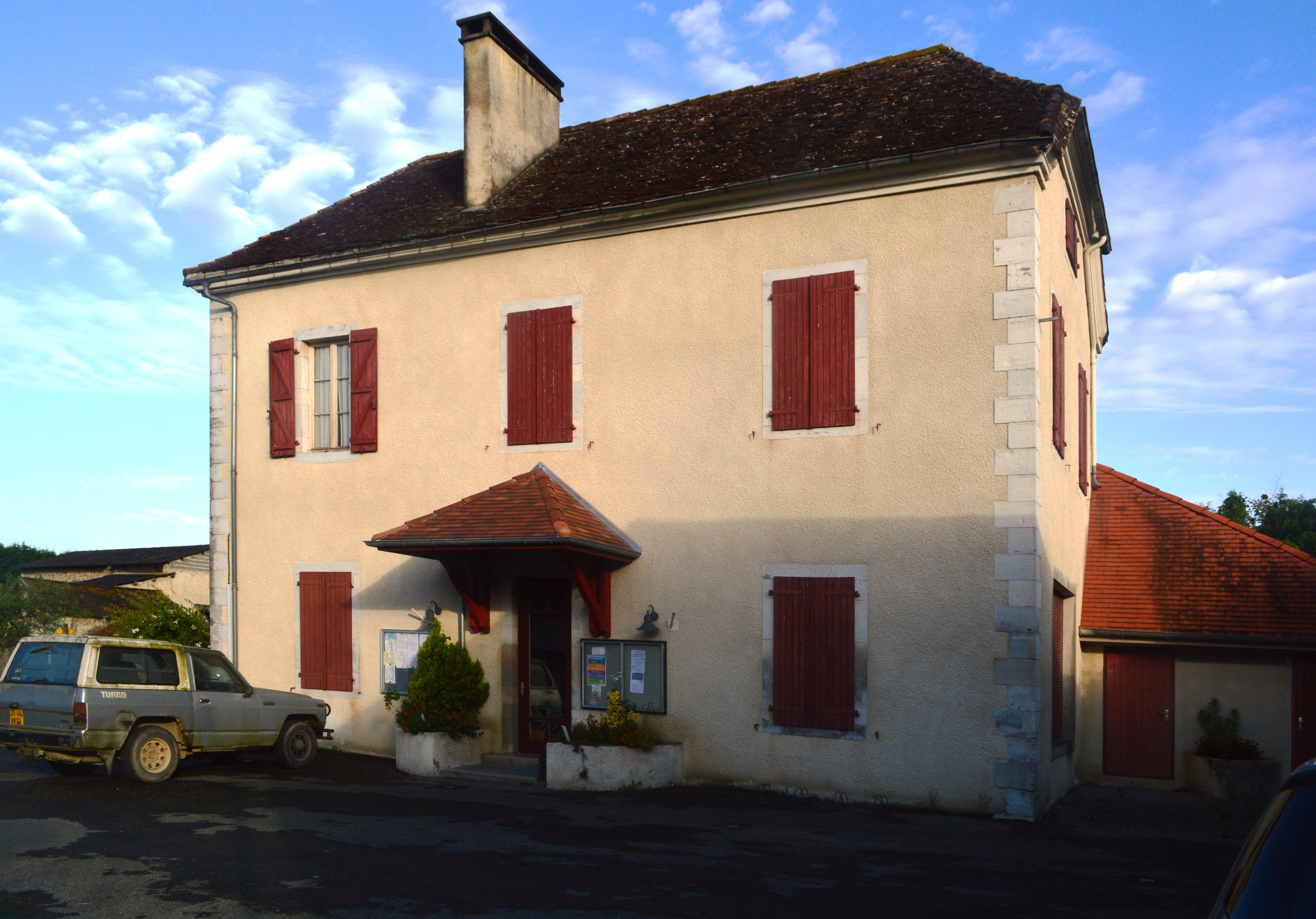
The Town Hall

List of Successive Mayors of Abitain

From	To	Name	Party
1935	1940	Pierre de Chevigné	
1945	1965	Pierre de Chevigné	MRP
1995	2001	Denise Saint-Pé	UDF
2001	2008	Victor Masero	DVD
2008	2014	Didier Lasserre	
2014	2024	Marc Seguin	
2024	2026	Christophe Nicolas	

=== Intercommunality ===
The town is a member of seven inter-communal organisations:

- the Communauté de communes du Béarn des Gaves
- the Public agency for local management
- the inter-communal centre for social action of Sauveterre-de-Béarn;
- the intercommunal union of communal associations of Gave d'Oloron and Mauléon-Licharre
- the inter-communal union for Rivers and Lakes
- the AEP Union of Sauveterre-de-Béarn
- the Energy Union of Pyrénées-Atlantiques

== Population ==
The inhabitants are known as Abitainois, or Abitaonoises in French.

Historical population

Year	Pop.	±% p.a.
1793	315	—
1821	344	+0.32%
1846	325	−0.23%
1872	307	−0.22%
1901	296	−0.13%
1926	252	−0.64%
1946	230	−0.46%
1962	172	−1.80%
1968	158	−1.41%

Year	Pop.	±% p.a.
1975	143	−1.41%
1982	138	−0.51%
1990	126	−1.13%
1999	107	−1.80%
2007	102	−0.60%
2012	98	−0.80%
2017	102	+0.80%
2023	120	+2.75%

Source: EHESS and INSEE

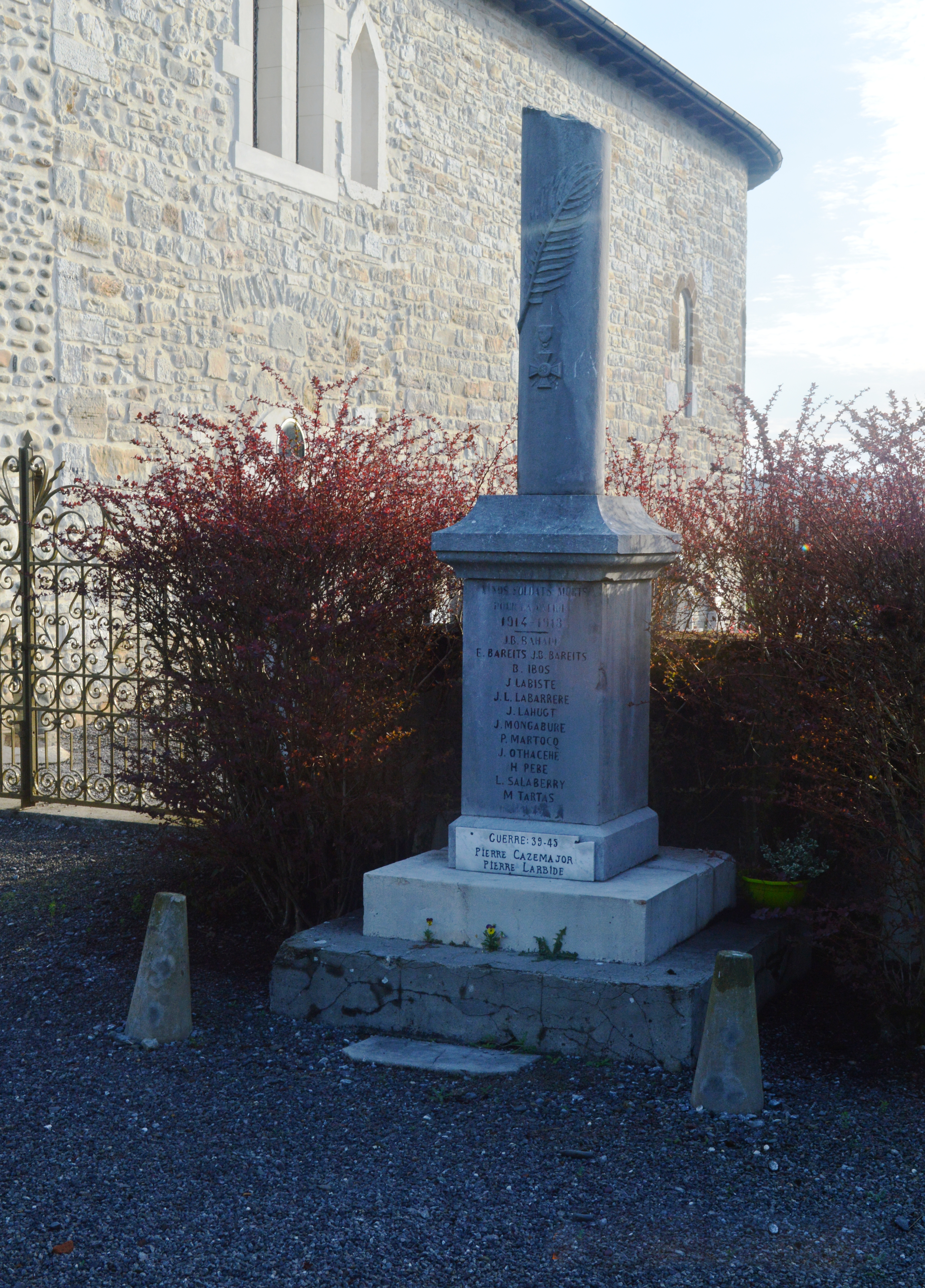
Abitain War Memorial

== Economy ==
The activity of the commune is mainly agricultural. A sawmill is also in operation.

The town is part of the Appellation d'origine contrôlée (AOC) zone designation of Ossau-iraty.

== Culture and Heritage ==
=== Civil heritage ===
There are only the ruins of the Leu mill which have been the subject of numerous lawsuits. Another mill, called Séguabache, is the current sawmill and is easily visible in the commune.

=== Religious Heritage ===
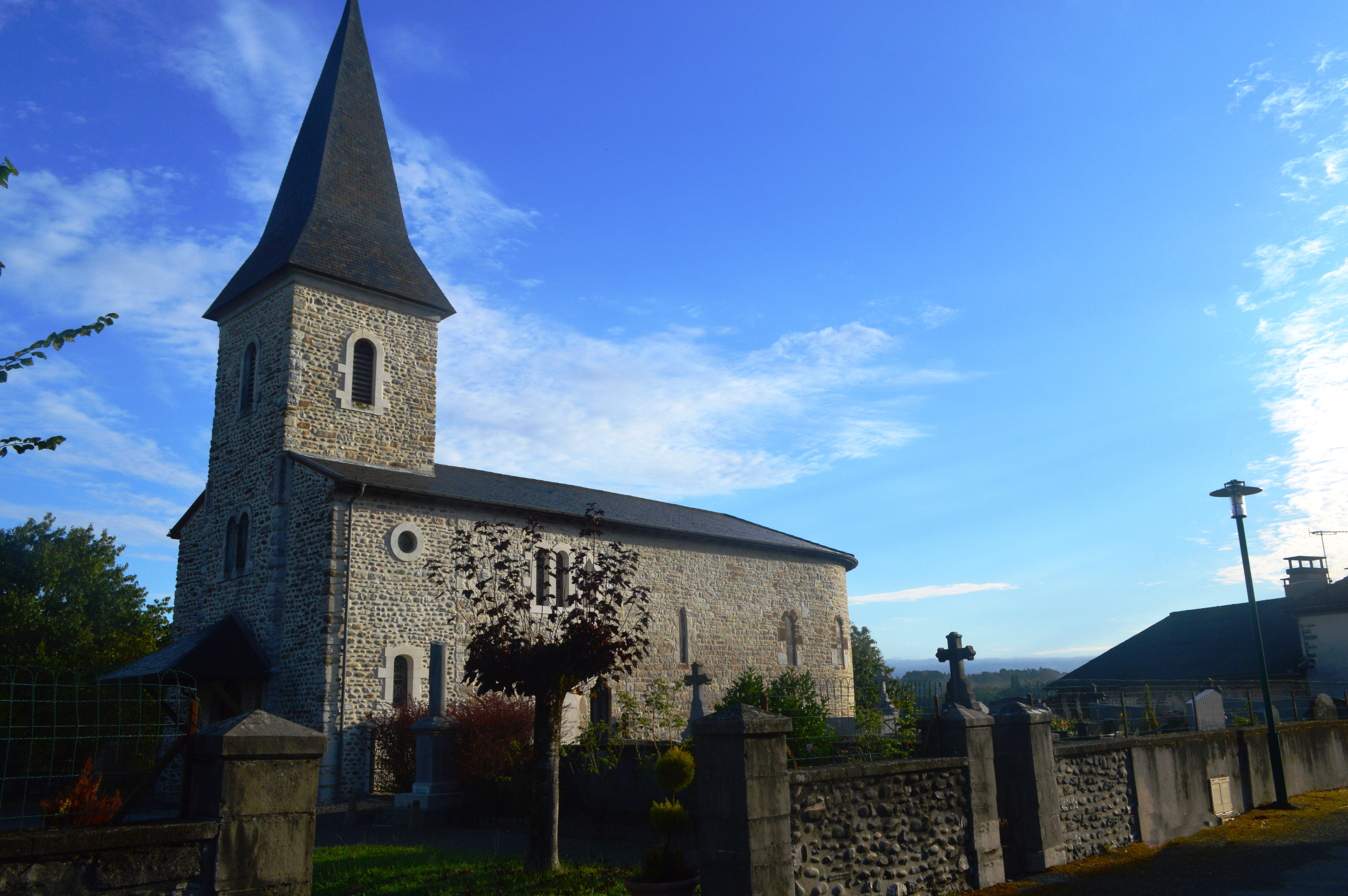
The Church of Saint Pierre

During the construction of the clock tower in 1926 what remained of the old lay abbey was destroyed. In the old abbey there was a special room where the Lord of the Manor could overlook the church choir and follow the Mass without being in the crowd. The abbey enclosure can still be seen.

The Tombstone of the last lord of Abitain was discovered during the restoration of the church. It was marked on the wall of the church to preserve its memory.

The Parish Church of Saint Pierre (19th century), of Romanesque origin, still has the arms of the Abitain abbots (Blason: Azure, with two stars Or in chief) from the burial of the last abbot. There is a 16th-century window of Germanic origin. Also in the church (in the attic) is an altarpiece from the 17th century.

The Cemetery contains the graves of priests and that of Father Joffre, Capuchin missionary in Canada who died at Abitain in 1909. There is also the tomb of Colonel Count Pierre de Chevigne, Companion of the Liberation, one of the greats of béarnaise politics and a strong and faithful supporter of General de Gaulle. The coat of arms of Chevigne are engraved on his tomb with the motto "Quod decet". He donated land and equipment to the communes of Abitain and Escos.

== Notable People linked to the Commune ==
- Pierre de Chevigné, born in Toulon in 1909 and died in Biarritz in 2004 was a colonel and French politician, a Minister in the Fourth Republic and a companion of the Liberation. He was mayor of Abitain from 1935 to 1940 and from 1945 to 1965.

== See also ==
- Communes of the Pyrénées-Atlantiques department
