= Abère =

- Commune
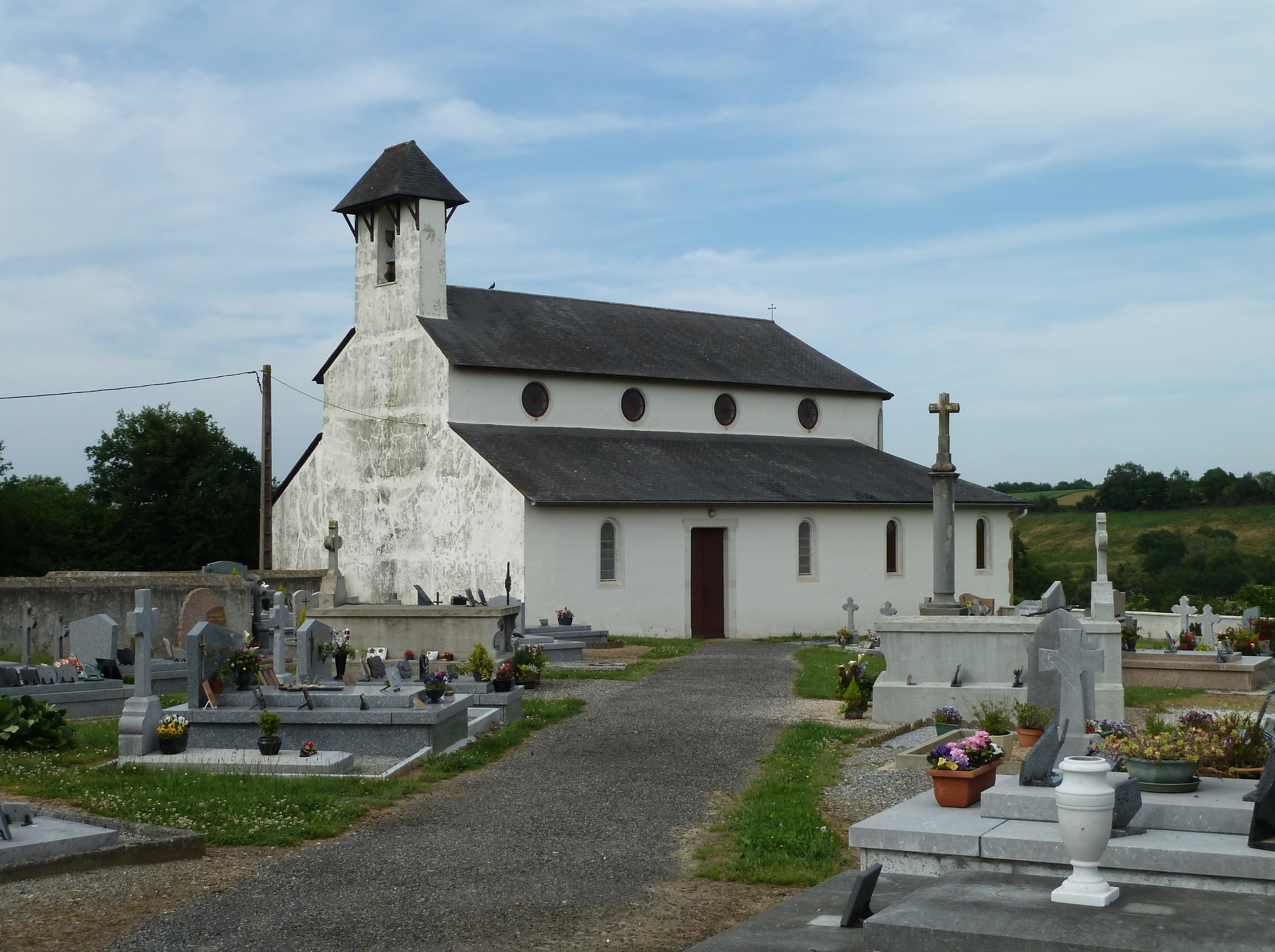
- The church of Abère
- Location of Abère
- Location within France Location within Nouvelle-Aquitaine
- Coordinates: 43°23′26″N 0°10′28″W
- Country: France
- Region: Nouvelle-Aquitaine
- Department: Pyrénées-Atlantiques
- Arrondissement: Pau
- Canton: Pays de Morlaàs et du Montanérès
- Intercommunality: Nord-Est Béarn

Government
  - Mayor (2020–2026): Myriam Cuillet
- Area^{1}: 5.81 km^{2} (2.24 sq mi)
- Elevation: 335 m (1,099 ft)
- Highest elevation: 346 m (1,135 ft)
- Lowest elevation: 239 m (784 ft)
- Population (2023): 156
  - Density: 26.9/km^{2} (69.5/sq mi)
- Demonym(s): Abérois, Abéroises
- Time zone: UTC+01:00 (CET)
  - Summer (DST): UTC+02:00 (CEST)
- INSEE/Postal code: 64002 /64160
- ^{1} French Land Register data, which excludes lakes, ponds, glaciers > 1 km^{2} (0.386 sq mi or 247 acres) and river estuaries.

Abère (French pronunciation: [abɛʁ]; Béarnese: Avera) is a commune in the Pyrénées-Atlantiques department in the Nouvelle-Aquitaine region in southwestern France.

== Geography ==
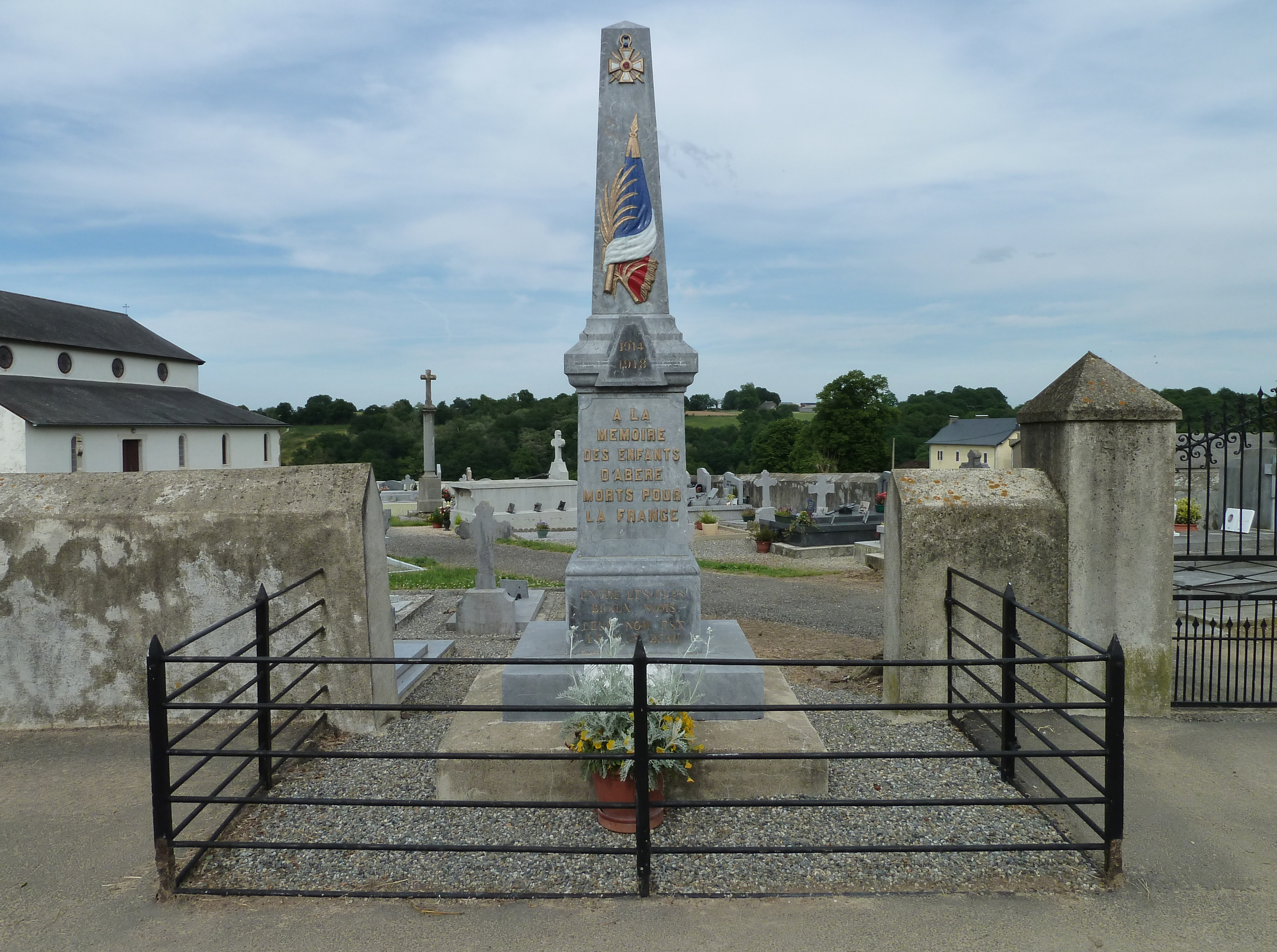
Memorial to the war dead of Abère

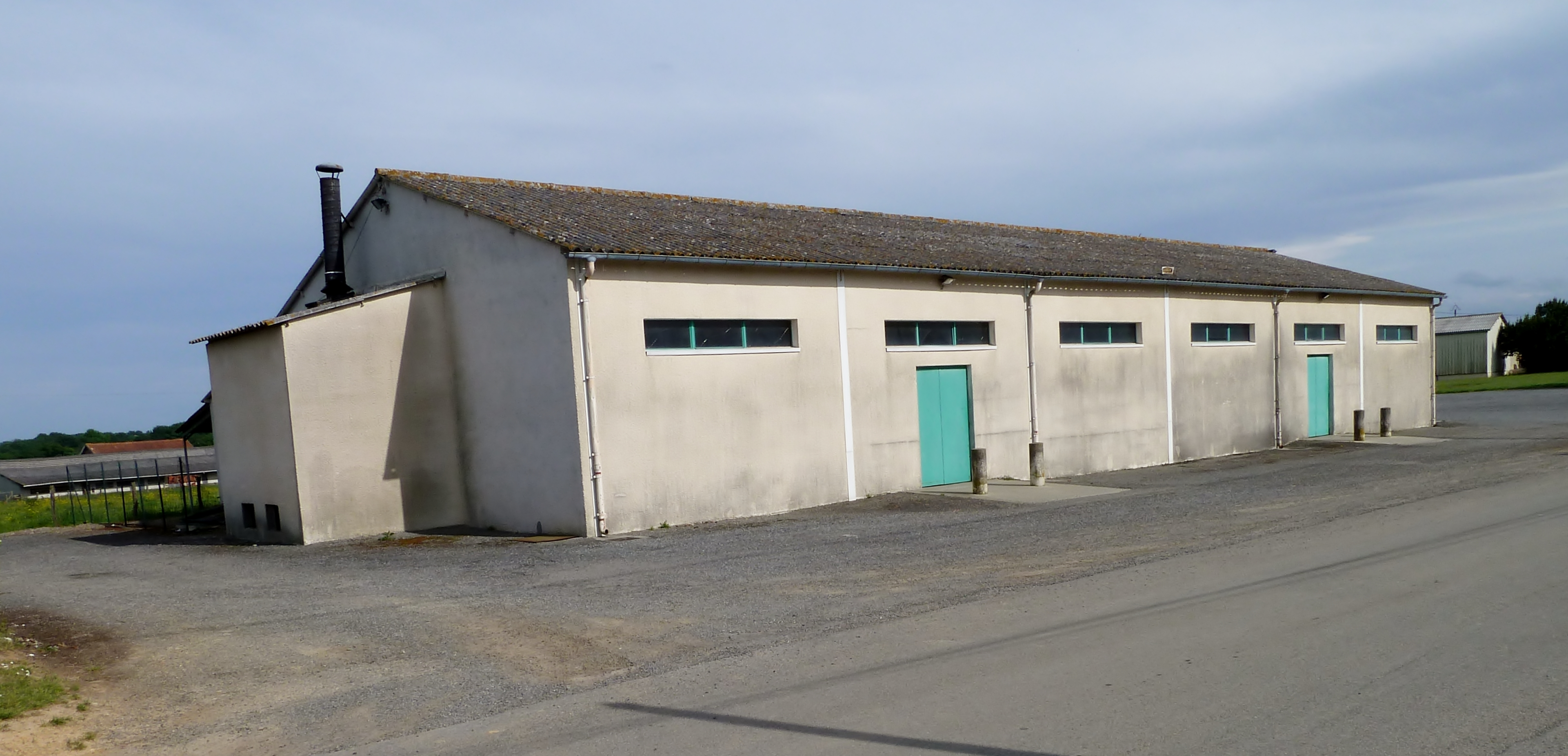
The Abère public hall.

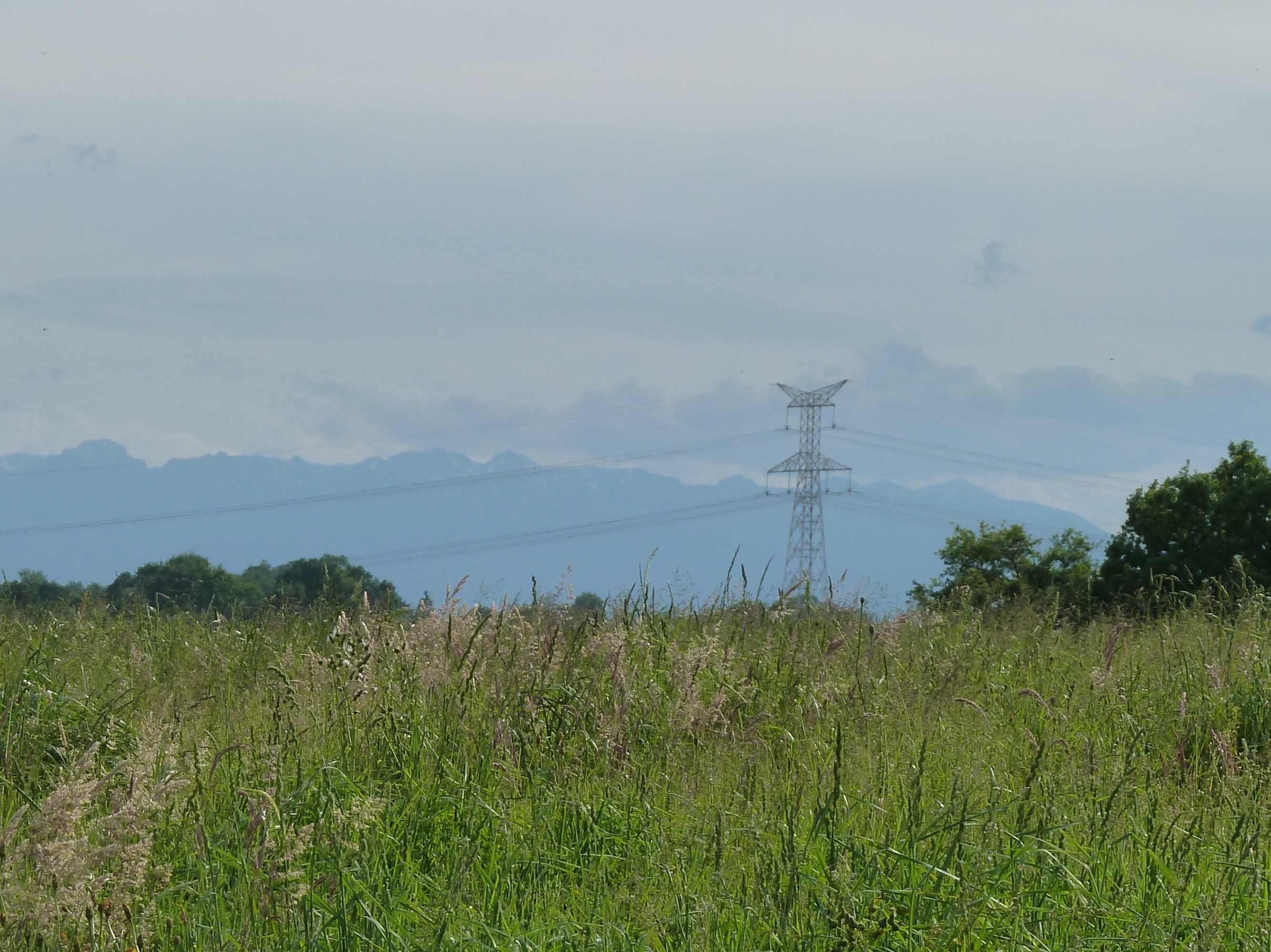
The Pyrénées from Abère.

=== Location ===
Abère is located some 22 km northeast of Pau and some 9 km northeast of Morlaas. The D7 road (Route de Vic) heading east from Saint-Jammes passes through the southern portion of the commune and continues to Baleix. Access to the village is by the Chemin de Lapoutge going north from the D7 for about 6 km. The Highway D207 coming south from Simacourbe forms the eastern boundary of the commune. The commune is mostly farmland with forests in the north and east

=== Hydrography ===
Located in the watershed of the Adour, the Grand Léez river forms the western border of the commune, with the Arriutort joining it at the northern tip of the commune and forming the northeastern border of the commune.

=== Localities and hamlets ===
- Bartot
- Berducq
- Bordenave
- Briscoulet
- Courde
- Crouquet
- Hourcade
- Labat
- Larré
- Piarrette
- Salabert
- La Teulère

=== Toponymy ===
The name Abère was mentioned in the tenth century (according to Pierre de Marca) and appeared in the forms:

- Oere and Bere (1385 Census of Béarn),
- Vere and Avere (1385 Census of Morlaàs, but uncertain if it is the same locality),
- Oeyre was mentioned in 1487 Registry of Béarnais businesses.
- Abere appears on the Cassini Map of 1750 and in the 1790 map, Bulletin of Laws.

Michel Grosclaude proposed a Latin etymology of abellana or abella, derived from the Béarnais abera (according to Brigitte Jobbé-Duval.), which means "hazelnut" and by extension "the hazel copse"

The commune's name in Béarnais is Avera.

== History ==
Paul Raymond noted that in 1385, there were 8 fires in Abère and that it depended on the bailiwick of Pau. A barony was created in 1672, a vassal of the Viscounts of Béarn. The commune was part of the Archdiocese of Vic-Bihl, which in turn depended on the Diocese of Lescar of which Lembeye was the capital.

Its Lay Abbey, the house of Bosom d'Abadie is mentioned in 1385.

== Administration ==
List of Successive Mayors of Abère

From	To	Name
1995	2008	Jean-Pierre Lortet
2008	2014	Claude Conte-Hourticq
2014	Current	Myriam Cuillet

=== Intercommunality ===
Abère is a member of three inter-communal organisations:

- the community of communes of Nord-Est Béarn
- the AEP Union for the Luy and Gabas Regions
- the energy Union of the Pyrénées-Atlantiques

== Population ==
Historical population

Year	Pop.	±% p.a.
1793	296	—
1821	194	−1.50%
1846	272	+1.36%
1872	230	−0.64%
1901	212	−0.28%
1926	160	−1.12%
1946	154	−0.19%
1962	150	−0.16%
1968	140	−1.14%

Year	Pop.	±% p.a.
1975	133	−0.73%
1982	132	−0.11%
1990	123	−0.88%
1999	133	+0.87%
2007	142	+0.82%
2012	156	+1.90%
2017	162	+0.76%
2023	156	−0.63%

Source: EHESS (1793-1999) and INSEE

== Culture and Heritage ==
=== Civil heritage ===
Several structures are listed as historical monuments in the commune. These are:

- Tile factory at la Teulère
- Former Lay Abbey: the Bosom d'Abadie
- Town Hall (former Presbytery) (19th century)
- Chateau of Bordenave d'Abère (1732)
- Menyucq House farm (1841)
- Houses and Farms (19th century)

=== Religious Heritage ===
- The Church of St. John the Baptist (16th century) The church contains several historical objects. These are:
  - Processional Cross (17th century)
  - Altar Cross
  - Painting: Christ on the Cross with Saint John, the Virgin, and Saint John the Baptist (18th century)
  - Baptismal Fonts (12th century)
  - 4 Altar Candlesticks
  - 2 statues: Angels holding a column and a scale
  - Tabernacle
  - Altar (18th century)
  - Altar, Tabernacle, and 4 Candlesticks at the secondary altar

== See also ==
- Communes of the Pyrénées-Atlantiques department
