= Argagnon =

- Commune
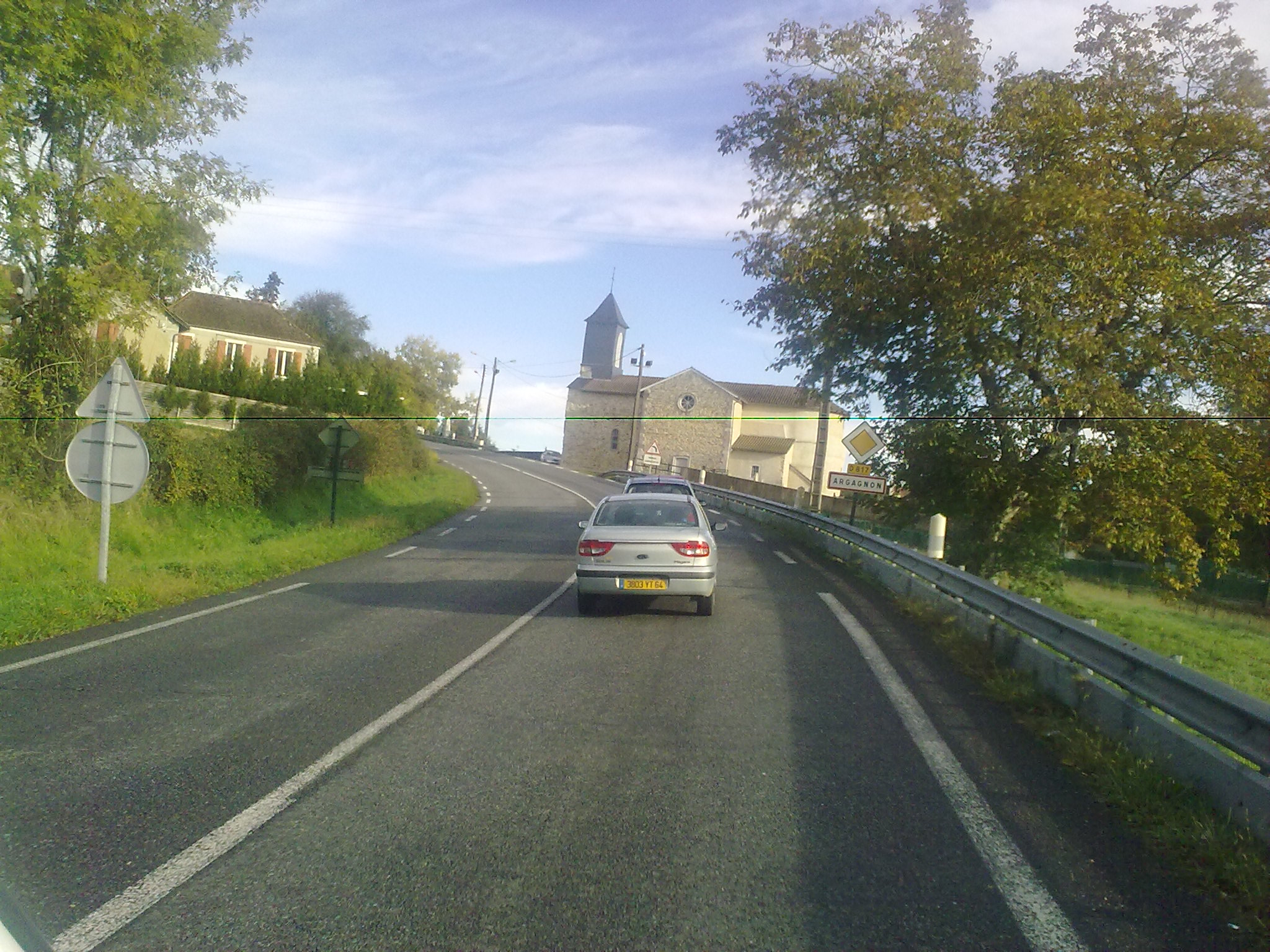
- Entry to Argagnon
- Location of Argagnon
- Location within France Location within Nouvelle-Aquitaine
- Coordinates: 43°27′27″N 0°40′52″W
- Country: France
- Region: Nouvelle-Aquitaine
- Department: Pyrénées-Atlantiques
- Arrondissement: Pau
- Canton: Artix et Pays de Soubestre
- Intercommunality: Lacq-Orthez

Government
  - Mayor (2020–2026): Gilles Leveque
- Area^{1}: 9.33 km^{2} (3.60 sq mi)
- Elevation: 106 m (348 ft)
- Highest elevation: 209 m (686 ft)
- Lowest elevation: 66 m (217 ft)
- Population (2023): 690
  - Density: 74/km^{2} (190/sq mi)
- Time zone: UTC+01:00 (CET)
  - Summer (DST): UTC+02:00 (CEST)
- INSEE/Postal code: 64042 /64300
- ^{1} French Land Register data, which excludes lakes, ponds, glaciers > 1 km^{2} (0.386 sq mi or 247 acres) and river estuaries.

Argagnon (French pronunciation: [aʁɡaɲɔ̃]; Occitan: Arganhon) is a commune in the Pyrénées-Atlantiques department in the Nouvelle-Aquitaine region of south-western France.

== Geography ==
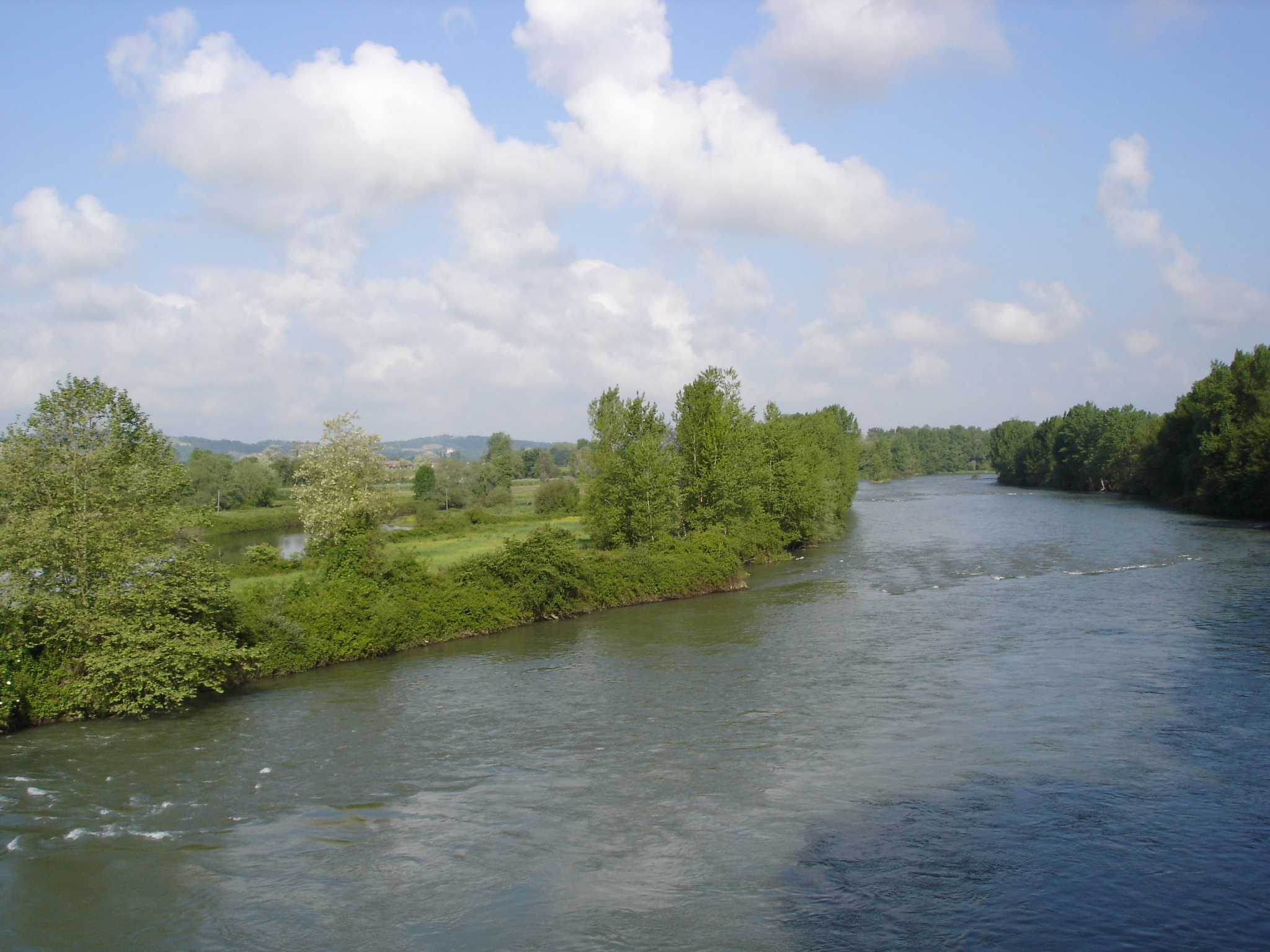
The Gave de Pau at Aragnon

Argagnon is located some 7 km south-east of Orthez and 2 km north-west of Maslacq. Access to the commune is by the D817 road from Orthez which passes through the village and continues south-east to Artix. The D275 from Maslacq to Arthez-de-Béarn passes through the eastern part of the commune. The Toulouse-Bayonne railway passes through the south of the commune parallel to the D817 but there is no station in the commune. The nearest stations are at Orthez to the north-west and Lacq to the south-east. The commune consists mostly of farmland however there are forests in the east and north of the commune.

The commune lies in the Drainage basin of the Adour and the Gave de Pau flows through the south-western edge of the commune with the Ruisseau de Clamonde flowing into it from the commune. Paul Raymond mentioned in 1863 that the Juren, a stream with its source in Arthez-de-Béarn, crossed Aragnon and flowed into the Gave de Pau

=== Places and Hamlets ===
- Arramoun
- Arrigran
- Arriscle
- Arvélé
- Audios
- Baraten
- Bataille
- Bernès
- Bouhaben
- Cazenave
- Cazot
- Château Champetier
- Chou
- Claverie
- Clerc
- Soum de Coste
- Daubagna
- Guillemet
- Houndière
- Jouanbayle
- Lacamuse
- Lachourute
- Lahoueillâde
- Larréc
- Larrus
- Lassègue
- Lasserre
- Lescloupé
- Lirou
- Louncouat
- Lourtas
- Lourteigt
- Marcerin
- Marchand
- Marquittou
- Maysonnave
- Mirabel
- Momas
- Mouillade
- Moullié
- Nicot
- Pédauque
- Pehau
- Pierre Grand
- Poumé
- Pradot
- Puyôo
- Roc
- Sabaté
- Sarraillot
- Sauvajunte
- Tisné

== Toponymy ==
Its name in Béarnais is Arganhon. Brigitte Jobbé-Duval indicated that the name Argagnon originated from the first owner, Arcanius, and was expanded with the suffix -onem giving the meaning "Domain of Arcanius".

The following table details the origins of the commune name and other names in the commune.

Name	Spelling	Date	Source	Page	Origin	Description
Argagnon	Arganion	977	Raymond	10	Bigorre	Village
	Argalhoo	1376	Raymond	10	Military	
	Arguanhoo	1385	Raymond	10	Census	
	Arganhoo	1546	Raymond	10	Reformation	
	Argagnon	1750	Cassini			
	Argagnon-Marcerin	1851	Raymond	10		
Castéra	Casterar	1538	Raymond	44	Reformation	Fief, vassal of the Viscounts of Béarn
Les Castets	Les Castets	1779	Raymond	46	Marcerin	Place
Marcerin	Marsserü	1345	Raymond	108	Pardies	Village
	Marsserü	1385	Raymond	108	Census	
	Marsery	1779	Raymond	108	Marcerin	
	Marcery	1793	Ldh/EHESS/Cassini			

Sources:

- Raymond: Topographic Dictionary of the Department of Basses-Pyrenees, 1863, on the page numbers indicated in the table. (in French)
- Ldh/EHESS/Cassini: Des villages de Cassini aux communes d'aujourd'hui: Commune data sheet Marcerin, EHESS (in French).

Origins:

- Bigorre: Cartulary of Bigorre
- Military: Military Inspection of Béarn
- Census: Census of Béarn
- Reformation: Reformation of Béarn
- Marcerin: The Terrier of Marcerin.
- Pardies: Notaries of Pardies

== History ==
In 1385 Argagnon and Marcerin depended on the bailiwick of Pau. Argagnon at that time had 9 fires and Marcerin had 12.

The Lords of Argagnon were the Castera family

Argagnon until 1846 was part of the Canton of Lagor. The commune merged with Marcerin on 8 April 1851 to form the commune of Argagnon-Marcerin.

During the German occupation from 1940-1944 it was one of the official check points for the Demarcation line.

== Administration ==
List of Successive Mayors

From	To	Name
	1995	Georges Vandesande
1995	2001	Guillaume Defarge
2001	2020	André Cassou
2020	2026	Gilles Leveque

Georges Vandesande sponsored the candidacy of Jacques Cheminade in the presidential election of 1995.

=== Inter-communality ===
Argagnon belongs to five inter-communal structures:

- the Communauté de communes de Lacq-Orthez;
- the AEP association of Gave and Baïse;
- the energy association of Pyrénées-Atlantiques;
- the inter-communal association of Arthez-de-Béarn;
- the inter-communal association of defence against floods from the Gave de Pau.

== Demography ==
The inhabitants of the commune are known as Argagnonais or Argagnonaises in French.

Historical population

Year	Pop.	±% p.a.
1793	212	—
1821	227	+0.24%
1846	366	+1.93%
1872	457	+0.86%
1901	415	−0.33%
1926	408	−0.07%
1946	309	−1.38%
1962	374	+1.20%
1968	468	+3.81%

Year	Pop.	±% p.a.
1975	505	+1.09%
1982	501	−0.11%
1990	695	+4.18%
1999	711	+0.25%
2007	719	+0.14%
2012	729	+0.28%
2017	702	−0.75%
2023	690	−0.29%

Source: EHESS and INSEE

== Economy ==
The town is part of the Appellation d'origine contrôlée (AOC) zone designation of Ossau-iraty.

== Culture and Heritage ==
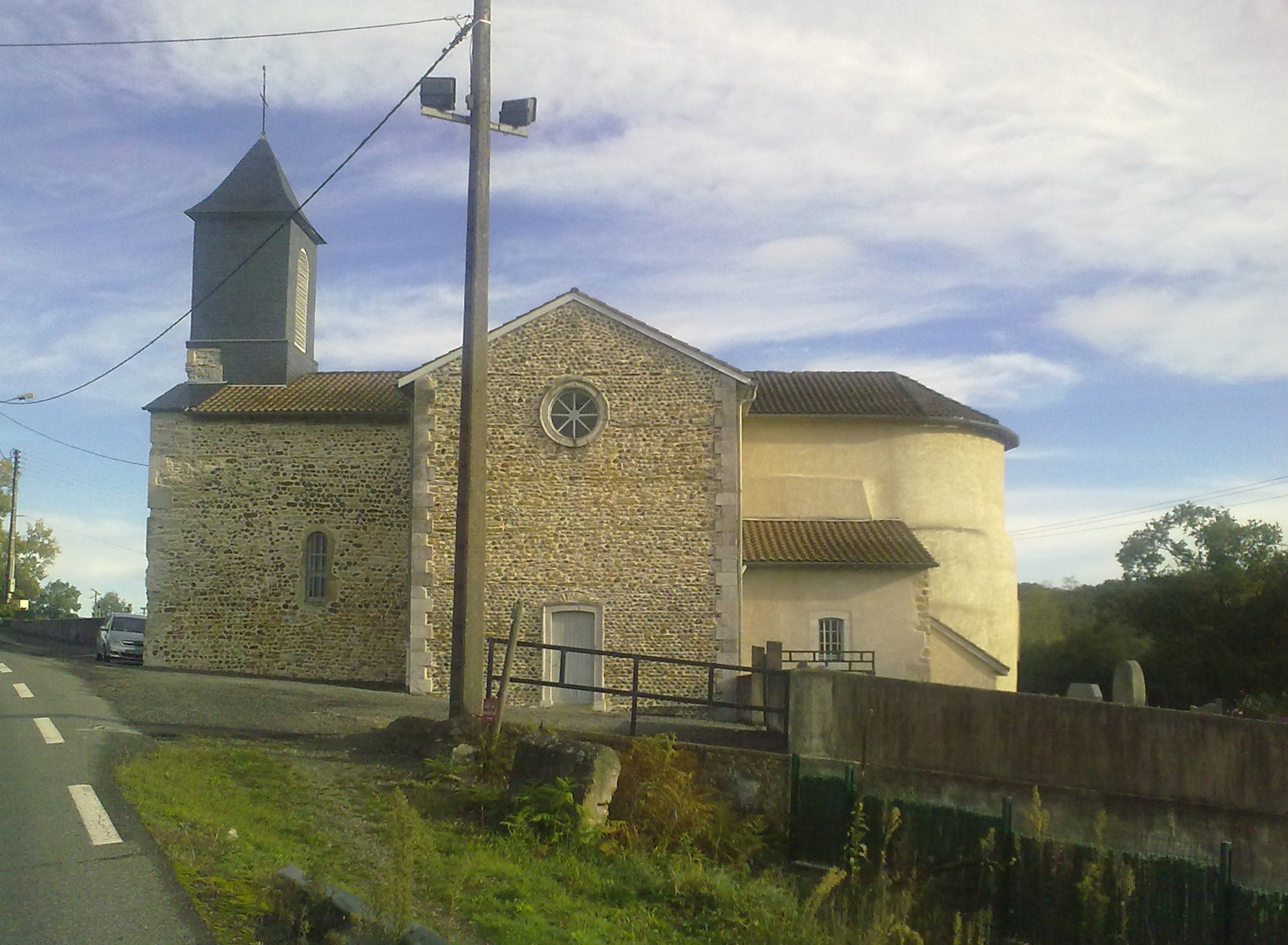
The Church of Saint-Pierre

=== Nickname and saying ===
According to Hubert Dutech, the inhabitants of Marcerin were called perautucs, meaning "fools". He also cited the saying A Marcerin, n'i a glèisa ni mouli, mes que i a ua houratèra, oun lou diable apèra, which means "In Marcerin there is neither church nor mill, but there is a small cave where the devil calls".

=== Civil heritage ===
Several Prehistoric camps have been found in the commune, reflecting its ancient past. The most important of them is the Turoû de Dous Garos at 90 metres altitude. Ditches surround it and there are three earthen ramparts. Remains from the Iron Age have been discovered. The park of the current chateau is located in the former castéra.

=== Religious heritage ===
The Church of Saint-Pierre (11th century) is registered as an historical monument. It was built in 1866 on remains from the 11th century.

== Facilities ==
Argagnon has a primary school.

== Notable people linked to the commune ==
- Raymond Larrabure, born in 1797 in Saint-Jean-Pied-de-Port and died in 1875 in Argagnon, was a French politician.
- Henry de Pène, born in 1830 in Paris and died in 1888 in the same city, was a French writer and journalist. Henry de Pène was also called Henry de Pène of Argagnon - after the castle owned by his father at Argagnon.
- Robert Sarrabère, born in 1926 in Argagnon was a French Catholic bishop of Aire and Dax until his retirement in 2002. From 9 January to 2 September 2007, he served the diocese of Montauban as Apostolic Administrator during the period of transition from one bishop to another.

== See also ==
- Communes of the Pyrénées-Atlantiques department
