= Autevielle-Saint-Martin-Bideren =

- Commune
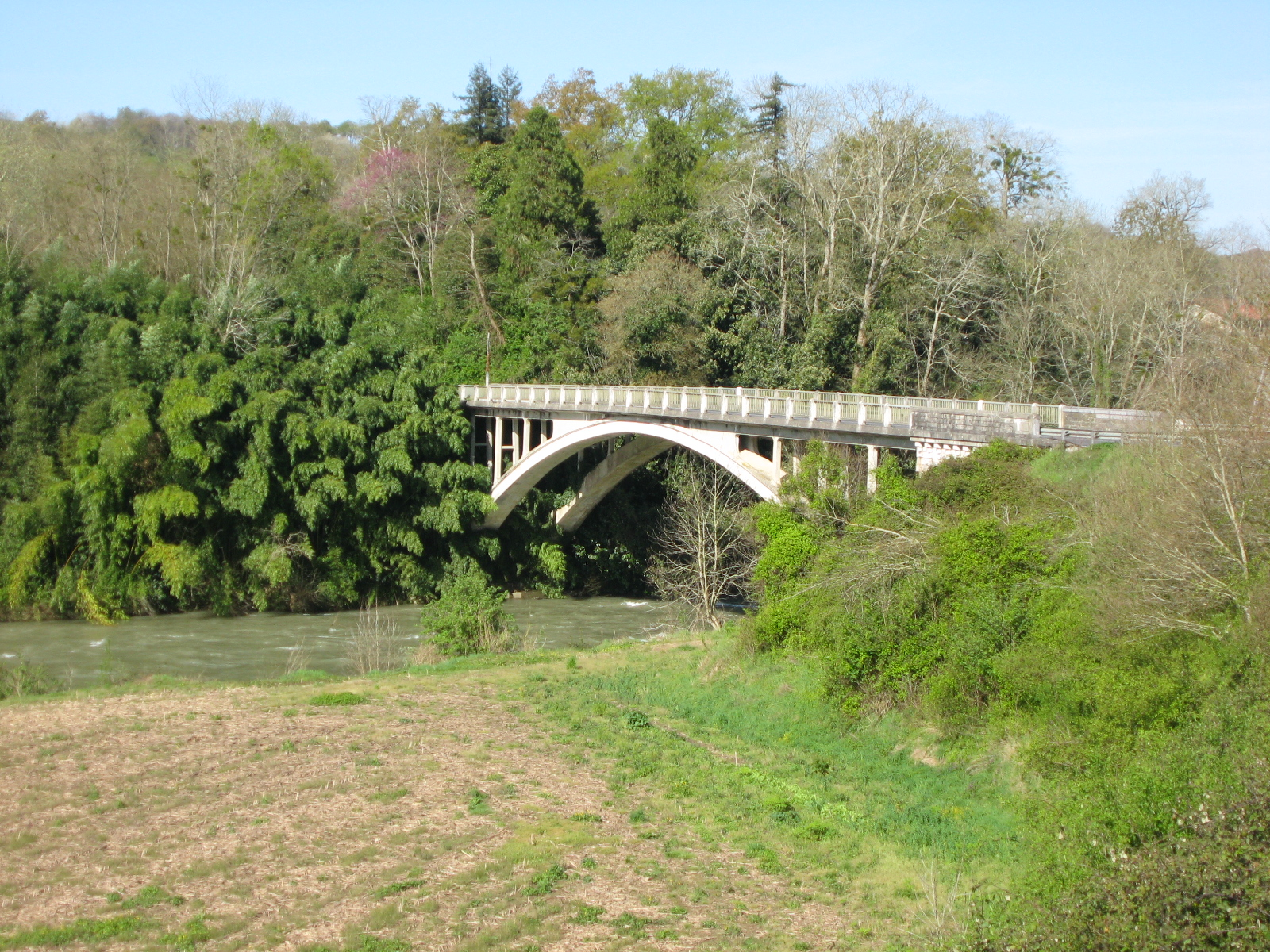
- The Saison river in Autevielle
- Location of Autevielle-Saint-Martin-Bideren
- Location within France Location within Nouvelle-Aquitaine
- Coordinates: 43°23′29″N 0°58′15″W
- Country: France
- Region: Nouvelle-Aquitaine
- Department: Pyrénées-Atlantiques
- Arrondissement: Oloron-Sainte-Marie
- Canton: Orthez et Terres des Gaves et du Sel
- Intercommunality: CC Béarn Gaves

Government
  - Mayor (2022–2026): Jérôme Milhet
- Area^{1}: 6 km^{2} (2.3 sq mi)
- Elevation: 65 m (213 ft)
- Highest elevation: 197 m (646 ft)
- Lowest elevation: 37 m (121 ft)
- Population (2023): 219
  - Density: 36/km^{2} (95/sq mi)
- Time zone: UTC+01:00 (CET)
  - Summer (DST): UTC+02:00 (CEST)
- INSEE/Postal code: 64083 /64390
- ^{1} French Land Register data, which excludes lakes, ponds, glaciers > 1 km^{2} (0.386 sq mi or 247 acres) and river estuaries.

Autevielle-Saint-Martin-Bideren (French pronunciation: [otvjɛl sɛ̃ maʁtɛ̃ bidʁɛ̃]; Occitan: Autivièla, Sent Martin e Vidèren; Basque: Autile) is a commune in the Pyrénées-Atlantiques department in the Nouvelle-Aquitaine region of south-western France.

== Geography ==
Autevielle-Saint-Martin-Bideren is located some 20 km south-west of Orthez and 9 km north-east of Saint-Palais. Access to the commune is by road D936 from Abitain in the north which passes through the length of the commune and the village then continues east. The D246 goes west from the village to join the D134 west of the commune. The D140 goes south from the village to Osserain-Rivareyte. The west of the commune is mostly forest while the east is mostly farmland.

The Gave d'Oloron forms the north-western border of the commune as it flows north-west to join the Gave de Pau forming the Gaves réunis at Peyrehorade. The Saison flows through the commune from the south-west and joins the Gave d'Oloron on the north-western border.

=== Places and hamlets ===
- Arrécot
- Autevielle
- Les Bains
- Barthou
- Bideren
- Le Bosc
- Le Camou
- Les Campagnes
- Le Château
- Les Gats
- Gerberu
- Hau
- Héouga
- Hyeyte
- L’Île
- Labie
- Laborde
- Lagouardette
- Les Partilles
- Petit
- Saint-Martin

== Toponymy ==
The name Autevielle in béarnais is Autivièla.

The name Bideren in béarnais is Vidèren.

For the name Autevielle Michel Grosclaude proposed two Latin origins: alta villa ("high town") or Altina villa ("Domain of Altinus").

For the name Bideren Michel Grosclaude proposed a probable origin of the man's name Vital with the gascon suffix -enh.

For the name Saint-Martin Michel Grosclaude indicated that it undoubtedly came from the Bishop of Tours - Martin of Tours.

The following table details the origins of the commune name and other names in the commune.

Name	Spelling	Date	Source	Page	Origin	Description
Autevielle	Autebiele	1379	Raymond	17	Chapter	Village
	Autebiele	1385	Grosclaude		Census	
	Lo passadge d'Autebielle	1442	Raymond	17	Contracts	
	Le pont d'Autabiela	1542	Raymond	17	Reformation	
	Autavielle	1546	Raymond	17	Reformation	
	Authevielle	1728	Raymond	17	Denombrement	
	Hautevielle	1750	Cassini			
Bideren	Lo pont de Bideren	1342	Raymond	31	Bayonne	Village
	Videren	1385	Raymond	31	Census	
	Saint-Jacques de Biderein	1674	Raymond	31	Insinuations	
	Bidezen	1793	EHESS	31		
	Bideren	1750	Cassini			
	Bidéren	1863	Raymond	31		
Saint-Martin	Sent-Marti	1376	Raymond	150	Military	Village
	Sent-Marthin	1379	Raymond	150	Béarn	
	Sent-Marthii de Garanhoo	1385	Raymond	150	Census	
Barrailla	Barrailla	1863	Raymond	21		Spring of mineral water
Castéra	La mota aperade lo Casteras	1547	Raymond	44	Bearn	Motte-and-bailey castle on the border of Bearn and Mixe country
	Castéra	1863	Raymond	44		
Haubis	Haubis	1863	Raymond	76		Place
Hyeyte	la Hüte de Sent-Marthii	1385	Raymond	78	Census	Farm
	La Fieyta de Sanct-Martii, Lafiite, la Hieyta	1538	Raymond	78	Reformation	
	La Fieyte	1546	Raymond	78	Reformation	
	La Hiete	1588	Raymond	78	Reformation	
	La Hiette	1863	Raymond	78		
Nolivos	Noliboos	1544	Raymond	123	Béarn	Farm

Sources:

- Raymond: Topographic Dictionary of the Department of Basses-Pyrenees, 1863, on the page numbers indicated in the table. (in French)
- Grosclaude: Toponymic Dictionary of communes, Béarn, 2006 (in French)
- Cassini: Cassini Map from 1750
- EHESS: Bideren page on the EHESS Cassini website

Origins:

- Chapter: Chapter of Autevielle
- Census: Census of Béarn
- Contracts: Contracts retained by Carresse, Notary of Béarn
- Reformation: Reformation of Béarn
- Denombrement: Denombremont of Gassion
- Bayonne: Titles of the Chapter of Bayonne
- Insinuations: Insinuations of the Diocese of Oloron
- Military: Military Inspection of Béarn
- Béarn: Titles of the Viscounts of Béarn

== History ==
Paul Raymond noted that in 1385 Autevielle and Saint-Martin together had 11 fires with 8 fires at Bideren. They depended on the bailiwick of Sauveterre.

The communes of Autevielle, Saint-Martin, and Bideren merged on 18 April 1842.

== Administration ==
List of successive Mayors of Autevielle-Saint-Martin-Bideren
In office		Name	Party
1989	2014	Fernand Lavigne	UMP
2014	2022	Patrick Balesta	
2022	incumbent	Jérôme Milhet	

=== Inter-communality ===
The commune is part of six inter-communal structures:

- the Communauté de communes du Béarn des Gaves;
- the inter-communal social action centre of Sauveterre-de-Béarn;
- the SIGOM;
- the Energy association of Pyrénées-Atlantiques;
- the inter-communal association for the management of drinking water from the Saleys and the Gaves;
- the inter-communal association of the Gaves and the Saleys;

== Demography ==
The population data given in the table and graph below include the former communes of Saint-Martin and Bideren, absorbed in 1842.

Historical population

Year	Pop.	±% p.a.
1793	364	—
1821	404	+0.37%
1846	400	−0.04%
1872	323	−0.82%
1901	375	+0.52%
1926	320	−0.63%
1946	272	−0.81%
1962	204	−1.78%
1968	177	−2.34%

Year	Pop.	±% p.a.
1975	164	−1.08%
1982	164	+0.00%
1990	205	+2.83%
1999	121	−5.69%
2007	144	+2.20%
2012	212	+8.04%
2017	205	−0.67%
2023	219	+1.11%

Source: EHESS and INSEE

== Economy ==
Economic activity is mainly agricultural. The commune is part of the Appellation d'origine contrôlée (AOC) zone of Ossau-iraty.

== Culture and heritage ==
=== Religious heritage ===
The commune has one religious building that is registered as an historical monument:

- The Parish Church of Saint Martin (1896)

== See also ==
- Communes of the Pyrénées-Atlantiques department
