= Baleix =

- Commune
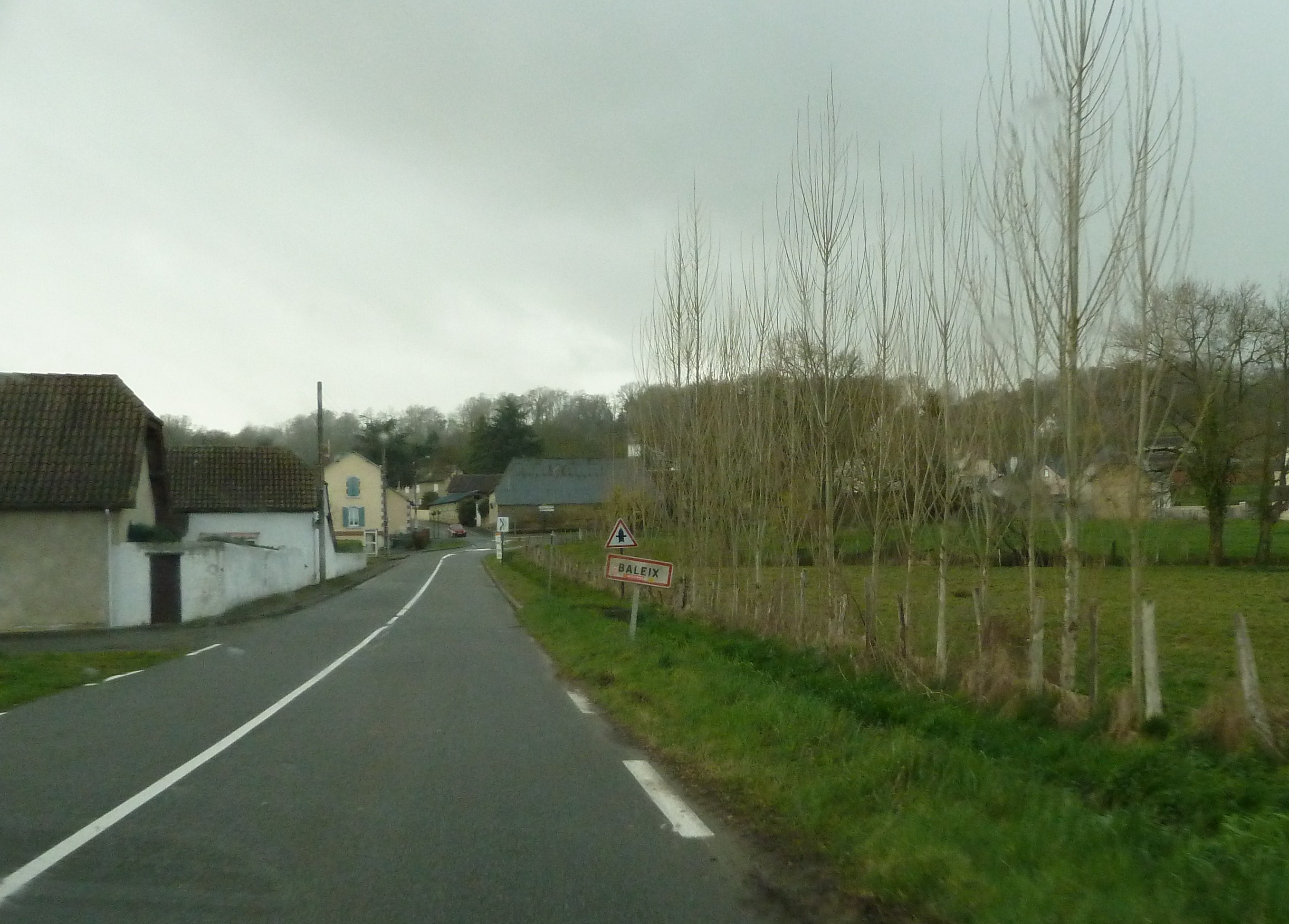
- The road into Baleix
- Location of Baleix
- Location within France Location within Nouvelle-Aquitaine
- Coordinates: 43°22′45″N 0°07′43″W
- Country: France
- Region: Nouvelle-Aquitaine
- Department: Pyrénées-Atlantiques
- Arrondissement: Pau
- Canton: Pays de Morlaàs et du Montanérès

Government
  - Mayor (2020–2026): Vincent Roustaa
- Area^{1}: 6.47 km^{2} (2.50 sq mi)
- Elevation: 230 m (750 ft)
- Highest elevation: 354 m (1,161 ft)
- Lowest elevation: 225 m (738 ft)
- Population (2023): 126
  - Density: 19.5/km^{2} (50.4/sq mi)
- Time zone: UTC+01:00 (CET)
  - Summer (DST): UTC+02:00 (CEST)
- INSEE/Postal code: 64089 /64460
- ^{1} French Land Register data, which excludes lakes, ponds, glaciers > 1 km^{2} (0.386 sq mi or 247 acres) and river estuaries.

Baleix is a commune of the Pyrénées-Atlantiques department in the Nouvelle-Aquitaine region of south-western France.

== Geography ==
Baleix is located in the Montanérès overlooking the Lées Valley some 26 km north-east of Pau and 10 km south of Lembeye. Access to the commune is by the D7 road from Saint-Jammes in the west which passes through the length of the commune and the village and continues east to Casteide-Doat. The D145 comes from Lespourcy in the south-west and passes through the village to continue north to Anoye. Apart from the village there is also the hamlet of Tisné north-east of the village. The commune is mostly farmland with a few scattered small forests.

The Lées flows through the east of the commune from the south and continues north to join the Adour near Aire-sur-l'Adour. The Petit Lées comes from the south and flows north-east through the commune to join the Lées.

=== Places and hamlets ===
- Balespouey
- Baradat
- Berbouly
- Capcazaux
- Capsus (land)
- Castille
- La Caussade
- Clos
- Dujardin
- Guilhas
- Hourpelat
- Jeandavid
- Jouanolou
- La Moulère
- Noau
- Pucheu
- Puyo
- Sarthou
- Tisné
- Trémoulets
- Vignau

=== Neighbouring communes and villages ===
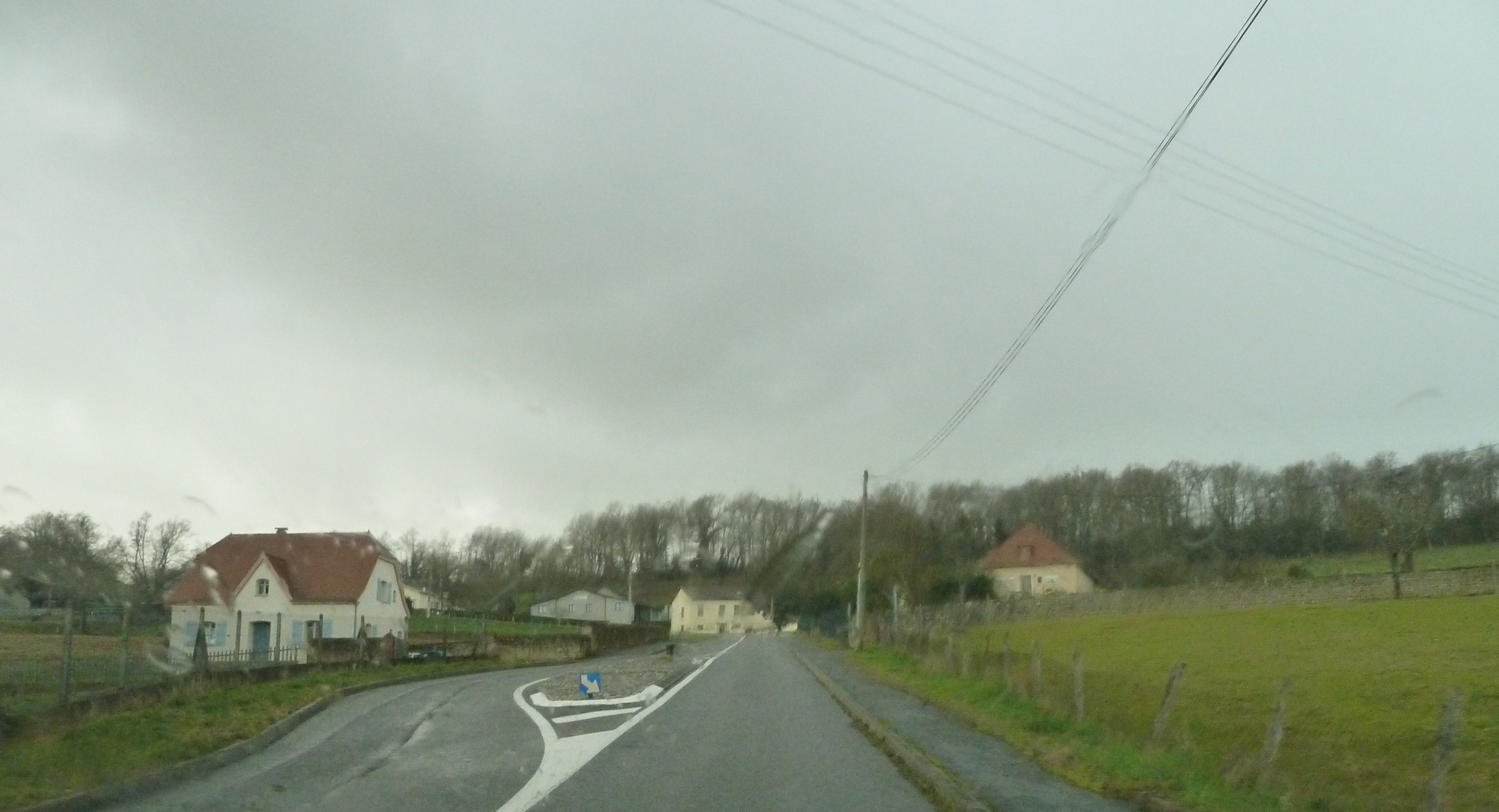
Baleix Village

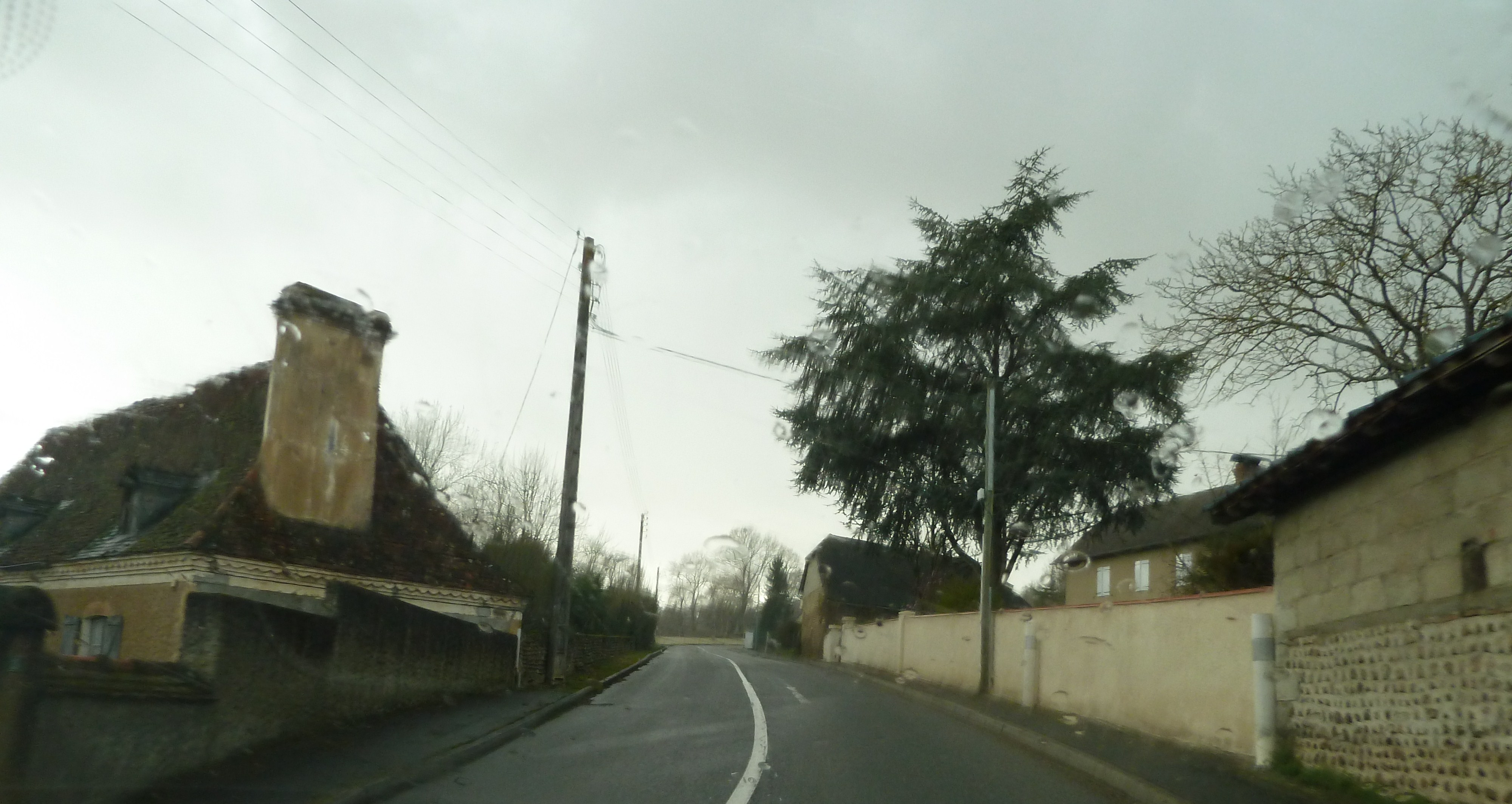
In Baleix Village

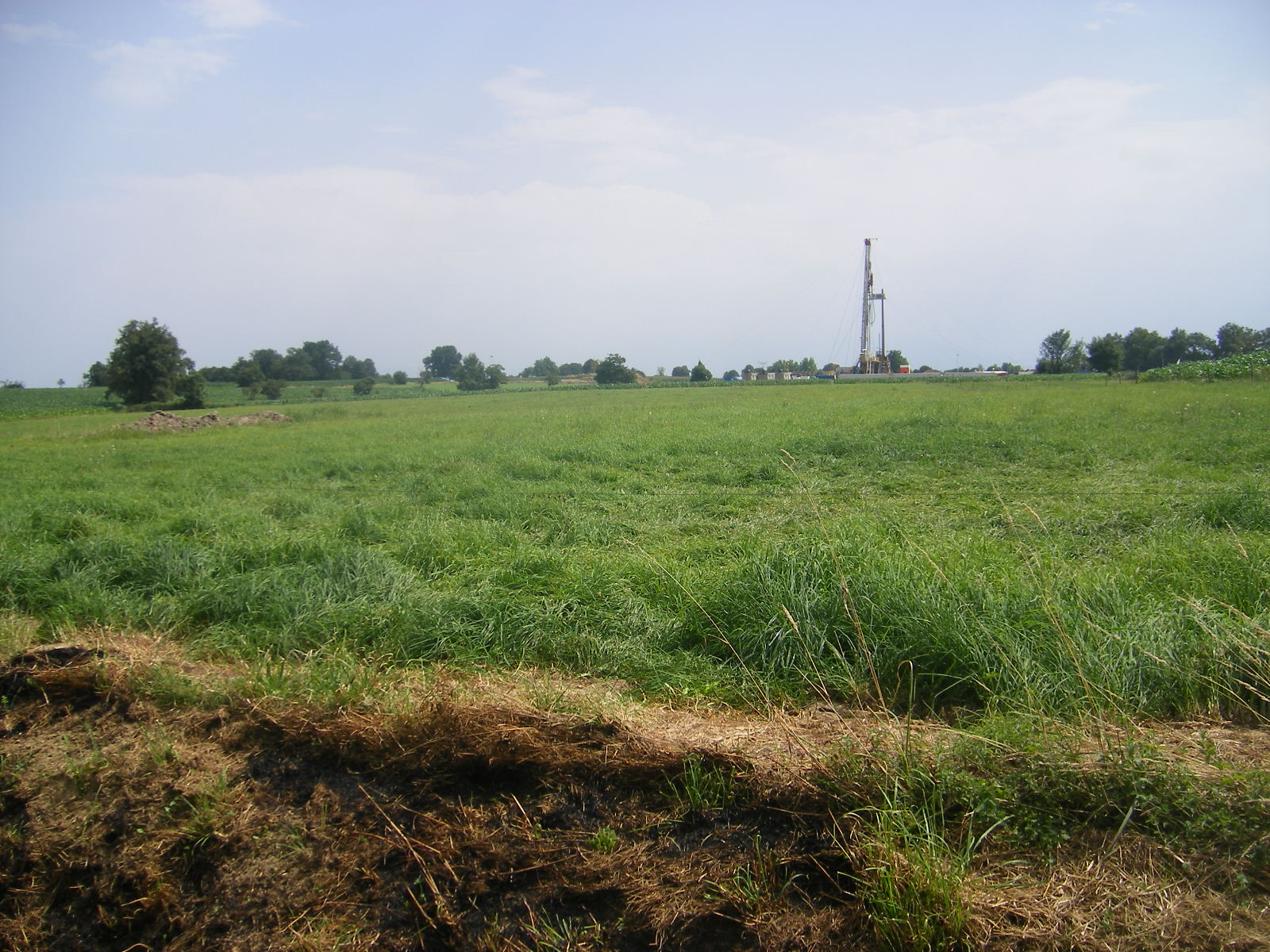
Baleix Landscape

== Toponymy ==
Michel Grosclaude said that etymologically the name comes from the Gascon Balèch meaning "plateau".

The following table details the origins of the commune name and other names in the commune.

Name	Spelling	Date	Source	Page	Origin	Description
Baleix	Bales	11th century	Raymond	20	Lescar	Village
	Balas	12th century	Raymond	20	Marca	
	Balestoos	13th century	Raymond	20	Fors de Béarn	
	Baleixs	1385	Raymond	20	Census	
	Balesie	1402	Raymond	20	Census	
	Baleyxs	1538	Raymond	20	Reformation	
	Balechs	1538	Raymond	20	Reformation	
	Balex	1548	Raymond	20	Reformation	
	Baleix	1750	Cassini			
Abarades	Abarades	1863	Raymond	1		Place
Abats	Abats	1863	Raymond	1		Place
Les Artics	Les Articqs	1769	Raymond	14	Terrier	Place
La Bielle	La Bielle	1863	Raymond	31		Place
La Haille	Hailhe	1769	Raymond	74	Terrier	Place
La Lanusse	La Lanusse	1863	Raymond	93		Place
Peyreblanque	Peyreblanque	1863	Raymond	134		Place
Le Pimi	Lou Pimy	1769	Raymond	135	Terrier	Hamlet
Les Plagnius	Plagniux	1769	Raymond	136	Terrier	Place
	Le Plagniu	1769	Raymond	136	Terrier	
Raguette	Raguet	1769	Raymond	141	Terrier	Place
Trémoulets	Le Trémoulet	1863	Raymond	168		Place
Le Turocq de Naudy	Le Turocq de Naudy	1769	Raymond	169	Terrier	Place
La Turrecolle	La Turequolle	1769	Raymond	170	Terrier	Place
La Vignasse	La Vignasse	1863	Raymond	174		Place

Sources:

- Raymond: Topographic Dictionary of the Department of Basses-Pyrenees, 1863, on the page numbers indicated in the table. (in French)
- Grosclaude: Toponymic Dictionary of communes, Béarn, 2006 (in French)
- Cassini: Cassini Map from 1750

Origins:

- Lescar: Cartulary of Lescar
- Marca: Pierre de Marca, History of Béarn.
- Fors de Béarn
- Census: Census of Béarn
- Terrier: The Terrier of Baleix.

== History ==
Paul Raymond noted on page 20 of his 1863 dictionary that in 1385 there were 22 fires and it depended on the bailiwick of Pau. Baleix fief was subject to the Viscounts of Béarn.

The commune has long been occupied as evidenced by the discovery of a fortified camp surrounded by a moat with visible remains of earthworks.

During the medieval period the commune was a member of the Commandery of the Order of Malta of Caubin and Morlaàs.

== Administration ==
List of Successive Mayors

From	To	Name
1995	2001	Jean Balespouey
2001	2008	Gérard Balespouey
2008	2026	Vincent Roustaa

=== Inter-communality ===
The commune is part of four inter-communal structures:

- the Communauté de communes du Nord-Est Béarn;
- the SIVOM of the Canton of Montaner;
- the Energy association of Pyrénées-Atlantiques;
- the inter-communal association for the supply of drinking water Luy-Gabas-Lees;

== Demography ==
The inhabitants of the commune are known as Baleichois or Baleichoises in French.

Historical population

Year	Pop.	±% p.a.
1793	301	—
1821	358	+0.62%
1846	450	+0.92%
1872	372	−0.73%
1901	280	−0.97%
1926	201	−1.32%
1946	158	−1.20%
1962	152	−0.24%
1968	141	−1.24%

Year	Pop.	±% p.a.
1975	150	+0.89%
1982	126	−2.46%
1990	122	−0.40%
1999	120	−0.18%
2007	123	+0.31%
2012	147	+3.63%
2017	143	−0.55%
2023	126	−2.09%

Source: EHESS and INSEE

== Culture and heritage ==
=== Civil heritage ===
The commune has a number of buildings and structures that are registered as historical monuments:

- A Farmhouse at Sarthou (18th century)
- A House at Jean David (18th century)
- A House at Castille (1623)
- The Bourdallé House (18th century)
- The Coulomé Farmhouse (1789)
- The Bélengou House (18th century)
- The Arnautou House at Clos (19th century)
- Houses and Farms (17th-19th century)

=== Religious heritage ===
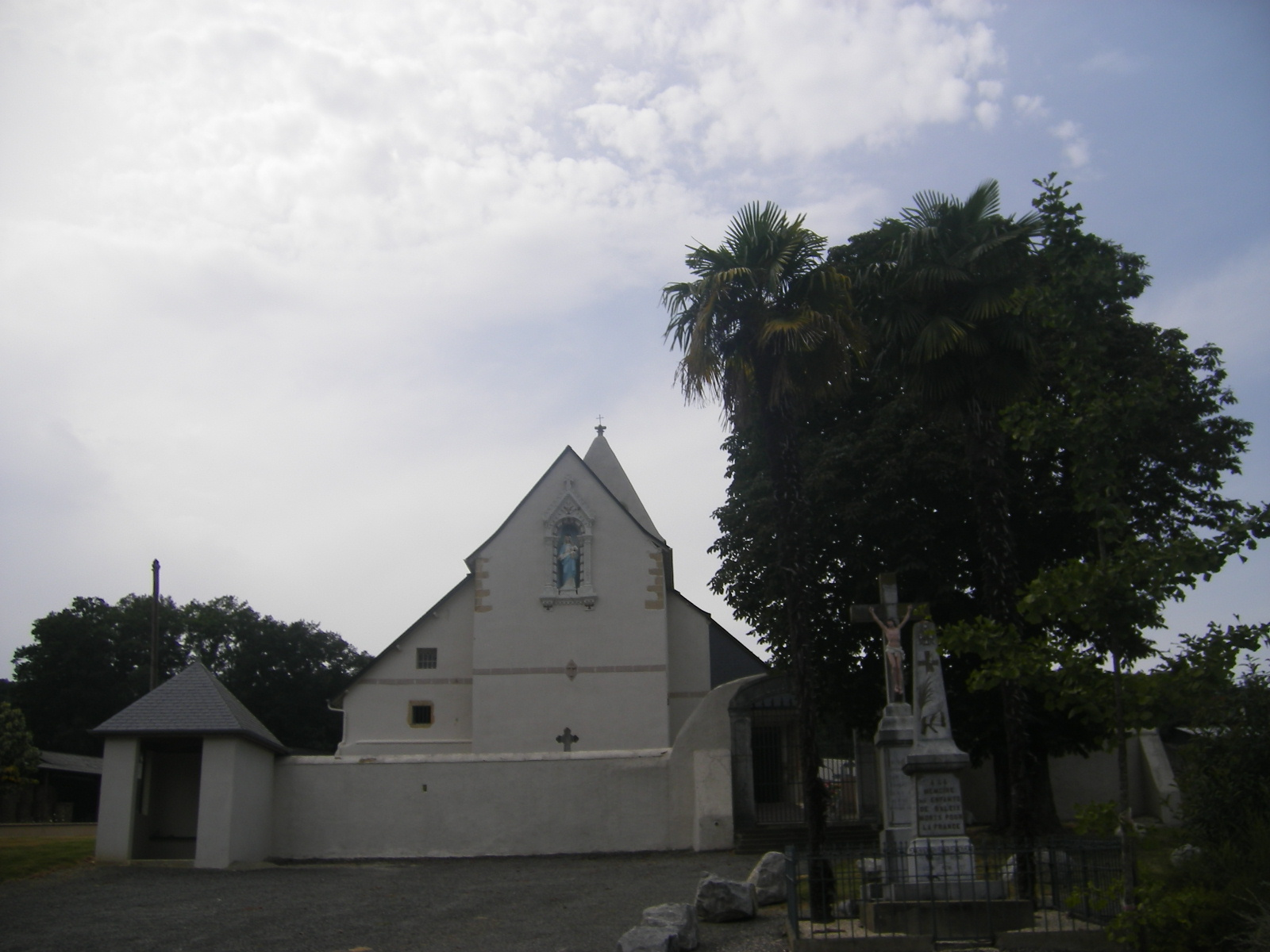
The Church of Saint-Martin

- The Parish Church of Saint-Martin (12th century) is registered as an historical monument. The Church contains a very large number of items that are registered as historical objects.

== See also ==
- Communes of the Pyrénées-Atlantiques department

=== Bibliography ===
- Archaeological Map of Gaul, Archaeological pre-inventory published under the responsibility of Michel Provost, Pyrénées-Atlantiques
