= Oraàs =

- Commune
- Location of Oraàs
- Location within France Location within Nouvelle-Aquitaine
- Coordinates: 43°26′17″N 0°59′15″W
- Country: France
- Region: Nouvelle-Aquitaine
- Department: Pyrénées-Atlantiques
- Arrondissement: Oloron-Sainte-Marie
- Canton: Orthez et Terres des Gaves et du Sel
- Intercommunality: Béarn des Gaves

Government
  - Mayor (2020–2026): Guy Touzaa
- Area^{1}: 10.57 km^{2} (4.08 sq mi)
- Elevation: 65 m (213 ft)
- Highest elevation: 172 m (564 ft)
- Lowest elevation: 27 m (89 ft)
- Population (2023): 184
  - Density: 17.4/km^{2} (45.1/sq mi)
- Time zone: UTC+01:00 (CET)
  - Summer (DST): UTC+02:00 (CEST)
- INSEE/Postal code: 64423 /64390
- ^{1} French Land Register data, which excludes lakes, ponds, glaciers > 1 km^{2} (0.386 sq mi or 247 acres) and river estuaries.

Oraàs (French pronunciation: [ɔʁas]; Occitan: Aràs) is a commune in the Pyrénées-Atlantiques department in south-western France.

== See also ==
- Communes of the Pyrénées-Atlantiques department
