= Maspie-Lalonquère-Juillacq =

- Commune
- Location of Maspie-Lalonquère-Juillacq
- Location within France Location within Nouvelle-Aquitaine
- Coordinates: 43°25′26″N 0°08′51″W
- Country: France
- Region: Nouvelle-Aquitaine
- Department: Pyrénées-Atlantiques
- Arrondissement: Pau
- Canton: Terres des Luys et Coteaux du Vic-Bilh
- Intercommunality: Nord-Est Béarn

Government
  - Mayor (2020–2026): Eliane Capdevielle
- Area^{1}: 10.76 km^{2} (4.15 sq mi)
- Elevation: 215 m (705 ft)
- Highest elevation: 336 m (1,102 ft)
- Lowest elevation: 179 m (587 ft)
- Population (2023): 233
  - Density: 21.7/km^{2} (56.1/sq mi)
- Time zone: UTC+01:00 (CET)
  - Summer (DST): UTC+02:00 (CEST)
- INSEE/Postal code: 64369 /64350
- ^{1} French Land Register data, which excludes lakes, ponds, glaciers > 1 km^{2} (0.386 sq mi or 247 acres) and river estuaries.

Maspie-Lalonquère-Juillacq (French pronunciation: [maspi lalɔ̃kɛʁ ʒɥijak]; Occitan: Maspièr, la Lonquèra e Julhac) is a commune in the Pyrénées-Atlantiques department in south-western France.

== See also ==
- Communes of the Pyrénées-Atlantiques department
