= Samsons-Lion =

- Commune
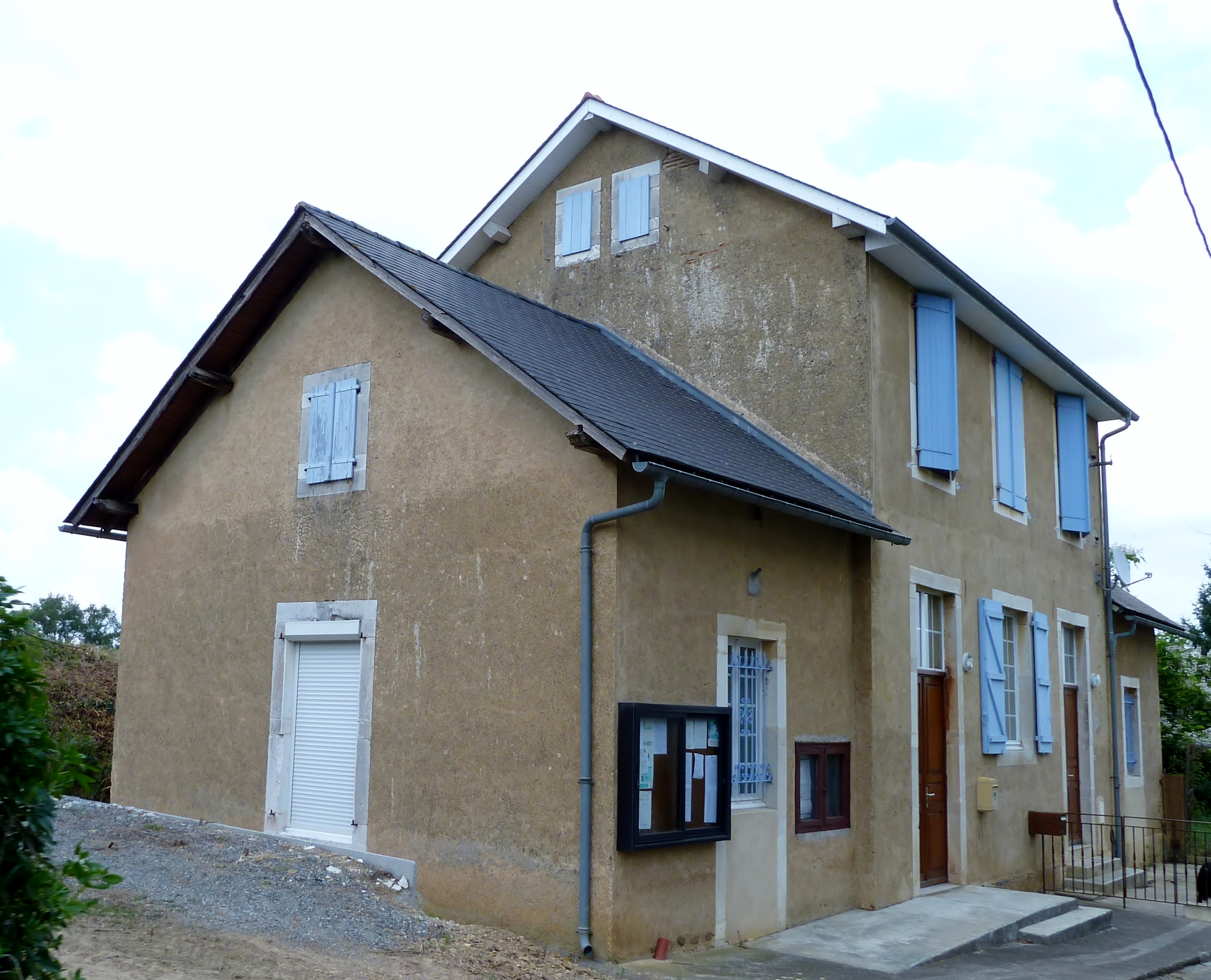
- The town hall of Samsons-Lion
- Location of Samsons-Lion
- Location within France Location within Nouvelle-Aquitaine
- Coordinates: 43°26′06″N 0°07′08″W
- Country: France
- Region: Nouvelle-Aquitaine
- Department: Pyrénées-Atlantiques
- Arrondissement: Pau
- Canton: Terres des Luys et Coteaux du Vic-Bilh

Government
  - Mayor (2020–2026): Philippe Castets
- Area^{1}: 5.03 km^{2} (1.94 sq mi)
- Elevation: 264 m (866 ft)
- Highest elevation: 331 m (1,086 ft)
- Lowest elevation: 181 m (594 ft)
- Population (2023): 99
  - Density: 20/km^{2} (51/sq mi)
- Time zone: UTC+01:00 (CET)
  - Summer (DST): UTC+02:00 (CEST)
- INSEE/Postal code: 64503 /64350
- ^{1} French Land Register data, which excludes lakes, ponds, glaciers > 1 km^{2} (0.386 sq mi or 247 acres) and river estuaries.

Samsons-Lion is a commune in the Pyrénées-Atlantiques department in south-western France.

== See also ==
- Communes of the Pyrénées-Atlantiques department
