= Arthez-de-Béarn =

- Commune
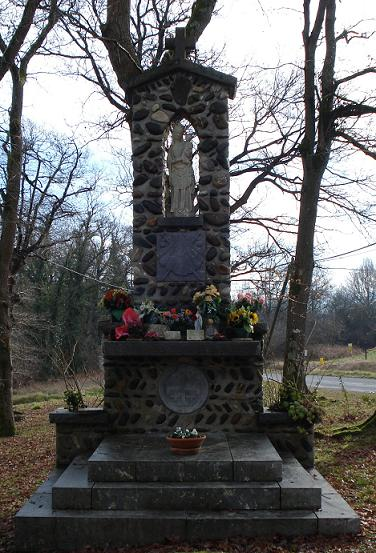
- The oratory of Caubin

- Coat of arms
- Location of Arthez-de-Béarn
- Location within France Location within Nouvelle-Aquitaine
- Coordinates: 43°27′56″N 0°36′52″W
- Country: France
- Region: Nouvelle-Aquitaine
- Department: Pyrénées-Atlantiques
- Arrondissement: Pau
- Canton: Artix et Pays de Soubestre
- Intercommunality: CC Lacq-Orthez

Government
  - Mayor (2020–2026): Jean-Pierre Escouteloup
- Area^{1}: 27.92 km^{2} (10.78 sq mi)
- Elevation: 207 m (679 ft)
- Highest elevation: 231 m (758 ft)
- Lowest elevation: 92 m (302 ft)
- Population (2023): 1,837
  - Density: 65.80/km^{2} (170.4/sq mi)
- Time zone: UTC+01:00 (CET)
  - Summer (DST): UTC+02:00 (CEST)
- INSEE/Postal code: 64057 /64370
- ^{1} French Land Register data, which excludes lakes, ponds, glaciers > 1 km^{2} (0.386 sq mi or 247 acres) and river estuaries.

Arthez-de-Béarn (French pronunciation: [aʁtɛz də beaʁn], literally Arthez of Béarn; Gascon: Artés) is a commune in the Pyrénées-Atlantiques department in southwestern France.

It took its name from the county of Artois (Artés in Occitan, adapted in French as Arthès or Arthez) like three other communes of France (Arthez-d'Asson, Arthez-d'Armagnac, and Arthès).

In 1950, -de-Béarn was added to its name to differentiate it from the other Arthès.

== International relations ==
The commune is twinned with:

- Bogen, Bavaria, Germany
- Biescas, Aragon, Spain
- Olite, Navarre, Spain

== See also ==
- Communes of the Pyrénées-Atlantiques department
