= Brigitte Jobbé-Duval =

French historian and linguist

Brigitte Jobbé-Duval is a French historian and linguist. Her works include Paris Chrétien en 600 Questions (1997), Le Livre des Porte-Bonheur (2009), Dictionnaire des Noms de Lieux des Pyrénées-Atlantiques (2009), and Souvenirs de la Vie Quotidienne 1939-1945 (2010) (cowritten).
