= Feu fiscal =

The term "feu" (French for "fire" from the Latin focus meaning hearth) meant, especially in the Middle Ages, the hearth, first in the strict sense (the place where the fire burns) and figuratively: the family home (cf. the expression "without fire or place") or the family itself. Very quickly, it was used as the basic unit for assessment, calculation, and collection of tax and it was called the "feu fiscal" meaning "fire tax".

== Use of taxes in the Middle Ages ==
For tax allocation, the principle was to divide the total amount required to be collected by the number of fires, which necessitated a census of fires which was called "réel". The task was relatively simple to perform to the level of an urban district, however it took on a whole different scale in a rural area or across a kingdom. Thus, the king of France only made a single fire census in his territory – in 1328. Yet the result was incomplete as it excluded the great fiefs (e.g. Guyenne and Flanders) and some Appanages. In addition, it became quickly outdated due to the Black Death. In 1426, the duke of Brittany made a "reformation of taxes" to limit exemptions (noble families had to prove their nobility) in all the provinces.

There were no records of fires by urban community or territorial division (bailliage or sénéchaussée in France). Yet their accuracy should be put in perspective: the provinces did not stop asking the central government for revisions, always for reduction, due to famine or epidemic. The total number of fires was therefore subject to hard bargaining between the central government and municipalities, regardless of the reality on the ground. In addition, the poorest families were grouped at the parish level as a single fire for joint taxation. This led to rounded off counts cut off from reality.

The "feu fiscal" became a purely theoretical unit, as distinguished from the "feu allumant" (fire lights) which corresponded to the family home. Its value varied depending on the year or on social status even within the same city. It could even be set arbitrarily. Thus, in 1426, the duke of Brittany decreed that a "fire" corresponded to three "estagiers" (heads of households).

The Taille roles were updated regularly during "visites de feu" (fire visits).

== Their Use and historical demography ==
The population counts were, for the most part of the "Ancien Régime", counted in fires, not real people. The French monarchy continued to focus on the counts by fire until 1726.

To estimate the number of inhabitants according to the given fires, some people applied a multiplier of 5. Thus for a population of 34 fires, 170 inhabitants are obtained. However, the conversion factor from fires to inhabitants is still under discussion among historians. The State of fires in 1328 counted 61,098 fires for Paris. The calculations on the numbers of population varied from 80,000 to 240,000 inhabitants. The coefficient of 5 was not a rule but an average indicator.

Across regions and eras, the multiplier varied. Serge Dontenwill: for the current department of the Loire under Louis XIV, using a coefficient of 4.5 (and following Jacques Dupâquier in his French population in the 17th and 18th centuries, PUF, 1993).

== Bibliography ==
- Robert Henri Beautier, Fires, population and social structure in the middle of the 15th century: the example of Carpentras, Annales. Economies, societies, civilizations, No. 14 (1959), p. 255-268 (in French)
- Jean Favier, Finance and Taxation in the late Middle Ages, SEDES al. "Perspectives on History", Paris, 1971 (ASIN 2718136995) (in French)
- Jean Glénisson and Élisabeth Carpentier: Balance sheets and methods: French demography in the 16th century, Annals. Economies, societies, civilizations No. 17 (1962), p. 109 (in French)
- Albert Rigaudière, Governing a town in the Middle Ages, Anthropos, coll. "History" (ISBN 2717824065),
- Albert Rigaudière, Dictionary of the Middle Ages, s. dir. Michel Zink, Alain de Libera and Claude Gauvard, PUF, coll. "Quadriga", 2004 (ISBN 2130543391)

== See also ==
- Hearth Tax
- Census
