= Estates of Navarre =

The Estates of Navarre (French: États de Navarre, États généraux de Navarre, Cortes de Navarre) were created in 1317 under Philip II. The Estates of Lower Navarre (French: États de Basse-Navarre, Cortes de la Basse-Navarre) were first called into session on 28 August 1523 by Henry II after the definitive loss of Upper Navarre,

It was created in the model of the Estates General that already existed in the court of Pamplona, the Estates General of France, and in Béarn and other provinces. The last meeting of the Estates of Lower Navarre was on 15 June 1789.

== Composition ==
The Estates of Lower Navarre was composed of deputies from the three Estates: the First Estate (clergy), the Second Estate (nobility) and the Third Estate (commoners), each deputy having one vote.

- For the First Estate, the regular clergy, the Bishop of Bayonne, the Bishop of Dax, the Dean of Saint-Jean-Pied-de-Port and the Priors of Saint-Palais, Utziate and Harambels, six persons in all. The bishops rarely appeared. The Bishop of Bayonne was represented by the Archdeacon of Pay de Cize, who was the parish priest of Saint-Jean-Pied-de-Port, and the Bishop of Dax by the Archdeacon of Pays de Mixe and the Pays d'Ostabarret, who was the parish priest of Saint-Palais;
- For the Second Estate, the nobility, was composed of all of the owners of noble properties in Lower Navarre, of which the number varied in the early modern period between 103 and 153, depending on the author. The relative number demonstrates the importance of the nobility in the small Kingdom of Lower Navarre;
- For the Third Estate, the commoners, the representation was quite complex due to the decentralized administrative structure of the country, composed of seven "lands" or valleys and five cities. Two of them, the Pays de Mixe and the combined trilogy of Armendarits-Iholdy-Irissarry designated three representatives; the others, the Pay de Cize, the Pays d’Arberoue, the Pays d'Ostabarret and the Ossès and Baïgorry Valleys nominated two; the five cities of La Bastide-Clairence, Garris, Saint-Palais, Larceveau and Saint-Jean-Pied-de-Port each designated two. The representatives of the Third Estate were all attorneys, 26 in total for the Estates of Navarre.

== Operation ==
The Estates of Navarre guaranteed that high-ranking officials of the Royal Council observed the requirements. On several occasions, the Estates filed complaints regarding the appointment of Royal Council and Chancery members. One complaint referred to the appointment of royal councillors and attorneys with no command of Basque.

A first breach of the regulations and its related grievance referred to the affaire Jean de Laforcade in 1590, following his appointment as attorney general. He hailed from Foix, so his appointment was appealed for failing to meet the birthplace and Basque language requirements. The General Courts (Estates) urged the king to remove him from office.

The Estates guaranteed up to 1624 that the language standards remained in place. The Parliament of Navarre with a seat in Pau was then established out of a merger of the Chancery and Council of Navarre with the sovereign Council of Béarn; they ceased to exist. The new parliament was then composed of a chief chairman, designated by the king, seven presiding deputies, two knights of honour, 46 councillors, two solicitors, and a general attorney.

However, in the run-up to the 1624 dissolution of the Royal Council under Louis II, a reform almost discarded the Basque language requirement citing certain edicts decreed by Henri III which made any person of his choosing eligible for appointment to an office, "without difference of birth or religion", so that the preceptive Navarrese origin was never again mandatory either. The Three Estates accepted the new ruling, while at the same time demanding that Basque be mandatory for the councillors, except for one.

Despite the centralizing drive of the French crown, the Estates still kept significant legislating powers until 1748, when a decree by Louis XV of France stripped them off. The archives of the Estates of Navarre for the period 1317–1789 are held at the Archives Départementales des Pyrénées-Atlantiques.

== See also ==
- Viscounty of Béarn
- Juntas Generales
- Parliament of Navarre
- History of the Basques
