= Ostabat-Asme =

Ostabat-Asme Izura-Azme (Basque)
- Commune
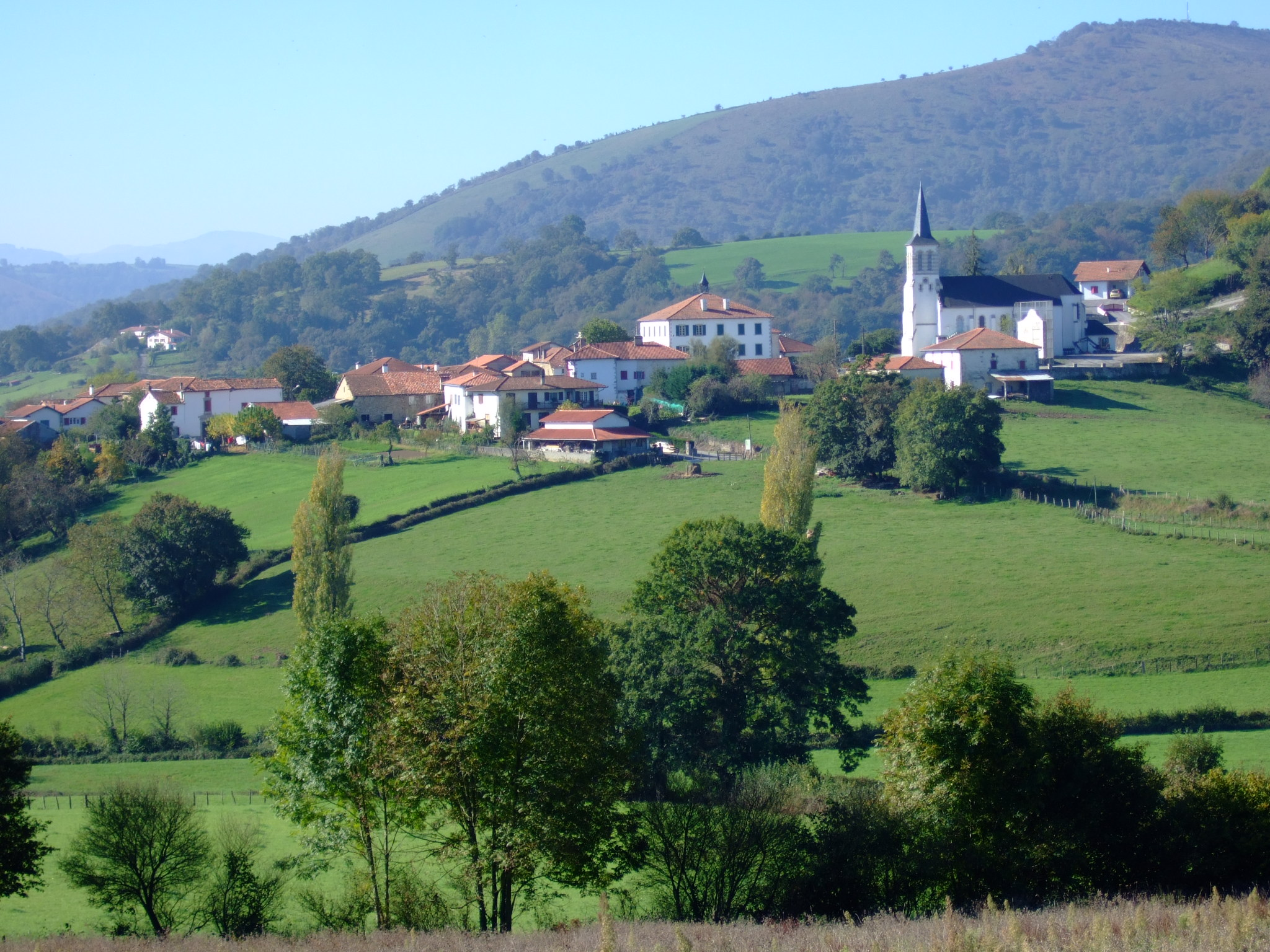
- A general view of Ostabat-Asme

- Coat of arms
- Location of Ostabat-Asme
- Location within France Location within Nouvelle-Aquitaine
- Coordinates: 43°15′24″N 1°04′11″W
- Country: France
- Region: Nouvelle-Aquitaine
- Department: Pyrénées-Atlantiques
- Arrondissement: Bayonne
- Canton: Pays de Bidache, Amikuze et Ostibarre
- Intercommunality: CA Pays Basque

Government
  - Mayor (2020–2026): Daniel Olçomendy
- Area^{1}: 15.26 km^{2} (5.89 sq mi)
- Elevation: 126 m (413 ft)
- Highest elevation: 440 m (1,440 ft)
- Lowest elevation: 66 m (217 ft)
- Population (2023): 226
  - Density: 14.8/km^{2} (38.4/sq mi)
- Time zone: UTC+01:00 (CET)
  - Summer (DST): UTC+02:00 (CEST)
- INSEE/Postal code: 64437 /64120
- ^{1} French Land Register data, which excludes lakes, ponds, glaciers > 1 km^{2} (0.386 sq mi or 247 acres) and river estuaries.

Ostabat-Asme (French pronunciation: [ɔstabat asm]; Occitan: Restèt; Basque: Izura-Azme), Hostavalem in the Middle Ages, is a commune in the Pyrénées-Atlantiques department, in south-western France. It was the meeting point of four European ways to Santiago de Compostela, three of them joining together there, namely Paris - Tours - Poitiers - Dax, from Center - Europe linking to Limoges, from Genoa and Lyon through Moissac, the fourth one the Toulouse way, linking Central Italy with the Languedoc region, the Toulouse region and linking though the Béarn region, via Lescar-Oloron to Somport, Spain, and the Spanish Pyrénées.

The 3 linked Saint James ways proceed from there, through Larceveau-Arros-Cibits, Ainhice-Mongelos, Gamarthe, Lacarre and Iriberry towards Saint-Jean-le-Vieux, (43º09'57"N, 1º11'32" W), a.k.a. Donazaharre to Saint-Jean-Pied-de-Port, and to the Spanish Frontier, Roncesvalles, (42º59'23"N, 1º20'4"W) .

It is located in the former province of Lower Navarre. It gives its name to the region of Ostabarret.

== See also ==
- Communes of the Pyrénées-Atlantiques department
