= Ainhice-Mongelos =

Ainhice-Mongelos Ainhize-Monjolose
- Commune
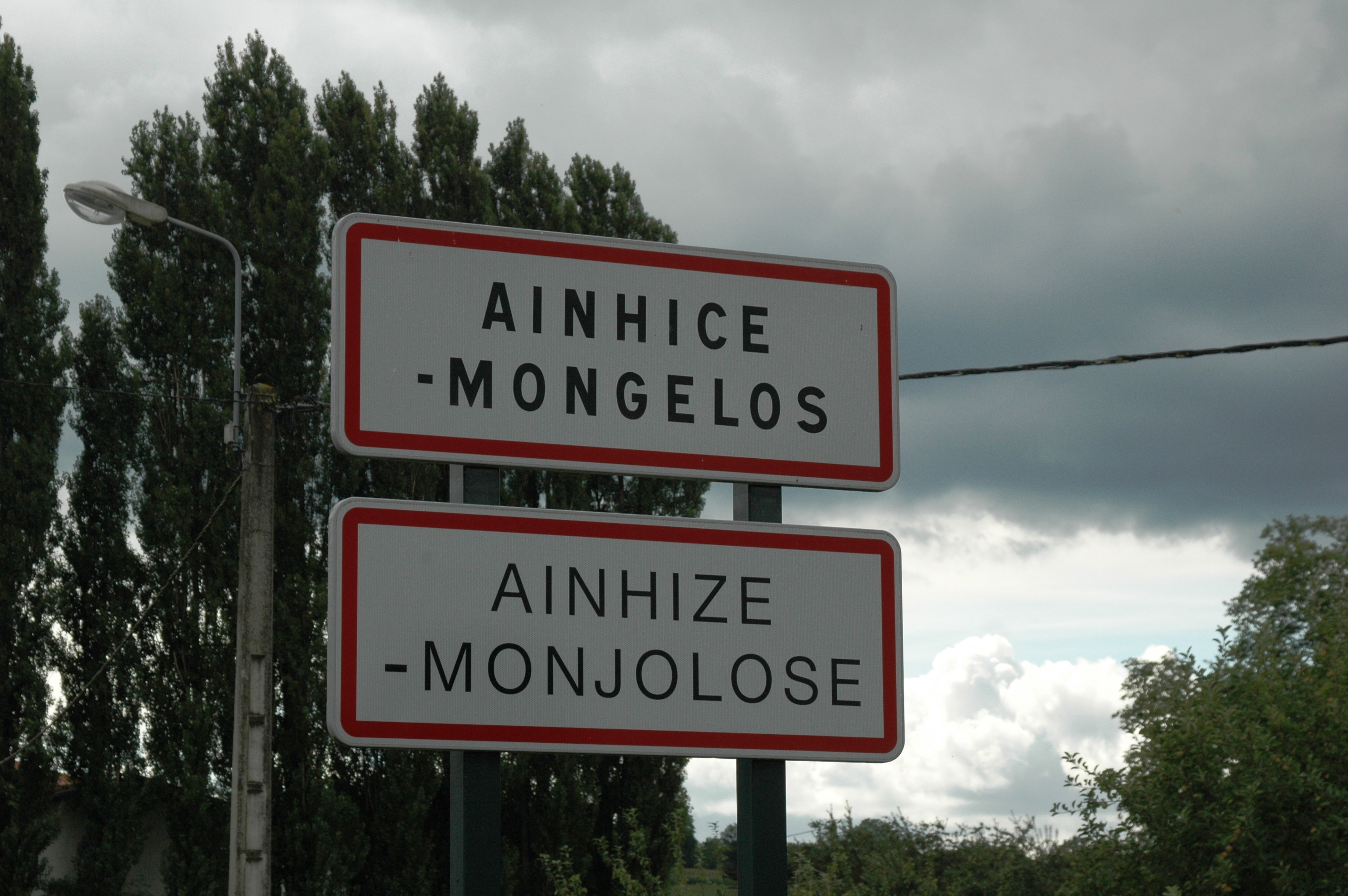
- Sign at the entrance of the village
- Location of Ainhice-Mongelos
- Location within France Location within Nouvelle-Aquitaine
- Coordinates: 43°12′22″N 1°09′15″W
- Country: France
- Region: Nouvelle-Aquitaine
- Department: Pyrénées-Atlantiques
- Arrondissement: Bayonne
- Canton: Montagne Basque
- Intercommunality: Pays Basque

Government
  - Mayor (2020–2026): Jean-Pierre Irigoin
- Area^{1}: 10.30 km^{2} (3.98 sq mi)
- Elevation: 242 m (794 ft)
- Highest elevation: 546 m (1,791 ft)
- Lowest elevation: 195 m (640 ft)
- Population (2023): 168
  - Density: 16.3/km^{2} (42.2/sq mi)
- Time zone: UTC+01:00 (CET)
  - Summer (DST): UTC+02:00 (CEST)
- INSEE/Postal code: 64013 /64220
- ^{1} French Land Register data, which excludes lakes, ponds, glaciers > 1 km^{2} (0.386 sq mi or 247 acres) and river estuaries.

Ainhice-Mongelos (Occitan: Aniça-Montgelós; Basque: Ainhize-Monjolose) is a commune in the Pyrénées-Atlantiques department in the Nouvelle-Aquitaine region in southwestern France.

It is located in the former province of Lower Navarre.

== Geography ==
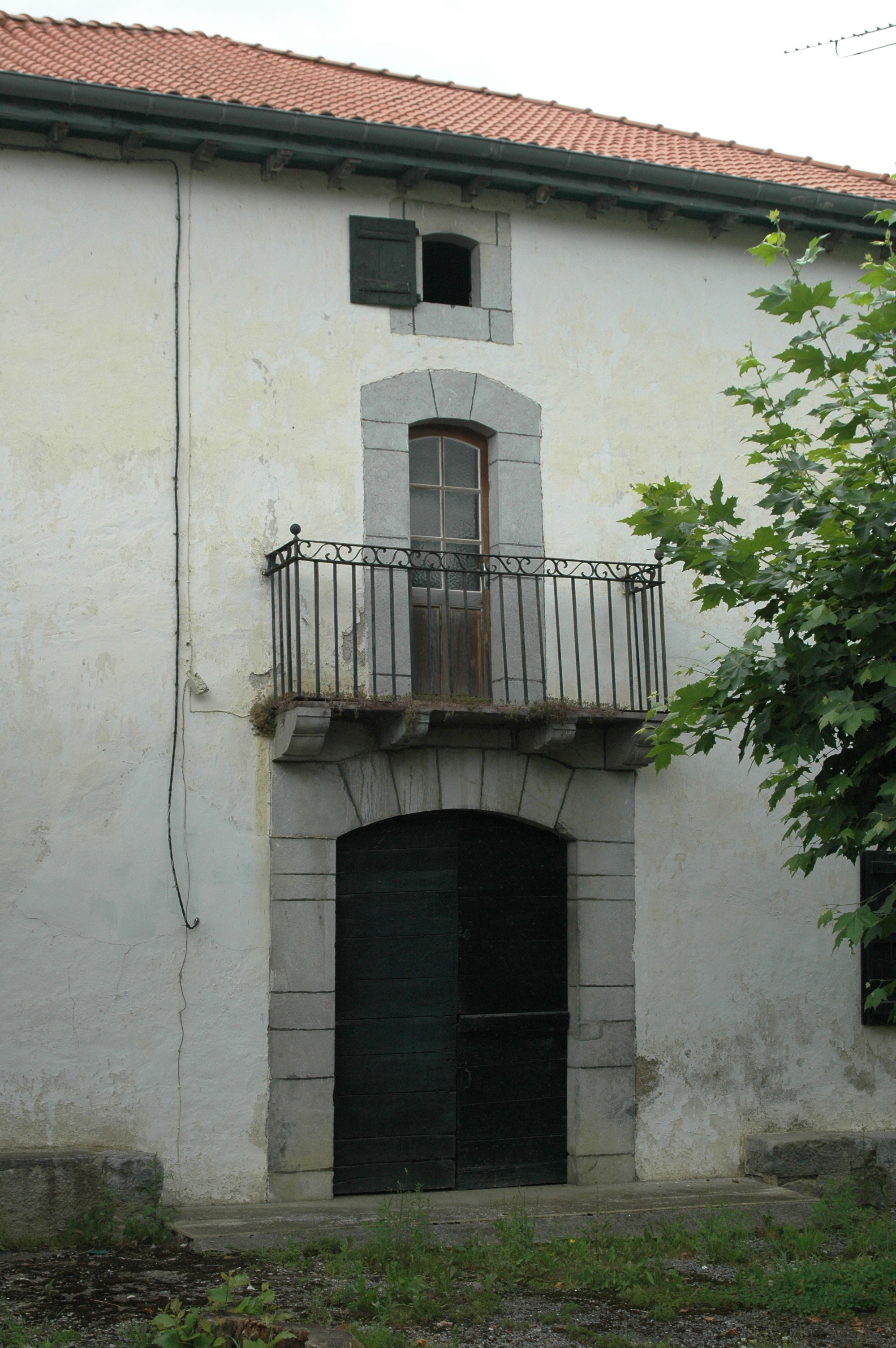
A Bottle door in the Lower Navarre style

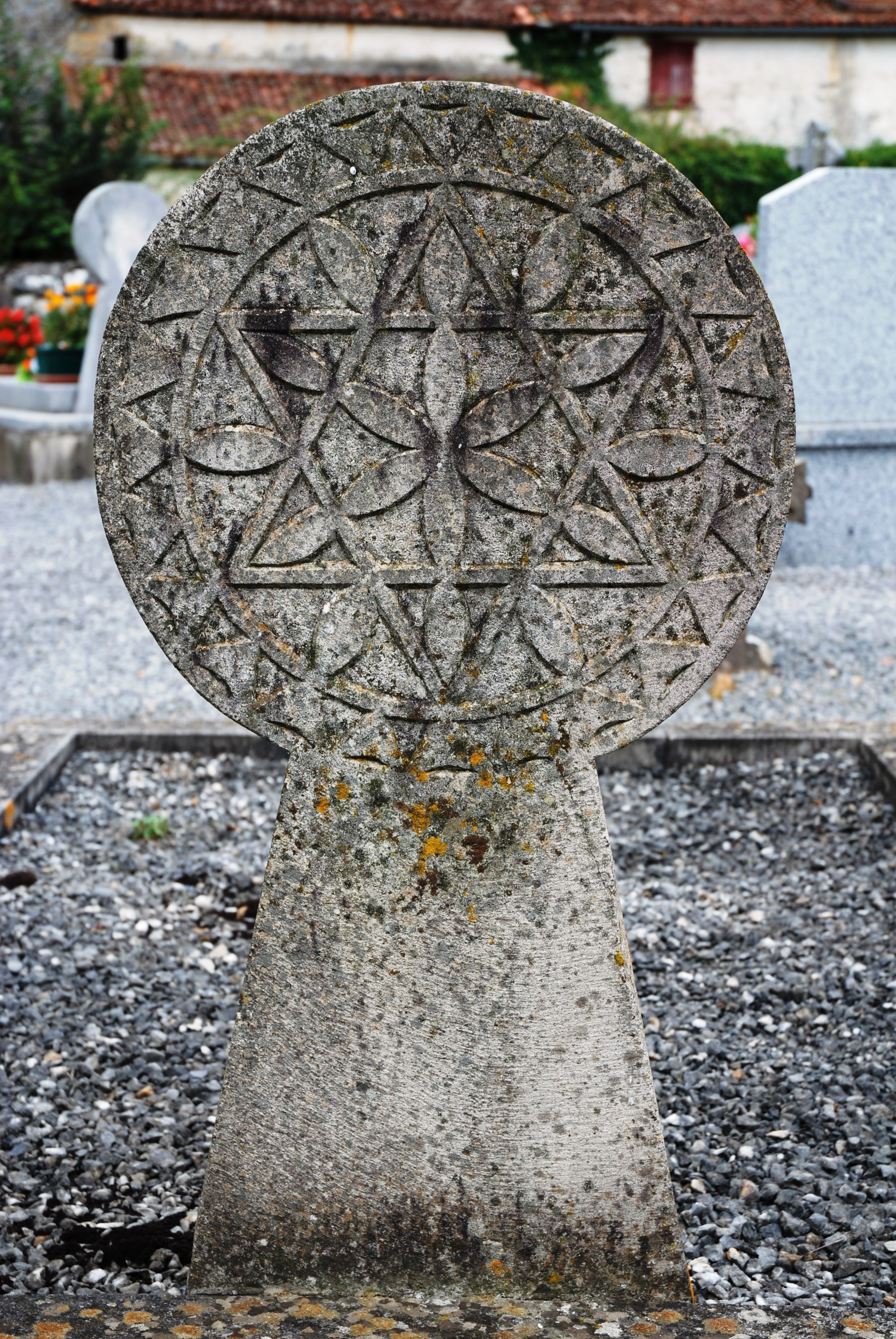
A Hilarri decorated with a Star of David

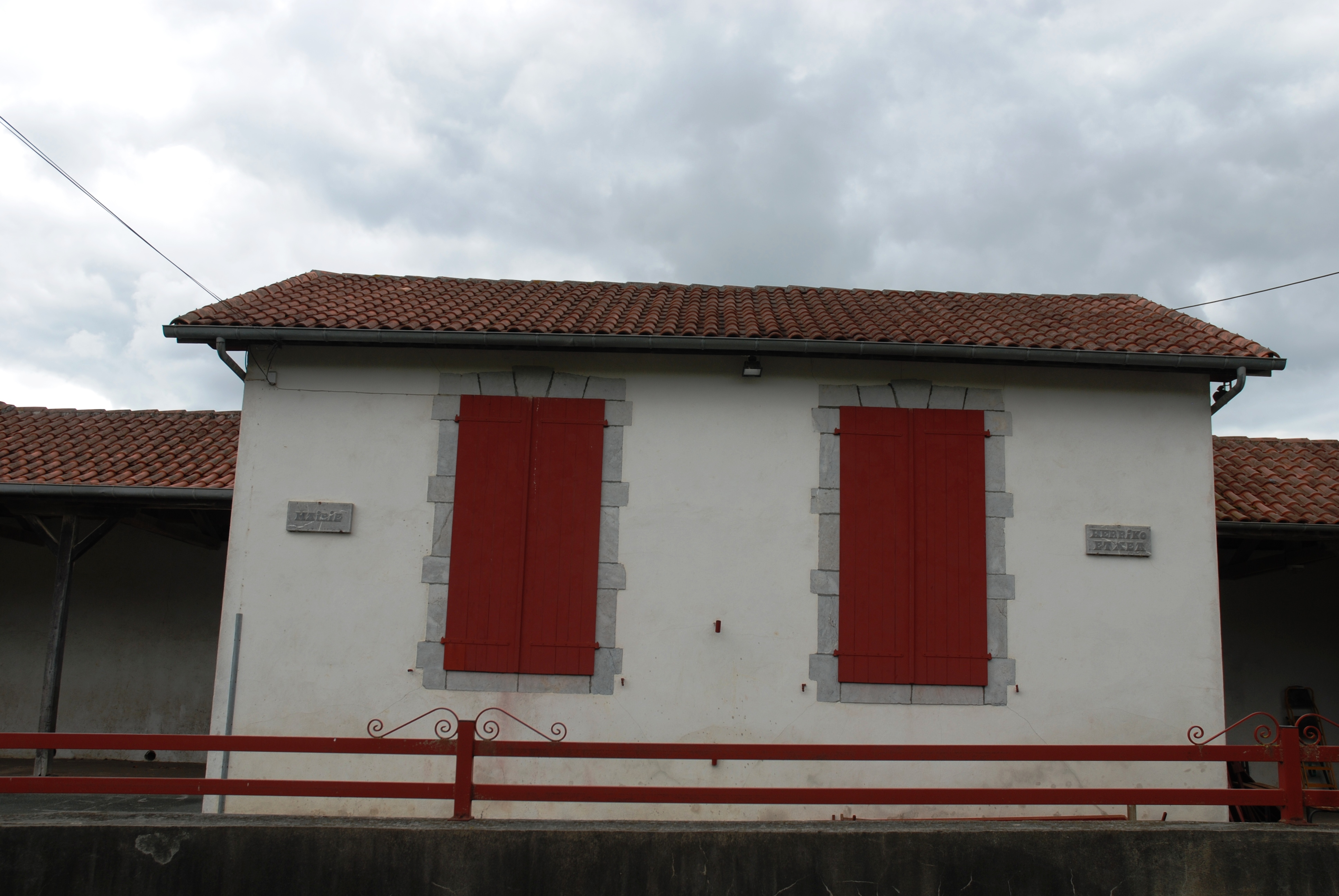
The town hall

=== Location ===
The town is part of the country Basque province of Cize of Lower Navarre. It is located in the Pyrenees mountains some 40 km in a direct line southeast of Bayonne and about 15 km northeast of the Spanish border. The commune is mostly farmland with scattered small forests.

=== Access ===
Access to Ainhice-Mongelos is via the Highway D933 (old highway 133) which runs northeast from Saint-Jean-le-Vieux which runs from southwest to northeast along the eastern side of the commune through the village of Mongelos continues northeast, ending near Saint Palais. Just south of the commune at Lacarre, the Highway D422 branches from the D933 to the northwest and passes through the western side of the commune, ending at Lopeenia just to the west of the commune. No other highways enter the commune. The village of Anhice-Mongelos can be reached by a country road from the D933 at Mongelos or by any of the many country roads which cover the commune.

=== Hydrography ===
In the Drainage basin of the Adour, the commune is traversed by a tributary of the Nive, the Lakako erreka (which originates in Ainhice-Mongelos) and, a tributary of the Laurhibar, the Arzubiko erreka and by tributaries of the latter, the Bassaguibeléko erreka and the Idiondoa brook. The Artikaitéko erreka which flows into Bidouze also passes through the commune.

=== Localities and hamlets ===
- Achurdé
- Ainhice
- Artikite
- Azeria
- Barnetchéa (Barnetxea)
- Bertéretchia
- Bidartéa
- Bidégaïnéa
- Caracoitchia
- Chilténéa
- Elizetchékoborda
- Erdoïs Etcheberria
- Erdoïsia
- Erretoraenia
- Etcheberritoa
- Etchéparéa
- Gohanetxea
- Harraldéa
- Harrispéa
- Héguilondoa
- Idiartekoborda
- Ihitsia
- Irazabalea
- Irumia
- Ithurraldéa
- Kousketikoborda
- Larraldéa
- Martiréma
- Mongelos
- Munhoa
- Officialdéya
- Orkaïtzéa
- Sallaberria

== Toponymy ==
The name of the commune in Basque is Ainhize-Monjolose. According to Jean-Baptiste Orpustan the origin of the name Ainhice remains unknown. According to Brigitte Jobbé-Duval Mongelos is a Gascon name meaning Mont Jaloux (Mount Jealous).

The following table details the origins of the commune name and other names in the commune.

Name	Spelling	Date	Source	Page	Origin	Description
Angelos	Anƒiz	1135	Orpustan			Village
	Aniça	1264	Mérimée			
	Aniça	1309	Orpustan			
	Anhice	1304	Mérimée			
	Anhice	1307	Orpustan			
	Aniça	1350	Mérimée			
	Anhice	1366	Mérimée			
	Anhice	1413	Orpustan			
	Ainza	1513	Raymond	4	Pamplona	
	Añiza	1621	Raymond	4	Biscay	
	Aniça	1621	Raymond	4	Biscay	
	Aynice	1621	Raymond	4	Biscay	
	Ainhisse	1665	Raymond	4	Navarre	
	Ainza	1513	Raymond	4	Pamplona	
Mongelos	Mongelos	1249	Mérimée			Village
	Mongelos	1264	Orpustan			
	Mongelos	1309	Orpustan			
	Mongelos	1413	Orpustan			
	Mont gelos	1292	Mérimée			
	Montis gelosi	1304	Mérimée			
	Mont gelos	1307	Orpustan			
	Monjelos	1321	Raymond	115	Camara	
	Mont gelos	1350	Orpustan			
	Mongelos en Cize	1477	Raymond	115	Ohix	
	Saint-Jean de Mongelos	1703	Raymond	115	Ohix	
Achurdé	Achurdé	1863	Raymond	2		A mountain pass between Lantabat and Ainhice-Mongelos
Elizaldea	Eliçalde	1412	Mérimée			List of fires in the Kingdom of Navarre
Elizetchékoborda	Élissetche	1863	Raymond	58		Fief, vassal of the Kingdom of Navarre
Erdoïs	Erdoïs	1863	Raymond	59		Fief, vassal of the Kingdom of Navarre. Raymond also mentions that there was a Prebendary of the name "founded in the church of Ainhice".
Fleur-de-Lys	Flor-de-Lis	1621	Raymond	64	Biscay	Fief, vassal of the Kingdom of Navarre

Sources:

- Orpustan: Jean-Baptiste Orpustan, New Basque Toponymy
- Mérimée: Presentation of Ainhice-Mongelos on the Ministry of Culture database.
- Raymond: Topographic Dictionary of the Department of Basses-Pyrenees, 1863, on the page numbers indicated in the table. (in French)

Origins:

- Pamplona: Titles of Pamplona
- Biscay: Martin Biscay
- Navarre: Regulations of the States of Navarre
- Camara: Titles of the Camara de Comptos
- Ohix: Contracts of Ohix
- Bayonne: Visitations of the Diocese of Bayonne

== History ==
The medieval village of Mongelos was established in 1240 as subject to the King of Navarre. Formerly subject to Ainhice, they were reunited on 16 August 1841.

== Administration ==
List of successive mayors of Anhice-Mongelos

From	To	Name
1995	2004	Guillaume Eyharts
2004	2026	Jean-Pierre Irigoin

=== Inter-communality ===
The commune belongs to seven inter-communal organisations:

- the Communauté d'agglomération du Pays Basque
- the AEP union of Ainhice
- the energy union of Pyrenees-Atlantiques
- the school union for RPI Ainhice-Gamarthe-Lacarre
- the inter-communal association for the development and management of the abattoir at Saint-Jean-Pied-de-Port
- the joint association for the watershed of the Nive
- the union to support Basque culture.

== Population ==
The inhabitants of the commune are known as Ainhiztars or Monjolostars.

Historical population
Year	Pop.	±% p.a.
1968	226	—
1975	199	−1.80%
1982	179	−1.50%
1990	173	−0.43%
1999	175	+0.13%
2007	168	−0.51%
2012	157	−1.35%
2017	173	+1.96%
2023	168	−0.49%
Source: INSEE

== Economy ==
Economic activity is mainly agricultural. The town is part of the zone of appellation of Ossau-iraty.

Euskal Herriko Laborantza Ganbara or the "Chamber of Agriculture for the Basque Country" is an association under the law of 1901 founded on 15 January 2005 and is headquartered in Ainhice-Mongelos.

== Culture and heritage ==
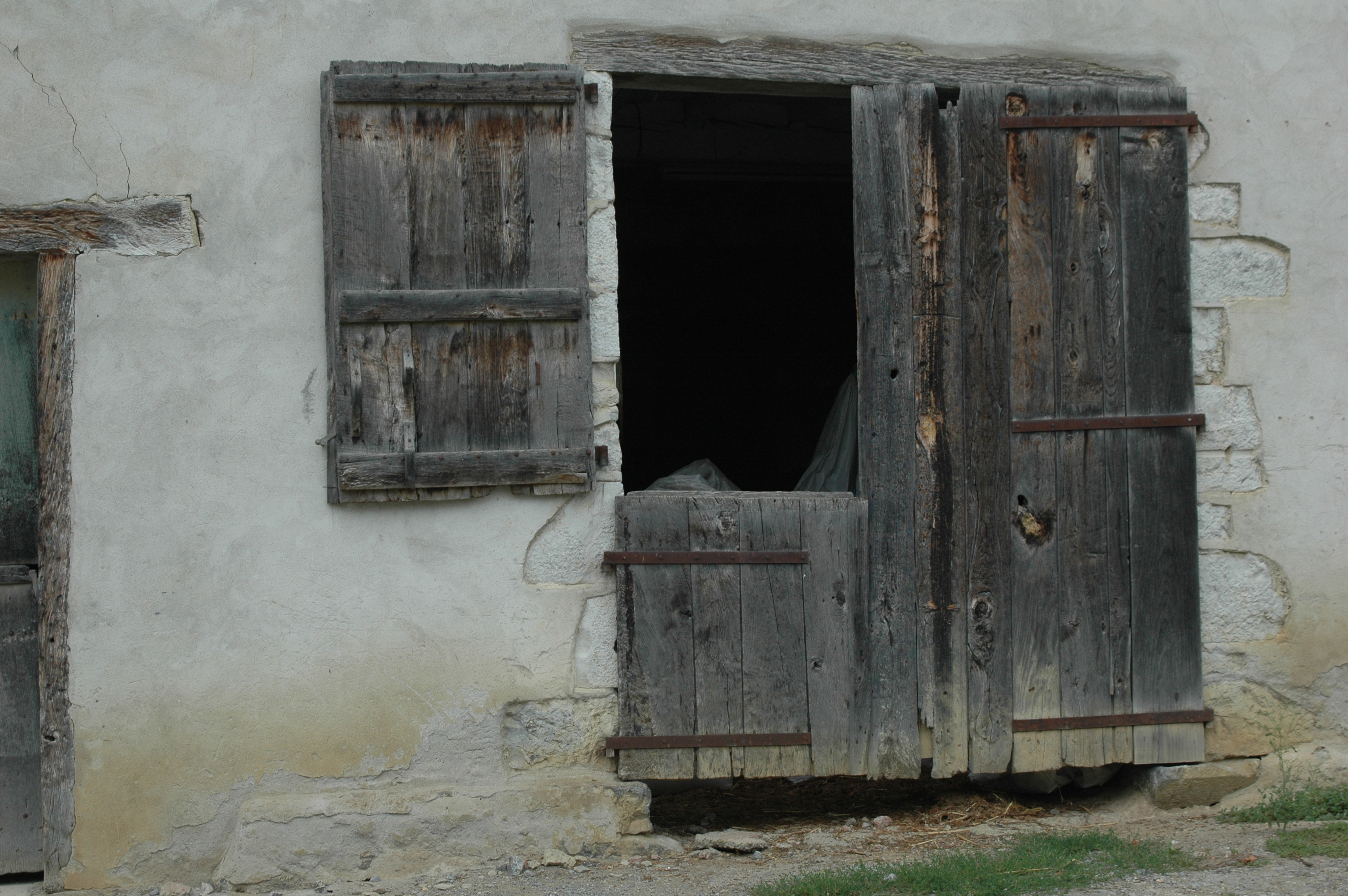
Farm gate

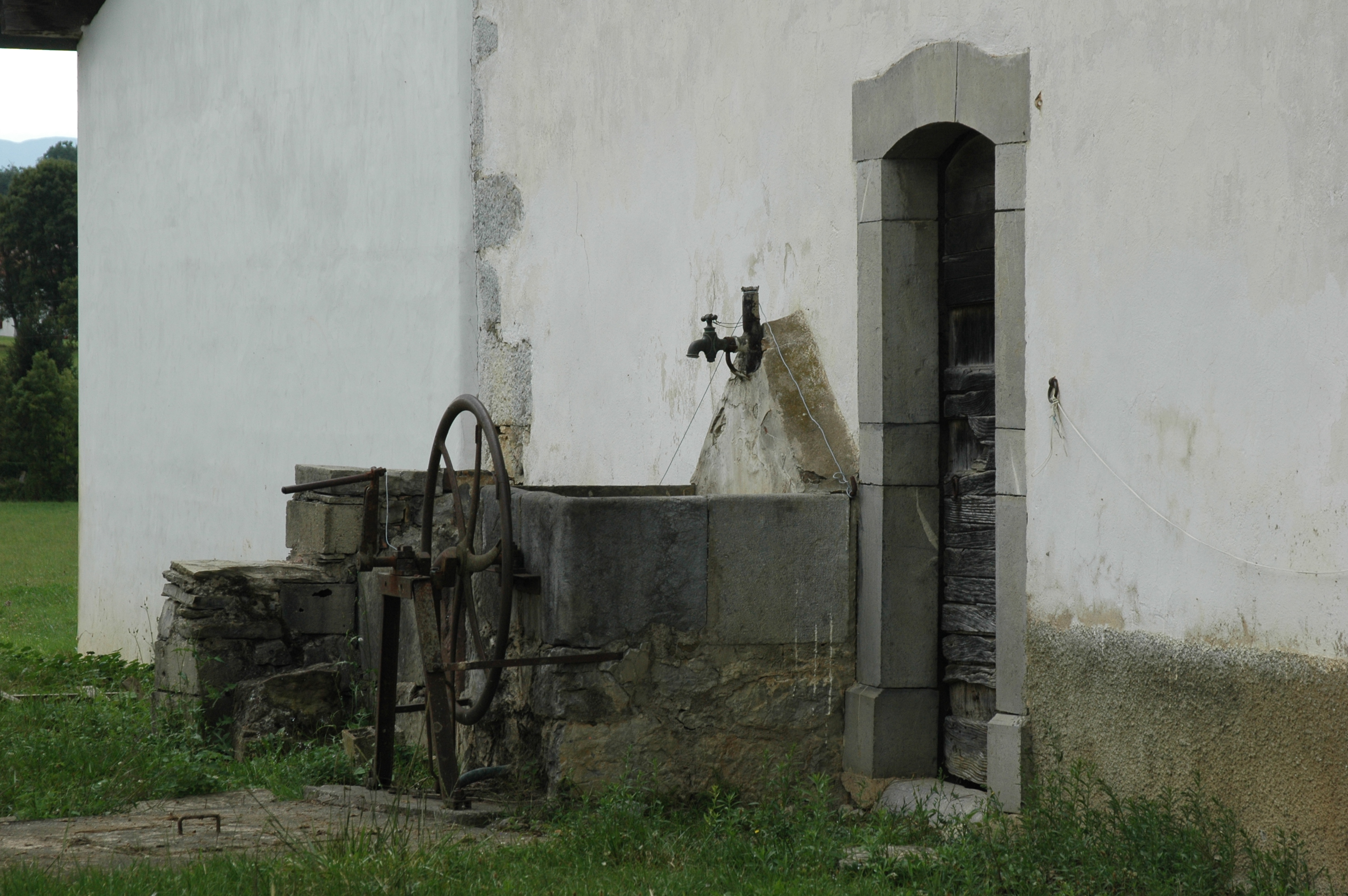
Well

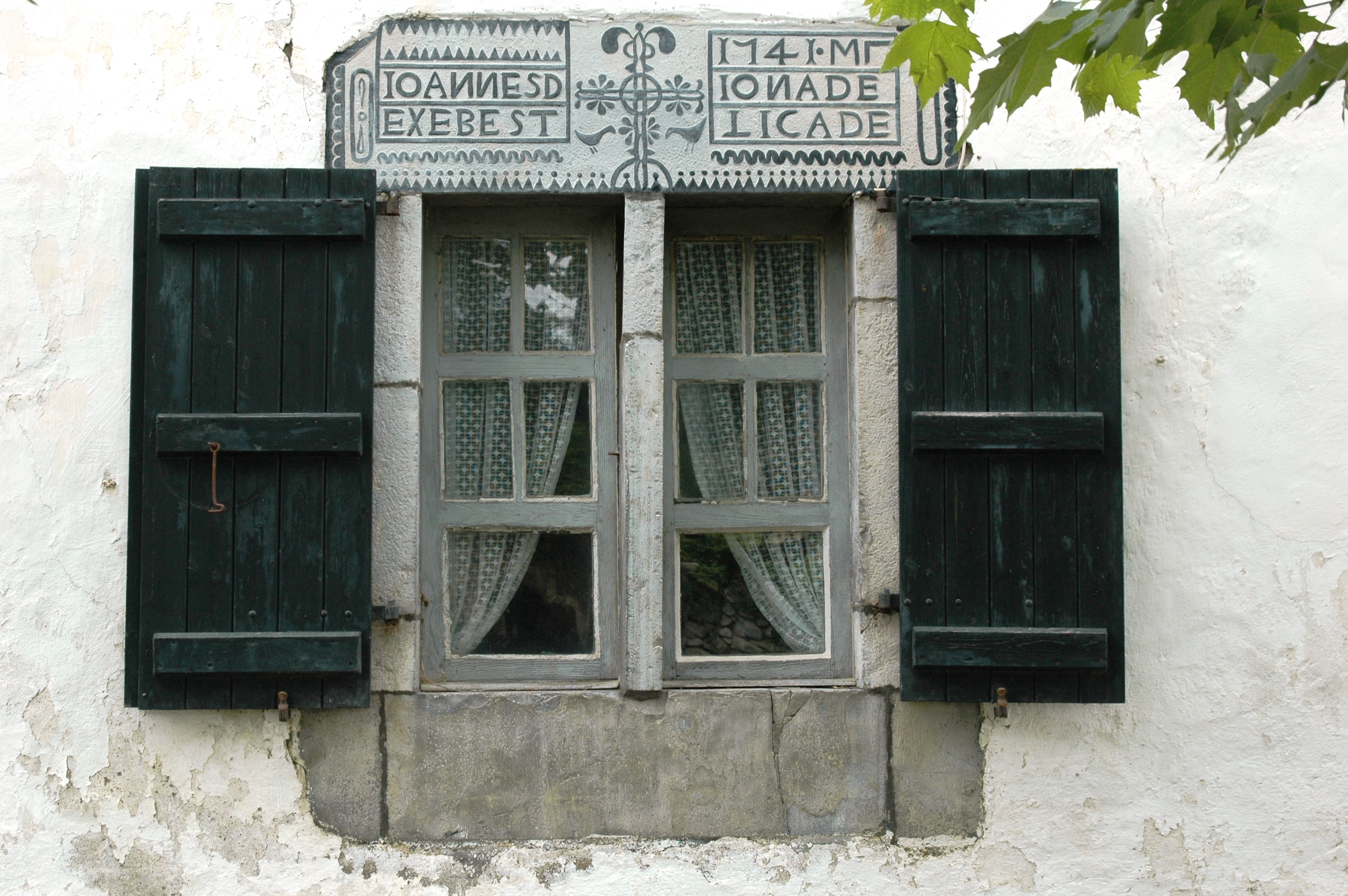
Window lintel (1741)

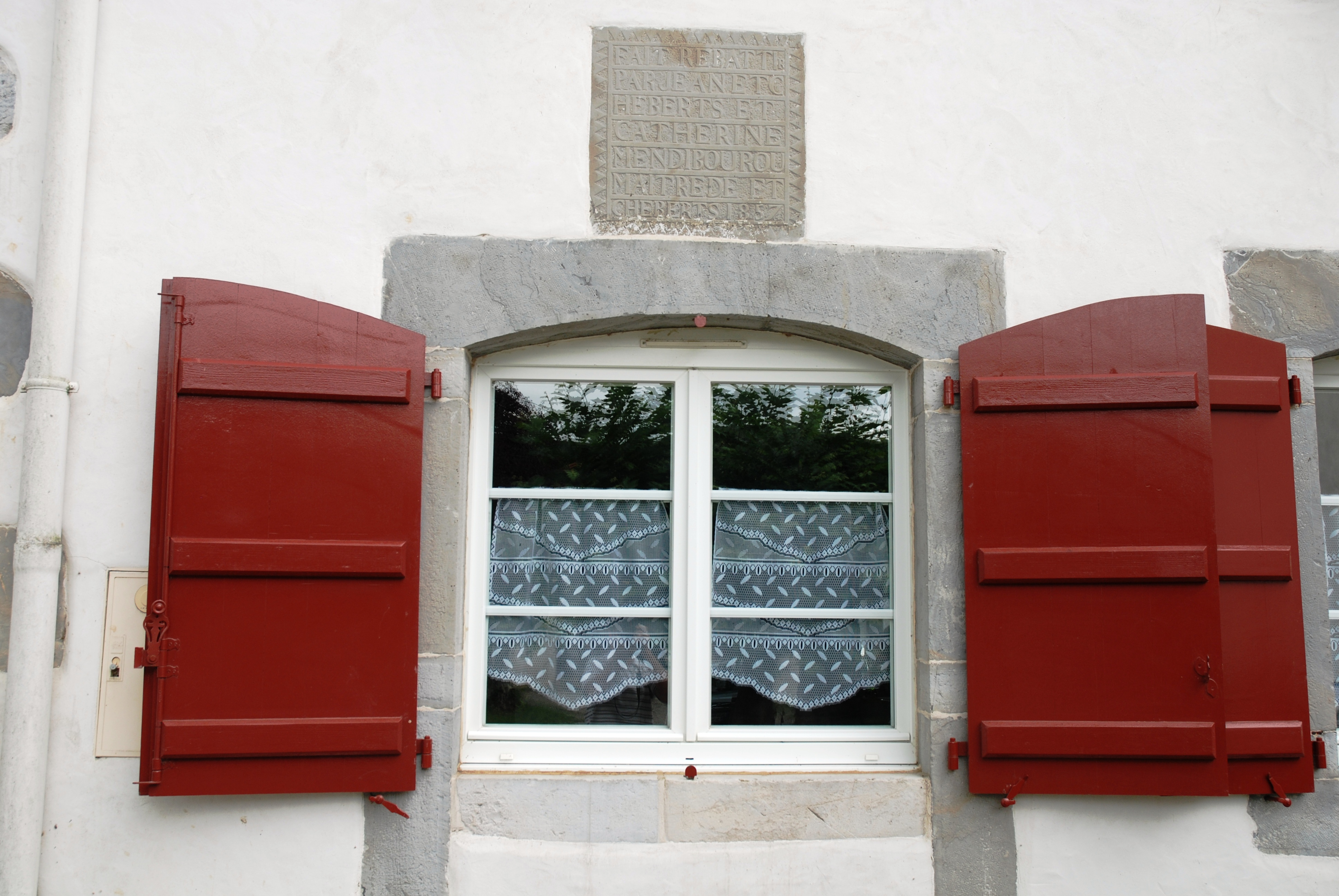
House from 1857

=== Languages ===
According to the Map of the Seven Basque Provinces published in 1863 by Prince Louis-Lucien Bonaparte, the dialect of Basque spoken in Ainhice-Mongelos is eastern low Navarrese.

=== Civil heritage ===
Several houses and farms are registered as historical monuments. These are:

- Houses and Farms (18th & 19th century)
- Barnetxea Farm (17th century)
- Elizaldea Farm (17th century)
- Etxeparea Farm (17th century)
- Irazabalea Farm (17th century)

=== Religious heritage ===
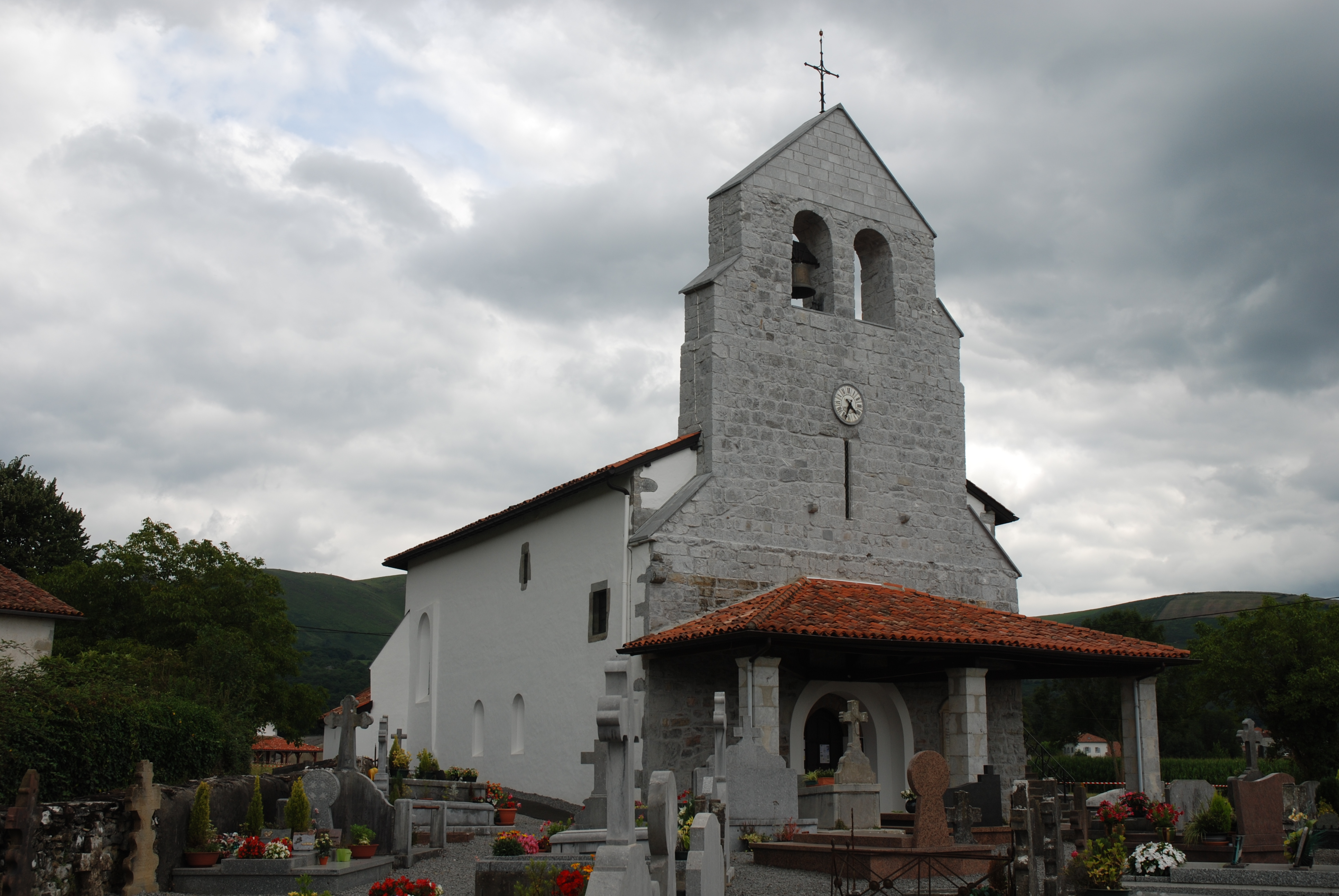
Church of the Assumption

- Church of the Assumption (14th century)

== Facilities ==
The town has a kindergarten.

== See also ==
- Communes of the Pyrénées-Atlantiques department
