= Joyeuse (disambiguation) =

Joyeuse is the name of Charlemagne's sword and is the French word for "joyous".

Joyeuse may also refer to:

- Joyeuse (river), a river in France
- Joyeuse, Ardèche, a town in the French department of Ardèche
  - See also Duke of Joyeuse

== People with the surname ==
- René Joyeuse (1920–2012), French and American soldier, physician and researcher
