= Beyrie-sur-Joyeuse =

Beyrie-sur-Joyeuse Bithiriña
- Commune
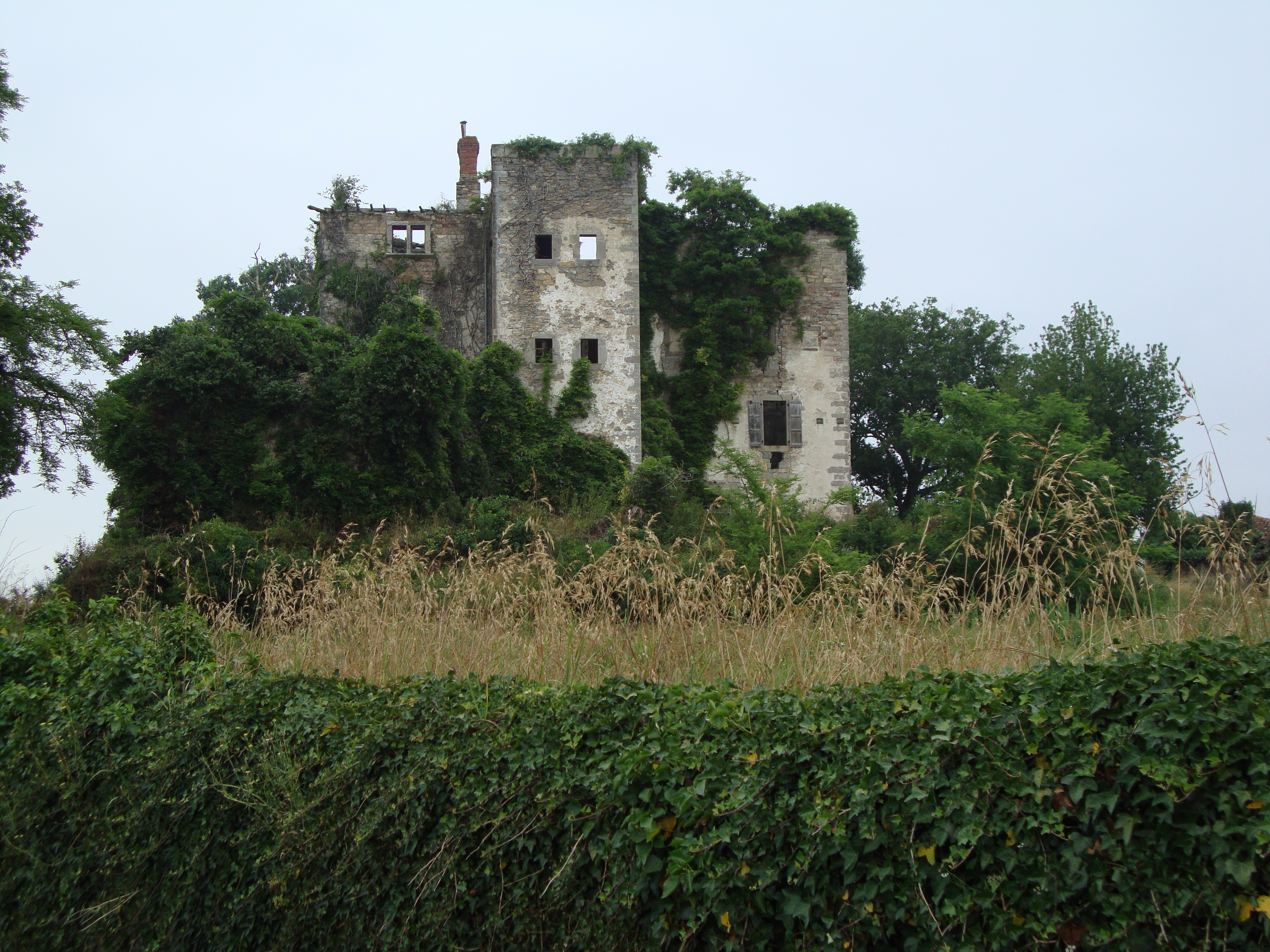
- The ruins of the chateau

- Coat of arms
- Location of Beyrie-sur-Joyeuse
- Location within France Location within Nouvelle-Aquitaine
- Coordinates: 43°18′49″N 1°04′47″W
- Country: France
- Region: Nouvelle-Aquitaine
- Department: Pyrénées-Atlantiques
- Arrondissement: Bayonne
- Canton: Pays de Bidache, Amikuze et Ostibarre
- Intercommunality: CA Pays Basque

Government
  - Mayor (2020–2026): Gilbert Dublanc
- Area^{1}: 22.80 km^{2} (8.80 sq mi)
- Elevation: 100 m (330 ft)
- Highest elevation: 328 m (1,076 ft)
- Lowest elevation: 52 m (171 ft)
- Population (2023): 561
  - Density: 24.6/km^{2} (63.7/sq mi)
- Time zone: UTC+01:00 (CET)
  - Summer (DST): UTC+02:00 (CEST)
- INSEE/Postal code: 64120 /64120
- ^{1} French Land Register data, which excludes lakes, ponds, glaciers > 1 km^{2} (0.386 sq mi or 247 acres) and river estuaries.

Beyrie-sur-Joyeuse (French pronunciation: [beʁi syʁ ʒwajøz], literally Beyrie on Joyeuse; Occitan: Beyrie sus Alegre; Basque: Bithiriña) is a commune of the Pyrénées-Atlantiques department in southwestern France.

It is located in the former province of Lower Navarre.

== See also ==
- Communes of the Pyrénées-Atlantiques department
