= Armendarits =

Armendarits Armendaritze
- Commune
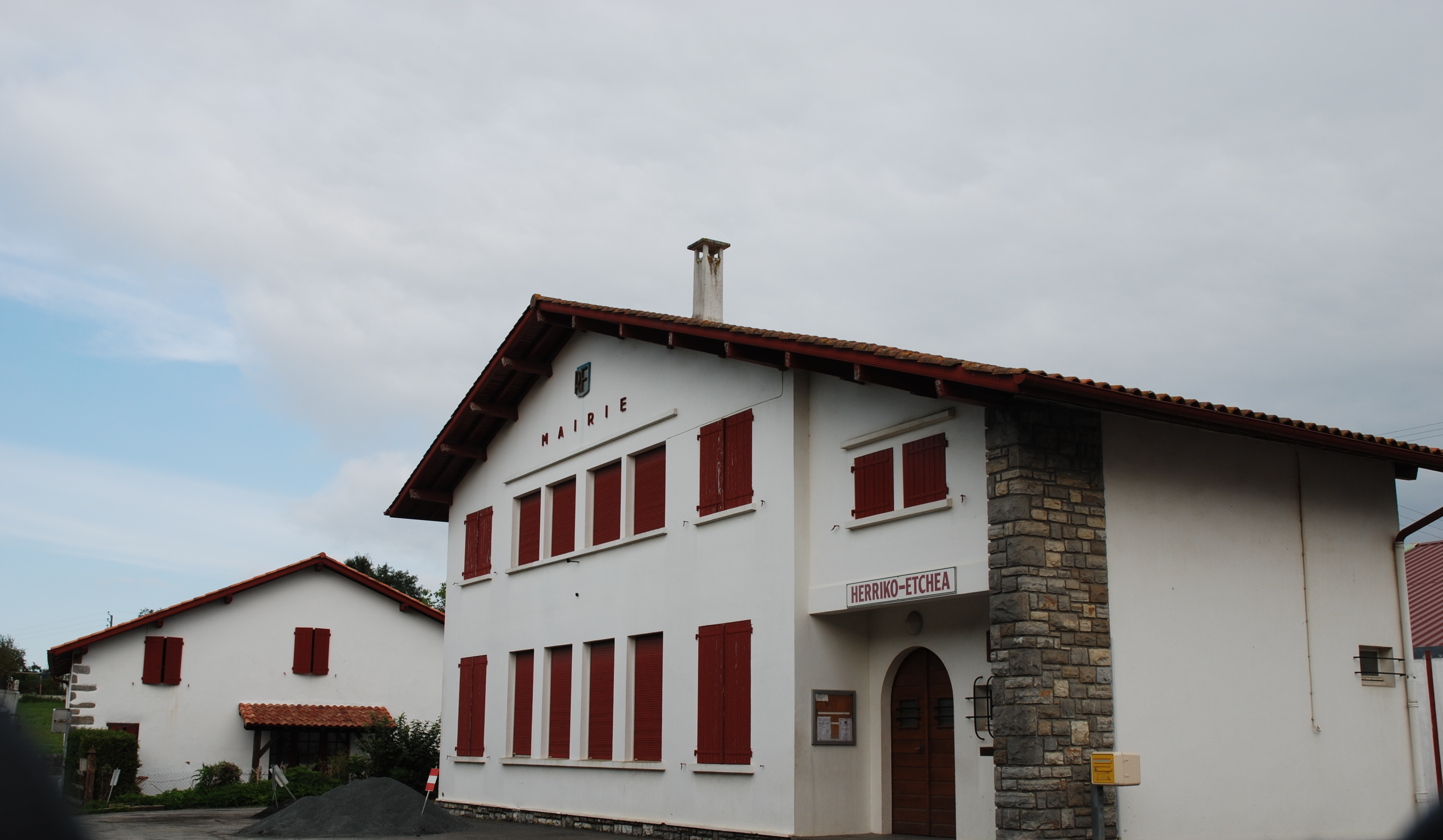
- Armendarits Town Hall

- Coat of arms
- Location of Armendarits
- Location within France Location within Nouvelle-Aquitaine
- Coordinates: 43°18′09″N 1°10′20″W
- Country: France
- Region: Nouvelle-Aquitaine
- Department: Pyrénées-Atlantiques
- Arrondissement: Bayonne
- Canton: Pays de Bidache, Amikuze et Ostibarre
- Intercommunality: CA Pays Basque

Government
  - Mayor (2020–2026): Lucien Delgue
- Area^{1}: 17.27 km^{2} (6.67 sq mi)
- Elevation: 182 m (597 ft)
- Highest elevation: 403 m (1,322 ft)
- Lowest elevation: 99 m (325 ft)
- Population (2023): 398
  - Density: 23.0/km^{2} (59.7/sq mi)
- Time zone: UTC+01:00 (CET)
  - Summer (DST): UTC+02:00 (CEST)
- INSEE/Postal code: 64046 /64640
- ^{1} French Land Register data, which excludes lakes, ponds, glaciers > 1 km^{2} (0.386 sq mi or 247 acres) and river estuaries.

Armendarits (French pronunciation: [aʁmɛ̃daʁits]; Occitan: Almoçadors; Basque: Armendaritze) is a commune in the Pyrénées-Atlantiques department in the Nouvelle-Aquitaine region of south-western France.

The inhabitants of the commune are known as Armendariztar in Basque.

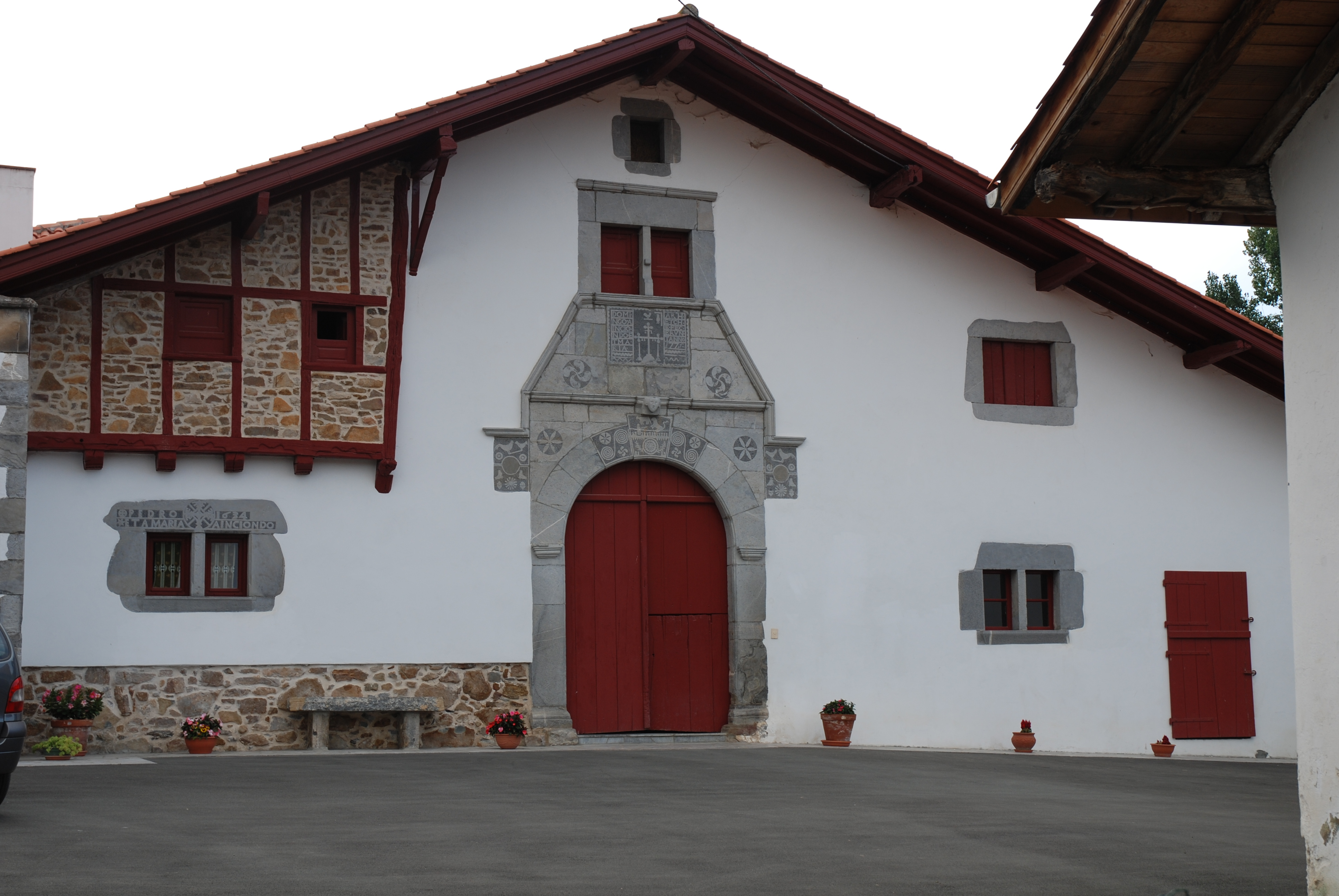
Lower Navarre House from 1775

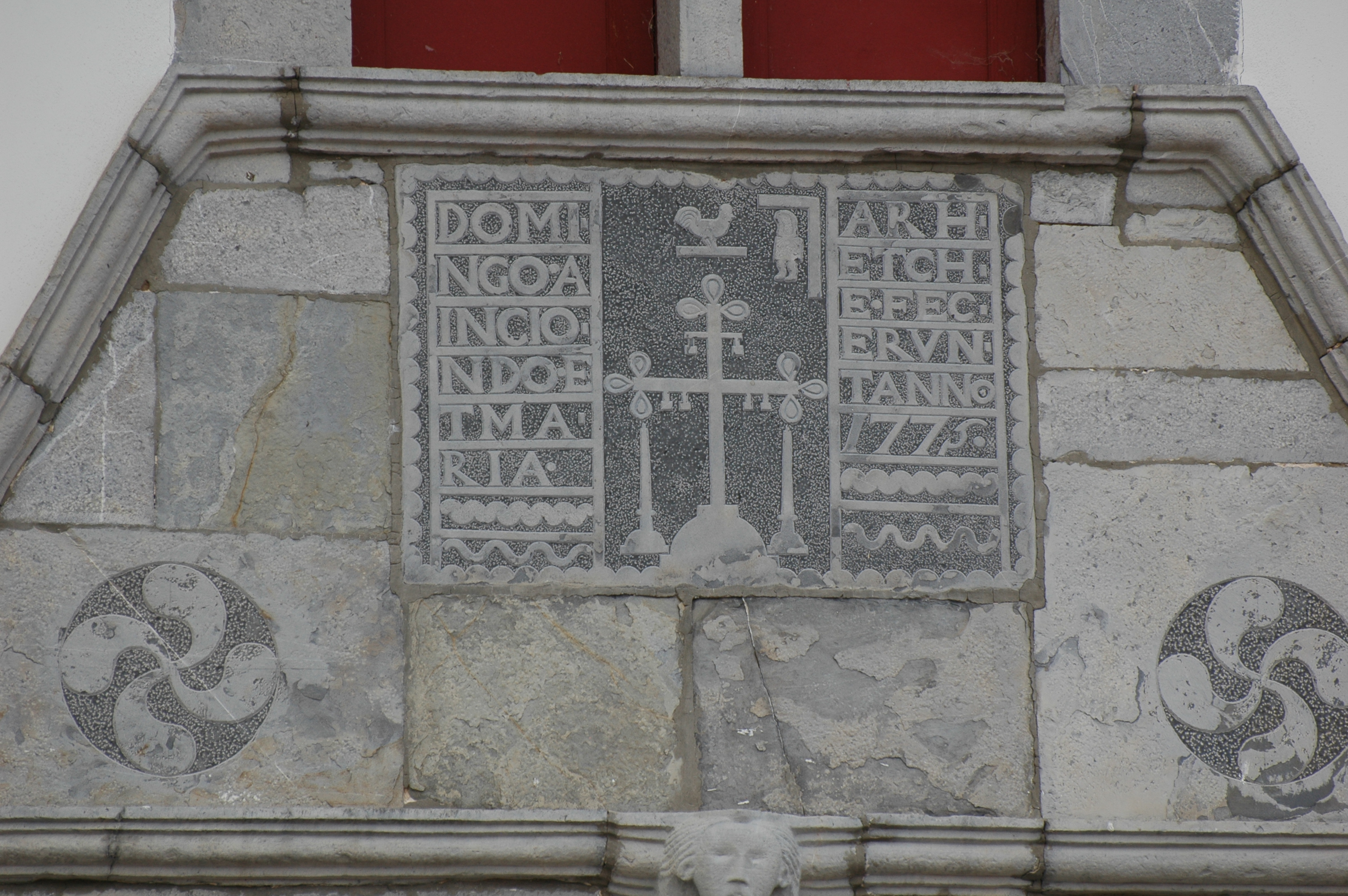
Sculpted Lintel

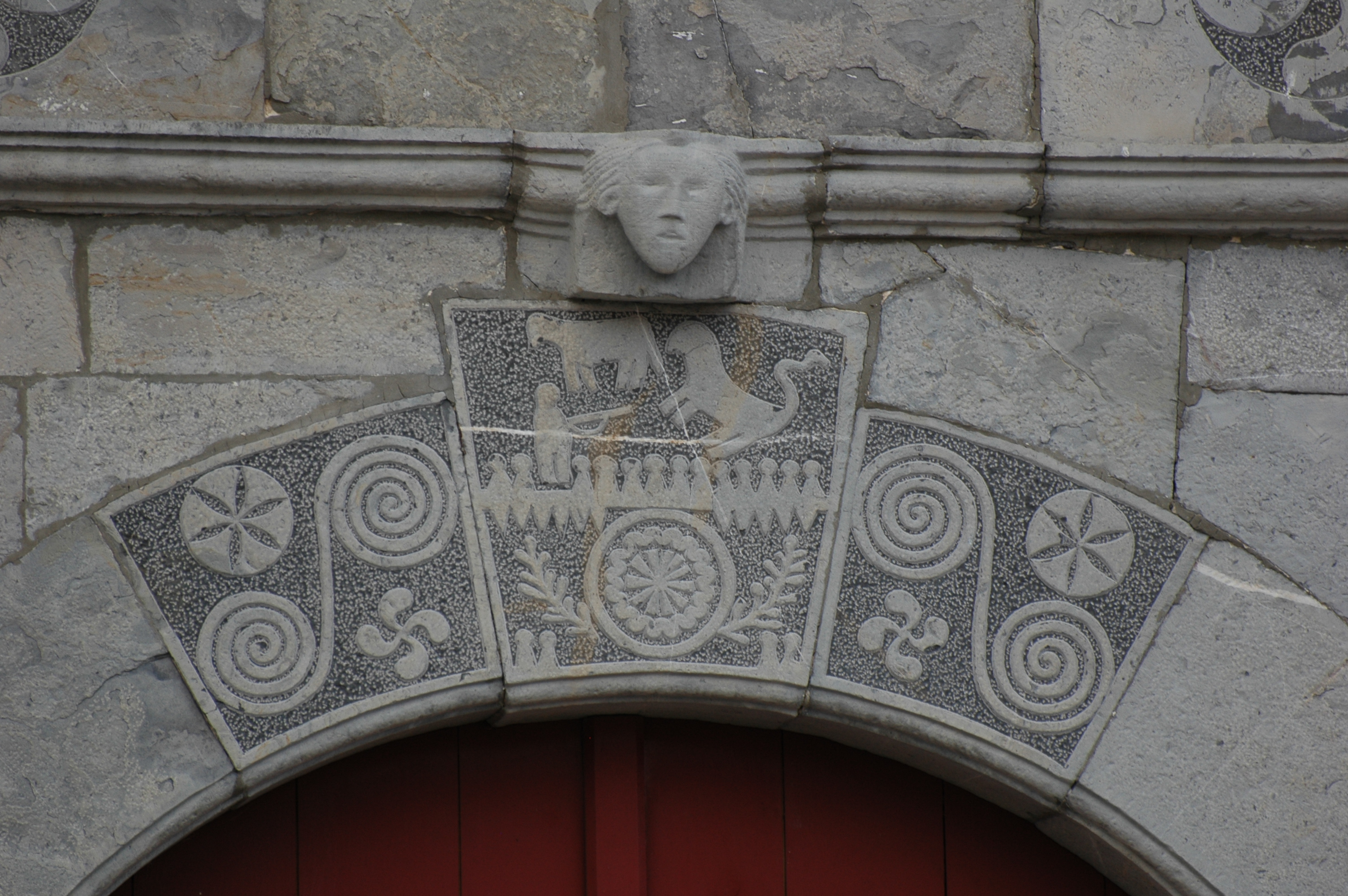
Sculpted Lintel

== Geography ==
Amendarits is located some 12 km south-west of Saint-Palais and some 8 km north-east of Irissarry and is in the former province of Lower Navarre. Access to the commune is by road D300 from Iholdy in the south to the village. The D8 going east from Iholdy also passes through the southern part of the commune. The D245 from Hélette in the west passes through the commune and the village and continues north to join the D14 just south-east of Méharin. There is also the D408 which links the village to the D8 road inside the commune. Apart from a few patches of forest the commune is entirely farmland.

Numerous streams rise in the commune: the Erreka Handia and its tributaries flows north past the village, the Iharte also flows north to the east of the village, and the Ossinako Erreka forms part of the south-western border as it flows south.

=== Places and Hamlets ===
- Aguerréa
- Aïntziondoa
- Albinoritzéko Borda (2 toponyms)
- Albinoritzia
- Altchia
- Alziéta
- Ameztoya
- Arbéletchia
- Armandegia
- Baratchartéa
- Barnetchia
- Bazterrechia
- Behamendy
- Béhitia
- Bidondoa
- Bigégaïnéa
- Bistaberry
- Bordaberria
- Bordaberriko Borda
- Bordamaria
- Bordécharria
- Bourdinateguia
- Carrica
- Céhabia
- Chichabalé
- Chimounénéa
- Chingolaénéa
- Chocohonia
- Curutzétako Borda
- Donamaria
- Donapétria
- Donapétriko Borda
- Donamaria
- Donastéya
- Elhina
- Elinume
- Elizabéhéréko Borda
- Elizatchéko Borda
- Errékartéa
- Etchartéa
- Etchebarne
- Etchébazterréa
- Etchégoïnberria
- Etchégoïnberriko Borda
- Etchégorria
- Etchénika
- Etchéparéa
- Eyhérabidé
- Eyhéraldéa
- Eyhéramounoa
- Fermindéguia
- Ferminéko Borda
- Gaïneko-Etchebarnéa
- Gaïneko-Meharu
- Garatéa
- Garatéko Borda
- Haramburua
- Harizhanditéguia
- Hatsandigaraia
- Iparréa
- Iribarnéa
- Irigaraya
- Ithurburua
- Ithurburuko Borda
- Jauregia
- Jauréguicharria
- Landetxeberri
- Larraldéa
- Larramendia
- Lazalen Borda
- Legartoa
- Lekunberria
- Marihanditéguia
- Mehatzia
- Mendihilia
- Mendiondo
- Mendirigaraya
- Olhanéko Borda
- Olharanéa
- Orgalitegia
- Ossina
- Oyhanburua
- Oyhénartéa
- Pékoborda
- Pochulua
- Salla
- Sallaberria
- Sallaberriko Borda
- Sallagoitinéa
- Sorhoéta
- Sorogaraia or Sorhogaraya
- Suhartéko Borda
- Teïleria
- Uhaldea
- Uhartéa
- Urrutia
- Urritiko Borda
- Zedarria

== Toponymy ==
The commune name in Basque is Armendaritze.

The following table details the origins of the commune name and other names in the commune.

Name	Spelling	Date	Source	Page	Origin	Description
Armendarits	Armandarys	1249	Orpustan	113		Village
	Armendariz	1256	Raymond	10	Bayonne	
	Sancta Maria de Armendaridz	1256	Raymond	10	Bayonne	
	Armendariz	1264	Orpustan	113		
	Armendarriz	1292	Orpustan	113		
	Armendaritz	1366	Orpustan	113		
	Armendaritz	1413	Orpustan	113		
	Armendaritz	1428	Raymond	10	Duchesne	
	Arbendaritz	1529	Raymond	10	Chapter	
Aguerréa	Aguerre	1863	Raymond	3		Fief, vassal of the Kingdom of Navarre
Curutzétako Borda	La Croix Boria	1863	Raymond	34		Place of pilgrimage
Élissetche	Élissetche	1863	Raymond	58		Fief, vassal of the Kingdom of Navarre
Etchebarne	Etchebarne	1863	Raymond	63		Place of pilgrimage

Sources:

- Orpustan: Jean-Baptiste Orpustan, New Basque Toponymy
- Raymond: Topographic Dictionary of the Department of Basses-Pyrenees, 1863, on the page numbers indicated in the table. (in French)

Origins:

- Bayonne: Cartulary of Bayonne or Livre d'Or (Book of Gold)
- Duchesne: Duchesne collection volume CXIV
- Chapter: Titles of the Chapter of Bayonne

== History ==
Paul Raymond noted on page 10 of his 1863 dictionary that Armendarits was a former Barony, vassal of the Kingdom of Navarre.

=== Heraldry ===
Arms of Armendarits	These arms were adopted by the town council in 2002 and are those of the Lords of Armendarits. The blazon of quarters 2 and 3 are those of the village of Armendarits Blazon: Quarterly, 1 and 4 Azure with a castel turreted masoned in Sable, port and windows the same; 2 and 3 two cows Gules horned, hoofed, collared, and belled in Argent arranged in pale.

== Administration ==
List of Successive Mayors

From	To	Name	Party	Position
1939	1964	Bertrand Ilharreborde		
1964	1986	Juliette Richard		
1986	1989	Laurent Garat		
1989	2026	Lucien Delgue	UMP	President of the Community of Communes

=== Inter-communality ===
Armendarits is part of seven inter-communal structures:

- the Communauté d'agglomération du Pays Basque;
- the AEP association of Arberoue;
- the Energy association of Pyrénées-Atlantiques;
- the inter-communal association for school transport and educational grouping of Méharin and Armendarits;
- the inter-communal association for development and management of the slaughterhouse at Saint-Jean-Pied-de-Port;
- the joint association Garbiki;
- the association to support Basque culture.

== Demography ==
Historical population

Year	Pop.	±% p.a.
1793	706	—
1821	805	+0.47%
1846	840	+0.17%
1872	746	−0.46%
1901	631	−0.58%
1926	510	−0.85%
1946	512	+0.02%
1962	446	−0.86%
1968	420	−1.00%

Year	Pop.	±% p.a.
1975	396	−0.84%
1982	386	−0.36%
1990	372	−0.46%
1999	357	−0.46%
2007	379	+0.75%
2012	391	+0.63%
2017	405	+0.71%
2023	398	−0.29%

Source: EHESS and INSEE

== Economy ==
Economic activity is mainly agricultural. The commune is part of the Appellation d'origine contrôlée (AOC) zone of Ossau-iraty.

== Culture and Heritage ==
=== Civil Heritage ===
Several buildings and sites in the commune are registered as historical monuments:

- The Jauregia Manor (17th century)
- The Urrutia Farmhouse (1636)
- The Uhaldea Farmhouse (1780)
- The Sorogaraia Farmhouse (1602)
- Houses and Farms (17th-19th century)

Other sites of interest

- A protohistoric fortified place (a gaztelu zahar) at Elhina.

=== Houses in Armendarits Picture Gallery ===
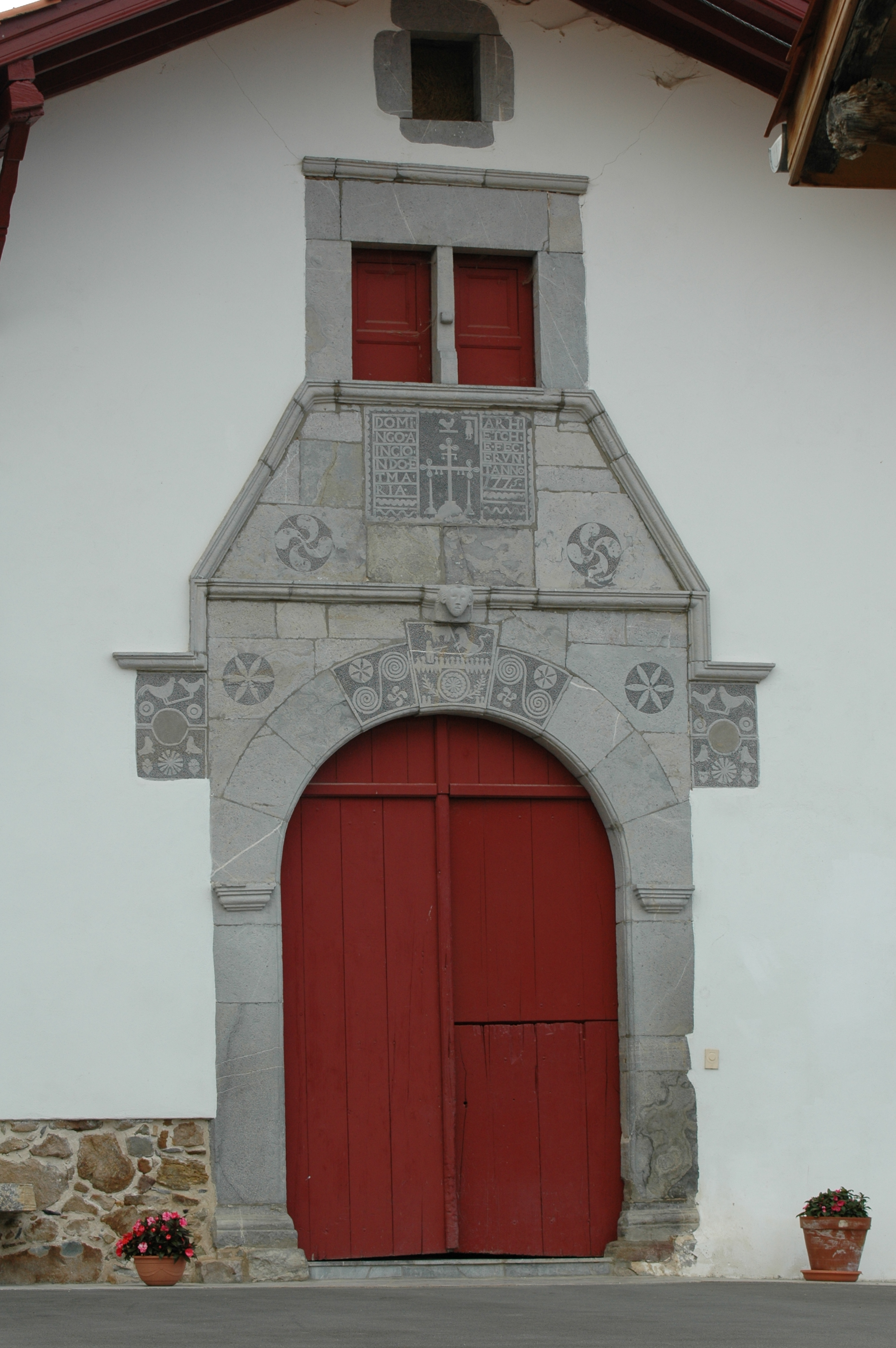
Sculpted Lintel

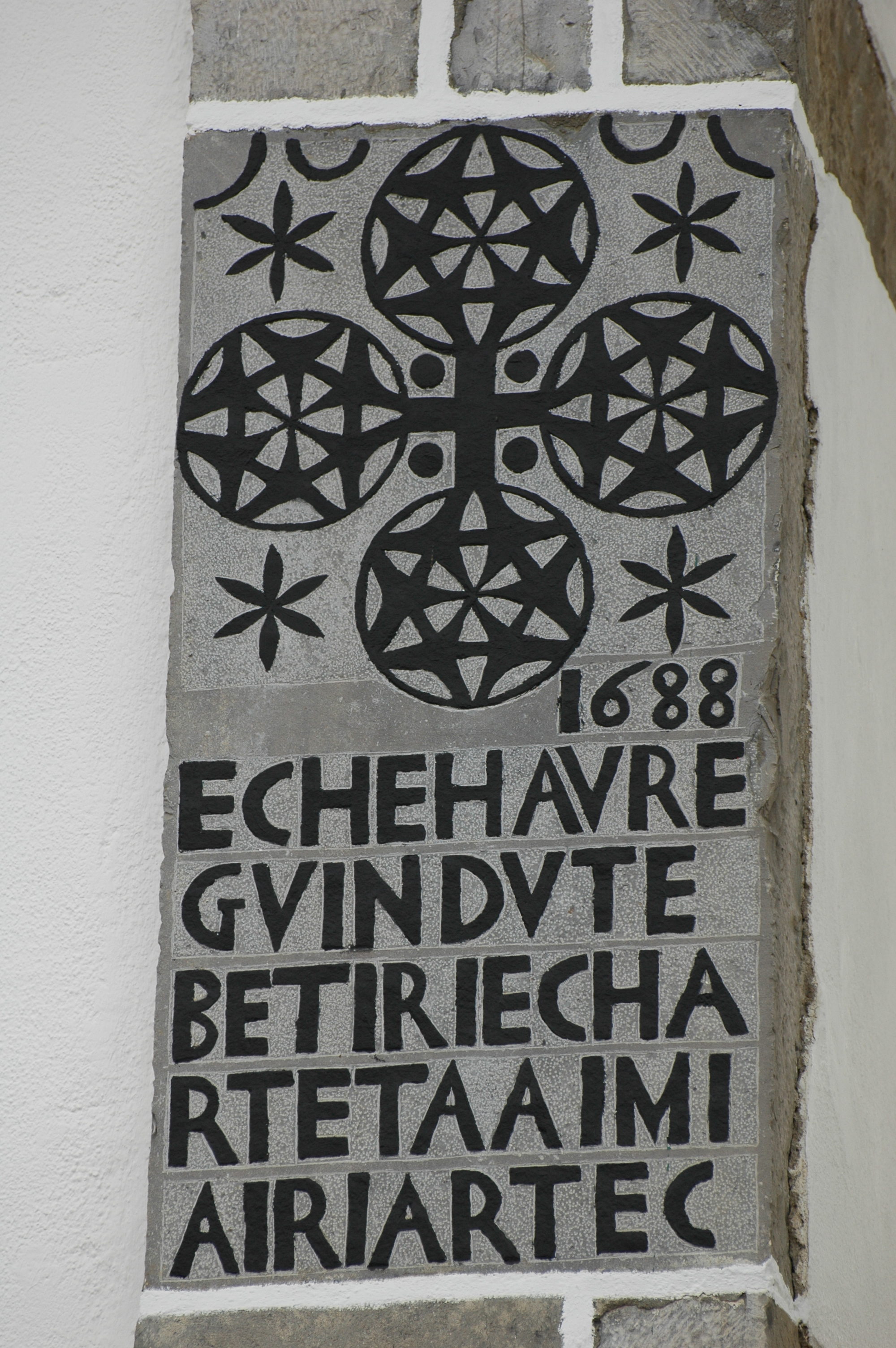
A sculpted breezeblock

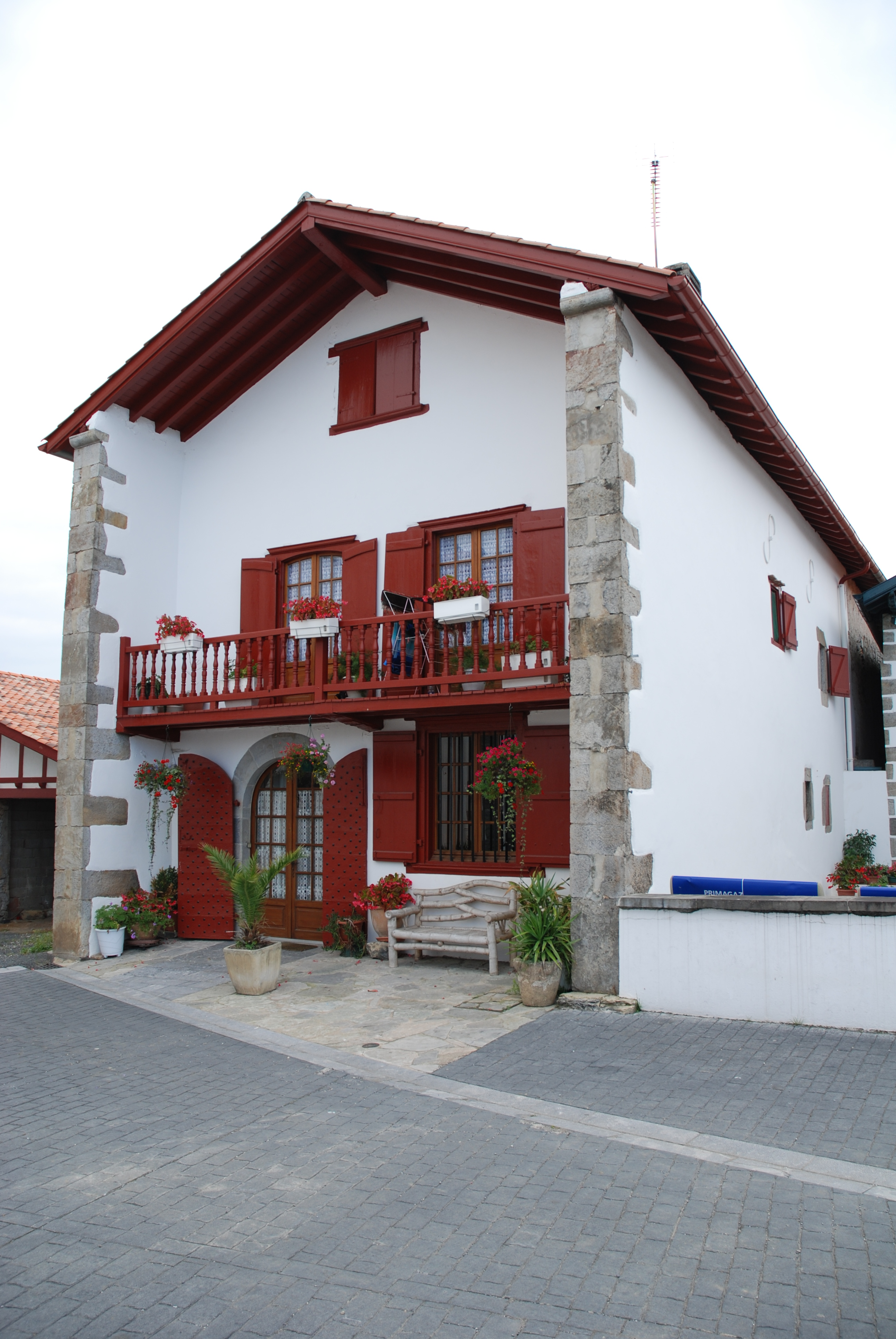
A Lower Navarre House

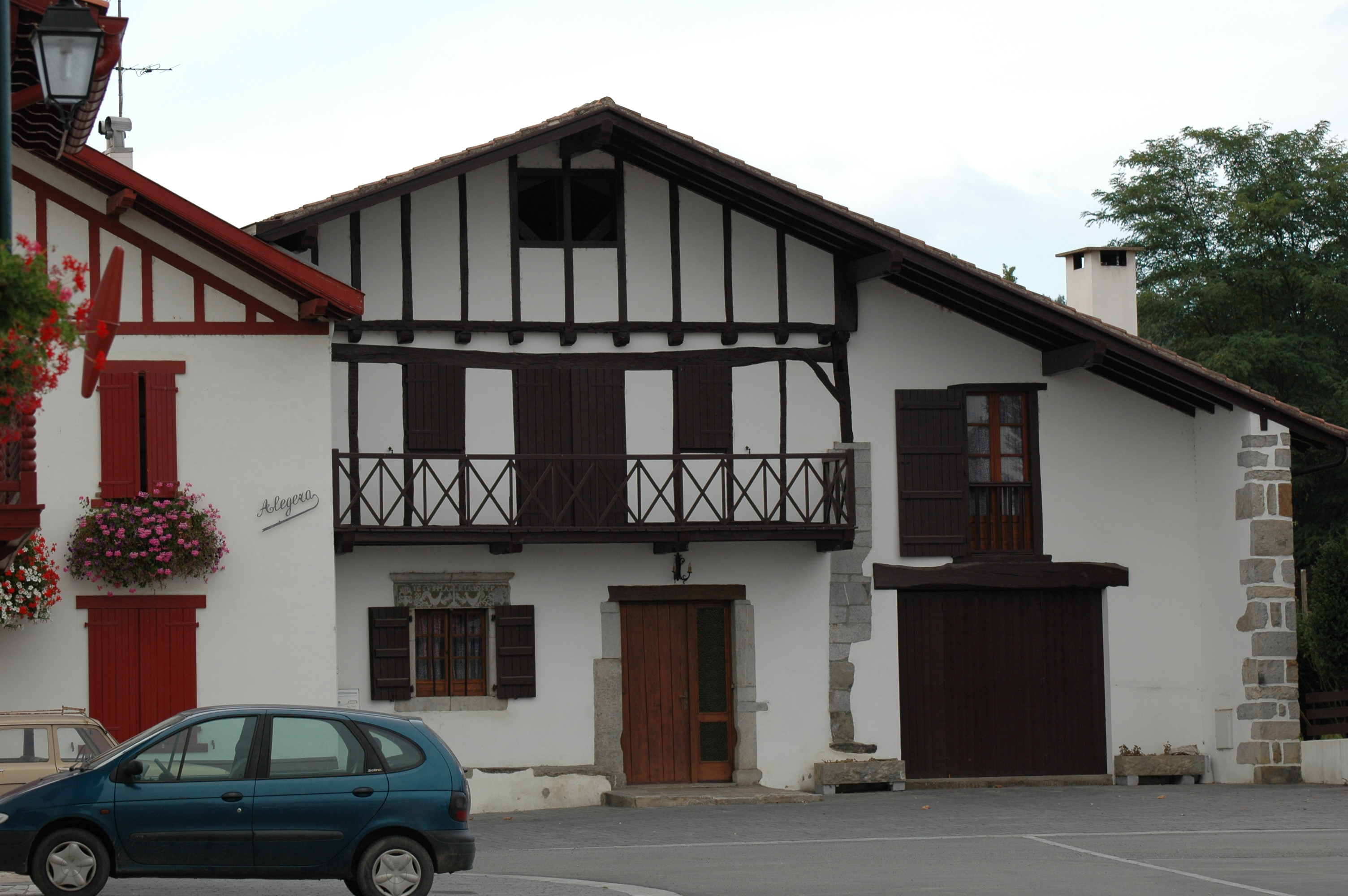
A Lower Navarre House

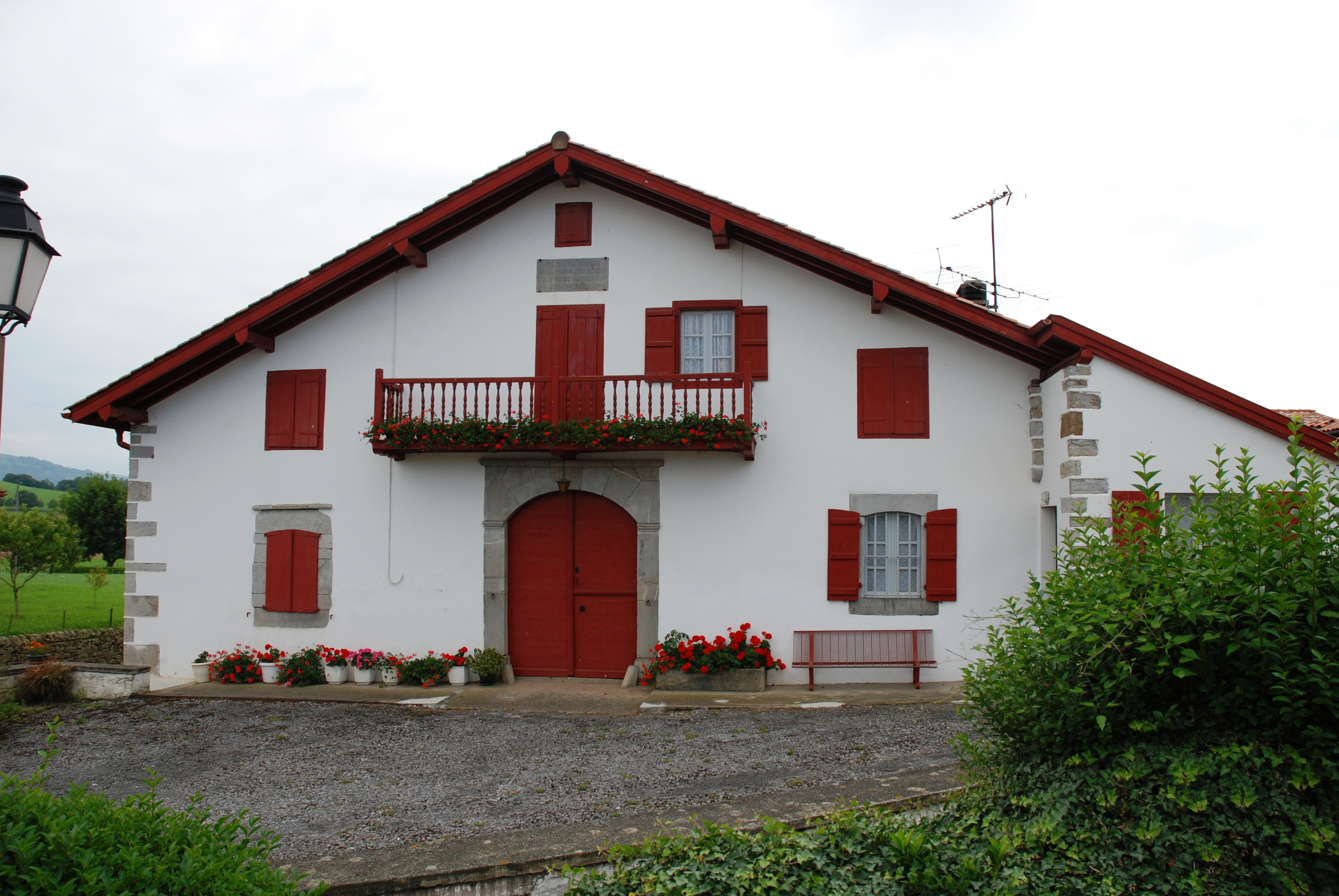
A Lower Navarre House

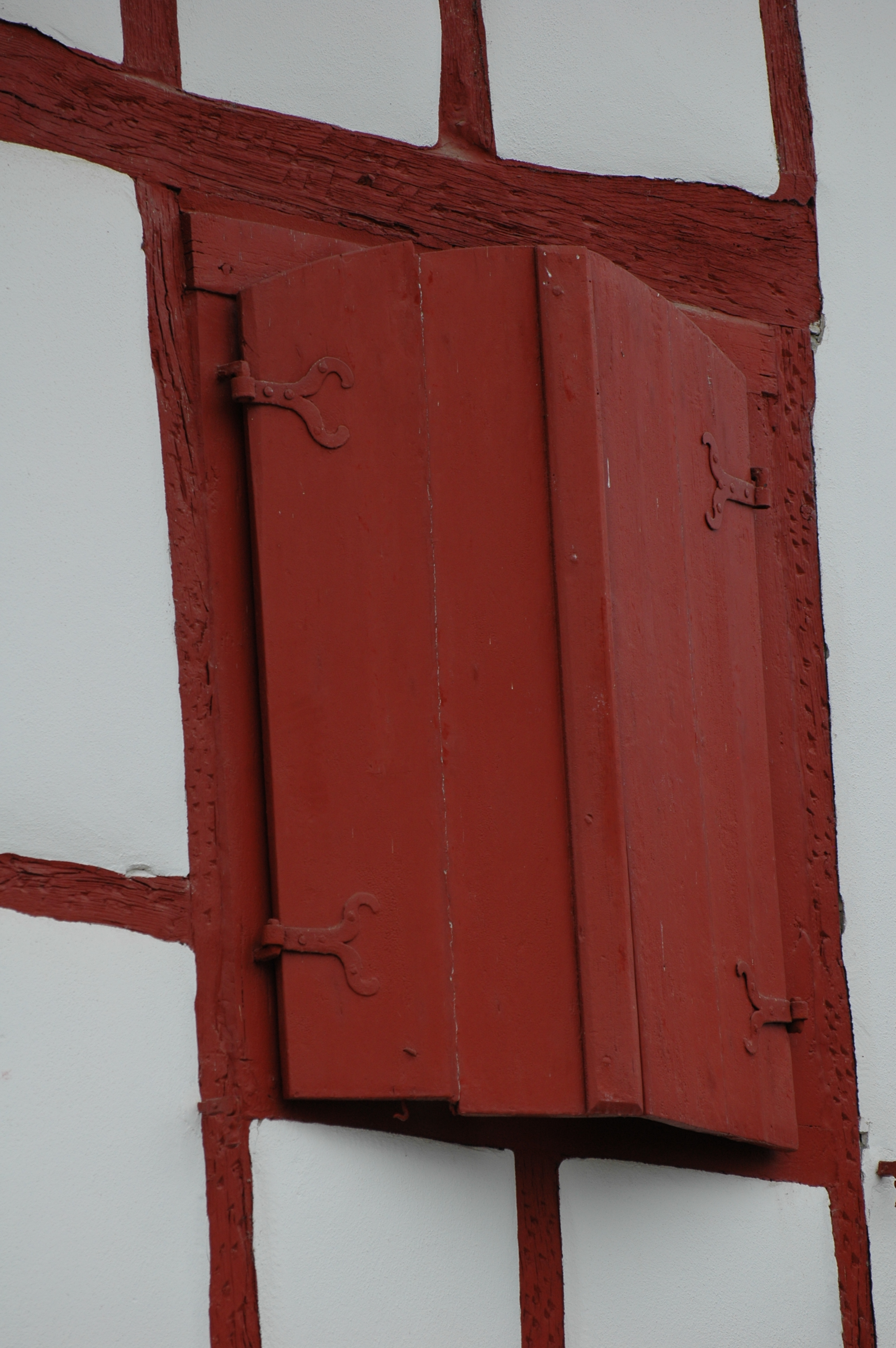
A window on a Lower Navarre house

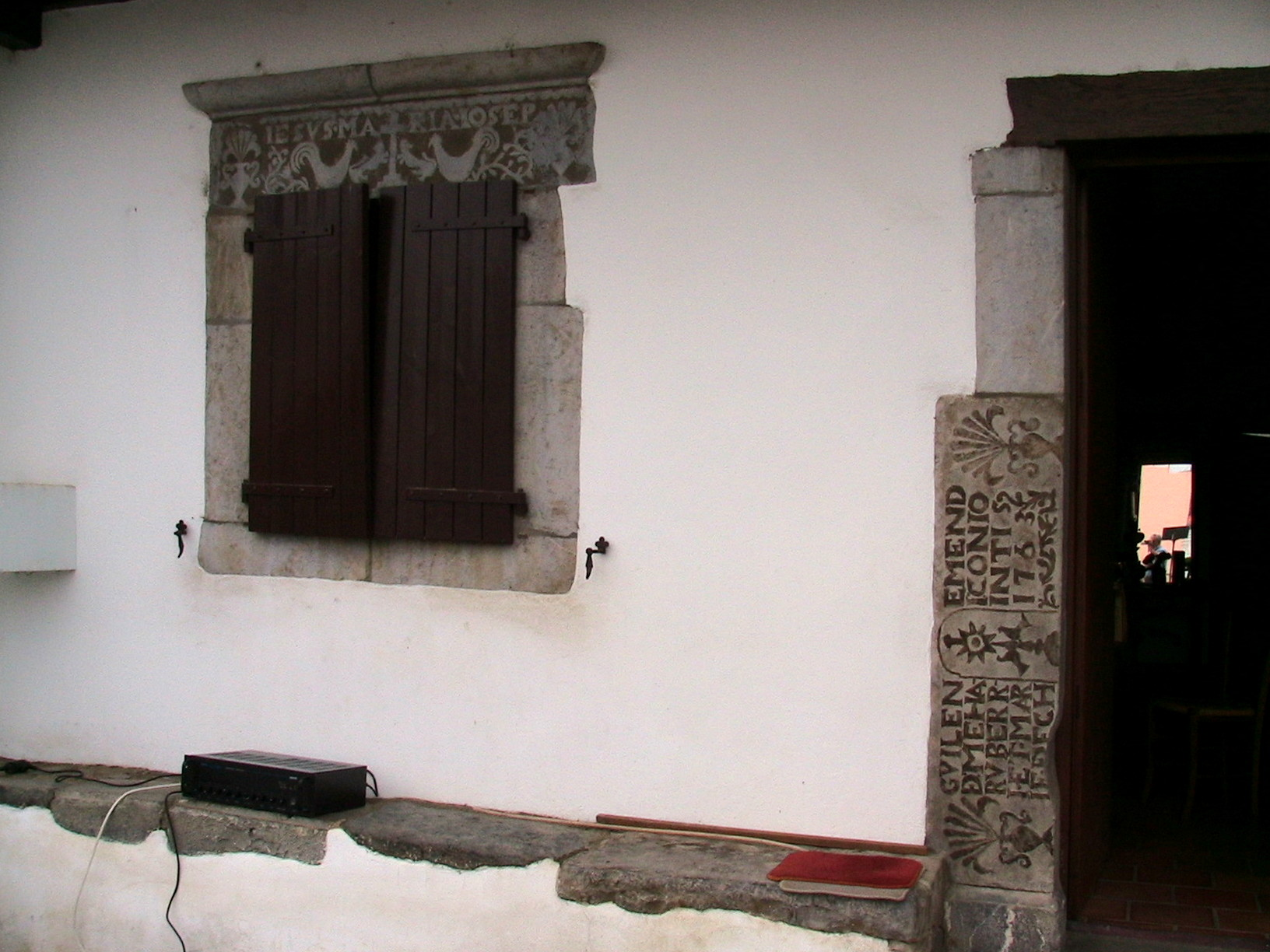
An Atalburu

=== Religious Heritage ===
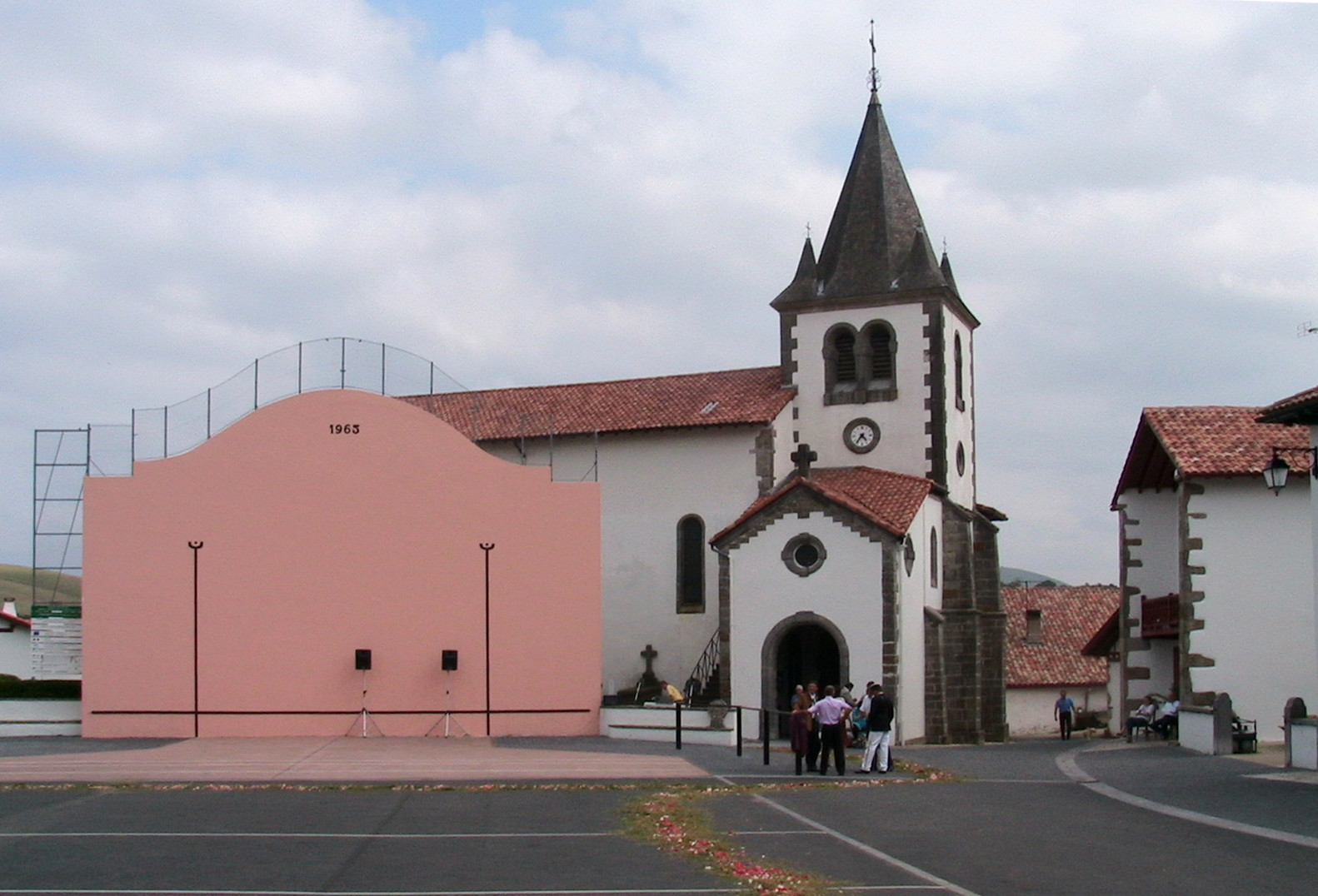
The Church of Saint Peter with the fronton

- The Parish Church of Saint Peter (17th century). Its cemetery contains many Hilarri:

=== Hilarri Picture Gallery ===
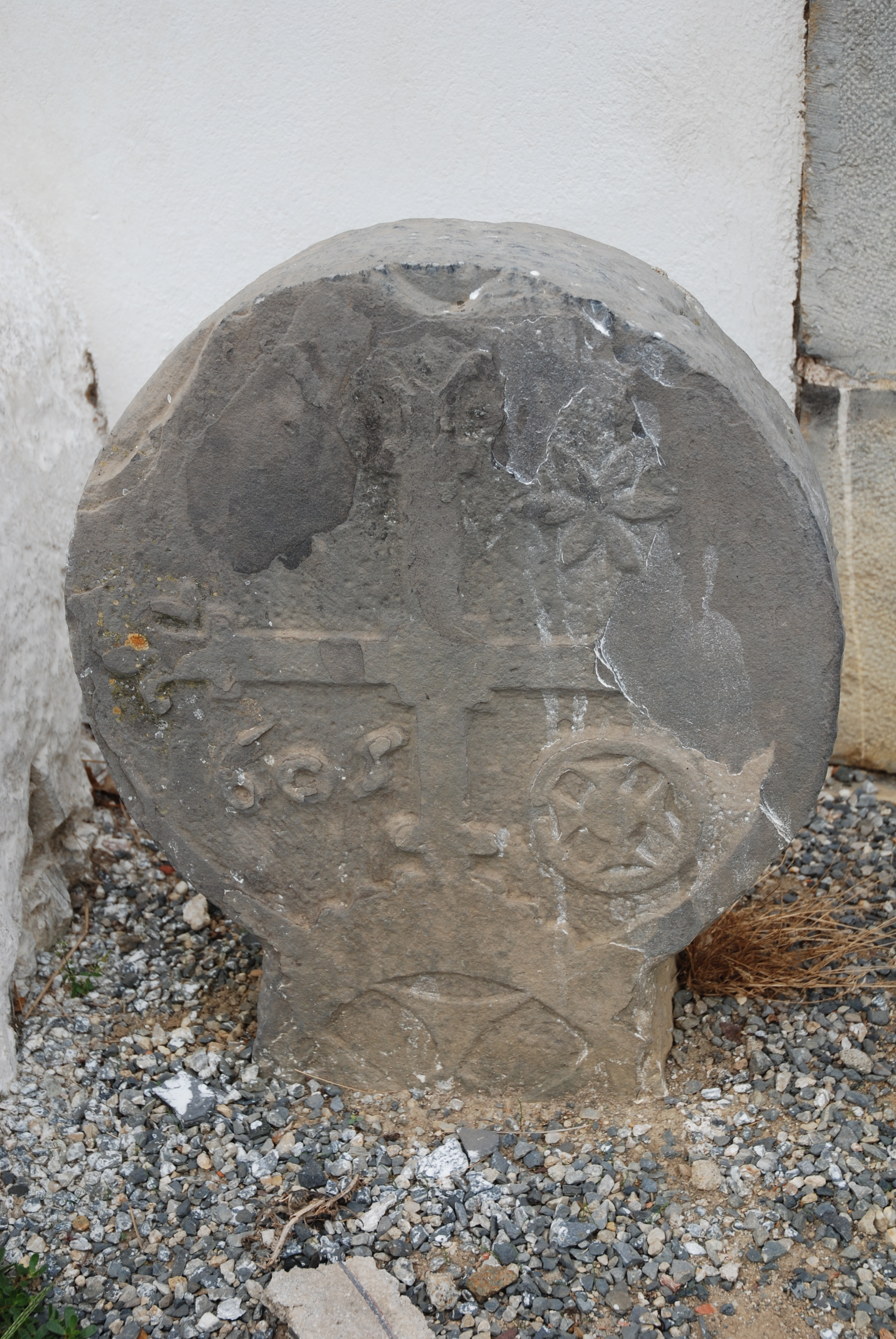

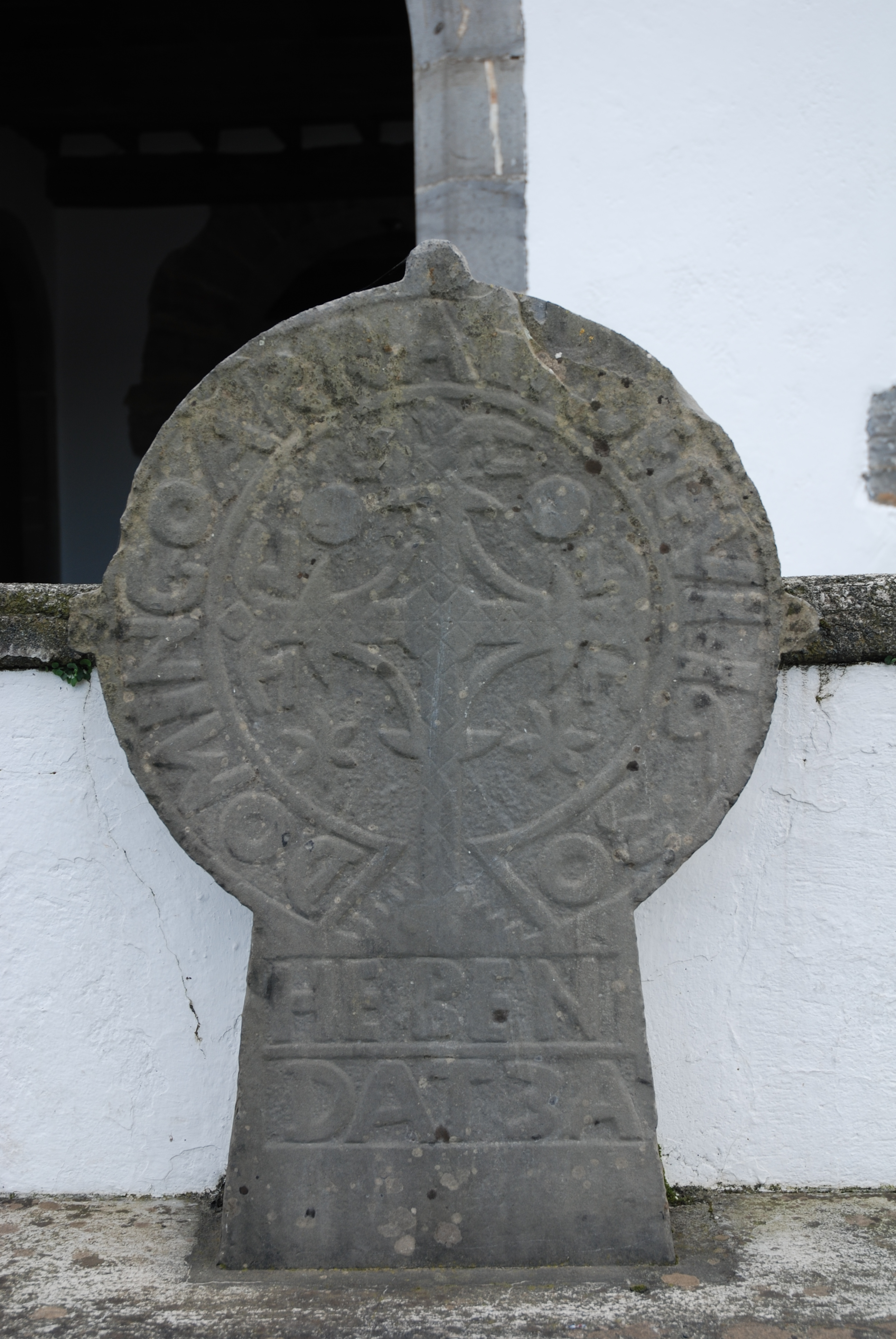

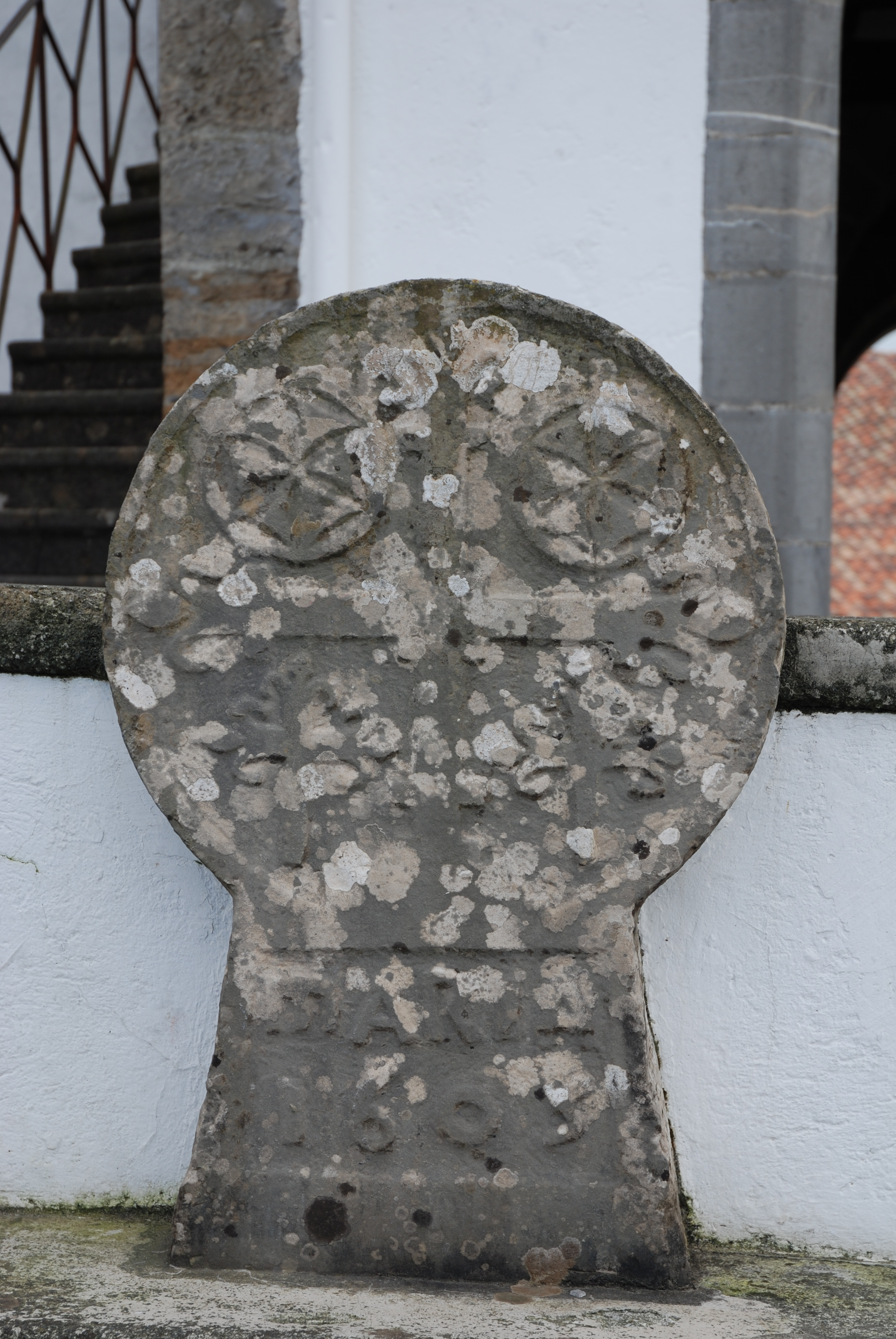

== Facilities ==
=== Education ===
The commune has a primary school.

== Notable people linked to the commune ==
- Bernard Renau d'Eliçagaray (Eñaut d'Elizagarai), called little Renau, born in 1652 at Armendarits and died in 1719, was a mathematician, Inspector General of the Navy, in 1689 author of the Theory of Operation of Vessels. He was especially famous for his Bomb vessels. The pastoral of Soule in 2007 (at Camou-Cihigue) was dedicated to him.

== See also ==
- Communes of the Pyrénées-Atlantiques department
