= Joyeuse (river) =

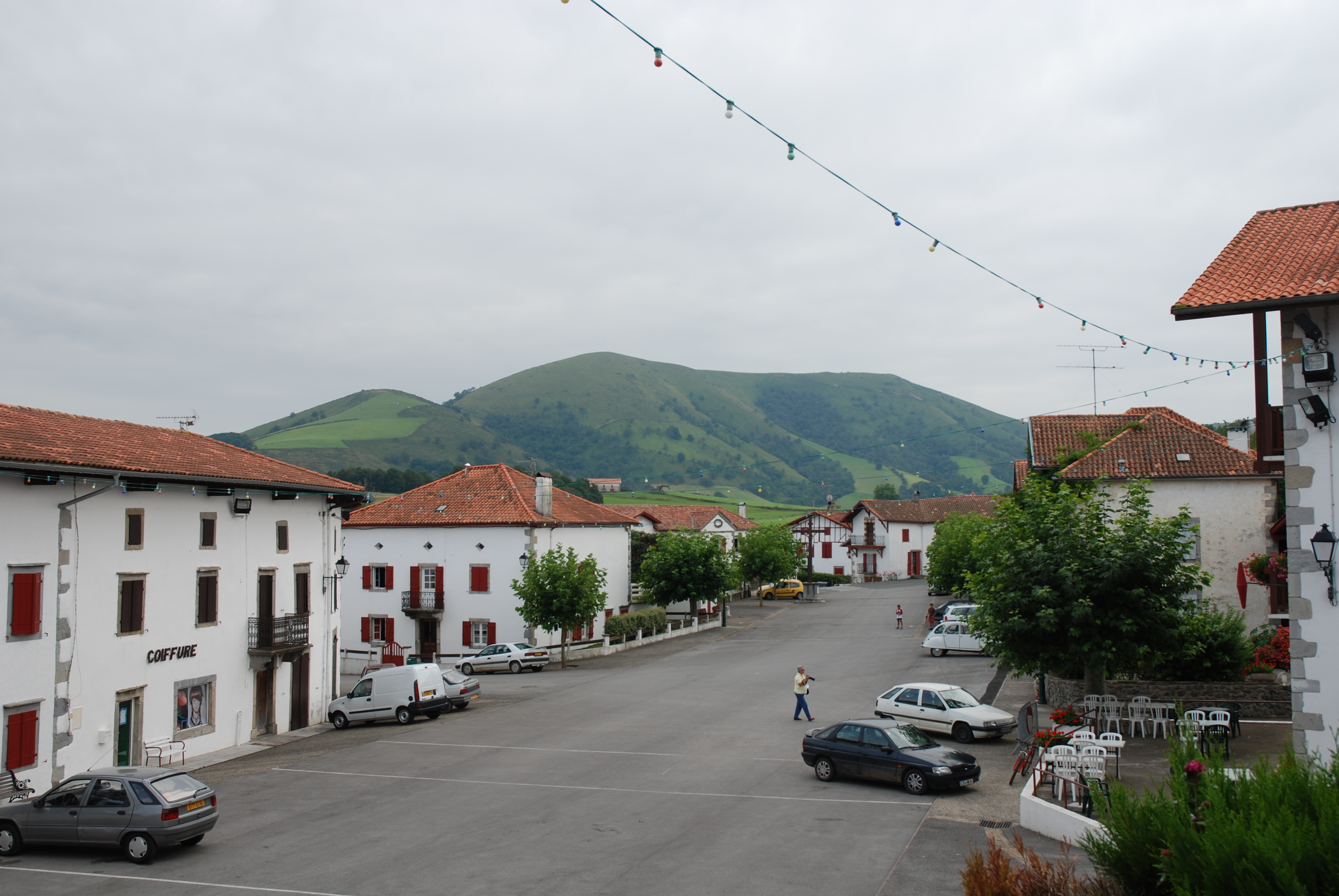

- Location within France Location within Nouvelle-Aquitaine

Location
- Country: France

Physical characteristics
- Source
  - location: Iholdy
- Mouth
  - location: Bidouze
  - coordinates: 43°21′13″N 1°1′34″W
- Length: 27 km (17 mi)

Basin features
- Progression: Bidouze→ Adour→ Atlantic Ocean

The Joyeuse (French pronunciation: [ʒwajøz]; Basque: Iholdiko erreka; Occitan: Jòia) is a left tributary of the Bidouze, in the French Basque Country (Pyrénées-Atlantiques), in the Southwest of France. It is 26.7 km (16.6 mi) long.

== Name ==
Its name Joyeuse, that applies also to the Aran and one of its tributaries, is in legend the name of the sword of Charlemagne. It was attributed after the battle of Roncevaux. At this time, many breaches or narrow passes in the Pyrenees were renamed in reference to Roland.

== Geography ==
The Joyeuse rises in Iholdy and flows into the Bidouze in Saint-Palais.

== Départements and towns ==
- Pyrénées-Atlantiques: Iholdy, Orsanco, Beyrie-sur-Joyeuse, Saint-Palais.

== Main tributaries ==
- Azkonbegiko erreka
