= Ostabarret =

Ostabarret (Basque: Oztibarre, Spanish: Ostabares) is a central region of the traditional province of Basse-Navarre in the far south of France. It corresponds to the valley of the upper reaches of the river Bidouze. It is hilly, open country, characterized by low mountains and round hills between 160 and 650 metres in elevation. The region takes its name from the village of Ostabat.

The region is first mentioned as the terra Ostabaressii in a document of the twelfth century. In one of 1247, it was called Ostavales. A Navarrese charter of 1305 refers to it as the terra Hostebarezio in Navarra. The forms Ostabarea (1312) and Hosta-Barisium (1351) are attested, while the Gascon Rolls use Ostaberesium (1361).

The region is predominantly Basque speaking. According to the 1968 census, 2,137 out of 2,188 inhabitants spoke Basque. The dialect was classified by Louis Lucien Bonaparte as Lower Navarrese in 1869.

== Sources ==
- Arozamena Ayala, Ainhoa. "Ostabarret, Tierra de". Auñamendi Eusko Entziklopedia.
