= Lacarre =

Lacarre Lakarra
- Commune
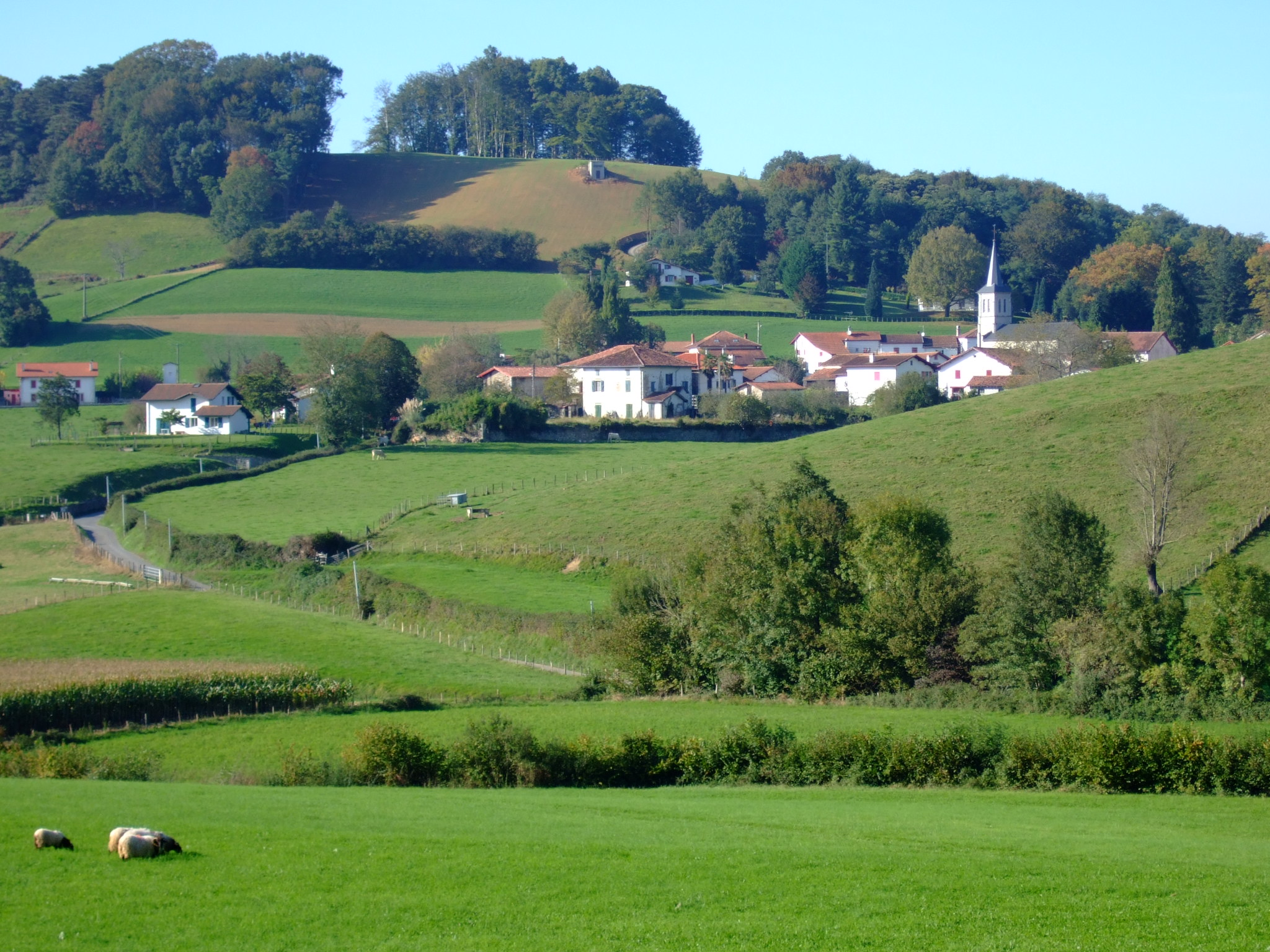
- A general view of Lacarre
- Location of Lacarre
- Location within France Location within Nouvelle-Aquitaine
- Coordinates: 43°11′28″N 1°09′47″W
- Country: France
- Region: Nouvelle-Aquitaine
- Department: Pyrénées-Atlantiques
- Arrondissement: Bayonne
- Canton: Montagne Basque
- Intercommunality: CA Pays Basque

Government
  - Mayor (2020–2026): Jean-Claude Ybargaray
- Area^{1}: 4.40 km^{2} (1.70 sq mi)
- Elevation: 333 m (1,093 ft)
- Highest elevation: 595 m (1,952 ft)
- Lowest elevation: 194 m (636 ft)
- Population (2023): 171
  - Density: 38.9/km^{2} (101/sq mi)
- Time zone: UTC+01:00 (CET)
  - Summer (DST): UTC+02:00 (CEST)
- INSEE/Postal code: 64297 /64220
- ^{1} French Land Register data, which excludes lakes, ponds, glaciers > 1 km^{2} (0.386 sq mi or 247 acres) and river estuaries.

Lacarre (French pronunciation: [lakaʁ]; Occitan: La Carrèra; Basque: Lakarra) is a commune in the Pyrénées-Atlantiques department in south-western France.

It is located in the former province of Lower Navarre.

== See also ==
- Communes of the Pyrénées-Atlantiques department
