= Saint-Jean-le-Vieux, Pyrénées-Atlantiques =

Saint-Jean-le-Vieux Donazaharre (Basque)
- Commune
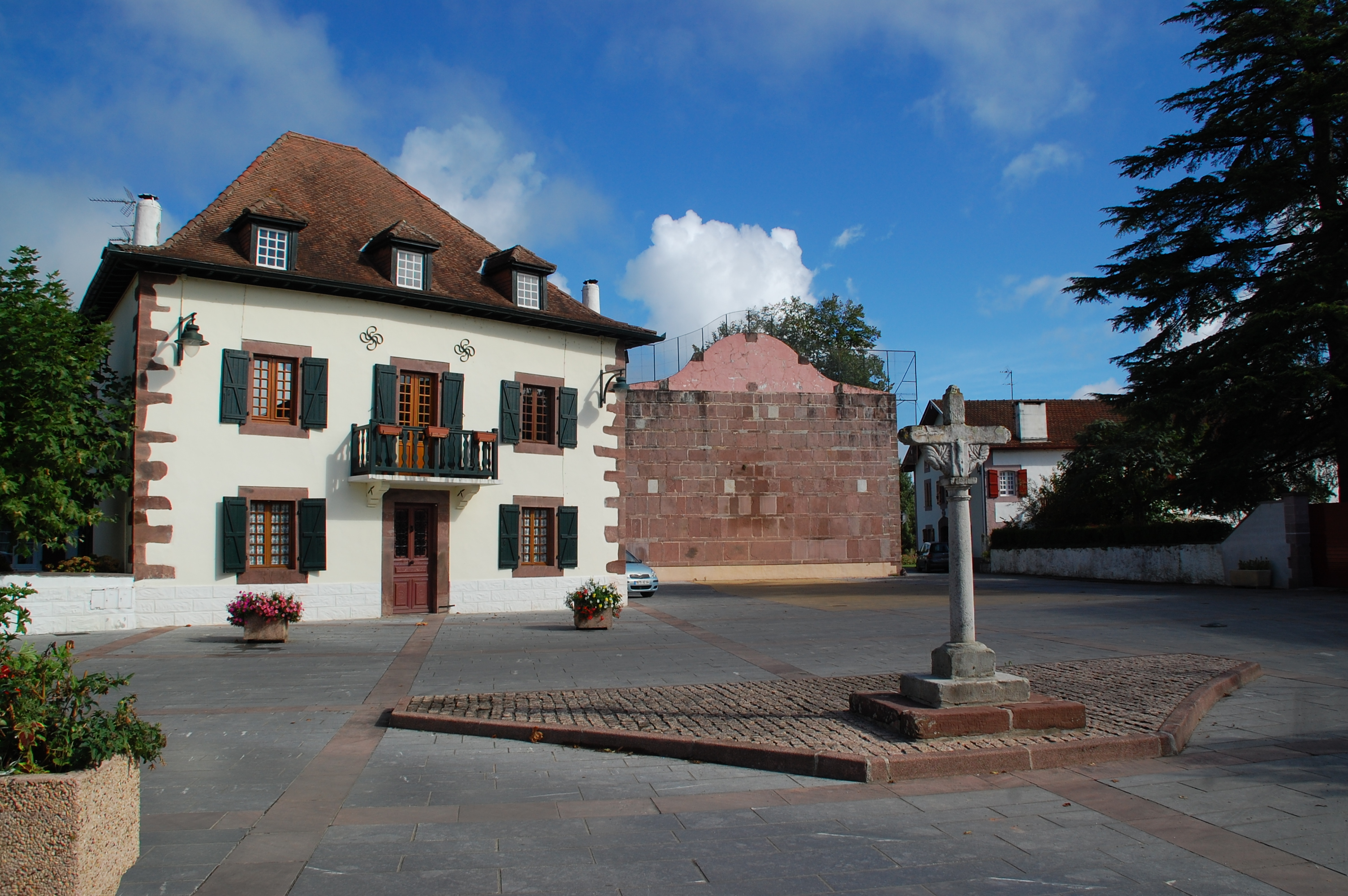
- The village square

- Coat of arms
- Location of Saint-Jean-le-Vieux
- Location within France Location within Nouvelle-Aquitaine
- Coordinates: 43°09′57″N 1°11′32″W
- Country: France
- Region: Nouvelle-Aquitaine
- Department: Pyrénées-Atlantiques
- Arrondissement: Bayonne
- Canton: Montagne Basque
- Intercommunality: CA Pays Basque

Government
  - Mayor (2020–2026): Pierre Eyherabide
- Area^{1}: 12 km^{2} (4.6 sq mi)
- Elevation: 235 m (771 ft)
- Highest elevation: 500 m (1,600 ft)
- Lowest elevation: 171 m (561 ft)
- Population (2023): 900
  - Density: 75/km^{2} (190/sq mi)
- Time zone: UTC+01:00 (CET)
  - Summer (DST): UTC+02:00 (CEST)
- INSEE/Postal code: 64484 /64220
- ^{1} French Land Register data, which excludes lakes, ponds, glaciers > 1 km^{2} (0.386 sq mi or 247 acres) and river estuaries.

Saint-Jean-le-Vieux (French pronunciation: [sɛ̃ ʒɑ̃ lə vjø]; Basque: Donazaharre; Occitan: Sant-Joan-lo-Ancian) is a commune in the Pyrénées-Atlantiques department in south-western France.

== History ==
The town of Saint-Jean-le-Vieux was razed to the ground in 1177 by the troops of Richard the Lionheart after a siege. The Kings of Navarre refounded the town at nearby Saint-Jean-Pied-de-Port as the regional capital shortly afterwards. Saint-Jean-le-Vieux was also resettled.

== See also ==
- Communes of the Pyrénées-Atlantiques department
