= Larceveau-Arros-Cibits =

Larceveau-Arros-Cibits Larzabale-Arroze-Zibitze
- Commune
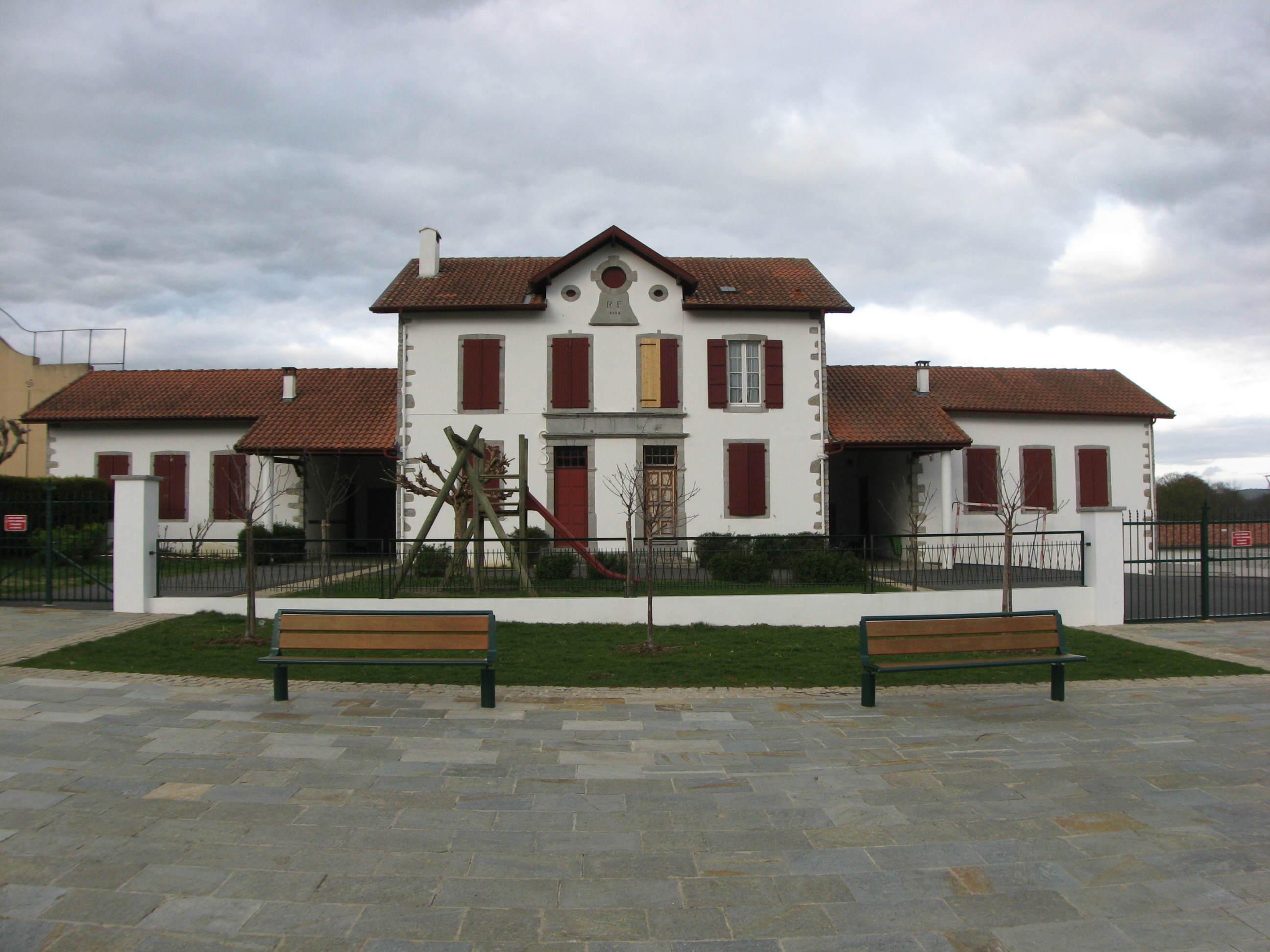
- The school of Larceveau

- Coat of arms
- Location of Larceveau-Arros-Cibits
- Location within France Location within Nouvelle-Aquitaine
- Coordinates: 43°14′00″N 1°05′41″W
- Country: France
- Region: Nouvelle-Aquitaine
- Department: Pyrénées-Atlantiques
- Arrondissement: Bayonne
- Canton: Pays de Bidache, Amikuze et Ostibarre
- Intercommunality: CA Pays Basque

Government
  - Mayor (2020–2026): Christele Caset-Urruty
- Area^{1}: 18.08 km^{2} (6.98 sq mi)
- Elevation: 249 m (817 ft)
- Highest elevation: 642 m (2,106 ft)
- Lowest elevation: 113 m (371 ft)
- Population (2023): 449
  - Density: 24.8/km^{2} (64.3/sq mi)
- Time zone: UTC+01:00 (CET)
  - Summer (DST): UTC+02:00 (CEST)
- INSEE/Postal code: 64314 /64120
- ^{1} French Land Register data, which excludes lakes, ponds, glaciers > 1 km^{2} (0.386 sq mi or 247 acres) and river estuaries.

Larceveau-Arros-Cibits (Basque: Larzabale-Arroze-Zibitze; Occitan: Larcerebel) is a commune in the Pyrénées-Atlantiques department in south-western France.

It is located in the former province of Lower Navarre.

== See also ==
- Communes of the Pyrénées-Atlantiques department
