= Iholdy =

Iholdy Iholdi
- Commune
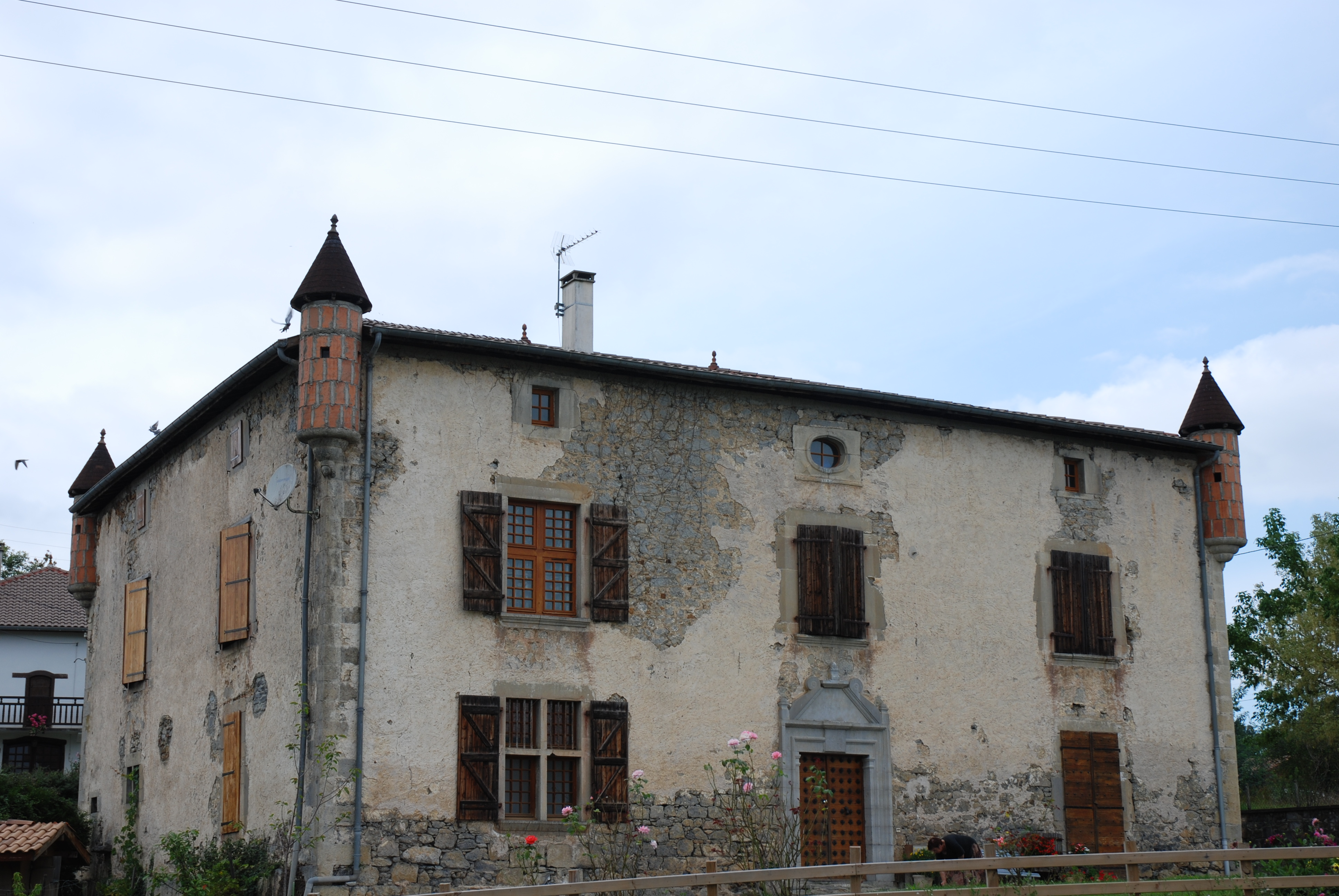
- Elizabelar Manor
- Location of Iholdy
- Location within France Location within Nouvelle-Aquitaine
- Coordinates: 43°16′59″N 1°10′48″W
- Country: France
- Region: Nouvelle-Aquitaine
- Department: Pyrénées-Atlantiques
- Arrondissement: Bayonne
- Canton: Pays de Bidache, Amikuze et Ostibarre
- Intercommunality: CA Pays Basque

Government
  - Mayor (2020–2026): Bernard Cachenaut
- Area^{1}: 21.63 km^{2} (8.35 sq mi)
- Elevation: 154 m (505 ft)
- Highest elevation: 577 m (1,893 ft)
- Lowest elevation: 109 m (358 ft)
- Population (2023): 550
  - Density: 25/km^{2} (66/sq mi)
- Time zone: UTC+01:00 (CET)
  - Summer (DST): UTC+02:00 (CEST)
- INSEE/Postal code: 64271 /64640
- ^{1} French Land Register data, which excludes lakes, ponds, glaciers > 1 km^{2} (0.386 sq mi or 247 acres) and river estuaries.

Iholdy (French pronunciation: [i.ɔldi]; Basque: Iholdi) is a commune in the Pyrénées-Atlantiques department in south-western France.

It is located in the former province of Lower Navarre.

== See also ==
- Communes of the Pyrénées-Atlantiques department
