= Aezkoa =

Administrative unit of Navarre, Spain

Coordinates: 42°58′N 01°14′W

Aezkoa Valley (in the context of Navarre)

Aezkoa Valley is an administrative unit of Navarre, Spain. It is formed by several smaller municipalities: Abaurregaina, Abaurrepea, Aria, Aribe (seat of the Valley administration), Garraioa, Garralda, Hiriberri (town), Orbaitzeta and Orbara.

The valley has c. 1200 people inscribed as residents but only around 800 live there regularly.

== Geography ==
Aezkoa valley encompasses the upper course of the Irati river, a territory full of oak and beech woods (60% of the land). The more mountainous fraction of it is known as the Irati Forest, that also extends into Lower Navarre. It has two natural reserves: Mendilatz, in the Irati Forest, and Truistuibartea. The upper Irati also has a reservoir known as Irabia reservoir, in the midst of Irati Forest.

Other points of interest are the ruins of the weapons' manufacture of Orbaizeta. Orbaizeta also has an accommodation and used to have a camping but it is now out of business. There are several megalithic monuments in the mountains north of the valley, that are part of the Pyrenees. Best known, maybe because it's easy access, is the dolmen of Urkuilu mountain.

== History ==
It is known that, before the consolidation of the Kingdom of Navarre in the 9th century, there was already a community in the valley that possibly was participant in the famous Battle of Roncevaux, not far away. The lineage of Abaurrea is the oldest one to be mentioned living in the valley.

Aezkoans also participated in the Battle of Navas de Tolosa in 1212. King Sancho the Wise improved the chart of the valley in 1229. In 1443 Aezkoa gained the control of its mountain passages. In 1462 the Valley gained collective gentry rights for all its inhabitants. Since then, all kings gave oath to respect the chart of the valley until 1609.

After Navarre was annexed by Castile, the valley suffered two persecutions for witchery. In 1525, soon after the consolidation of the Spanish conquest, 9 neighbours were burnt at the stake and many others died in prison or suffered tortures. In 1575 6 women of the valley were brought to Logroño accused of witchcraft, nothing was proven but 4 of them died because of the tortures.

In 1774, the valley suffered, together with other areas of northern Navarre, a massive epidemic that killed all its cattle. The war of 1793-95 against France caused much destruction in the valley. It was in this period when the weapons' manufacture of Orbaizeta was built(1784–94), employing more than 50 workers and being able to manufacture up to 3600 bombs per year. This manufacture was also affected by the Napoleonic and Carlist Wars in the 19th century.

In the 20th century the most important phenomenon is the rural exodus, caused by the crisis of the cattle-herding sector, that reduced its population to only c.1000 inhabitants.

== Basque language and dialect ==
The Basque sub-dialect of the valley, known as Aezkera, belongs to the High Navarrese dialect but it has strong influence from Lower Navarrese and specially nearby subdialect of Salazar Valley. It used to be a Basque-speaking valley before the fascist coup of 1936, nowadays Basque-speakers are estimated to be around 40% of the inhabitants. Though the dialect is still alive, its situation is extremely delicate.

The vast majority of children go nowadays to Basque-speaking schools, which is helping to revive the traditional language of the valley.
