= Navianos de Alba =

Coordinates: 41°44′32″N 5°55′06″W

Navianos de Alba, Spain
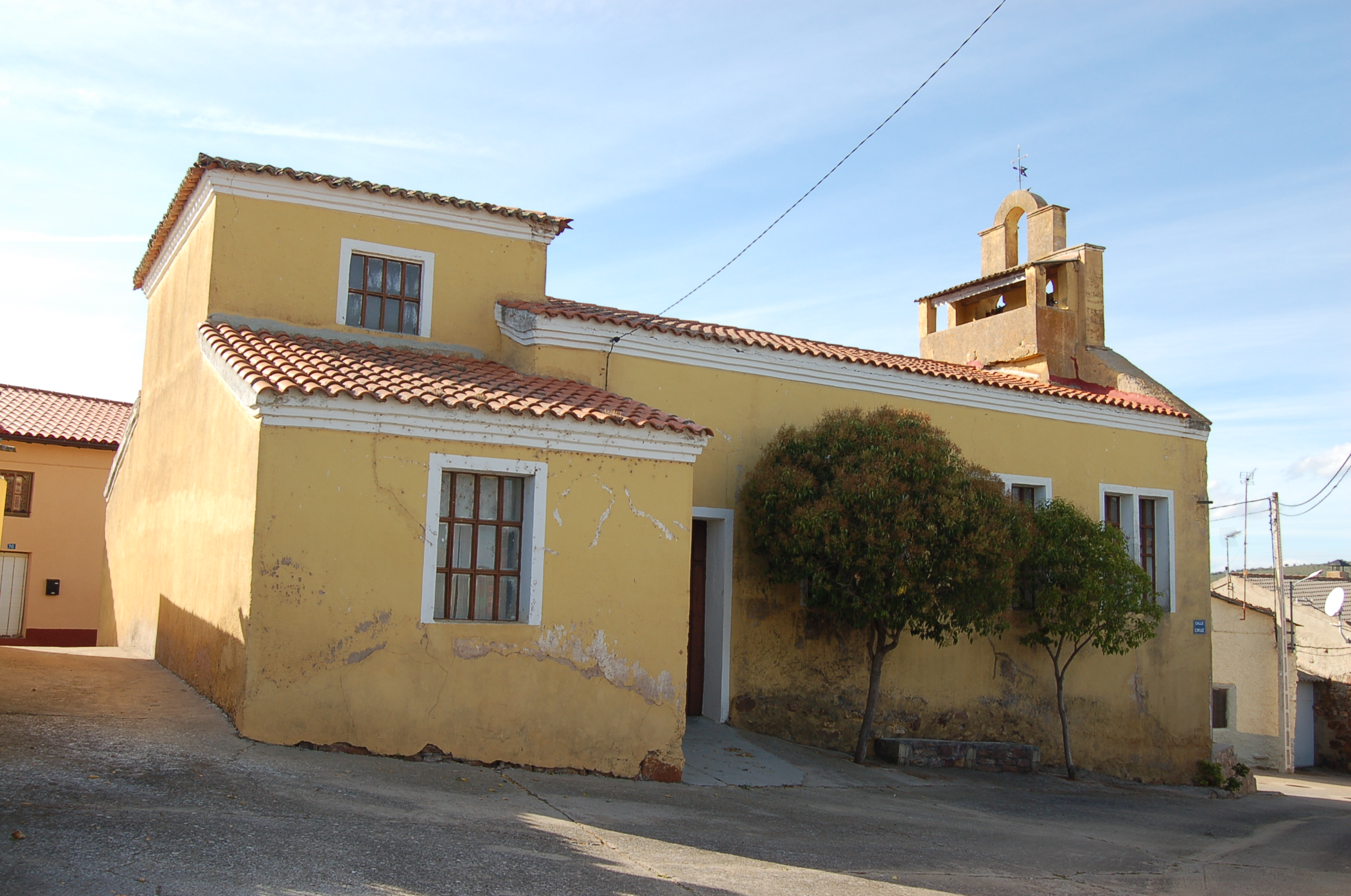
- Interactive map of Navianos de Alba, Spain
- Country: Spain
- Autonomous community: Castile and León
- Province: Zamora
- Comarca: Tierra de Alba
- Mancomunidad: Tierra de Tábara
- Town hall: Olmillos de Castro

Population (2020)
  - Total: 18
- Time zone: UTC+1 (CET)
  - Summer (DST): UTC+2 (CEST)

Navianos de Alba is a village located in the province of Zamora, Castile and León, Spain. According to the 2020 census (INE), the village had a population of 18 inhabitants. The postal code of the place is 49146.

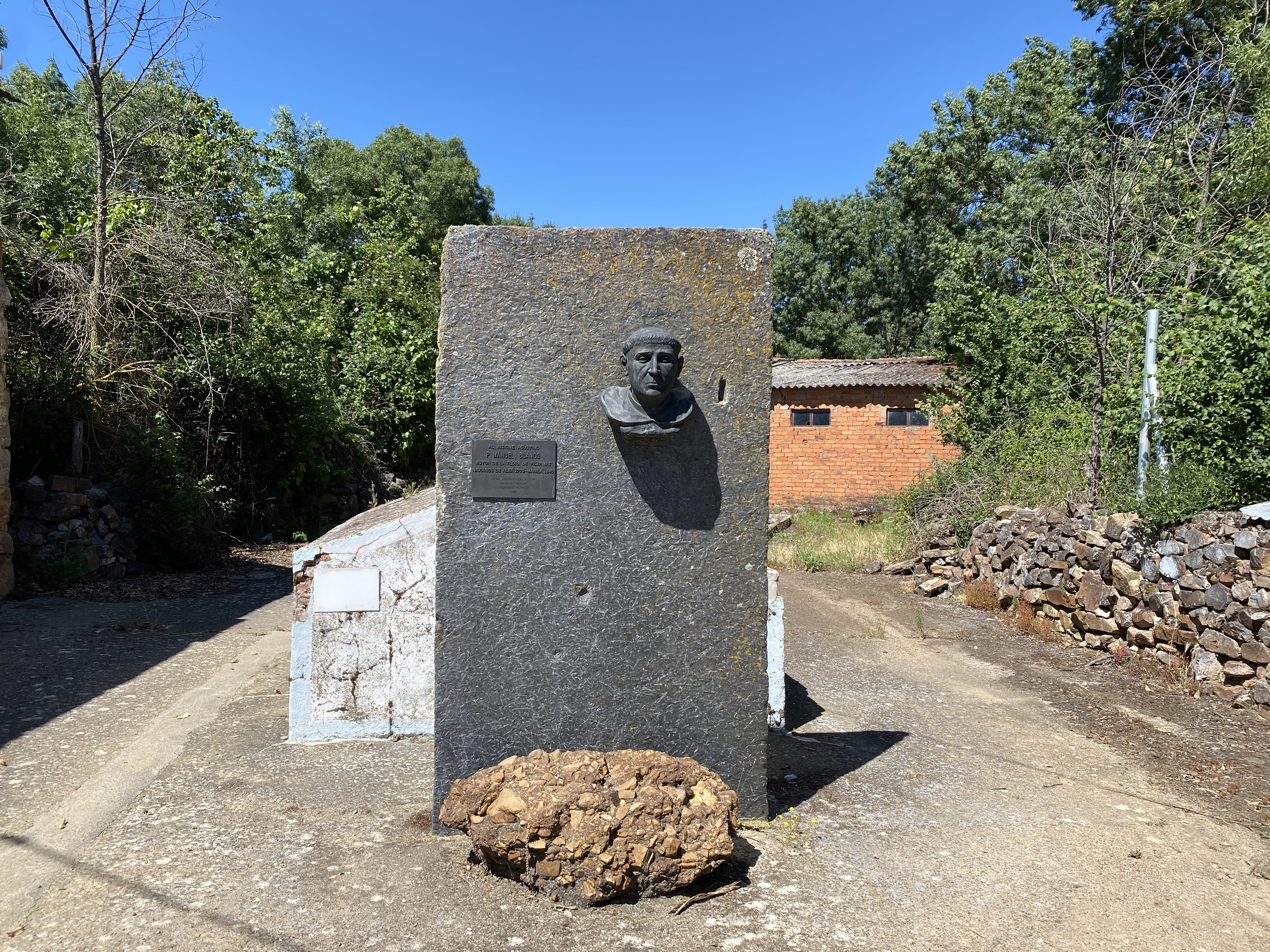
Bust of Manuel Blanco in Navianos de Alba, his hometown.

== Town hall ==
Olmillos de Castro is home to the town hall of 4 villages:

- San Martín de Tábara (72 inhabitants, INE 2020).
- Olmillos de Castro (63 inhabitants, INE 2020).
- Marquiz de Alba (59 inhabitants, INE 2020).
- Navianos de Alba (18 inhabitants, INE 2020).

== Manuel Blanco ==
It is the hometown of Manuel Blanco Ramos, one of the most important Spanish scientists of the 19th century.

Born in 1779, son of the navianos peasants Pedro Blanco and Petronila Ramos, this Augustinian father was a missionary in the Philippines with botanical discoveries that have gone down in the history of biology. He died in Manila in 1845. He was the author of the work Flora de Filipinas.

The scientist Carl Ludwig Blume dedicated him by placing his surname in the genus Blancoa of the Palmae family. John Lindley named the Blancoa canescens of the Haemodoraceae family with his surname.
