= Izal =

Izal may refer to:

- Izal or Iaal, a village in Lebanon
- Izal or Itzalle, a municipality in the Salazar Valley, Spain
- Izal (band), a former Spanish indie music group
- Izal, a disinfectant, a "medicated toilet paper", and other products made by Newton, Chambers & Co.
