= Arburua =

Arburua is a Navarre surname of Etxalar, Pamplona, Spain.

According to data from the Spanish National Statistical Institute (INE), as of 2017 Arburua occupies position #18425 in the list of Spanish surnames; a total of 158 people had the name as their initial last name, and 194 their second. In Navarre, 86 residents have Arburua as a first surname, and 111 as a second.

== Religious monument ==
The Basilica of Our Lady of Arburua, located in Izal and known for its long nave, was built at the end of the 16th century and the beginning of the 17th.

== Notable people named Arburua ==
- Juan Larramendi Arburua, Spanish singer, poet and painter
- Manuel Arburúa de la Miyar (1902–1981), Minister of Trade of Spain
- Marcelino Oreja Arburúa, Spanish politician and businessman
