= Igal, Navarre =

Coordinates: 42°49′N 1°04′W

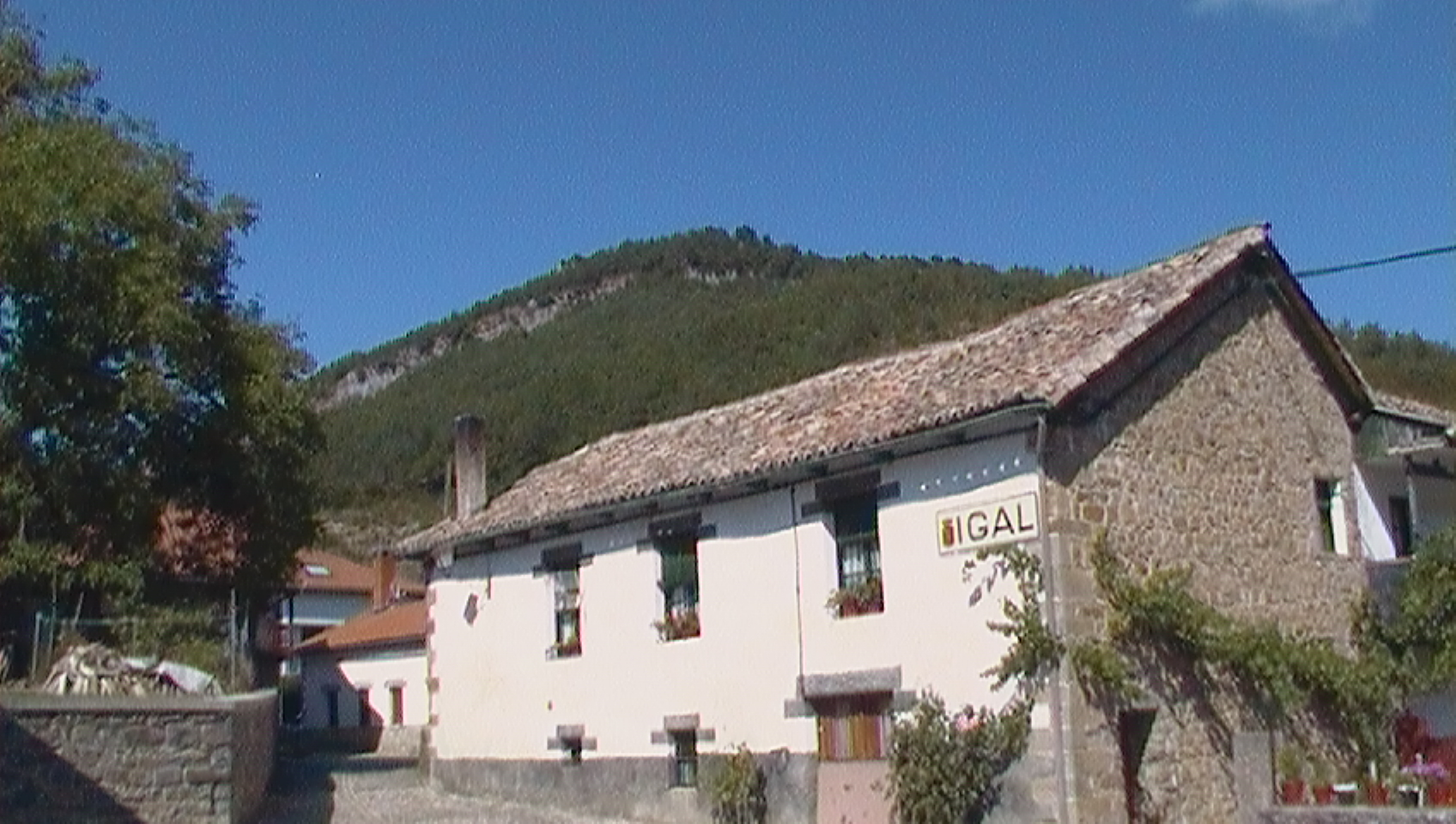
Igal

Igal (Basque: Igari) is a town located in Valley of Salazar, located in the province and Foral Community of Navarre, northern Spain, in Güesa municipality. The Instituto Nacional de Estadística (Spain) combines the population totals of Igal with neighboring Güesa, which in 2022 was a total of 34 inhabitants.

In 1845, after Salazar subdivision in municipalities, along with Ripalda, had their own council, however, after other reforms, both cities were built in the municipality of Güesa, becoming a council Igal.

Igal is located a few kilometers away from river of Salazar, and is in the path between Vidángoz (Roncal) and Güesa (Salazar), closer to the edge of town.

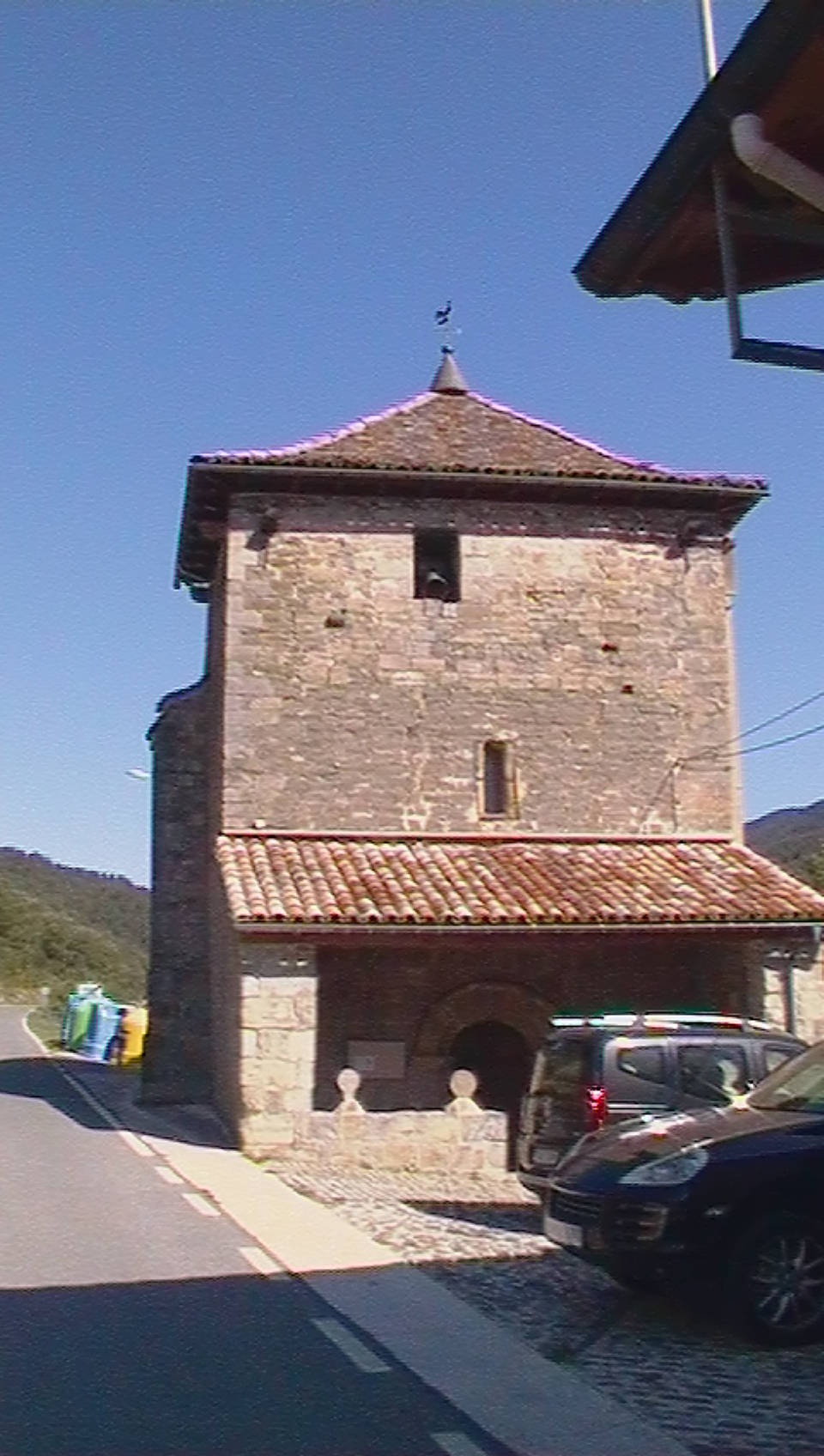
Igal - St. Vicent

The appearance of the town is rural with Gothic elements, like many buildings of the valley, highlighted in Igal, the parish of St. Vicent, which gives its name to the town's main street, and the possible existence of a monastery of the order of St. Benedict, which was visited by St. Eulogius (ca. 848).
