= Irati Forest =

Forest in Spain and France

Coordinates: 43.0000°N 1.0833°W

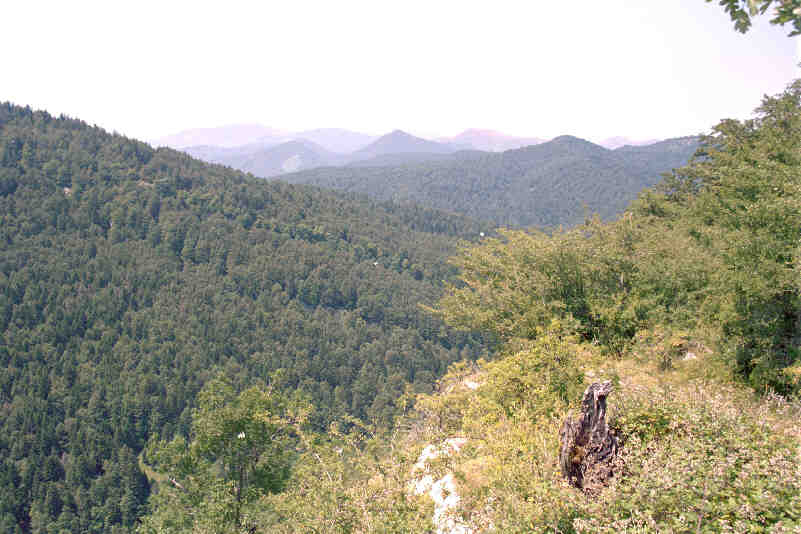
Irati Forest

The Irati Forest (Basque: Iratiko oihana; French: Forêt d'Iraty; French pronunciation: [fɔʁɛ diʁati] Spanish: Selva de Irati), found in the western Pyrenees, covers 17,300 ha (43,000 acres) of the Navarre region, astride on the Soule (Larrau) and Lower Navarre (Mendive and Lecumberry) provinces (French Basque Country) and Navarre (Spanish Basque Country), framed by Mount Okabe (1,466 m) and Pic d'Orhy (2,017 m).

It is the second largest and best preserved mixed beech-fir forest in Europe.

== History ==
Located in a low populated area, it contains in itself many old Basque legends.

The access route was only built in 1964.

== Toponymy ==
Its name comes from the Irati river, which crops up from the meeting of the Urtxuria and Urbeltza.

== Flora and fauna ==
For the most part, the Irati Forest shares the flora and fauna of the Pyrenees. Birds found in the area include goldcrests, chaffinches, robins, black woodpeckers, and white-backed woodpeckers. Notable mammals include foxes, wild boar, martens, and roe deer. Smaller mammals include the red vole, gray dormouse, and shrew, as well as the polecat and badger.
The primary tree species are beech and silver fir.The forest is also home to linden, hazelnut, elm, willow, maple, boxwood, and juniper trees, and rarely yew. Other plants are ferns, lichens, moss, and sloe, and well as rare herbaceous plants such as narcissus and winter bell. Solitary oaks, which used to be more common in the region, are still found in the area.
Despite being an intervened forest, it maintains a high degree of maturity, with a high diversity of environments that encompasses forests, wetlands, montane and subalpine meadows of the cervico (Nardus stricta), rocky, moor and scrubland, the Atlantic heaths with blueberry and argoma (Ulex gallii) or gorse (Genista hispanica subsp. occidentalis).

== Gallery ==
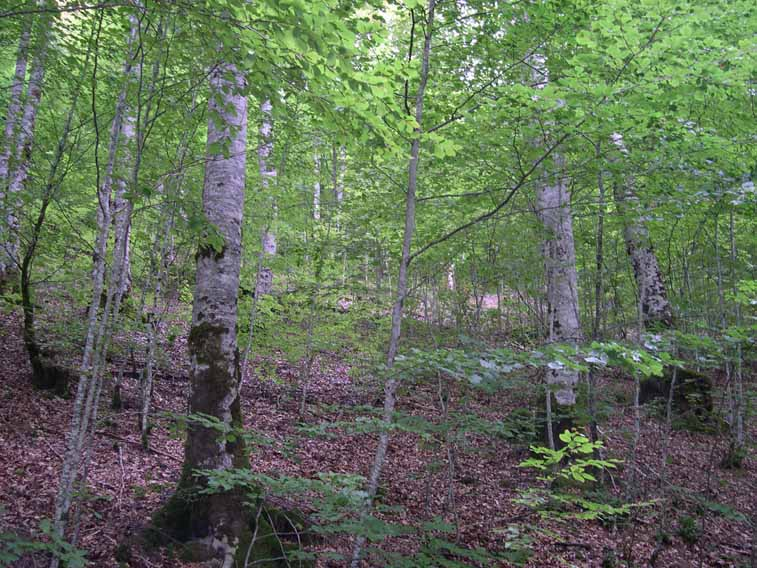
Sub-wood

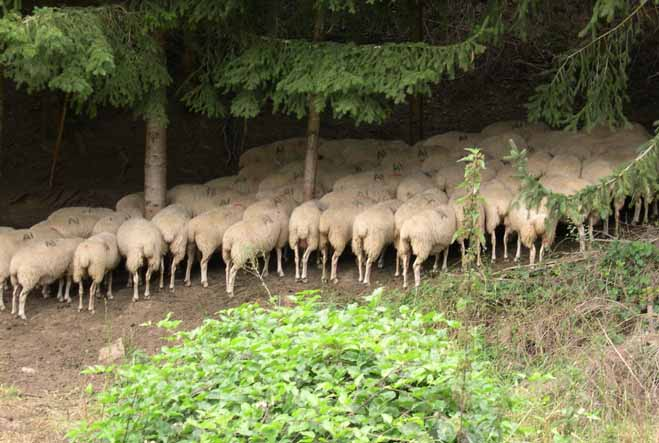
« La siesta del borrego » - Ochagavía

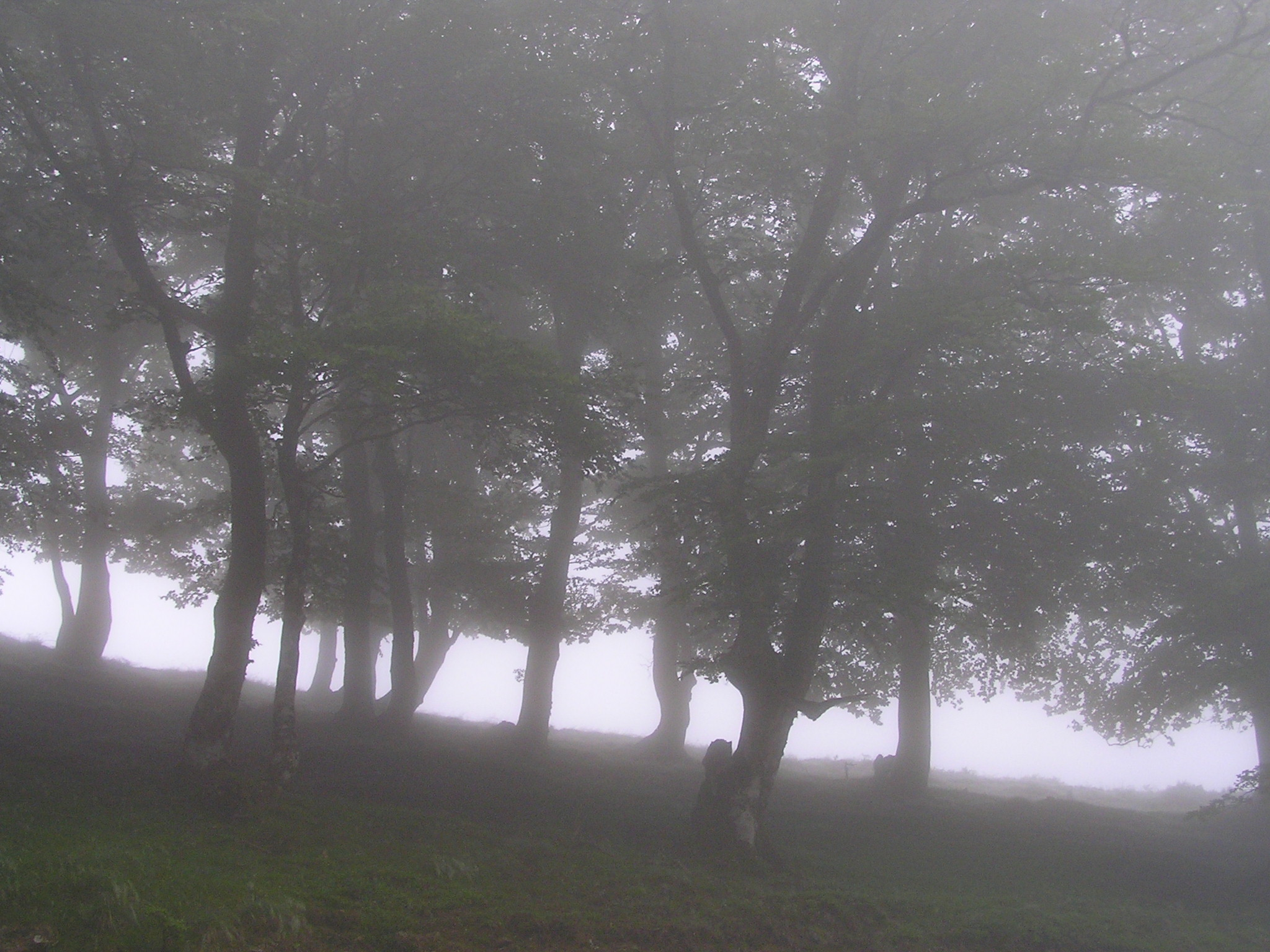
Mist
