= Ochagavía – Otsagabia =

Town and municipality in northern Spain

Coordinates: 42°55′N 1°05′W

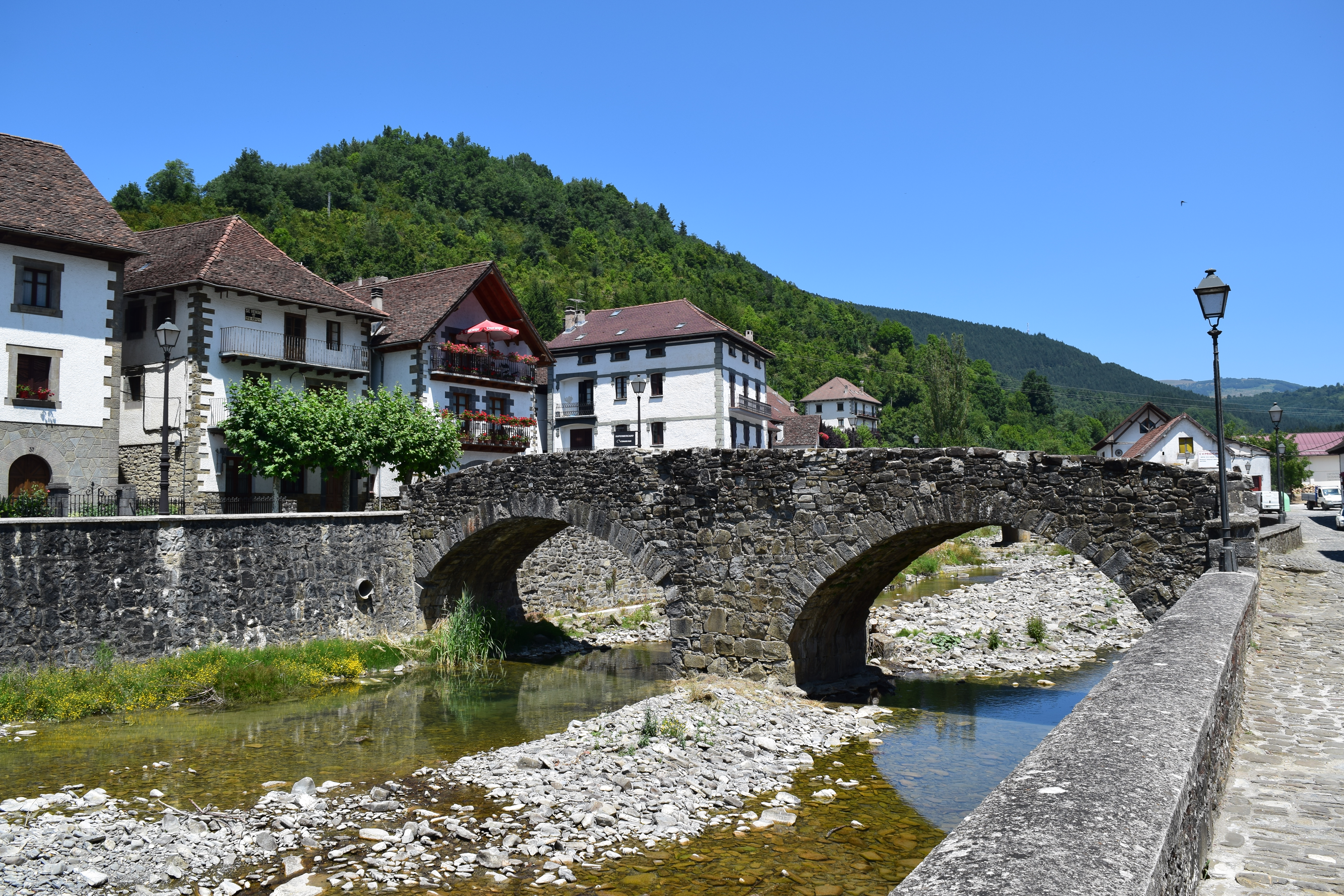

Ochagavía (Spanish: [otʃaɣaˈβi.a]) or Otsagabia (Basque: [ots̺aɣaβi.a]; also Otsagi) is a town and municipality in the province and autonomous community of Navarre, northern Spain. It is situated in the north of the Valley of Salazar, near the Irati Forest and not far from the border with France.
