= San Martín de Tábara =

Coordinates: 41°45′23″N 5°59′0″W

San Martín de Tábara, Spain
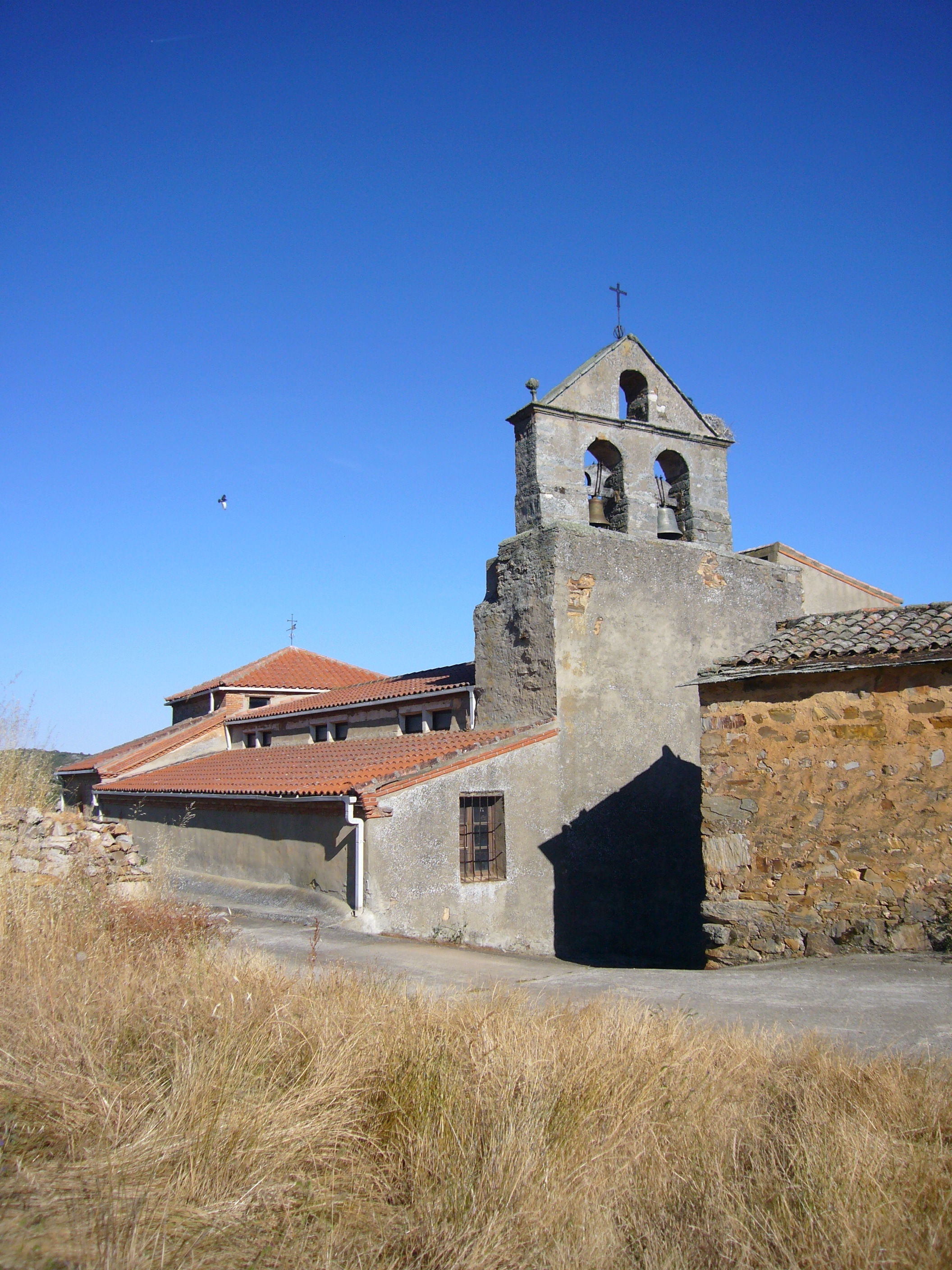
- Interactive map of San Martín de Tábara, Spain
- Country: Spain
- Autonomous community: Castile and León
- Province: Zamora
- Comarca: Tierra de Tábara
- Mancomunidad: Tierra de Tábara
- Town hall: Olmillos de Castro

Area
  - Total: 28.52 km^{2} (11.01 sq mi)
- Elevation: 748 m (2,454 ft)

Population (2024)
  - Total: 68
  - Density: 2.4/km^{2} (6.2/sq mi)
- Time zone: UTC+1 (CET)
  - Summer (DST): UTC+2 (CEST)

San Martín de Tábara is a village located in the province of Zamora, Castile and León, Spain. According to the 2020 census (INE), the village had a population of 72 inhabitants.

It is one of the most historic towns in western Zamora, where an important San Martín monastery was located in the 10th century. In 1850, the town hall moved to Olmillos de Castro to save money.

== Town hall ==
Olmillos de Castro is home to the town hall of 4 villages:

- San Martín de Tábara (72 inhabitants, INE 2020).
- Olmillos de Castro (63 inhabitants, INE 2020).
- Marquiz de Alba (59 inhabitants, INE 2020).
- Navianos de Alba (18 inhabitants, INE 2020).
