= Olmillos de Castro =

Place in Castile and León, Spain

Coordinates: 41°44′N 5°58′W

Olmillos de Castro, Spain
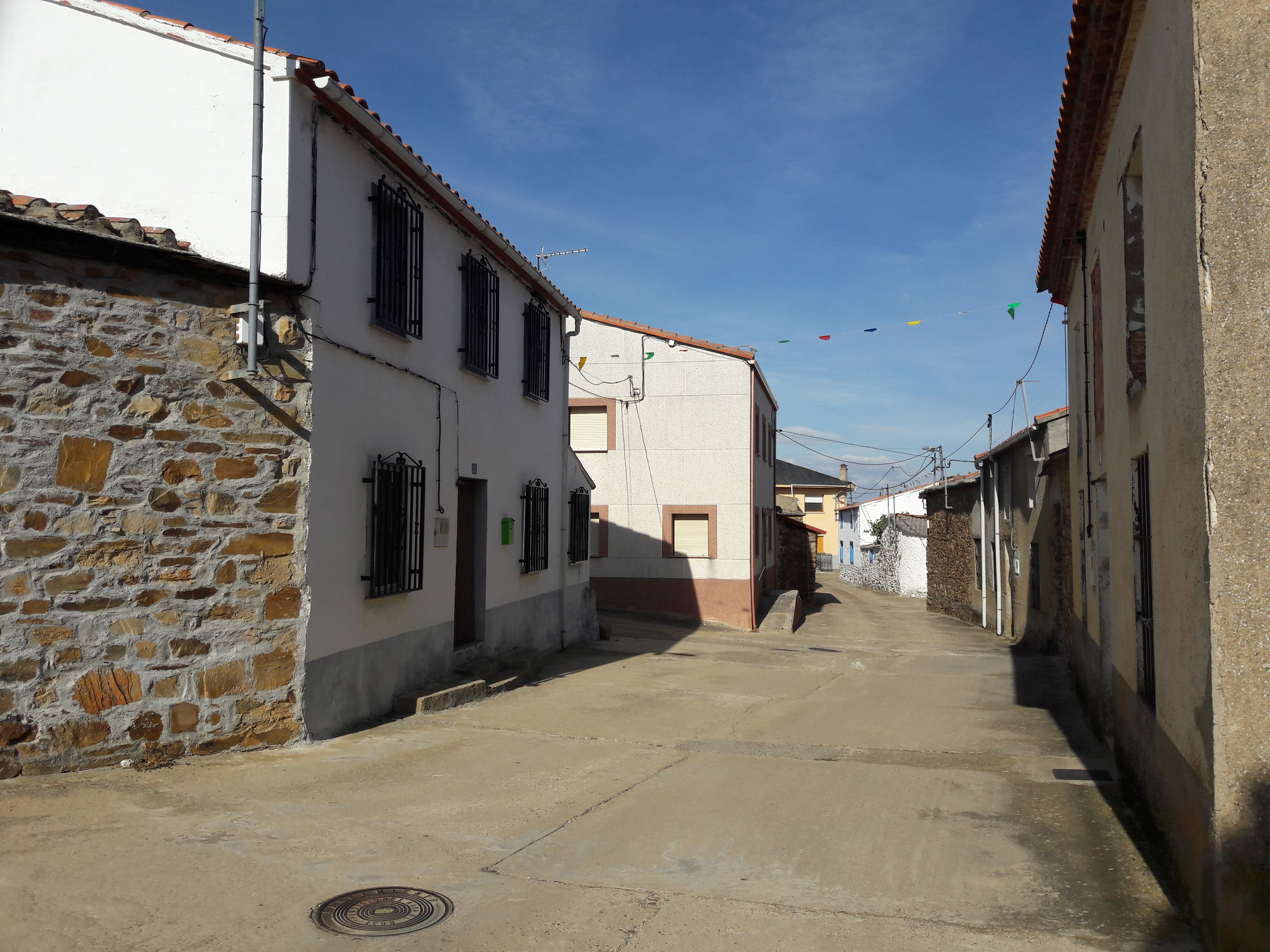
- Interactive map of Olmillos de Castro, Spain
- Country: Spain
- Autonomous community: Castile and León
- Province: Zamora
- Municipality: Olmillos de Castro

Area
  - Total: 71.39 km^{2} (27.56 sq mi)
- Elevation: 765 m (2,510 ft)

Population (2025-01-01)
  - Total: 182
  - Density: 2.55/km^{2} (6.60/sq mi)
- Time zone: UTC+1 (CET)
  - Summer (DST): UTC+2 (CEST)

Olmillos de Castro is a municipality located in the province of Zamora, Castile and León, Spain. According to the 2004 census (INE), the municipality had a population of 378 inhabitants.

== Town hall ==
Olmillos de Castro is home to the town hall of 4 towns, because Olmillos is the central point between the 4 towns. The towns are the following:

- San Martín de Tábara (72 inhabitants, INE 2020).
- Olmillos de Castro (63 inhabitants, INE 2020).
- Marquiz de Alba (59 inhabitants, INE 2020).
- Navianos de Alba (18 inhabitants, INE 2020).
