= Manuel Blanco Ramos =

Spanish friar and botanist

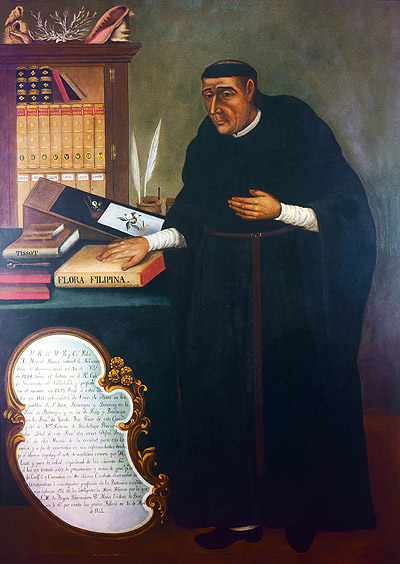
Blanco painted by Philippine painter Juan Arzeo 1845

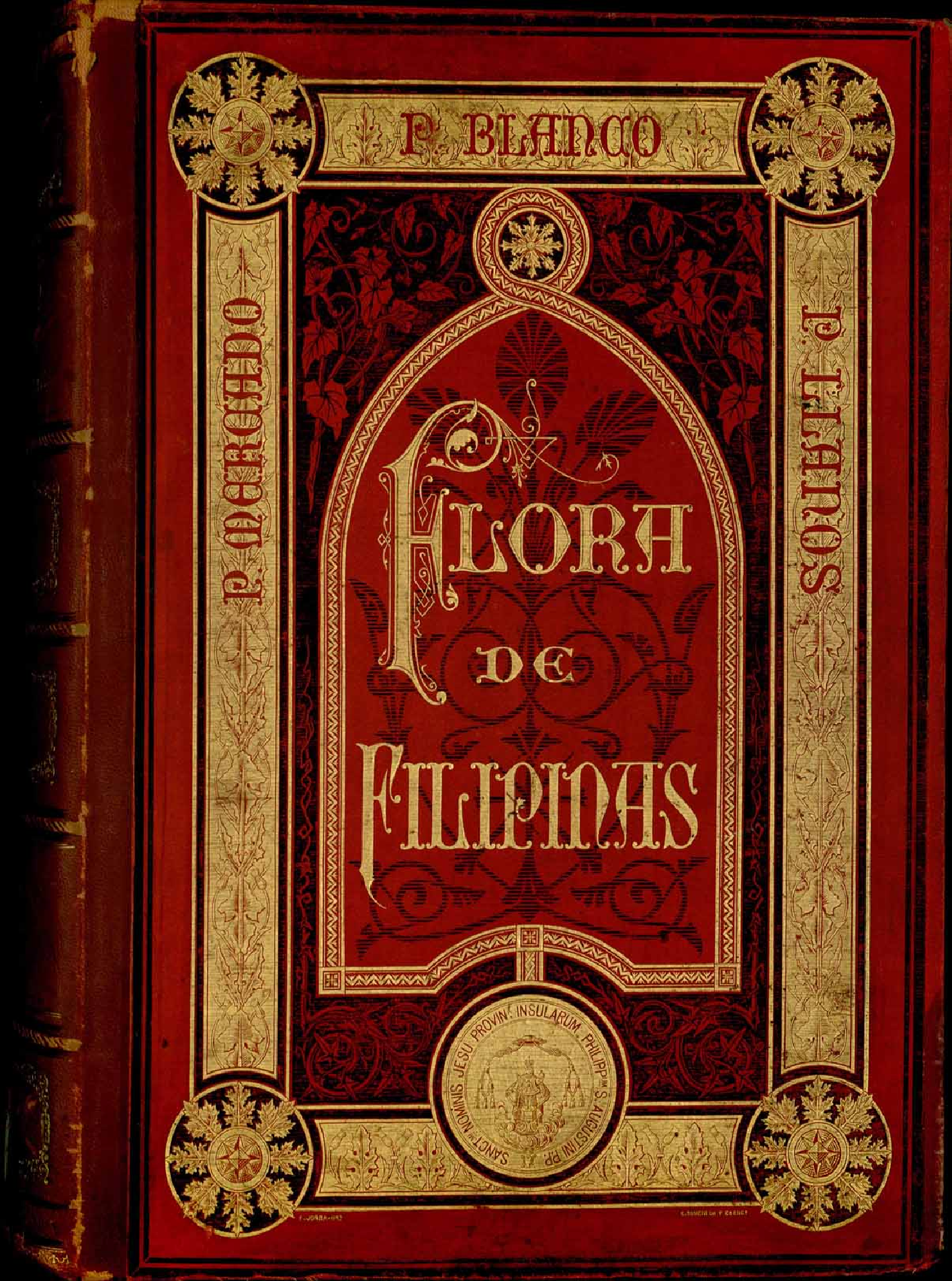
Illustrated edition of Flora de Filipinas, 1877–1883

Manuel María Blanco Ramos known as Manuel Blanco (November 24, 1778 – April 1, 1845) was a Spanish friar and botanist.

== Biography ==
Born in Navianos de Alba, Castilla y León, Spain, Blanco was a member of the Augustinian order of friars. His first assignment was in Angat in the province of Bulacan in the Philippines. He subsequently had a variety different assignments.

Towards the end of his life, he became the delegate of his order in Manila, traveling throughout the archipelago. He is the author of one of the first comprehensive flora of the Philippines, Flora de Filipinas. Según el sistema de Linneo (Flora of the Philippines according to the system of Linnaeus) which followed after the work done by Georg Joseph Kamel. The first two editions (Manila, 1837 and 1845) were unillustrated. Celestine Fernandez Villar (1838-1907), together with others including Antonio Llanos, published an illustrated posthumous edition from 1877 to 1883, printed by C. Verdaguer of Barcelona.

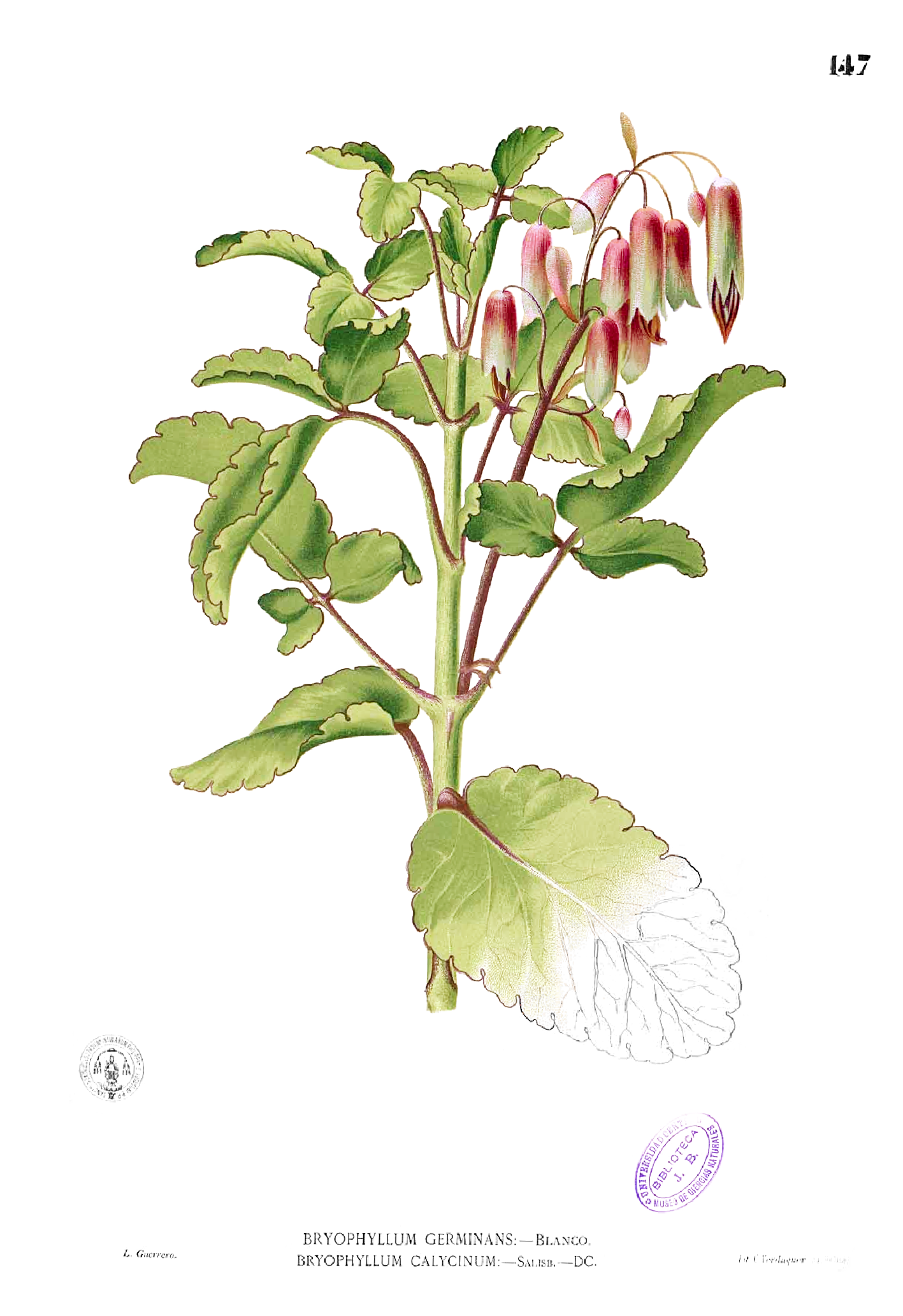
Kalanchoe pinnata illustrated in Blanco's Flora de Filipinas

Blanco died in Manila in 1845. In 1918 the botanist Elmer Drew Merrill published an exsiccata named Species Blancoanae which was devoted to species described by Blanco. The botanist Carl Ludwig Blume (1789-1862) named the genus Blancoa of the family Palmae in his honor. Citrus reticulata Blanco

For example, Citrus reticulata Blanco (mandarin orange).

== Books ==
- Flora de Filipinas. Según el sistema sexual de Linneo, Manila: 1837.
- Flora de Filipinas. Según el sistema sexual de Linneo... Segunda impression &c., Manila: 1845.
- Flora de Filipinas, según el sistema sexual de Linneo. Adicionada con el manuscrito inédito del. fr. Ignacio Mercado, las obras del fr. Antonio Llanos, y de un apéndice con todas las nuevas investigaciones botanicas referentes al archipiélago Filifino [sic]. Gran edicion., Manila: 1877-1883

== Bibliography ==
- Biography at Royal Academy of the History of Spain
- Biography at Nationaal Herbarium Nederland
- Plates from Flora de Filipinas at Wikimedia Commons.
- Blanco, Francisco Manuel (1877). "Biografía del R. P. Fr. Manuel Blanco". Flora de Filipinas; Gran edición; Tomo Primero (3 ed.). Manila (Filipinas). pp. XIII–XXIX.
- Robinson, C. B. (1906). "The History of Botany in the Philippine Islands". Journal of the New York Botanical Garden. 7 (76): 104–112.
