= Irati (river) =

River in Spain

Iratiko erreka
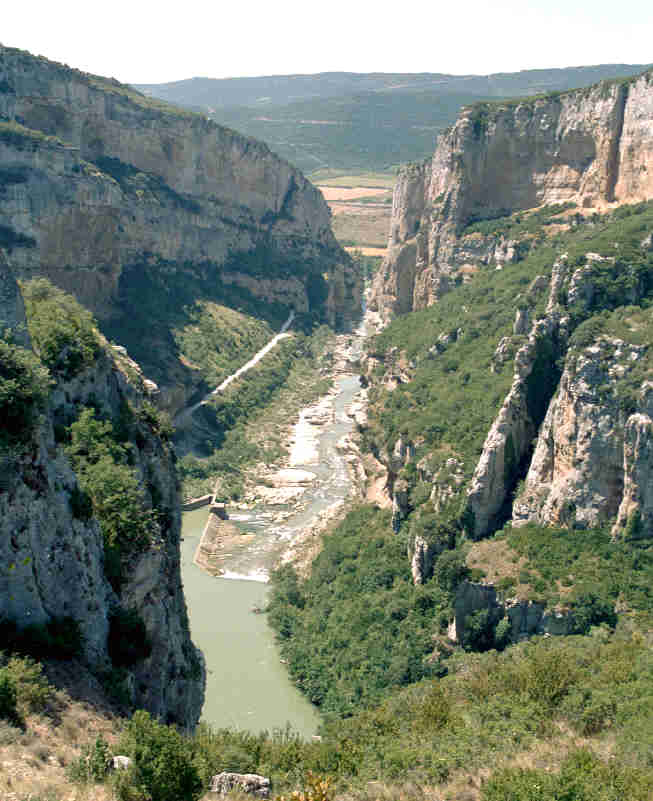
- The gorges of Foz de Lumbier

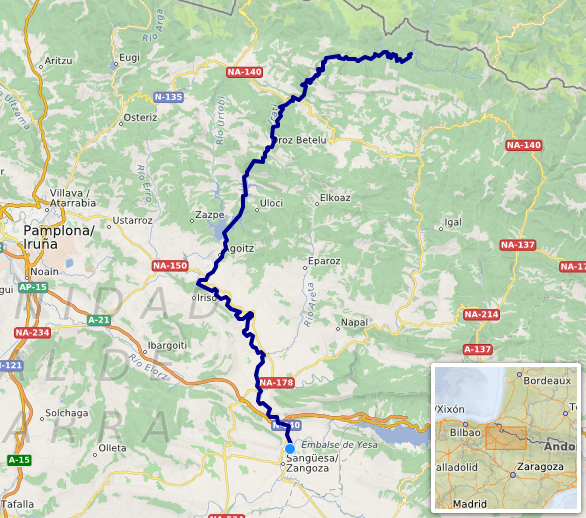
- Course of the Irati in the Ebro basin

Location
- Country: Spain
- Region: Sangüesa, Navarre

Physical characteristics
- Source
  - location: confluence Urtxuria and Urbeltza, Irati Forest
  - coordinates: 42°58′16″N 1°2′53″W
- Mouth: Aragón
  - location: north of Sangüesa
  - coordinates: 42°35′26″N 1°16′24″W
  - elevation: 400 m (1,300 ft)
- Length: 83.8 km (52.1 mi)
- Basin size: 522.28 km^{2} (201.65 sq mi)
- Discharge
  - average: 34.377 m^{3}/s (1,214.0 cu ft/s)

Basin features
- Progression: Aragón→ Ebro→ Balearic Sea

The Irati river (Basque: Iratiko erreka) is a right bank tributary of the Aragon in Sangüesa, Navarre. It begins in the Irati Forest, then feeds the water retenue of 'Itoiz.

== Path ==
It begins at the meeting point of the Urbeltza and Urtxuria rivers (black waters and white waters in Basque, respectively) in the Irati Forest. From north, it has one French tributary, l'Iratiko. The river is then held up, shortly before Irabia, by a pond in the heart of the forest, Lake Irabia, built in 1921 with a tributary from the north, the river Urrio.

After having fared through Aezkoa and Oroz-Betelu, offering stunning landscapes, the Irati is held up again in the marais d'Itoiz, already joined by the Urrobi and the Erro. It is then joined by the Areta and the Salazar to immediately enter the gorges of la Foz de Lumbier.

Finally, its path ends after 88 kilometres (55 mi) in the Aragon.

== Convenience ==
The wealth and conservation of its waters, with its bank vegetation and fish population makes it an important recreational fishing spot, albeit that it is declared as an area of common interest by the European regimentation.

It is probably the most used river for hydro-electrical purposes, namely after the inauguration of Irati S.A enterprise (1911), which also gave its name to the electrical train from Pamplona to Sangüesa. The Irabia dam was built at this time, enlarged more than five times to guaranty the river flow for the transportation of wood to the Ekai sawmill.

Along the river, one can still find a lot of tubes, buckets, pipes, canals and plants which reflect the quality of these constructions.
