= Marquiz de Alba =

Coordinates: 41°42′29″N 5°58′25″W

Marquiz de Alba, Spain
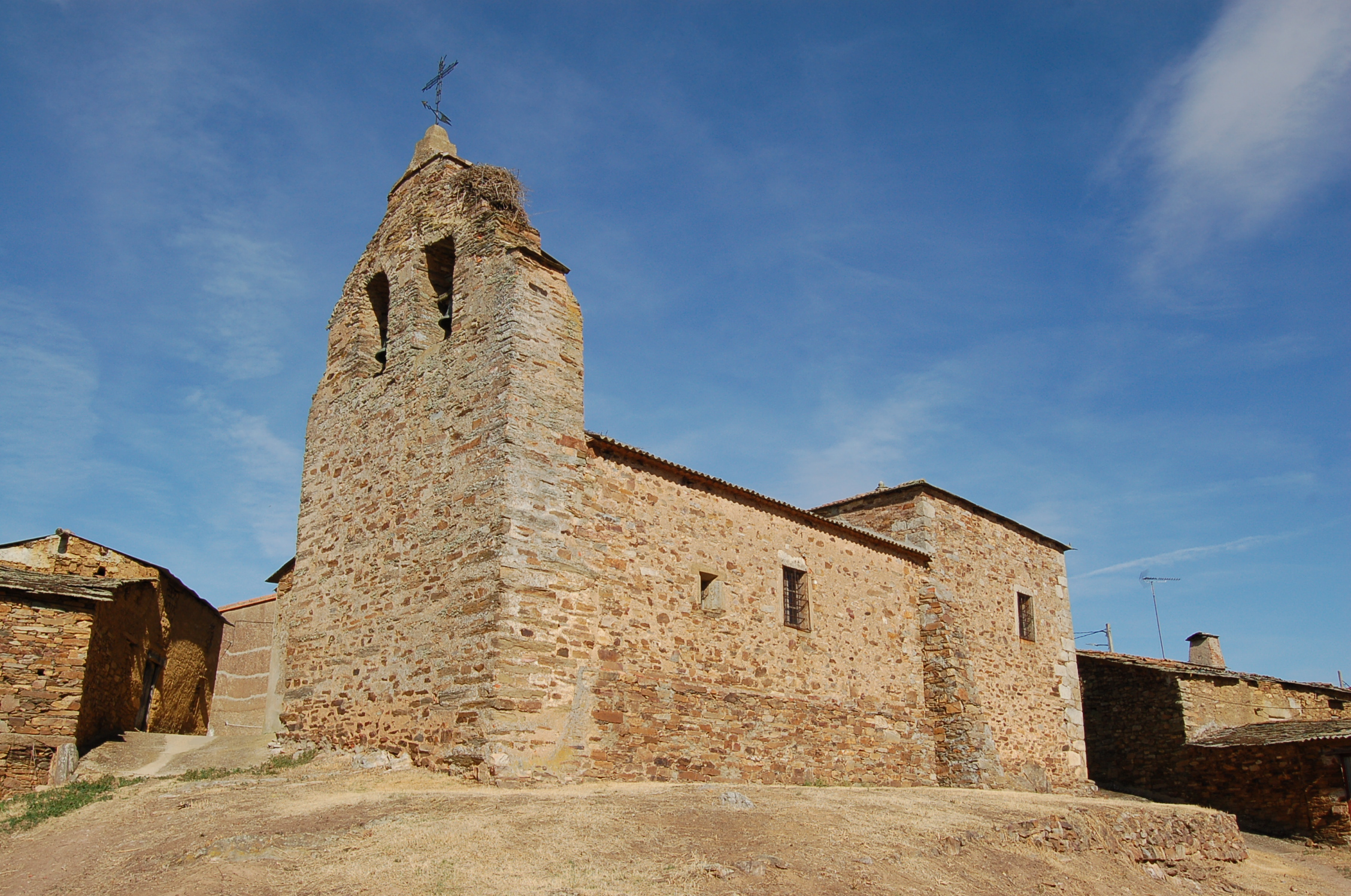
- Interactive map of Marquiz de Alba, Spain
- Country: Spain
- Autonomous community: Castile and León
- Province: Zamora
- Comarca: Tierra de Alba
- Mancomunidad: Tierra de Tábara
- Town hall: Olmillos de Castro

Population (2020)
  - Total: 59
- Time zone: UTC+1 (CET)
  - Summer (DST): UTC+2 (CEST)

Marquiz de Alba is a village located in the province of Zamora, Castile and León, Spain. According to the 2020 census (INE), the village had a population of 59 inhabitants.

== Town hall ==
Olmillos de Castro is home to the town hall of 4 villages:

- San Martín de Tábara (72 inhabitants, INE 2020).
- Olmillos de Castro (63 inhabitants, INE 2020).
- Marquiz de Alba (59 inhabitants, INE 2020).
- Navianos de Alba (18 inhabitants, INE 2020).
