= Hiriberri/Villanueva de Aezkoa =

Municipality of Spain

Coordinates: 42.95°N 1.233333°W

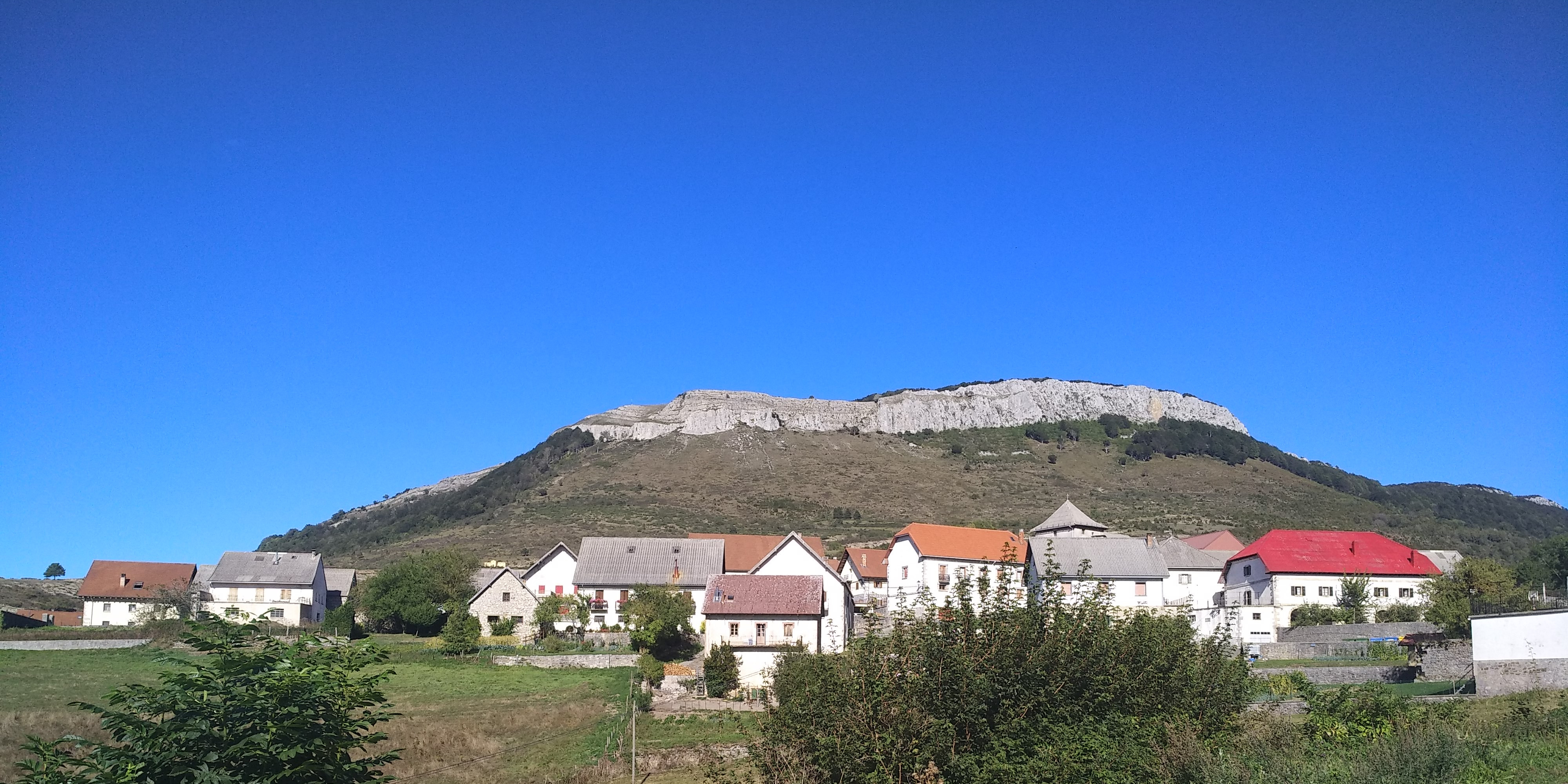
View of Villanueva de Aezkoa

Hiriberri/Villanueva de Aezkoa is a town and municipality located in the north of Navarre. It belongs to the Valley of Aezkoa, together with several villages.
