= Okabe (mountain) =

Mountain in the Pyrenees in France

Mount Okabe
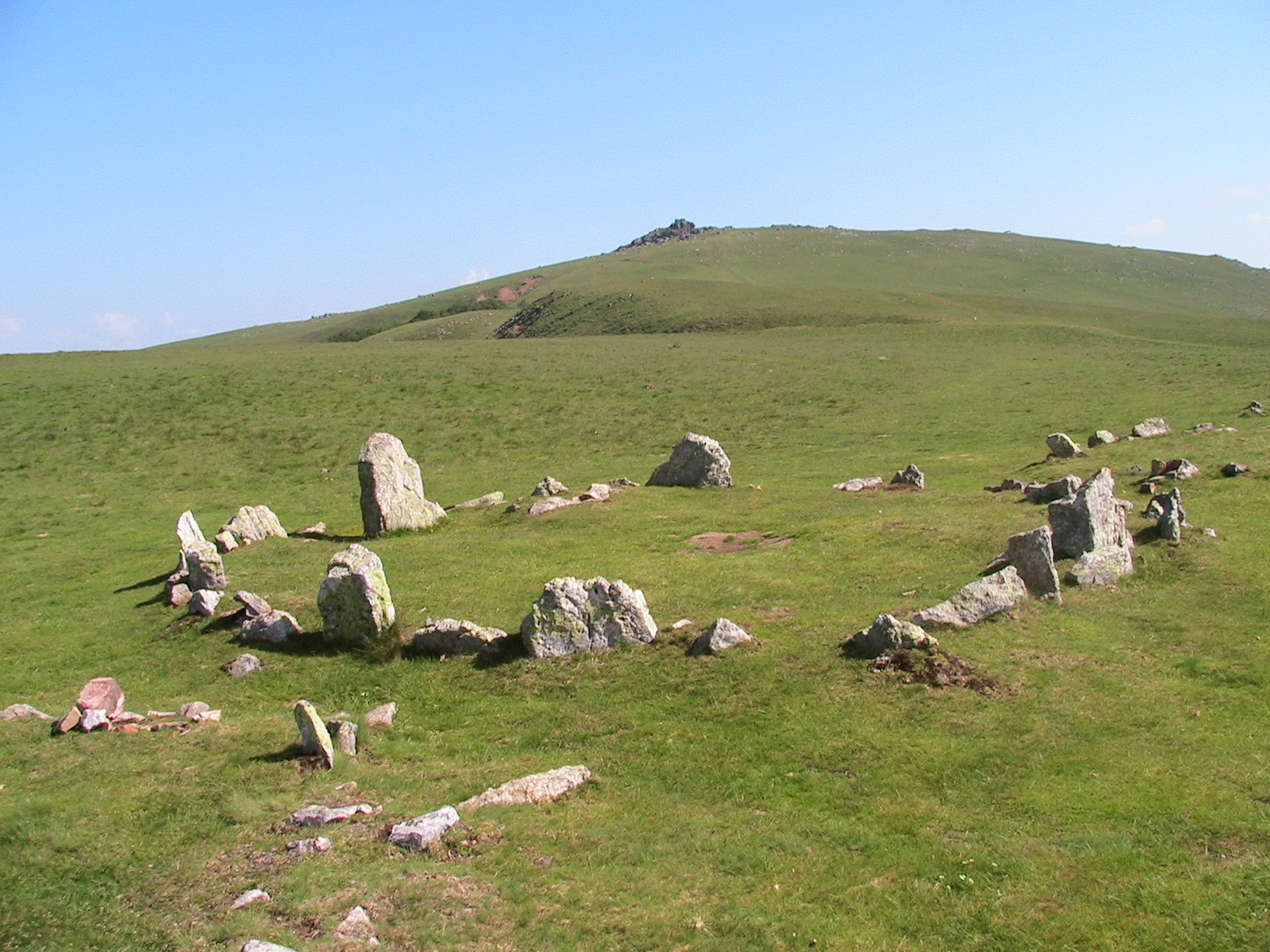
- Harrespil and summit

Highest point
- Elevation: 1,456 m (4,777 ft)
- Coordinates: 43°02′04″N 01°06′25″W

Geography
- Location within Pyrenees
- Location: Aquitaine, France
- Département: Pyrénées-Atlantiques
- Commune: Estérençuby
- Parent range: Pyrenees

Okabe or Occabe, is a 1,456 m (4,777 ft) high Pyrenean summit in the Lower Navarre province of the northern Basque Country in France.

== Name ==
Okʰabe is a hydronym from a spring located on the southern slope.

== Topography ==
Mount Okabe lies on the pyrenean watershed. Cromlechs called harrespils lie on the western slope of the massif.

26 cromlechs or harrespils have been found on the Okabe plateau. Perhaps the area of an ancient pastoral passage, no written record provides any explanation for the presence of these prehistorical or protohistoric relics. Researchers have found pavings and remains of charcoal and ash in the middle of the rings. Corps cremation and funerary rituels suggest it was a necropole.

== Access ==
Possible from Estérençuby or the Irati Forest. From Saint-Jean-Pied-de-Port, take the col d'Iraty road, go past la chapelle Saint-Sauveur, go up to the summit of the col de Burdincurutcheta, go down to the plateau d'Iraty and take the D301 road to the col de Sourzay summit. Stop at the house (the only one in 2011). Mount Okabe lies south-east; then about an hour's walk.

== Gallery ==
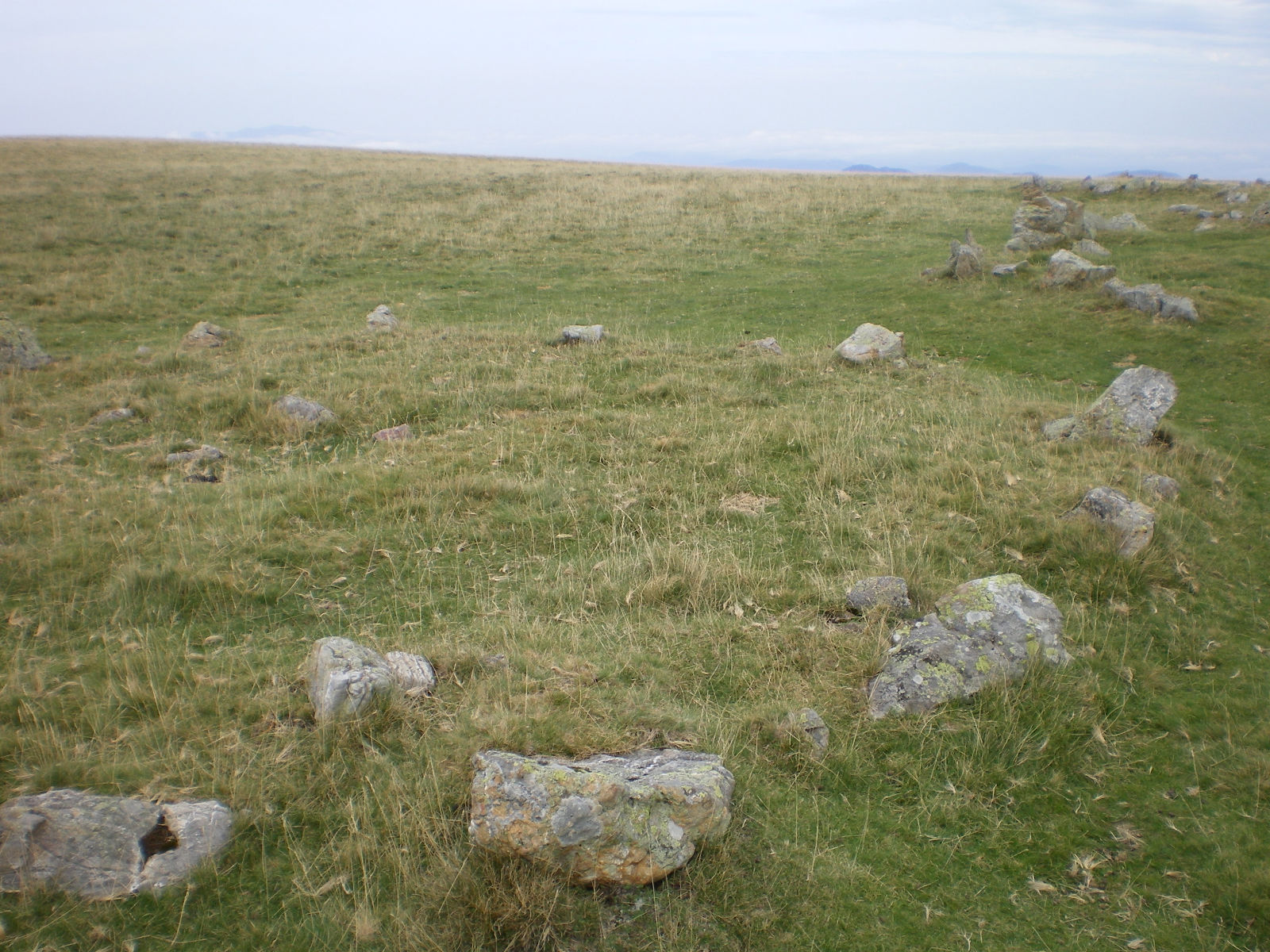

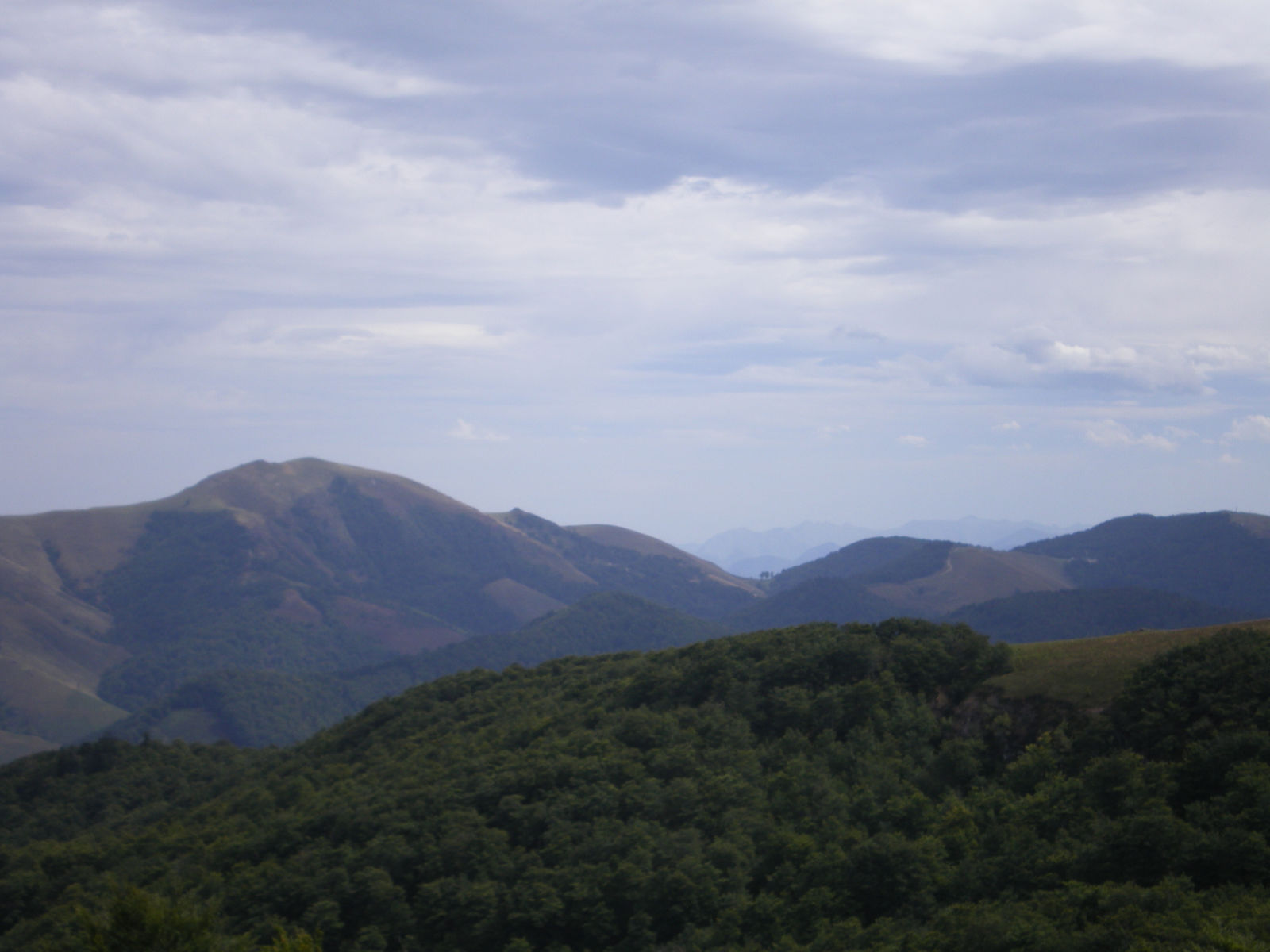

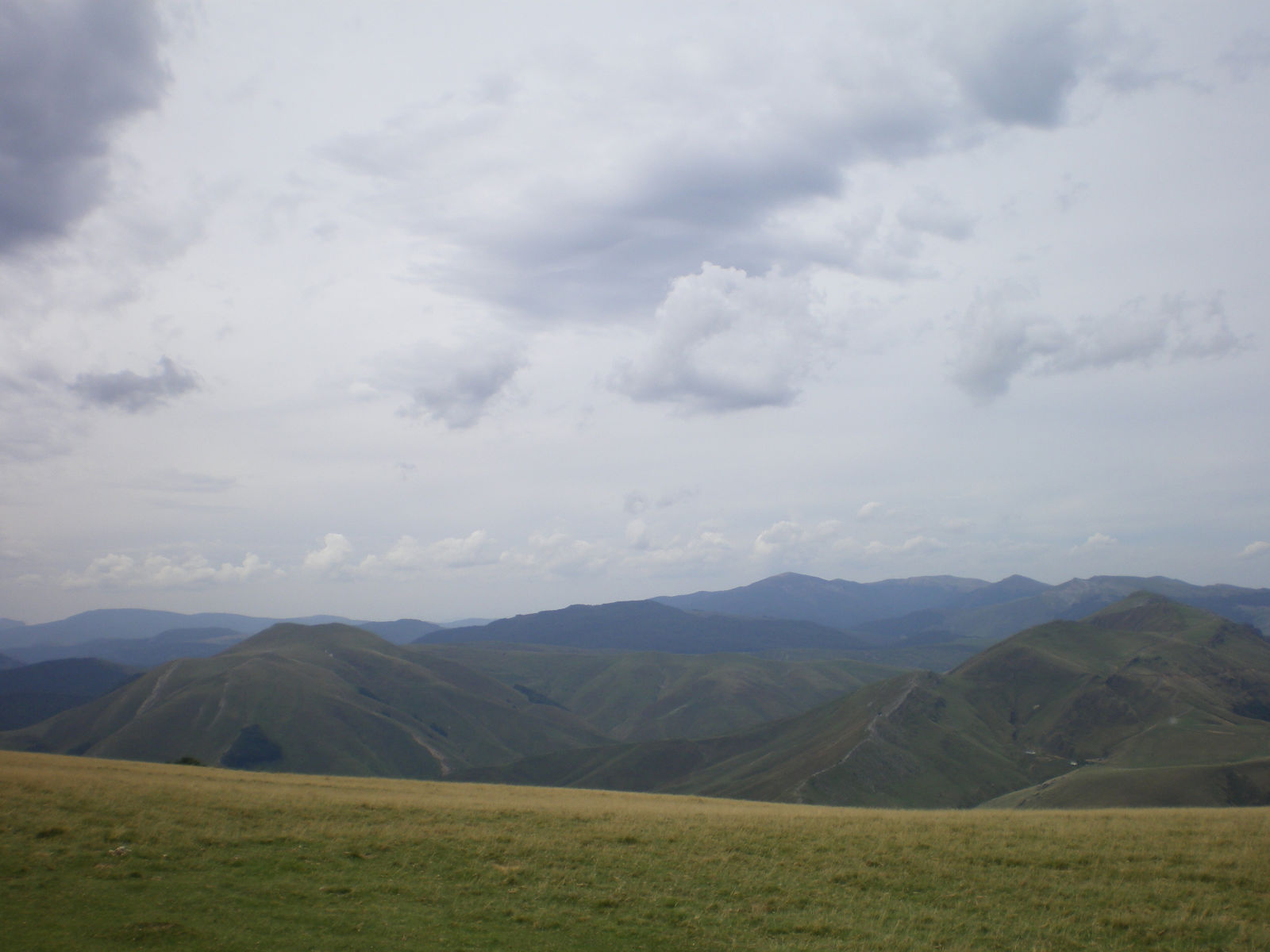

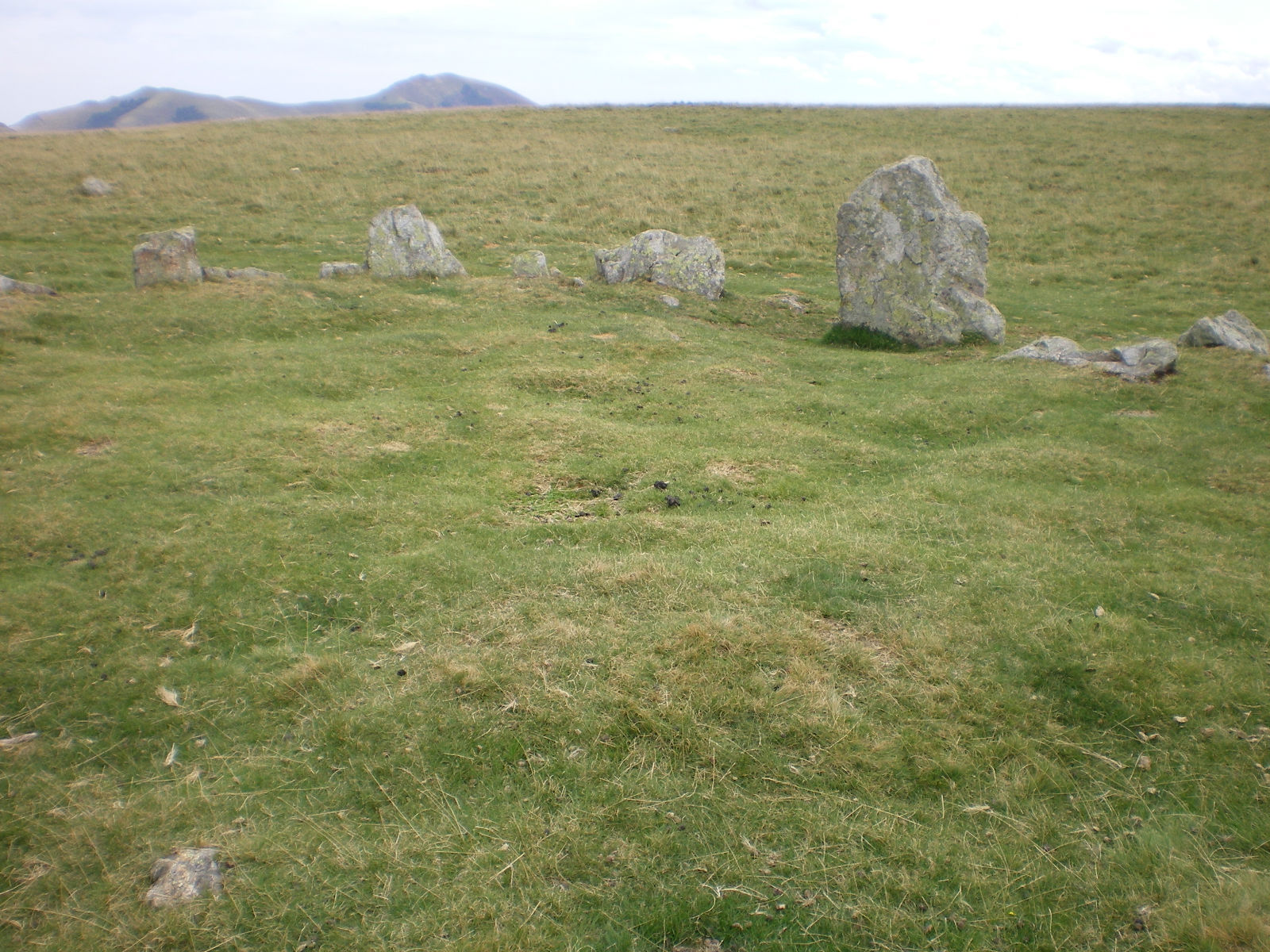

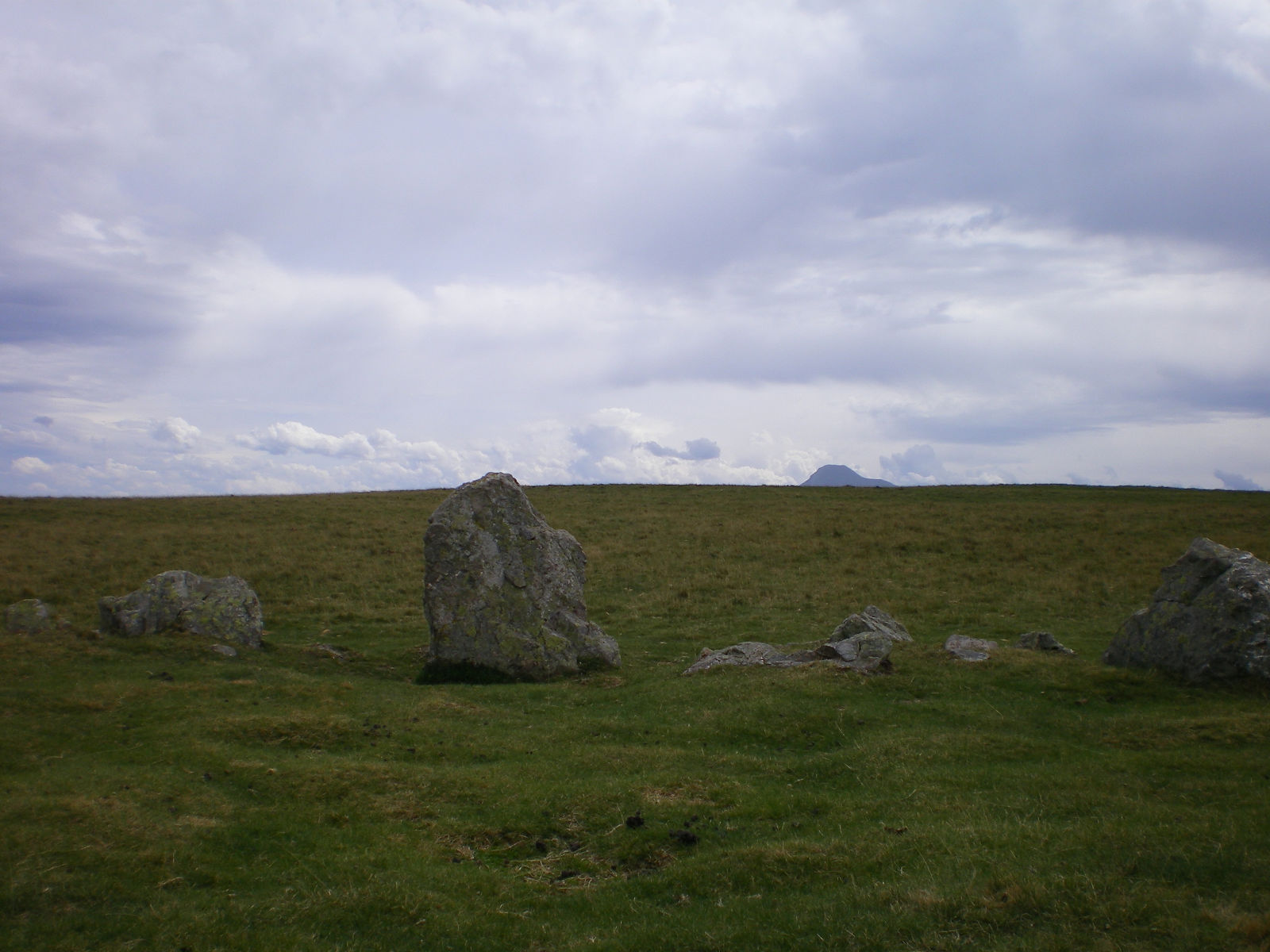

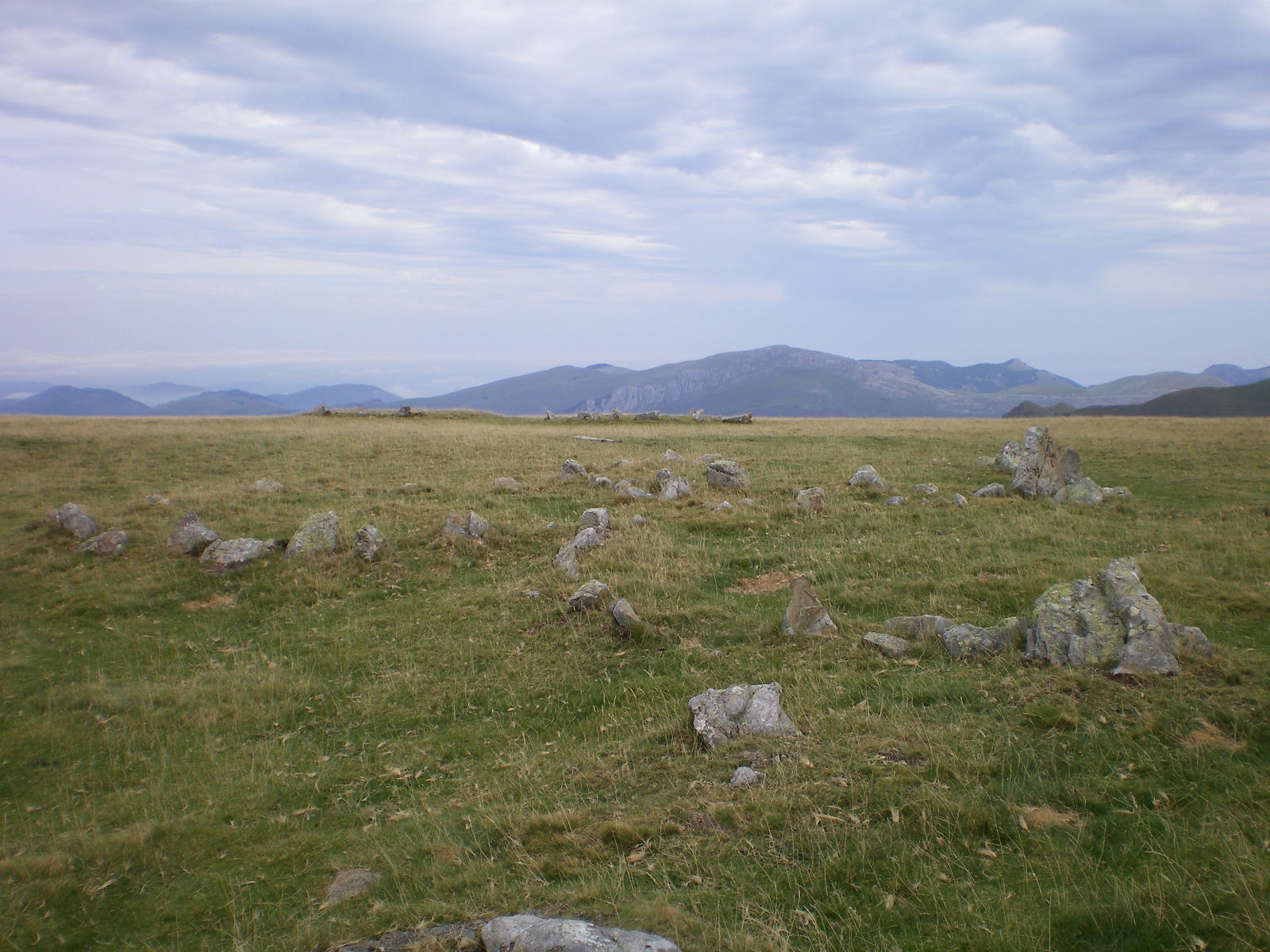
