= Salazar Valley =

Coordinates: 42°50′N 01°06′W

Salazar Valley Zaraitzu
- Eskualdea / Comarca
- Coat of arms

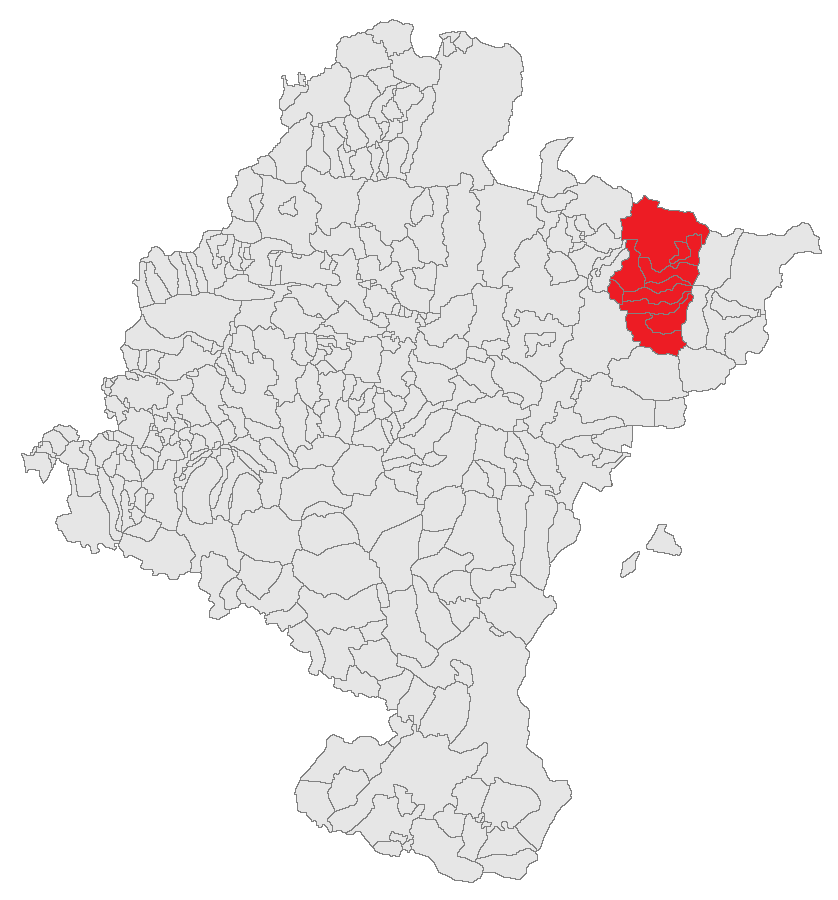
- Country: Spain
- Autonomous community: Navarre
- Capital: Ezcároz – Ezkaroze
- Municipalities: List: See text

Area
  - Total: 310 km^{2} (120 sq mi)

Population (2007)
  - Total: 1,620
  - Density: 5.2/km^{2} (14/sq mi)
- Time zone: UTC+1 (CET)
  - Summer (DST): UTC+2 (CEST)

The Salazar Valley (Basque: Zaraitzu Ibarra, Spanish: Valle de Salazar) is a valley in the east of the Foral Community of Navarre in Spain. It lies within the Merindad of Zangoza-Sangüesa and within that, the Comarca of Roncal-Salazar. The Sierra de Abodi, part of the Western Pyrenees, forms the natural boundary in the north. There is a ski resort in Abodi.

== Etymology ==
The first mention of the name was in documents of the Monastery of Leire, with the denomination of Sarasazo (924). Later Sarasazu (1055), Sarasaz (1111 and 1469), Sarasaitz (1205) especially in texts written in Latin.

Zaraitzu seems to derivate from an older form: Sarasaitzu.

The Castilian official denomination began being used widely in the 17th century probably influenced by the Salazar surname, famous in the Nobility of the Iberian Peninsula. In fact Salazar is not a common surname in Navarre, but it is very common in the west of the Basque Country, which indicates its origins.

== Zaraitzu Basque ==
The local Basque language dialect was the Salazarese, although nowadays Spanish among the elder population and Spanish and Euskara Batua between younger generations is spoken. However, the last publications of works about the Basque of Zaraitzu (dictionary, learning method, text collection and oral recordings) and some courses of this dialect in the valley have been addressed to the local population in order to maintain it to some extent.

== Municipalities ==
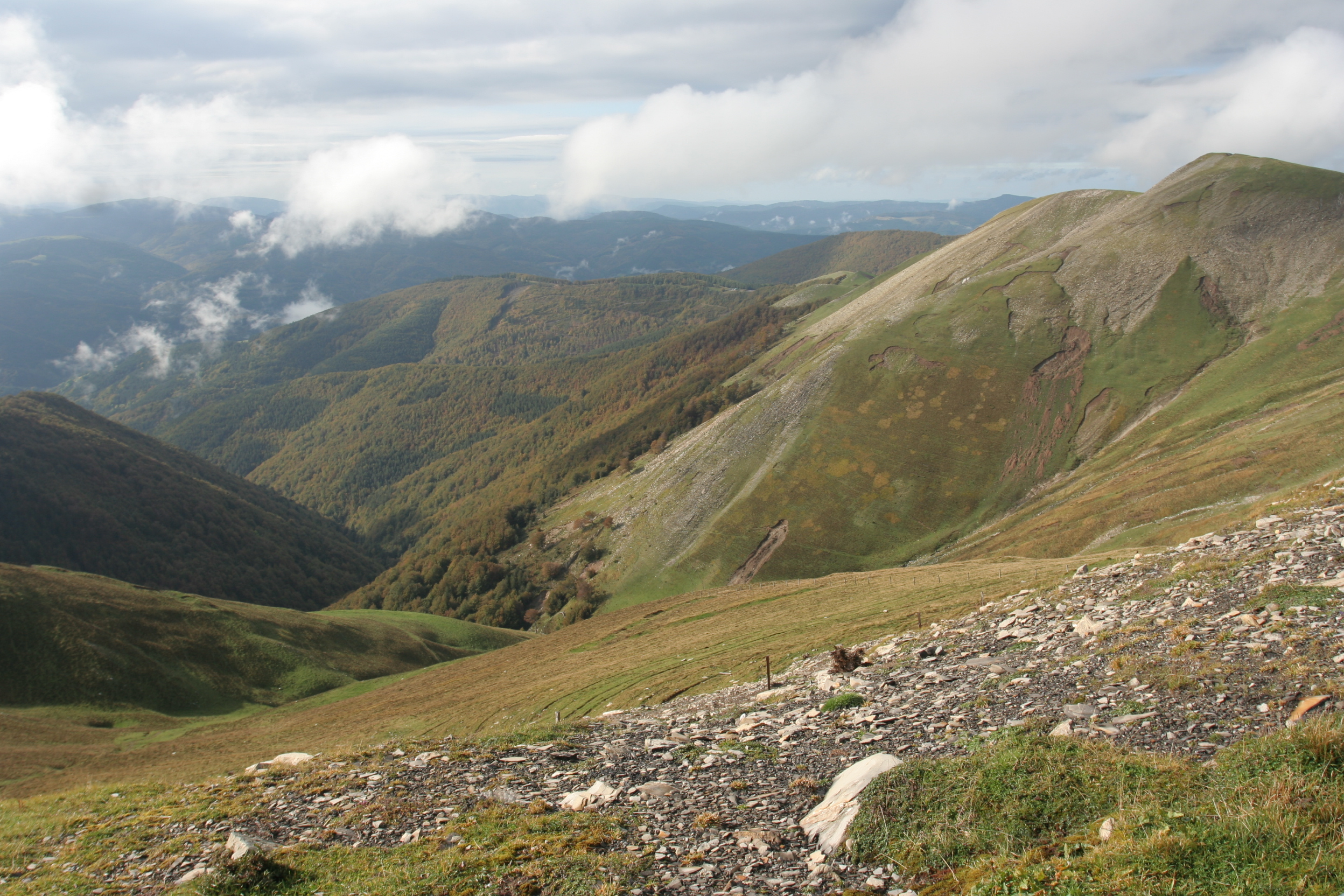
Valle de Salazar from above

The traditional names of the towns are in brackets.

- Uscarrés (Uskartze)
- Esparza de Salazar (Espartza Zaraitzu/Esparza)
- Ezcároz (Ezkaroze)
- Gallués (Galoze)
- Güesa (Gorza)
- Ibilcieta (Ibiltzieta/Ibizta)
- Iciz (Izize)
- Igal (Igari)
- Izal (Itzalle)
- Izalzu (Itzaltzu)
- Ochagavía (Otsagabia/Otsagi)
- Oronz (Orontze)
- Sarriés (Sartze)
- Jaurrieta (Eaurta)

== Demographics ==
Population development in Zaraitzu after 1975
Municipality	1975	1981	1986	1991	1996	2001	2005
Espartza Zaraitzu-Esparza de Salazar	199	160	159	136	122	103	100
Ezkaroze-Ezcároz	466	431	400	365	364	358	363
Galoze-Gallués	149	135	142	133	124	121	118
Gorza-Güesa	122	113	106	90	79	72	65
Itzaltzu-Izalzu	84	54	52	49	49	45	46
Jaurrieta	415	391	359	321	268	238	225
Otsagabia-Ochagavía	826	777	721	676	701	666	651
Orontze-Oronz	66	70	70	57	53	56	55
Sartze-Sarriés	121	112	106	111	84	79	81
Total	2448	2243	2115	1938	1844	1738	1704
