= Aria, Navarre =

Municipality located in Navarre, Spain

Coordinates: 42°57′N 1°16′W

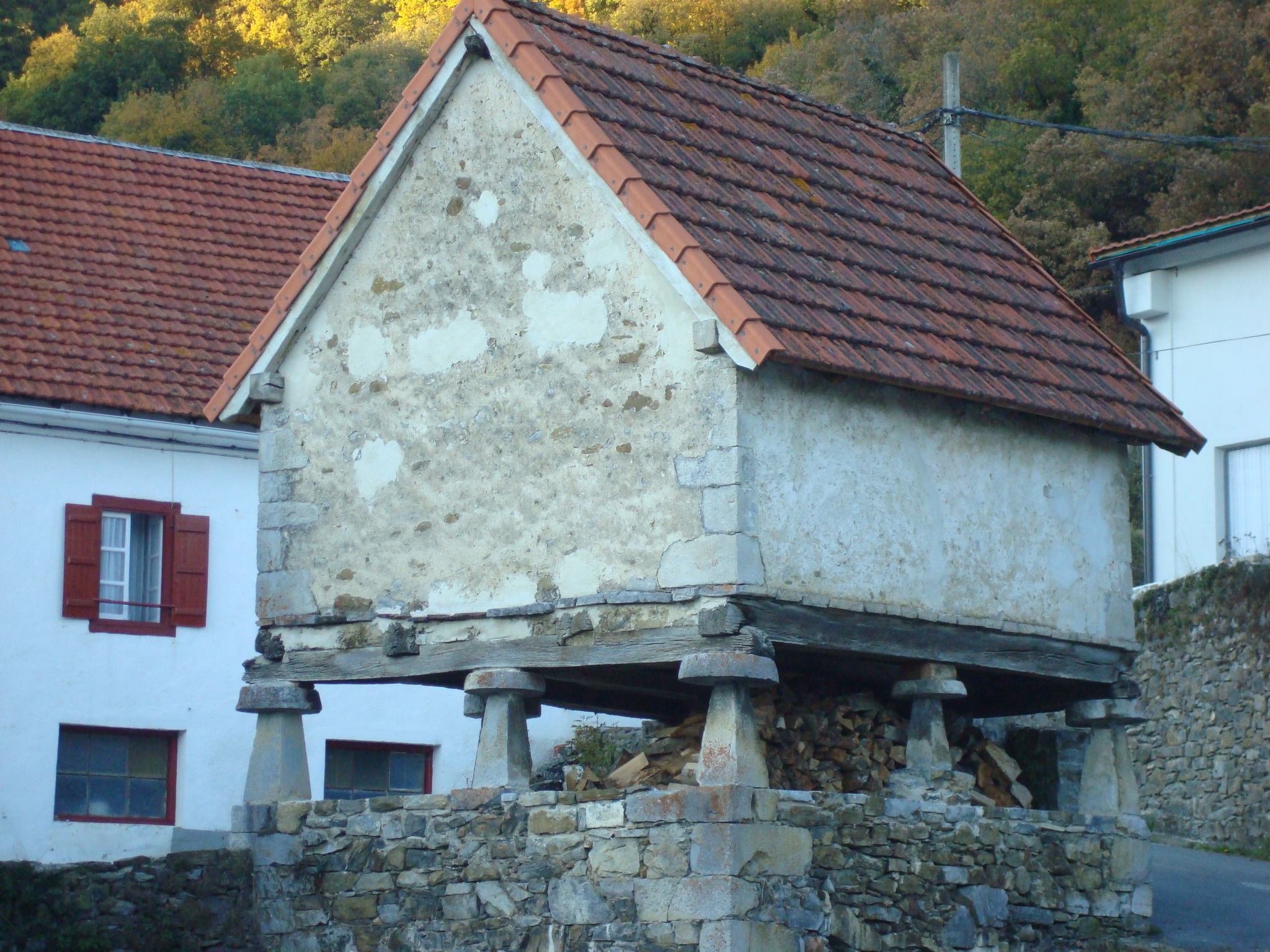

Aria's flag

Aria's coat of arms

Aria is a village and municipality located in the province and autonomous community of Navarre, northern Spain.
