= Güesa – Gorza =

Municipality in Navarre, Spain

Güesa / Gorza: Güesa (Spanish); Gorza (Basque)
- Town and municipality
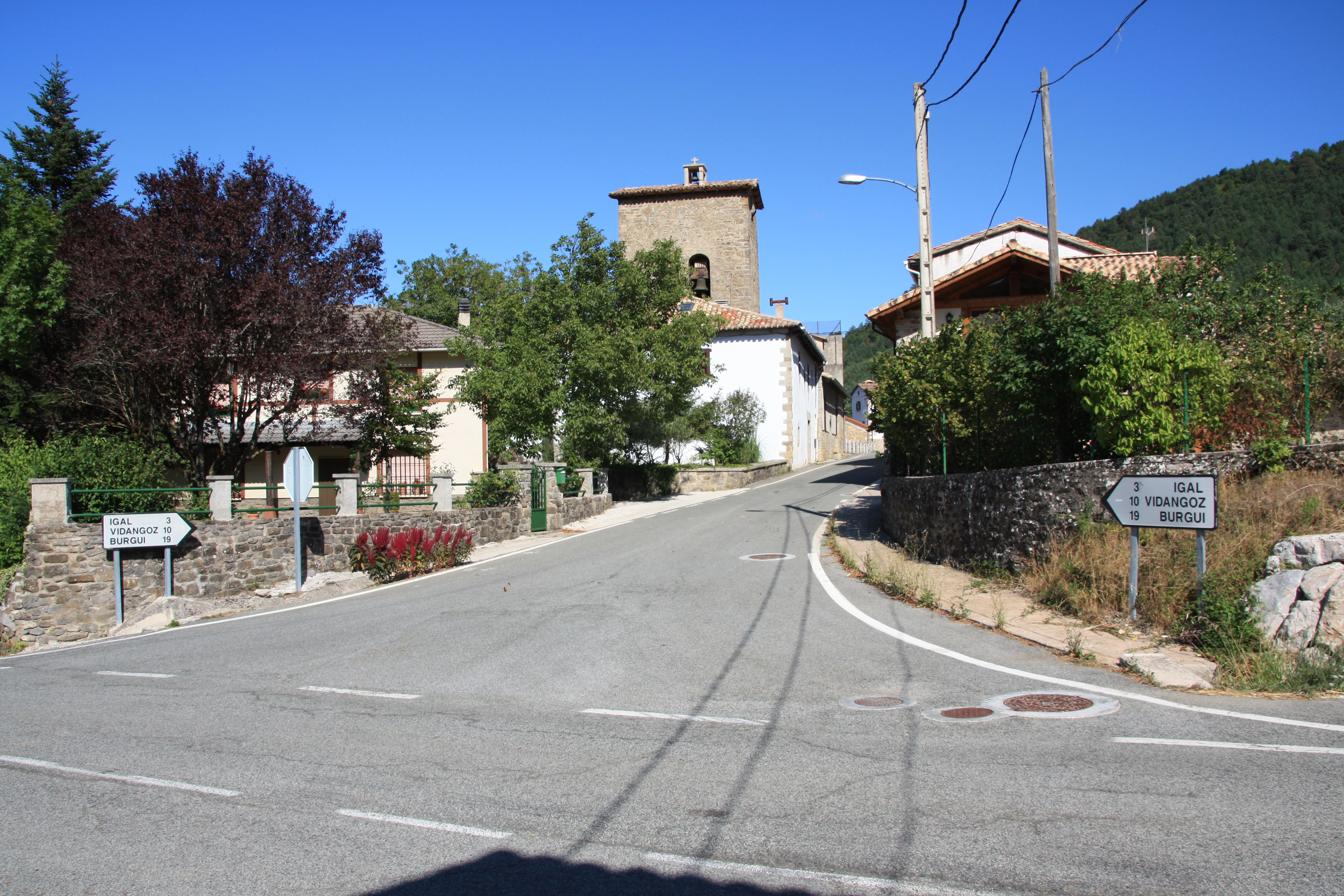
- Interactive map of Güesa / Gorza
- Country: Spain
- Autonomous Community: Navarre

Population (2025)
  - Total: 38

Güesa – Gorza is a town and municipality located in the province and autonomous community of Navarre, Spain.
