= Aribe =

Town in Navarre, Spain

Coordinates: 43.0364°N 1.985°W

Aribe's flag

Aribe's coat of arms

Aribe is a town and municipality located in the province and autonomous community of Navarre, northern Spain.
