= Oronz – Orontze =

Spanish town

Coordinates: 42°52′N 1°06′W

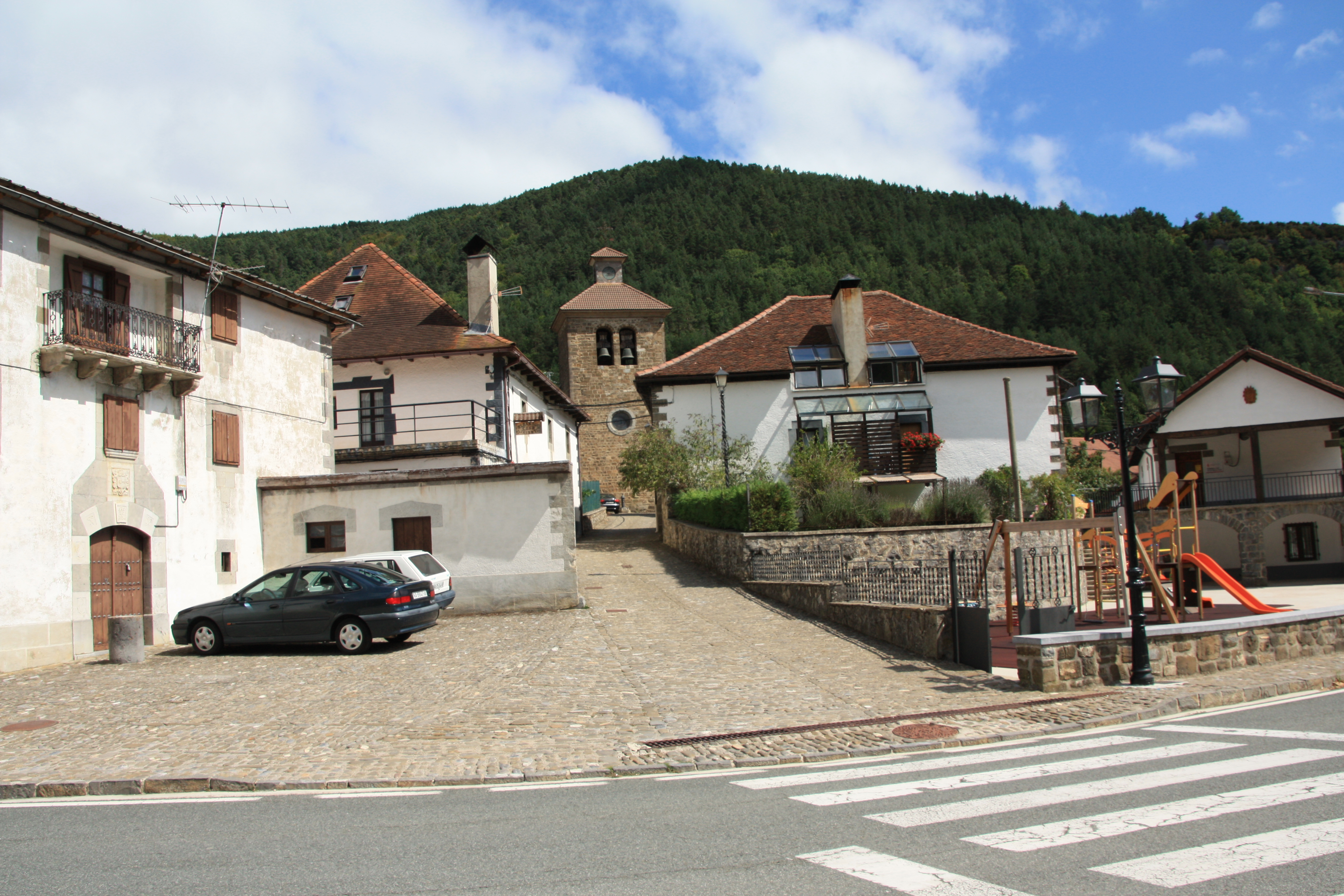
Orontze Town

Oronz, or Orontze is a town and municipality located in the province and autonomous community of Navarre, northern Spain.
