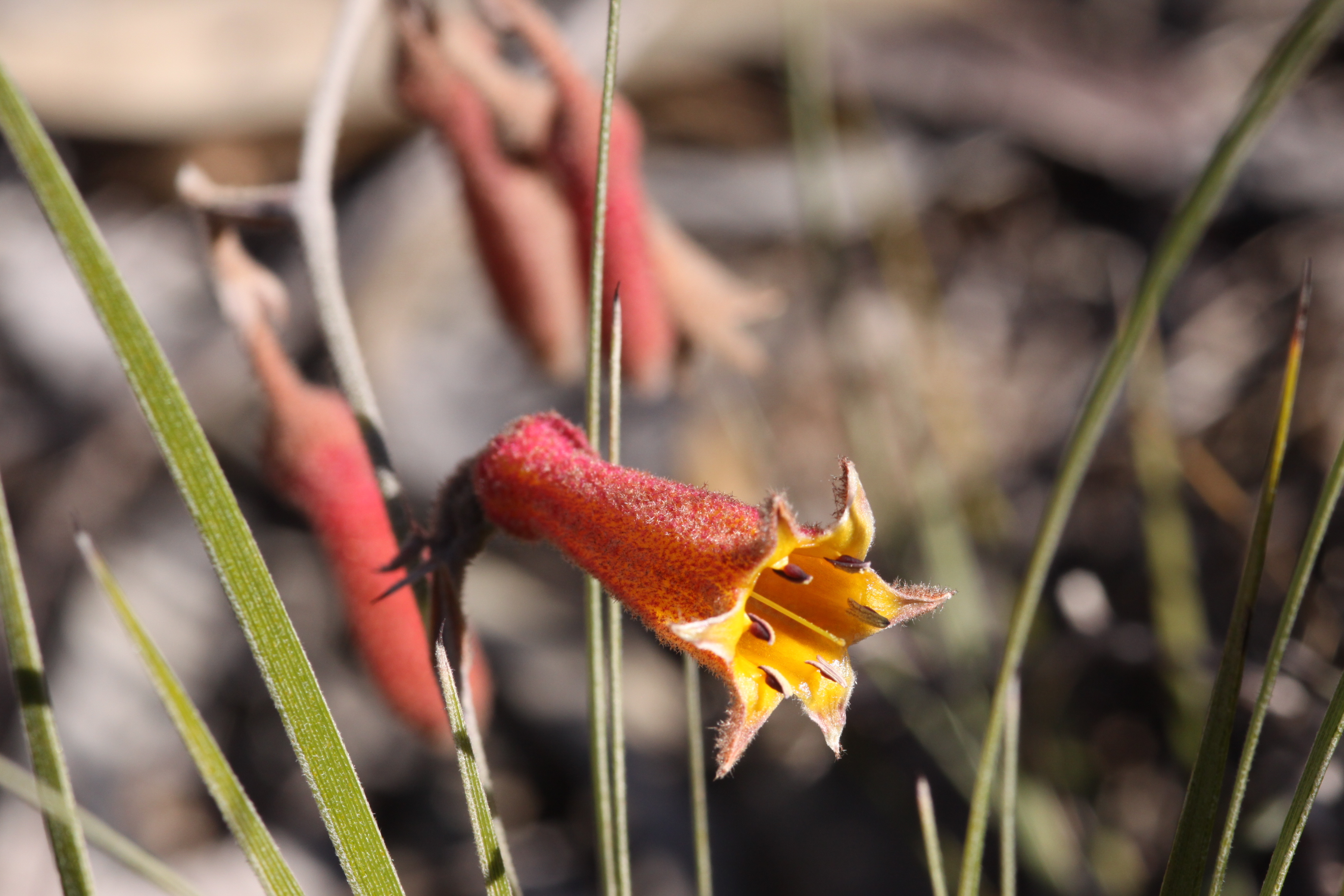
- Flower at Lesueur National Park, Western Australia

Scientific classification
- Kingdom: Plantae
- Clade: Tracheophytes
- Clade: Angiosperms
- Clade: Monocots
- Clade: Commelinids
- Order: Commelinales
- Family: Haemodoraceae
- Subfamily: Conostylidoideae
- Genus: Blancoa; Lindl.
- Species: B. canescens

Binomial name
- Blancoa canescens Lindl.
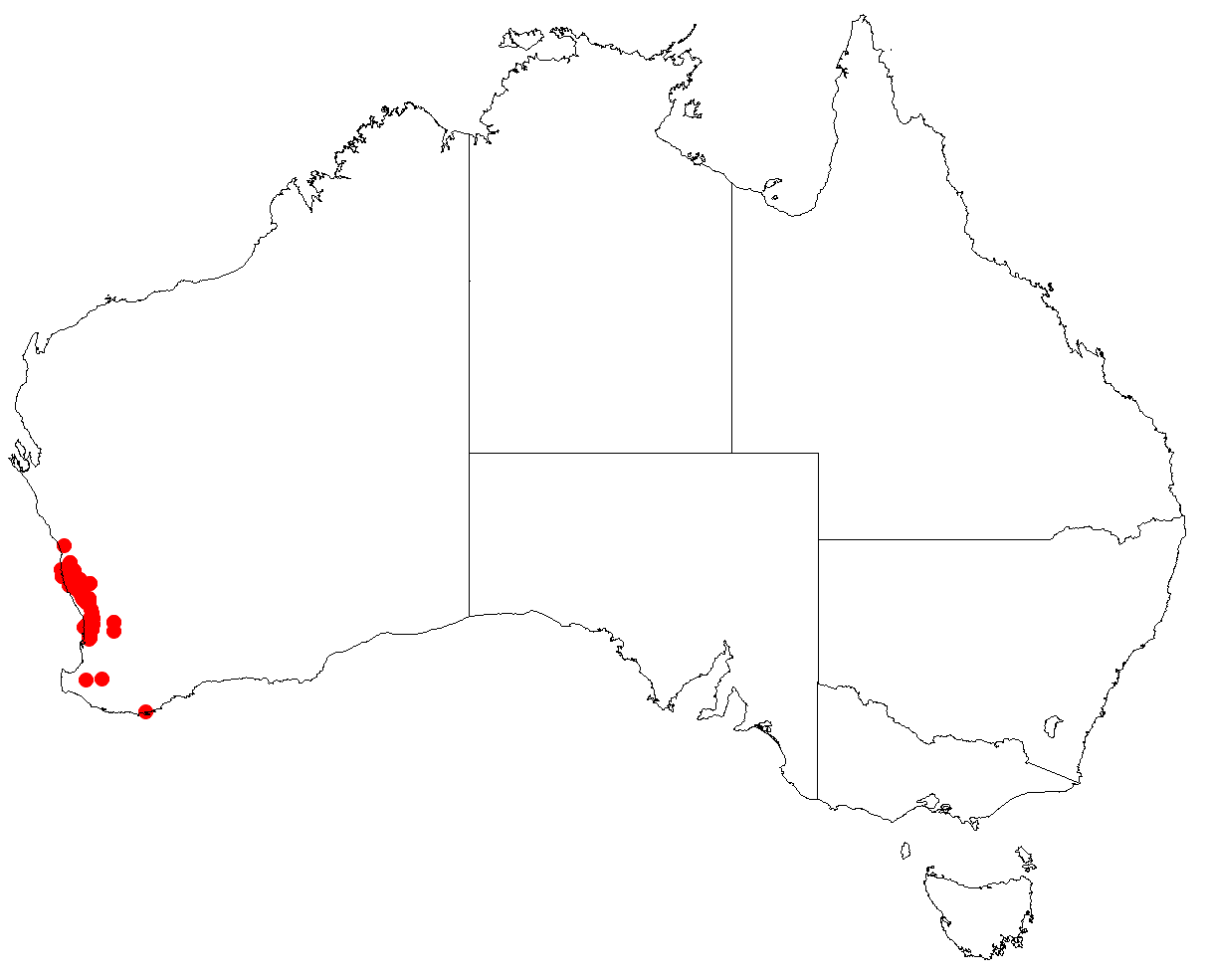
- Collection data from Australasian Virtual Herbarium of Blancoa canescens

Synonyms
- Conostylis canescens (Lindl.) F.Muell.

= Blancoa =

Genus of flowering plants

Blancoa is a monotypic genus of perennial herbs in the family Haemodoraceae; the single species is Blancoa canescens, commonly known as the winter bell. It is endemic to the southwestern corner of Western Australia. It has nodding red to pink flowers, a clumping habit and grows to be 10 to 40 cm in height. The genus is named in honour of Francisco Manuel Blanco, a Spanish friar and botanist who compiled the first comprehensive flora of the Philippines.

== Description ==
The winter bell is a clump-forming perennial herb with a rhizomatous rootstock. It sprouts tufts of linear leaves 25 cm (10 in) long by 0.5 cm (0.2 in) wide with entire margins and prominent parallel veins, which are covered with silky hairs when young. The pink or red, nodding flowers are about 3 cm (1.2 in) long, with yellowish interiors, and grow in pairs in a few-flowered spike. The plant flowers between May and September, in the wet season. The outside of the tubular flowers are covered with fine rusty-red hairs while the inside is hairless. There is a nectary at the base of the tube which provides copious nectar, and the flowers are pollinated by birds. The main pollinators are the singing honeyeater (Gavicalis virescens) and the red wattlebird (Anthochaera carunculata), although other birds and bees may also visit; larger birds stand on the ground, reaching up into the flowers to sip nectar while smaller birds may hang on the pedicel, their heads and beaks being showered with pollen. After pollination, the flowers fade and wither but remain in place while the fruits develop inside.

== Distribution and habitat ==
The winter bell is endemic to the coastal strip of southwestern Western Australia, where it is found in the Shire of Irwin, the Shire of Gingin and adjoining areas in the Southwest botanical province. It grows in deep sand in Banksia woodland and in kwongan, an open community of scrubby heathland. This region has a Mediterranean-type climate with cool wet winters and hot dry summers.
