= Itzalle =

Coordinates: 42.8050°N 1.1278°W

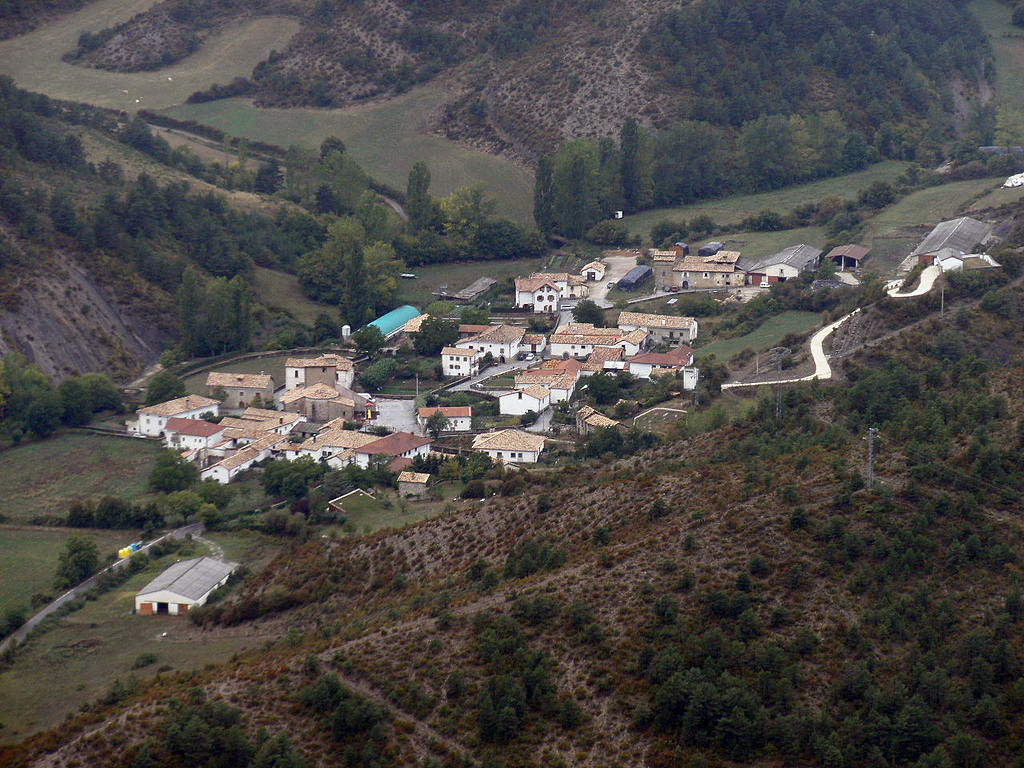

Itzalle or Izal (Basque: Itzalle, Spanish: Izal) is one of the villages that forms the municipality of Galoze in Zaraitzu, Navarre. The village contained 37 inhabitants in 2005.
