= List of municipalities in Soule =

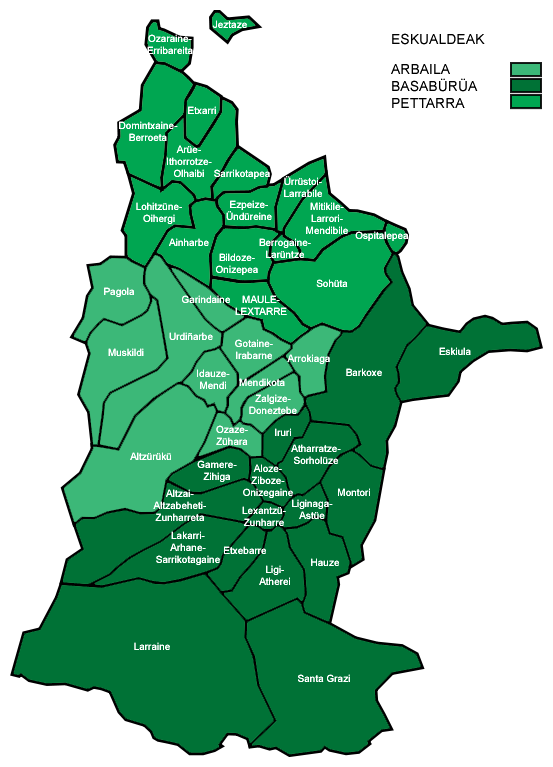
Map of Soule

This is a list of the municipalities in the province of Soule, which is located in Basque Country and part of Pyrénées-Atlantiques département.

Soule is the smallest historical province of the Basque Country. It is divided into 3 parts:

- Cantons of the arrondissement (district) of Oloron-Sainte-Marie (Mauleon-Licharre and Tardets-Soraluce)
- A part of the canton of Saint Palais (arrondissement of Bayonne)
- 7 municipalities of the canton de Saint-Palais (and a part of the municipality of Pagolle).

Official name in French	Basque name
Ainharp	Ainharbe
Alçay-Alçabéhéty-Sunharette	Altzai-Altzabeheti-Zunharreta
Alos-Sibas-Abense	Aloze-Ziboze-Onizegaine
Aroue-Ithorots-Olhaïby	Arüe-Ithorrotze-Olhaibi
Arrast-Larrebieu	Ürrustoi-Larrebille
Aussurucq	Altzürukü
Barcus	Barkoxe
Berrogain-Laruns	Berrogaine-Lahüntze
Camou-Cihigue	Gamere-Zihiga
Charritte-de-Bas	Sarrikotape
Chéraute	Sohüta
Domezain-Berraute	Domintxaine-Berroeta
Espès-Undurein	Espeize-Ündüreine
Esquiule	Eskiula
Etcharry	Etxarri
Etchebar	Etxebarre
Garindein	Garindaine
Gestas	Jestaze
Gotein-Libarrenx	Gotaine-Irabarne
Haux	Hauze
Idaux-Mendy	Idauze-Mendi
Lacarry-Arhan-Charritte-de-Haut	Lakarri-Arhane-Sarrikotagaine
Laguinge-Restoue	Liginaga-Astüe
Larrau	Larraine
L'Hôpital-Saint-Blaise	Ospitalepea
Lichans-Sunhar	Lexantzü-Zünharre
Licq-Athérey	Ligi-Atherei
Lohitzun-Oyhercq	Lohitzüne-Oihergi
Mauléon-Licharre	Maule-Lextarre
Menditte	Mendikota
Moncayolle-Larrory-Mendibieu	Mitikile-Larrori-Mendibile
Montory	Montori
Musculdy	Muskildi
Ordiarp	Urdiñarbe
Ossas-Suhare	Ozaze-Zühara
Osserain-Rivareyte	Ozaraine-Erribareita
Pagolle	Pagola
Roquiague	Arrokiaga
Sainte-Engrâce	Urdatx-Santa-Grazi
Sauguis-Saint-Étienne	Zalgize-Doneztebe
Tardets-Sorholus	Atharratze-Sorholüze
Trois-Villes	Iruri
Viodos-Abense-de-Bas	Bildoze-Onizepea
