= Ahaxe-Alciette-Bascassan =

Ahaxe-Alciette-Bascassan Ahatsa-Alzieta-Baskazane
- Commune
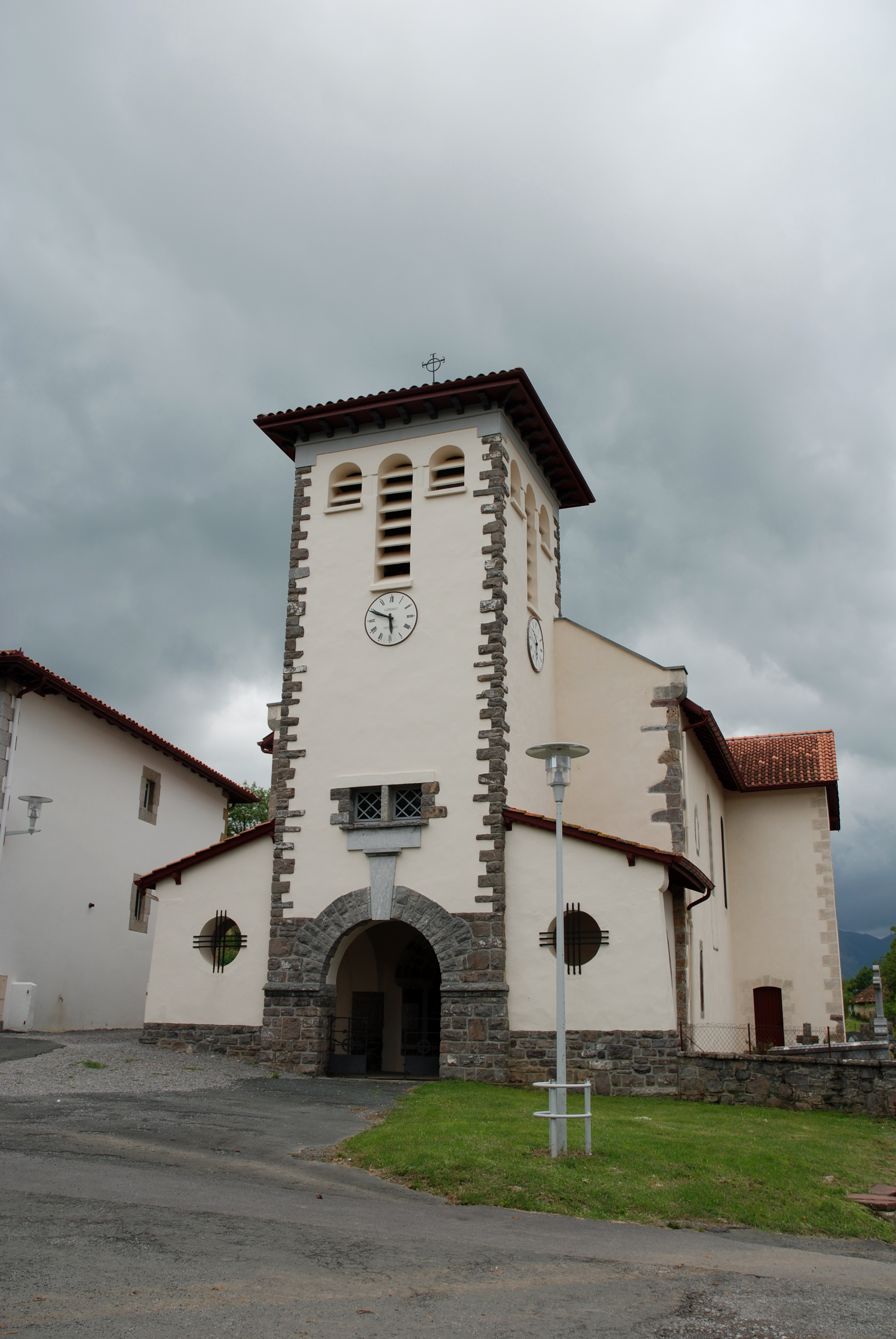
- The church of Ahaxe

- Coat of arms
- Location of Ahaxe-Alciette-Bascassan
- Location within France Location within Nouvelle-Aquitaine
- Coordinates: 43°09′04″N 1°09′50″W
- Country: France
- Region: Nouvelle-Aquitaine
- Department: Pyrénées-Atlantiques
- Arrondissement: Bayonne
- Canton: Montagne Basque
- Intercommunality: Pays Basque

Government
  - Mayor (2020–2026): Jean-Paul Bidart
- Area^{1}: 14.64 km^{2} (5.65 sq mi)
- Elevation: 265 m (869 ft)
- Highest elevation: 788 m (2,585 ft)
- Lowest elevation: 207 m (679 ft)
- Population (2023): 261
  - Density: 17.8/km^{2} (46.2/sq mi)
- Time zone: UTC+01:00 (CET)
  - Summer (DST): UTC+02:00 (CEST)
- INSEE/Postal code: 64008 /64220
- ^{1} French Land Register data, which excludes lakes, ponds, glaciers > 1 km^{2} (0.386 sq mi or 247 acres) and river estuaries.

Ahaxe-Alciette-Bascassan (French pronunciation: [a.aks alsjɛt baskasɑ̃]; Basque: Ahatsa-Alzieta-Baskazane) is a commune in the Pyrénées-Atlantiques department in the Nouvelle-Aquitaine region in southwestern France.

The people of the commune are known as Ahastar.

== Geography ==
=== Location ===
Ahaxe-Alciette-Bascassan is part of Cize/Garazi country which was a historical province in Lower Navarre. It includes three former parishes, sometimes counted as four groups of houses in the Middle Ages and with five toponyms: Alciette, Ahaxe, Garatehegi, Ligeta, and Bascassan located at the confluence of the Laurhibar and Esteneko streams.

Alciette is the parish farthest away to the northeast in the combination of the three parishes.

Ahaxe-Alciette-Bascassan is located some 6 km south-east of Saint-Jean-Pied-de-Port and can be accessed by Highway D18 running from close to there through the heart of the commune southeast to Lecumberry. The village is not on the highway and is left onto the country road Vierge-d'Ahaxe off the D18 heading southeast. There is a country road from Aincille in the west to the village of Bascassin in the commune and there are other country roads entering from the north and the southeast.

=== Hydrography ===
The commune is located in the Drainage basin of the Adour, the commune lands are watered by the Laurhibar, a tributary of the Nive, and a tributary of that, the Esteneko stream. The Apatéko stream, a tributary of the Arzubiko stream also crosses the territory of Ahaxe-Alciette-Bascassan.

=== Localities and hamlets ===
- Aguerréa
- Ahatsaxilo (former parish)
- Ahaxamendy
- Ahaxe
- Alciette
- Bascassan
- Bastida
- Bernetcheko Borda
- Bidartéa
- Bordes (2 places)
- Buirguista
- Buluntza
- Chilinchabidéa
- Chilo
- Curutchet (or Garat)
- Dorrea
- Errékaldéa
- Erromatéguia (2 places)
- Etcheverria
- Garatehegi
- Garatéko Eyhéra
- Gastelua
- Gastalepo
- Haraune
- Harguindéguia
- Idioinea
- Irahane
- Iriberria
- Irigaraya
- Irustikoborda
- Italatzé
- Kapila
- Larluzia
- Libiéta
- Lietamendy
- Ligeta
- Olherry
- Orido
- Ospitaletchia
- Sagardoyguibel
- Seineguy
- Uhaïtzia
- Urrutia

== Toponymy ==
The commune's name in Basque is Ahatsa-Alzieta-Baskazane.

Ahaxe

The toponym Ahaxe appears in the forms:

- Hatce (1167)
- Fax (1194)
- domine de ahacha (1194)
- Assa, Aassa, and Hassa (1249)
- Ahatxa (1300)
- Ahaxa (1302 Chapter of Bayonne)
- Haxa and Ahaxe (1304)
- Axa (1309 and 1350)
- Hatxa (1350)
- Hadssa (1366)
- Ahtxe (1703), Visits of Bayonne
- Sanctus Julianus Ahaxe (1757, Diocese of Bayonne collections).

Jean-Baptiste Orpustan indicates that the toponym comes from the Basque oronymic base of (h)aitz meaning "rock" or "height".

The people of the commune are called in Basque Ahatsar.

Alciette

The toponym Alciette appears in the forms:

- Alsuete (1249)
- La Grange Alsuete (1302, Chapter of Bayonne)
- Alçueta (1305)
- Alzueta (1513, Titles of Pamplona)
- Alçuete and Alçueta (1350))
- Alchuete (1387)
- Alchuette (1387)
- Alçueta (1621, Martin Biscay)
- Alsiette (1667, regulations of the States of Navarre)

The Basque name for the people of this area is Alzietar.

According to Jean-Baptiste Orpustan, Alciette is derived from the medieval Alzueta which itself comes from the Basque alzu meaning "place where there are abundant alder trees".

Bascassan

The name Bascassan appears in the forms:

- Bazquazen (1208)
- Bascaçen (1292)
- Bascacen (1350))
- Bazcacen (1366))
- Basquacen (1413))
- Bazcacen (1513, Titles of Pamplona)
- Vazquacen (1613)
- Vazcazen and Vazaçan (1621 Martin Biscay)
- Bascassan (1789)

Its origin is uncertain. The people of the area are called Bazkazandar in basque.

Ahaxachillo is mentioned in the 1863 dictionary.)

Bastida is also indicated by Raymond.

Errékaldéa is mentioned with the spelling Errecaldia referring to the flowing stream of Bascassan flowing into the Laurhibar.

Curutchet

Curutchet (also called Garat) was a former fief of Ahaxe, a vassal of the Kingdom of Navarre.

Etcheverria

Paul Raymond mentioned an Etcheberry, a fief located in the parish of Alciette and a vassal of the Kingdom of Navarre.

Garatehegi

The name Garatehegi appears in the forms:

- Garateguia (1350)
- sent jullian et garateheguj (1366)
- la parropie de garatehegi (1413)
- Garatteguy (1518, Titles of Pamplona)
- Garatéhéguy (1708, Regulation of the commander of Irissarry)
- Garateguy (1863)

Garatehegi from Basque means "summit of the high country".

Gastelua

Gastelua appears with the spelling Gastellu in 1863.

Libiéta

Libiéta is a toponym that appears in the forms:

- Libiet (1621, Martin Biscay)
- Libiette (1789)

Ligeta

Ligeta is mentioned in the forms:

- Lagueta (1264)
- Ligueta (1307)
- Liguete (1350), 1366, and 1413).

The origin of this toponym could be the Latin Liger (which was equally likely to be the origin of Loire).

== History ==
The Lordship of Ahaxe, also called the Lordship of Cize, was allied with the Viscounts of Arbéroue in the 11th century as well as the lordships of Guiche and to the Counts of Biscay.

Ahaxe and Alciette-Bascassan were reunited on 11 June 1842.

== Heraldry ==
Arms of Ahaxe-Alciette-Bascassan	Blazon: Quarterly at one and four party per pale Azure with three escallops of Argent and Or with three bars in gules; at two gules with three escallops of Argent and bordure engrailed in Argent; at three Argent with bend engrailed in gules between two escallops gules.

== Administration ==
List of Successive Mayors of Ahaxe-Alciette-Bascassan

From	To	Name	Party
1995	2008	Simone Ithurbide	
2008	2026	Jean-Paul Bidart	DVD

=== Inter-communality ===
The commune belongs to seven inter-communal structures:

- the Communauté d'agglomération du Pays Basque;
- the AEP union of Ahaxe-Lecumberry-Mendive;
- the energy union of Pyrenees-Atlantiques;
- the RPI (Intercommunal Education) union Hergaray;
- the inter-communal union for the development and management of the abattoir of Saint-Jean-Pied-de-Port;
- the joint association for the watershed of the Nive;
- the union to support Basque culture.

== Population ==
Historical population

Year	Pop.	±% p.a.
1793	474	—
1821	460	−0.11%
1846	864	+2.55%
1872	674	−0.95%
1901	576	−0.54%
1926	462	−0.88%
1946	419	−0.49%
1962	344	−1.23%
1968	335	−0.44%

Year	Pop.	±% p.a.
1975	307	−1.24%
1982	265	−2.08%
1990	263	−0.09%
1999	320	+2.20%
2007	290	−1.22%
2012	283	−0.49%
2017	274	−0.64%
2023	261	−0.81%

Source: EHESS and INSEE

== Economy ==
Economic activity is mainly agricultural. The commune is part of the zone designation of the Ossau-Iraty cheese.

== Culture and heritage ==
=== Languages ===
According to the Map of the Seven Basque Provinces published in 1863 by Prince Louis-Lucien Bonaparte, the Basque dialect spoken in Ahaxe-Alciette-Bascassan is eastern low Navarrese.

=== Civil heritage ===
There is a gaztelu zahar (a prehistoric fortified complex) at a place called Gaztalepo (Ahaxe), located 550 metres above sea level. There is also a lice or a fence surrounding a fortification running at 313 metres above sea level at a place called Gaztelua or Gastellia. These artifacts represent the ancient past of the commune.

There are several buildings, houses, and farms in the commune that are listed as historical monuments. These are:

- Houses and Farms (17th - 19th centuries)
- Kapila House
- Idioinea farm (17th century)
- Gohonetxea farm (17th century)
- Château Saint-Julien (12th century)

=== Religious Heritage ===
A number of churches and sites in the commune have been classified as historical monuments. These are:

- Parish Church of Saint Julien of Antioch (16th century) The cemetery contains a remarkable collection of Hilarri.
Hilarri in the Saint Julien Church Cemetery
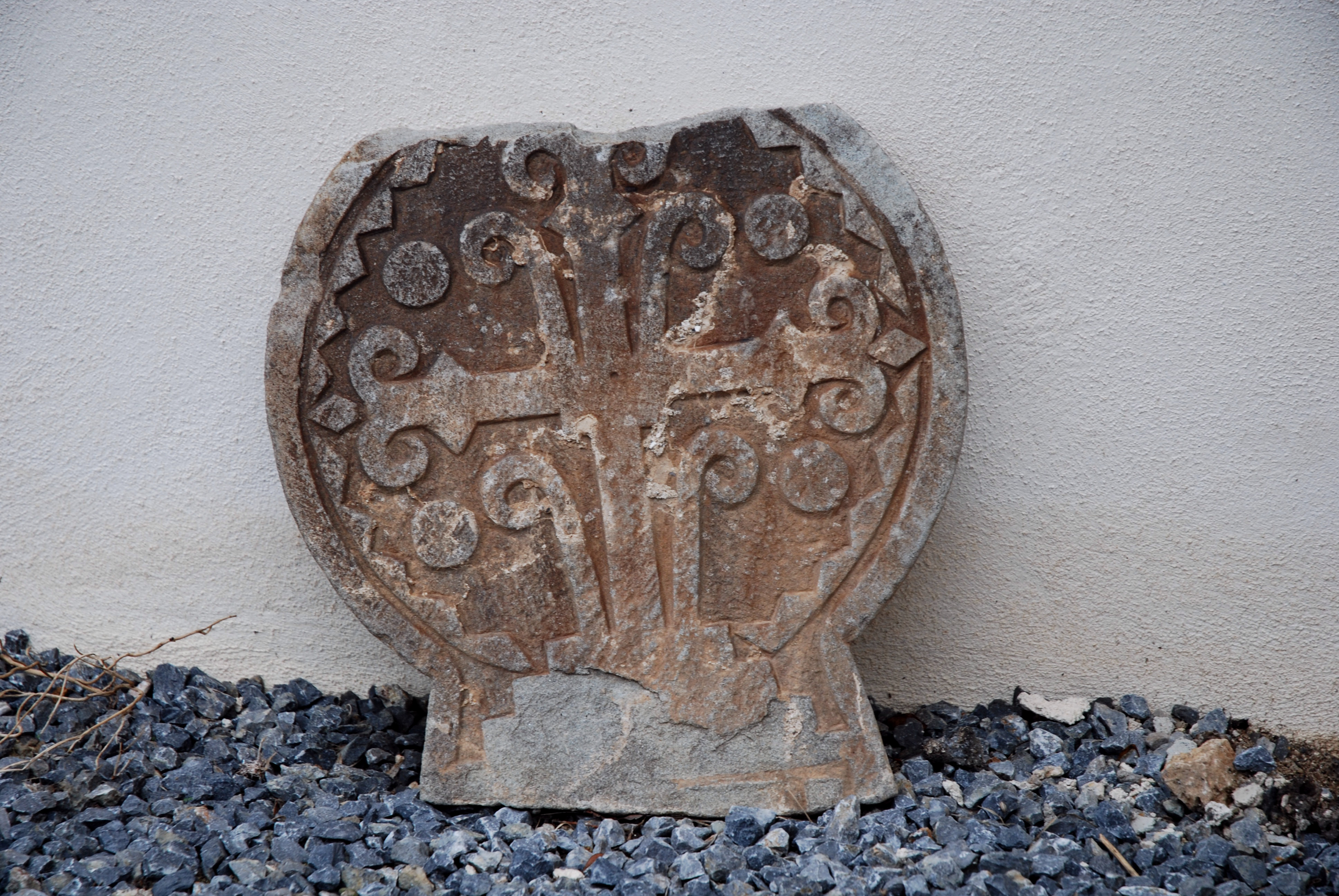

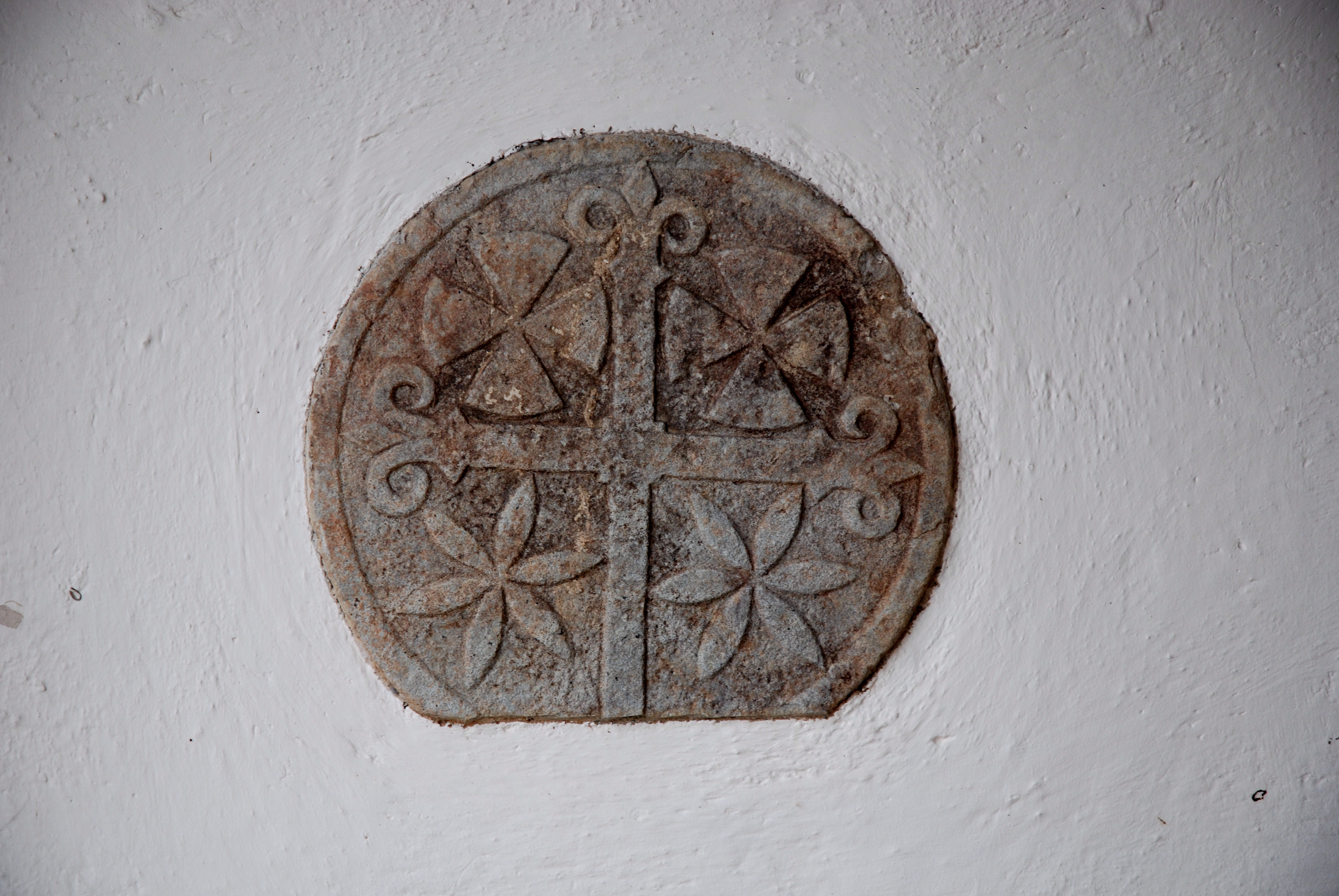

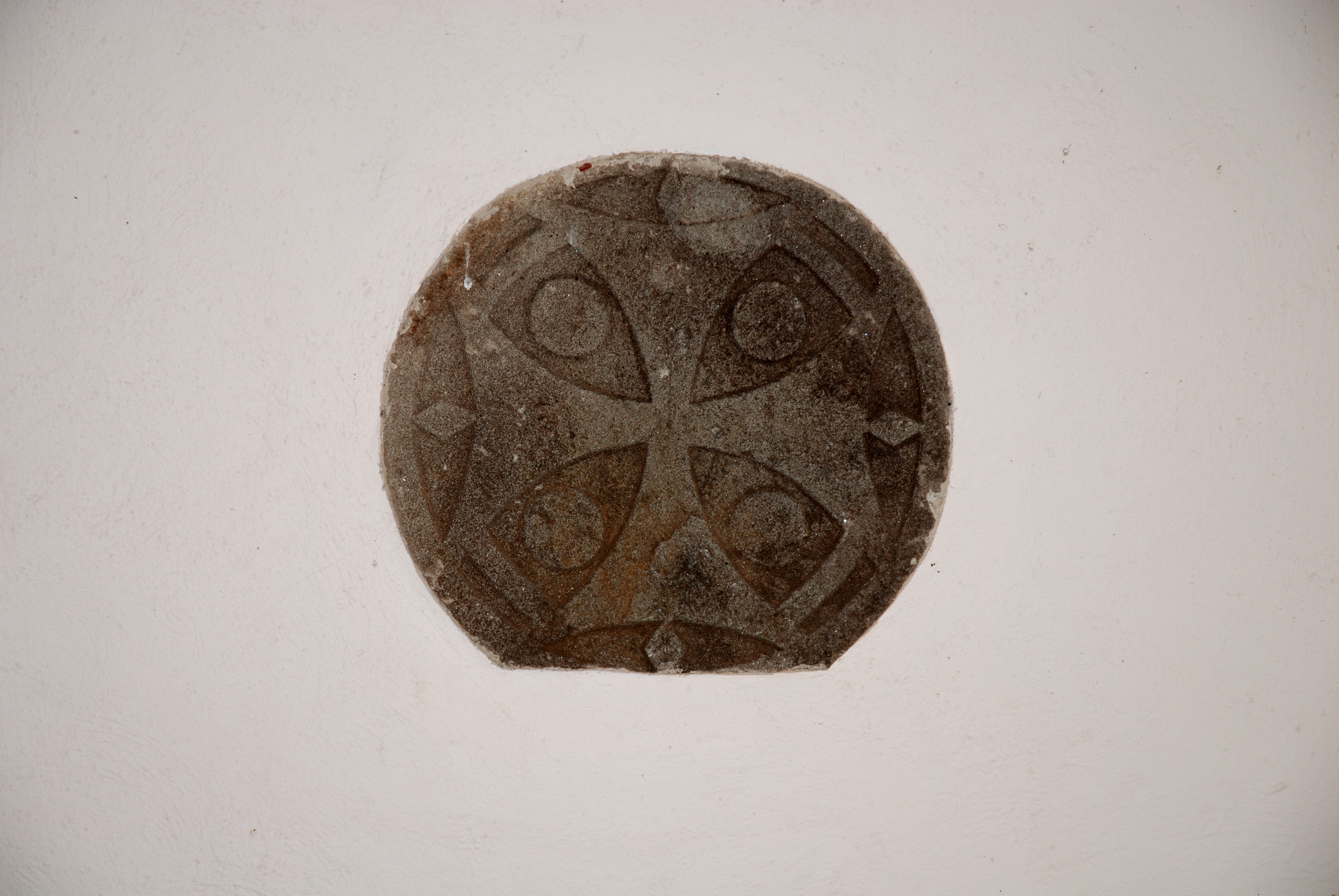
- Chapel of Saint-Saveur of Alciette (12th century). The chapel contains several historical objects:
  - Pulpit (17th century)
  - 2 Benches (17th & 18th century)
  - Main Altar, Retable and 4 Candlesticks (17th century)
  - Secondary Altar. Retable, 2 Candlesticks (17th century)
  - Baptismal fonts (17th century)
  - Ceiling (17th century)
  - Statue: Baby Jesus (18th century)
  - Processional Cross (18th century)
  - Cross: Christ on the Cross (17th century)
- Chapel of Saint-Saveur of Alciette (Interior Decor)
- Former benoîterie of Bascassan (18th century).
- Former benoîterie of Bascassan garden.
- Church of Saint-André-de-Bascassan (17th century). The church contains a number of historical objects. These are:
  - 2 Altars, 2 Retables, 2 Paintings, 4 Candlesticks (17th century)
  - Baptismal fonts (17th century)
  - Pulpit (17th century)
  - Processional Cross (18th century)
  - Cross: Christ on the Cross (17th century)
  - Bronze Bell (17th century)
- Church of Saint-André-de-Bascassan (Interior and Cemetery)
- Cemetery Cross of Ahaxe (1827)
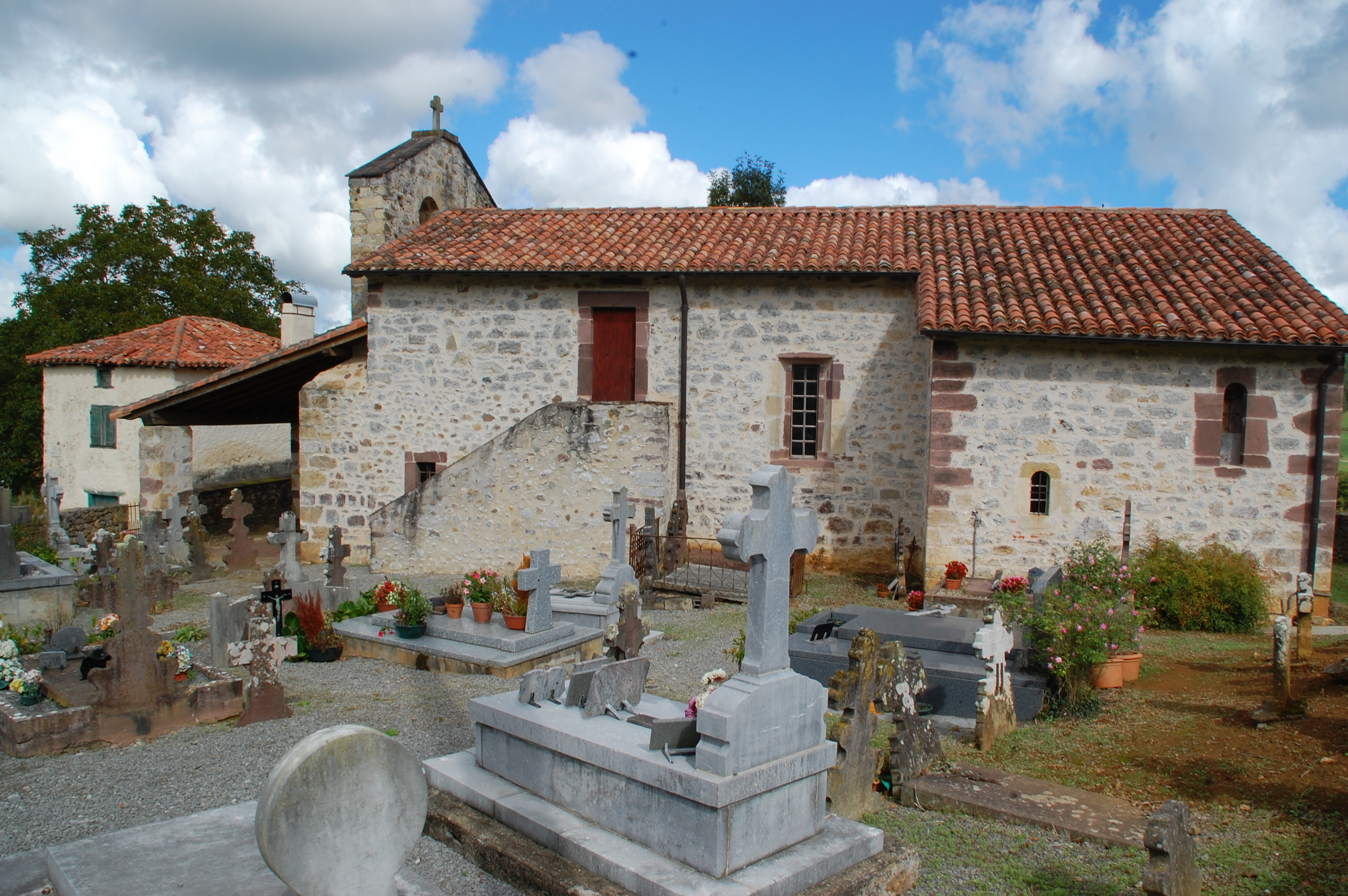
Church of Bascassan

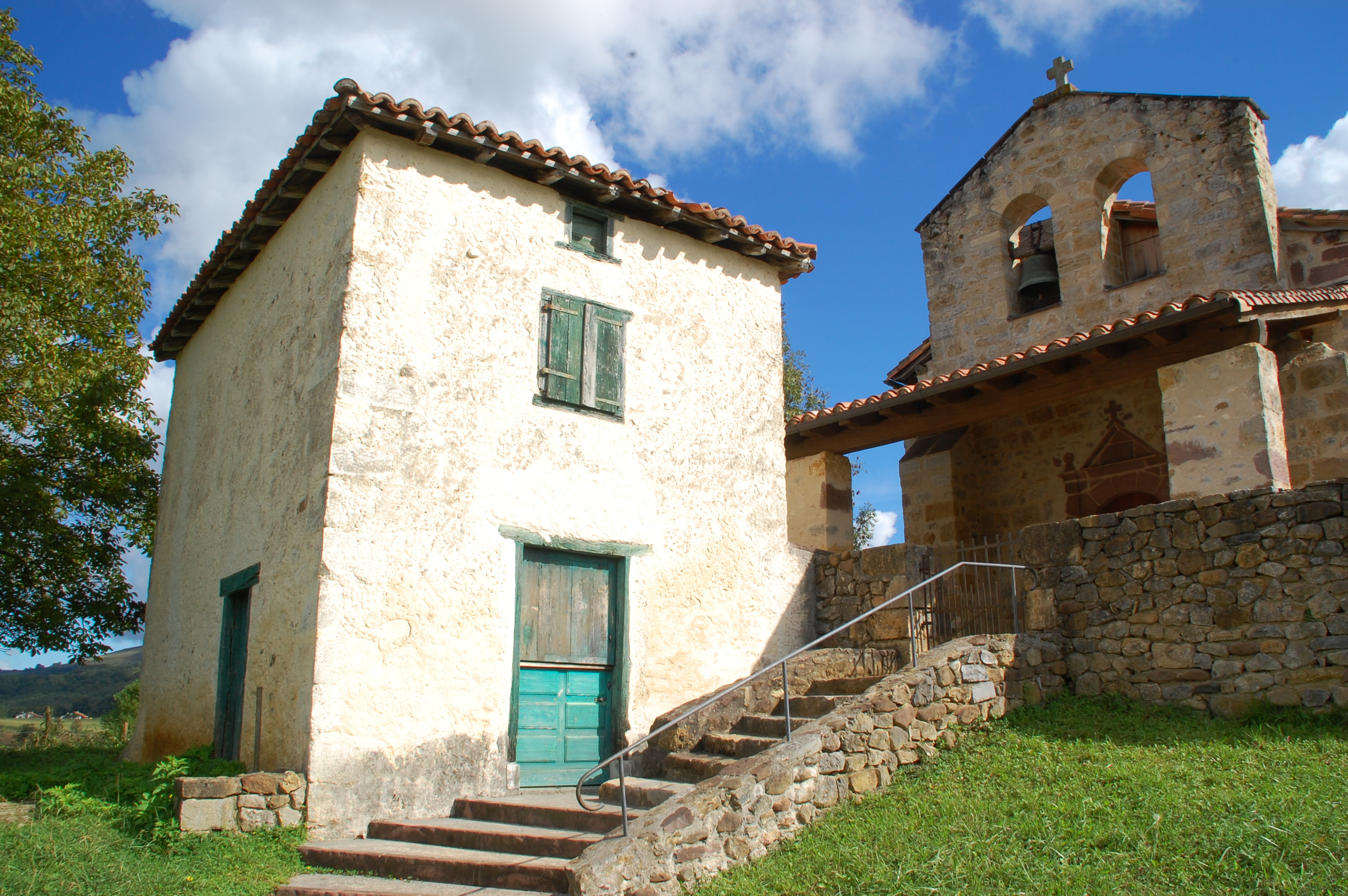
Benoîterie

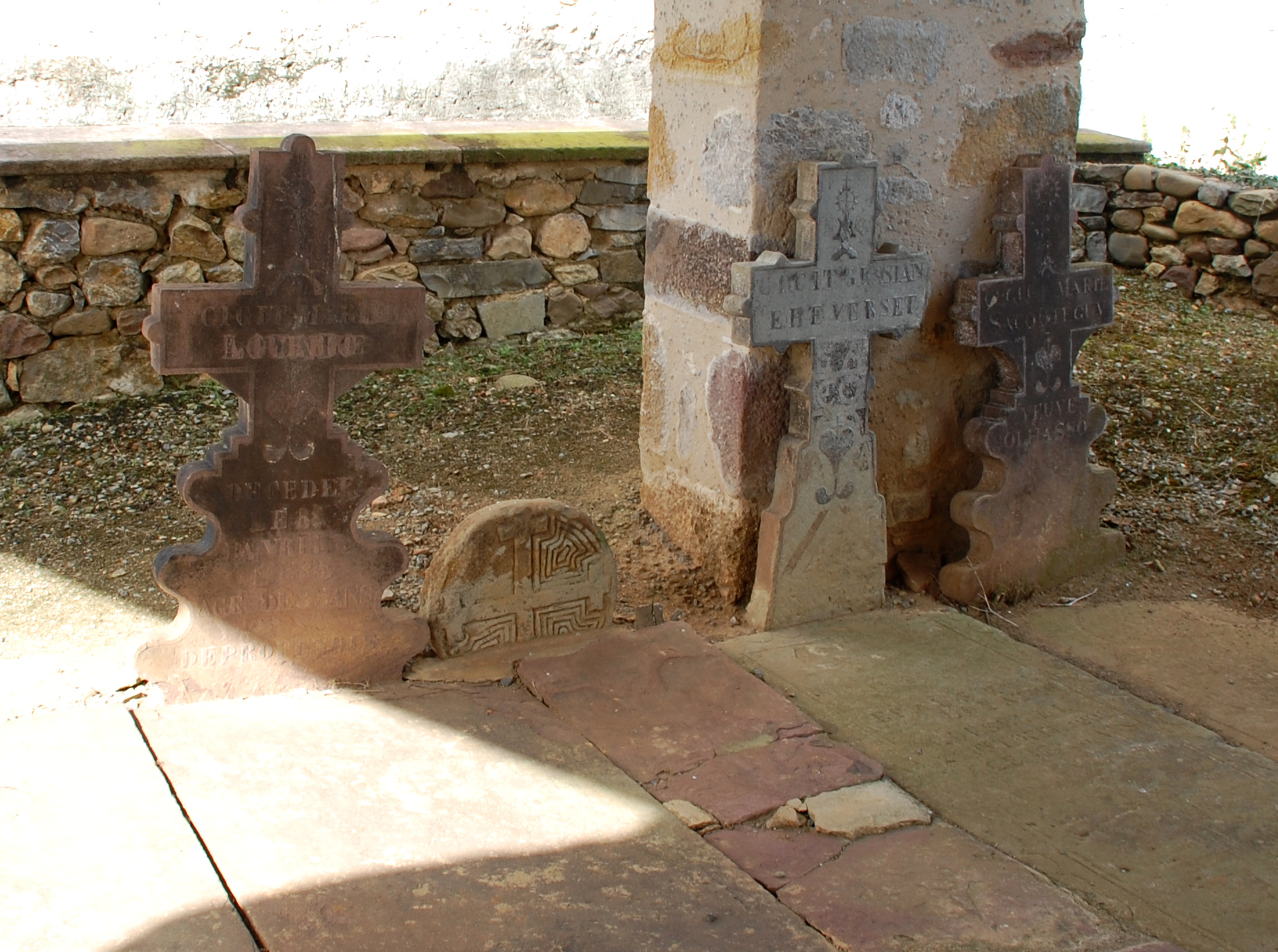
Old Tombs

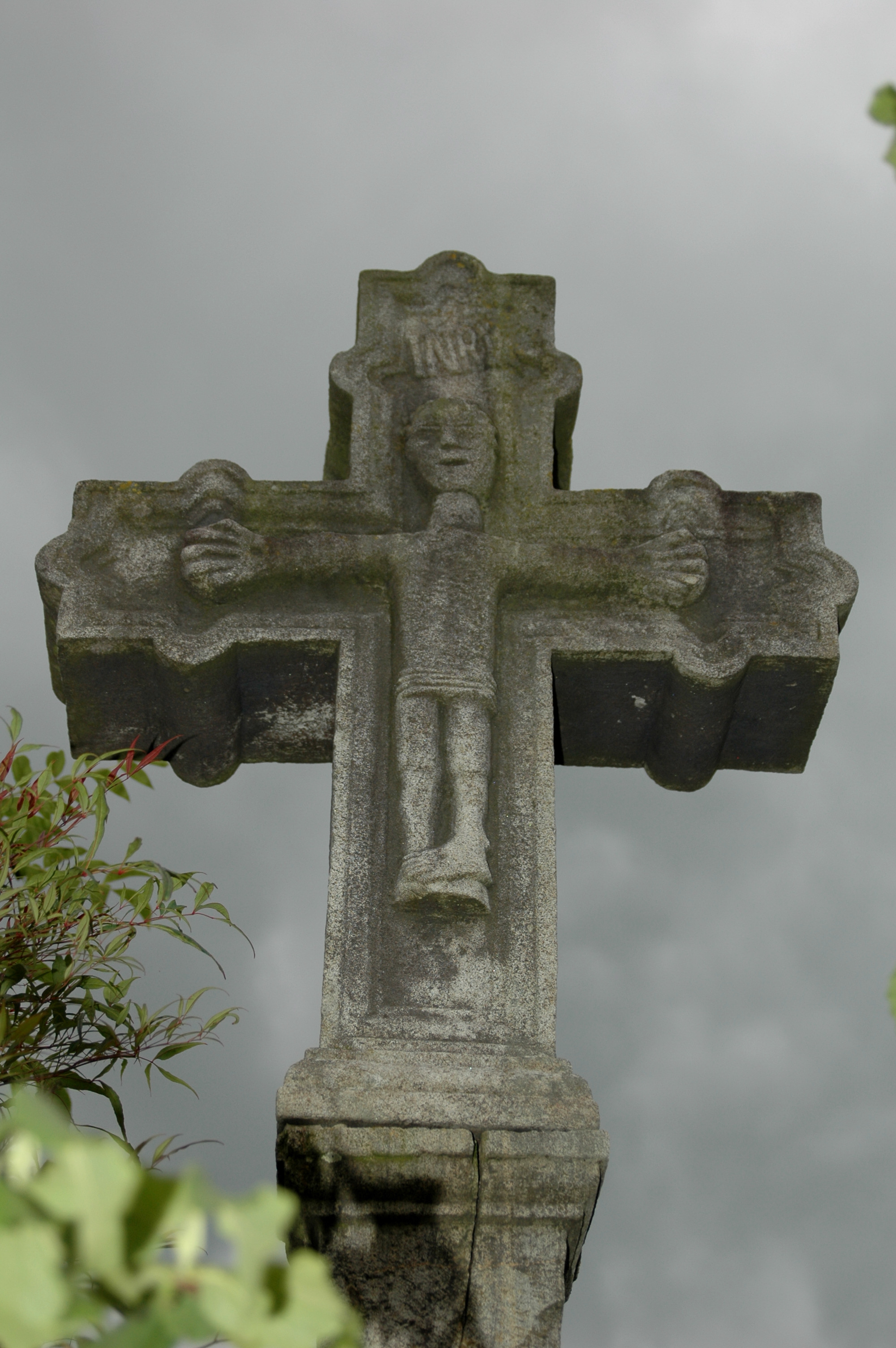
Cemetery Cross of Ahaxe

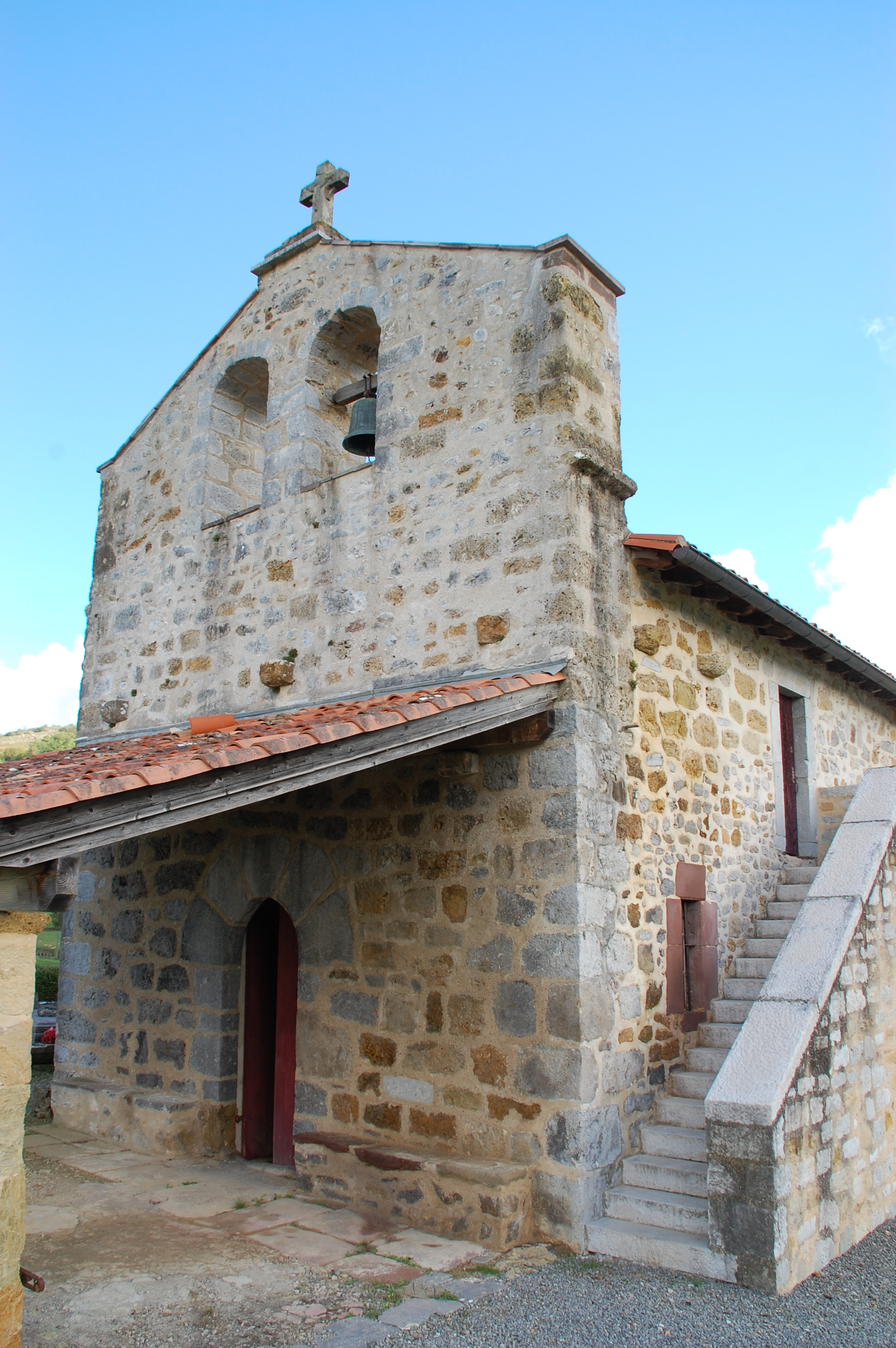
Church of Saint-Sauveur of Alciette

== Facilities ==
The commune has a kindergarten.

== See also ==
- Communes of the Pyrénées-Atlantiques department
