= Zaro =

Zaro may refer to:

- Zarathushtra - intermediate reconstructed form of [zɒːrɒː]
- Çaro, Pyrénées-Atlantiques - in Basque orthography
