= Lekunberri =

Lekunberri may refer to:

- Lekunberri, Spain - a municipality in the province of Navarre (Navarra), northern Spain.
- Lekunberri (France) - a small village in the province of Basse-Navarre, southern France.
