= Jaxu =

Jaxu Iatsu
- Commune
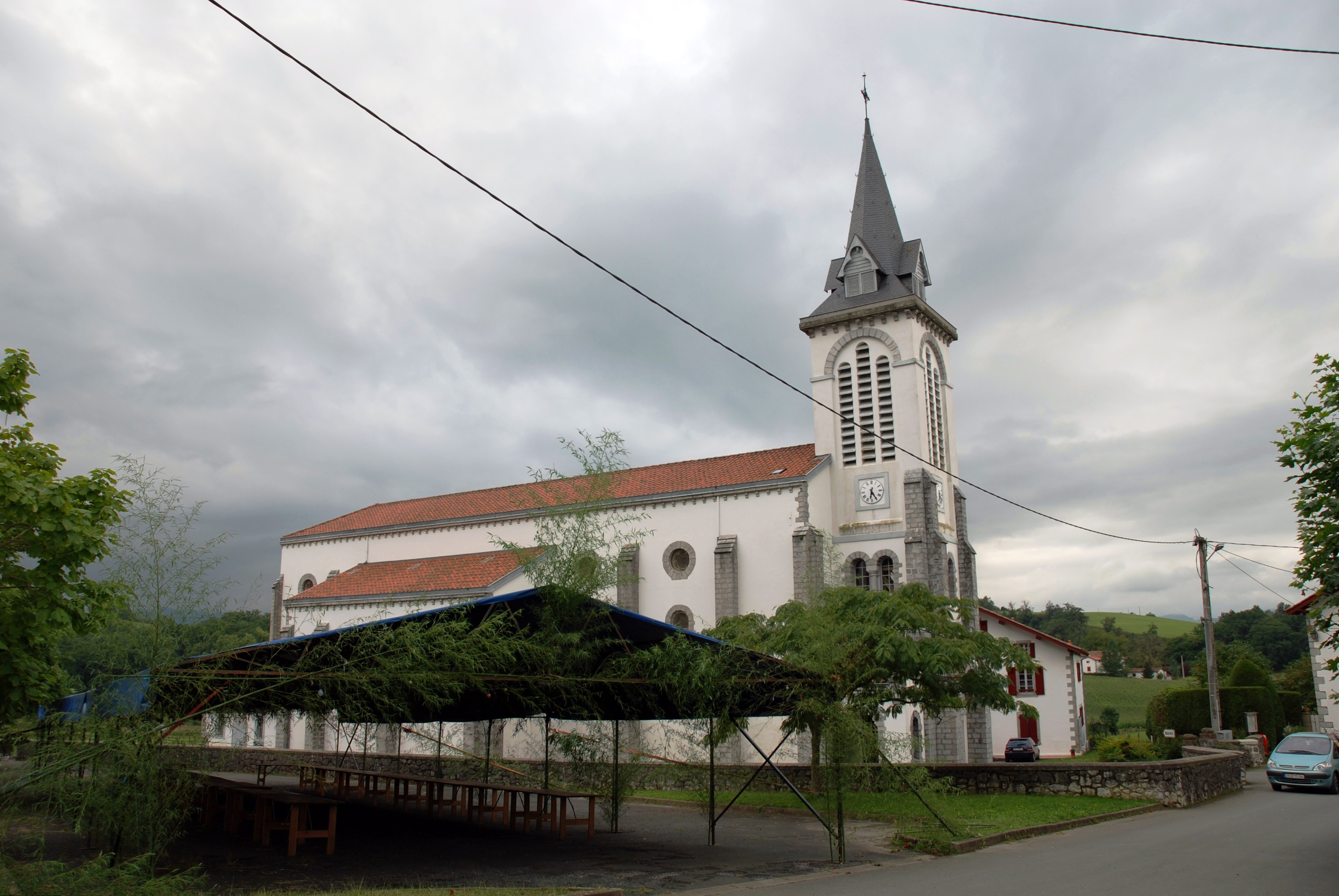
- Church of Saint Francis Xavier

- Coat of arms
- Location of Jaxu
- Location within France Location within Nouvelle-Aquitaine
- Coordinates: 43°11′56″N 1°11′28″W
- Country: France
- Region: Nouvelle-Aquitaine
- Department: Pyrénées-Atlantiques
- Arrondissement: Bayonne
- Canton: Montagne Basque
- Intercommunality: CA Pays Basque

Government
  - Mayor (2020–2026): Michel Aldacourrou
- Area^{1}: 10.65 km^{2} (4.11 sq mi)
- Elevation: 253 m (830 ft)
- Highest elevation: 555 m (1,821 ft)
- Lowest elevation: 179 m (587 ft)
- Population (2023): 206
  - Density: 19.3/km^{2} (50.1/sq mi)
- Time zone: UTC+01:00 (CET)
  - Summer (DST): UTC+02:00 (CEST)
- INSEE/Postal code: 64283 /64220
- ^{1} French Land Register data, which excludes lakes, ponds, glaciers > 1 km^{2} (0.386 sq mi or 247 acres) and river estuaries.

Jaxu (French pronunciation: [ʒaksy]; Basque: Iatsu) is a commune in the Pyrénées-Atlantiques department and Nouvelle-Aquitaine region of south-western France.

It is located in the former province of Lower Navarre.

== See also ==
- Communes of the Pyrénées-Atlantiques department
