= Mendive =

Mendive Mendibe
- Commune
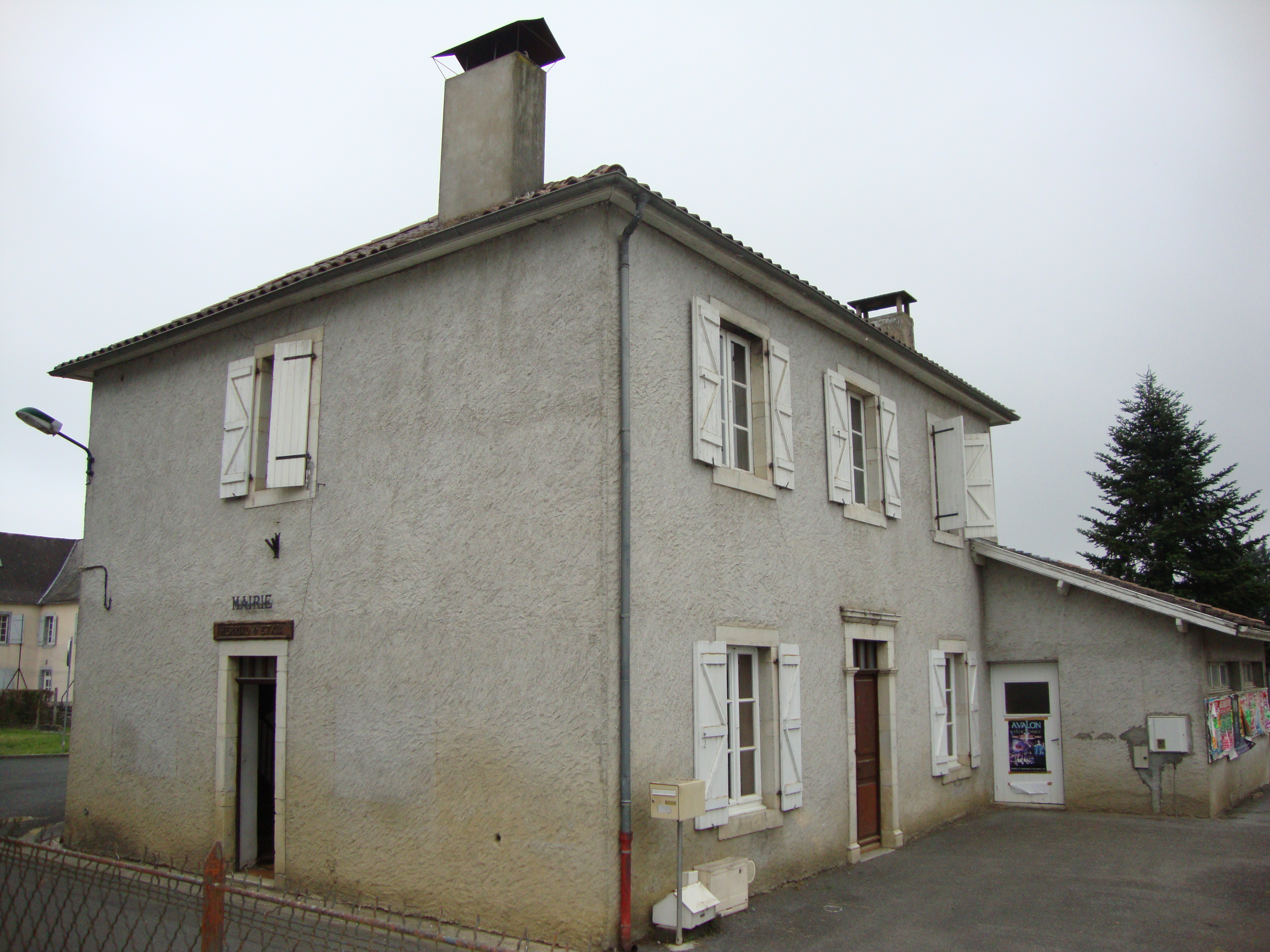
- The town hall (mayor's office) of Menditte

- Coat of arms
- Location of Mendive
- Location within France Location within Nouvelle-Aquitaine
- Coordinates: 43°07′57″N 1°07′50″W
- Country: France
- Region: Nouvelle-Aquitaine
- Department: Pyrénées-Atlantiques
- Arrondissement: Bayonne
- Canton: Montagne Basque
- Intercommunality: CA Pays Basque

Government
  - Mayor (2020–2026): Sébastien Ihidoy
- Area^{1}: 41.77 km^{2} (16.13 sq mi)
- Elevation: 565 m (1,854 ft)
- Highest elevation: 1,441 m (4,728 ft)
- Lowest elevation: 260 m (850 ft)
- Population (2023): 172
  - Density: 4.12/km^{2} (10.7/sq mi)
- Time zone: UTC+01:00 (CET)
  - Summer (DST): UTC+02:00 (CEST)
- INSEE/Postal code: 64379 /64220
- ^{1} French Land Register data, which excludes lakes, ponds, glaciers > 1 km^{2} (0.386 sq mi or 247 acres) and river estuaries.

Mendive (French pronunciation: [mɛ̃div]; Occitan: Mendic; Basque: Mendibe) is a commune in the Pyrénées-Atlantiques department in south-western France.

It is located in the former province of Lower Navarre.

== See also ==
- Communes of the Pyrénées-Atlantiques department
