= Lichos =

- Commune
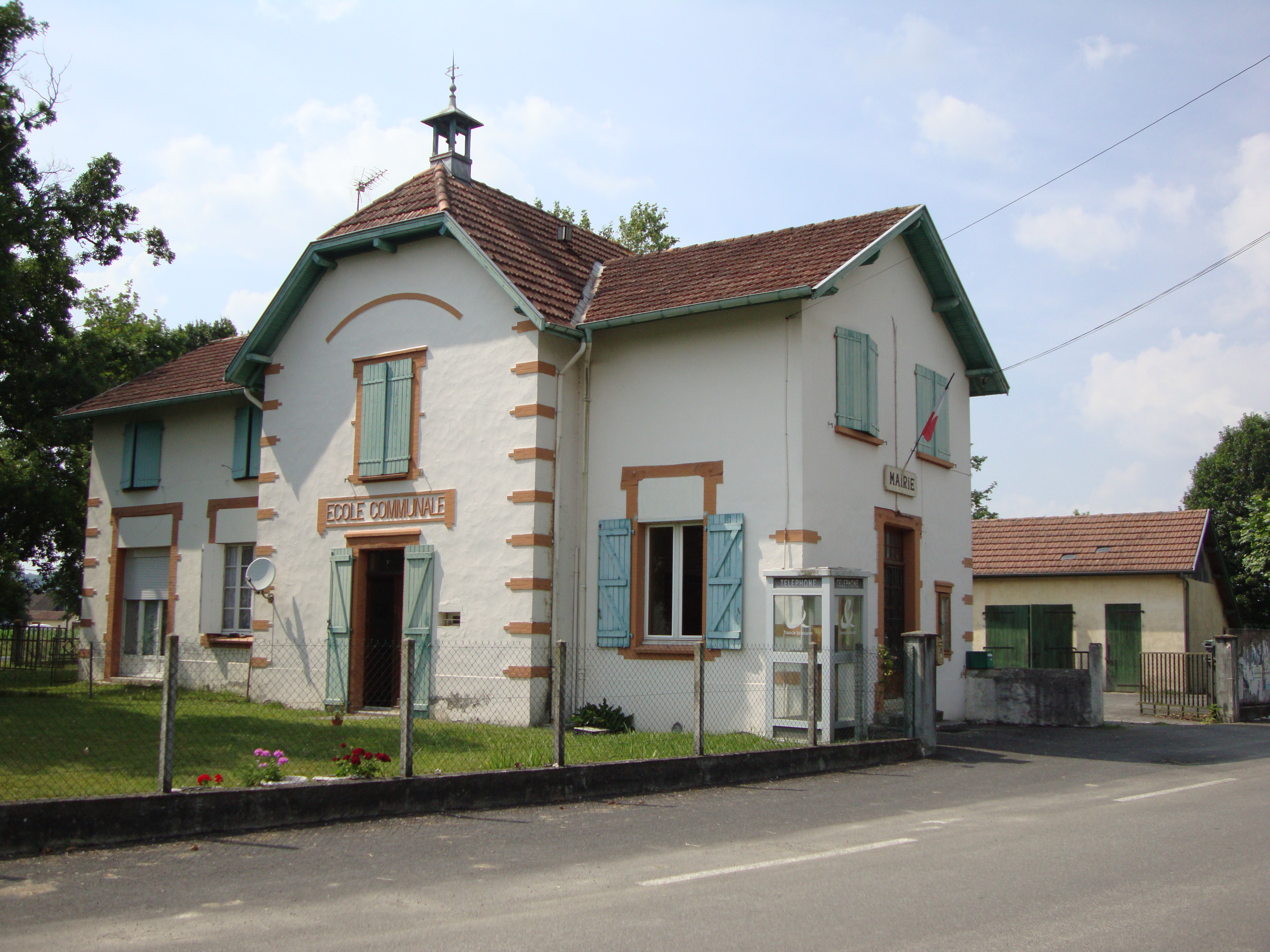
- The town hall and school of Lichos
- Location of Lichos
- Location within France Location within Nouvelle-Aquitaine
- Coordinates: 43°18′17″N 0°52′29″W
- Country: France
- Region: Nouvelle-Aquitaine
- Department: Pyrénées-Atlantiques
- Arrondissement: Oloron-Sainte-Marie
- Canton: Montagne Basque
- Intercommunality: CA Pays Basque

Government
  - Mayor (2020–2026): Marie-Pierre Vernassiere
- Area^{1}: 3.38 km^{2} (1.31 sq mi)
- Elevation: 156 m (512 ft)
- Highest elevation: 172 m (564 ft)
- Lowest elevation: 97 m (318 ft)
- Population (2023): 127
  - Density: 37.6/km^{2} (97.3/sq mi)
- Time zone: UTC+01:00 (CET)
  - Summer (DST): UTC+02:00 (CEST)
- INSEE/Postal code: 64341 /64130
- ^{1} French Land Register data, which excludes lakes, ponds, glaciers > 1 km^{2} (0.386 sq mi or 247 acres) and river estuaries.

Lichos (French pronunciation: [liʃɔs]; Basque: Lixoze; Gascon: Lishòs) is a commune in the Pyrénées-Atlantiques department in south-western France.

== See also ==
- Communes of the Pyrénées-Atlantiques department
