= Canton of Montagne Basque =

Coordinates: 43.22°N 0.89°W

The canton of Montagne Basque (Basque Euskal Mendialdea) is an administrative division of the Pyrénées-Atlantiques department, southwestern France. It was created at the French canton reorganisation which came into effect in March 2015. Its seat is in Mauléon-Licharre.

== Communes ==
It consists of the following communes:

1. Ahaxe-Alciette-Bascassan
2. Aincille
3. Ainharp
4. Ainhice-Mongelos
5. Alçay-Alçabéhéty-Sunharette
6. Aldudes
7. Alos-Sibas-Abense
8. Anhaux
9. Arnéguy
10. Arrast-Larrebieu
11. Ascarat
12. Aussurucq
13. Banca
14. Barcus
15. Béhorléguy
16. Berrogain-Laruns
17. Bidarray
18. Bussunarits-Sarrasquette
19. Bustince-Iriberry
20. Camou-Cihigue
21. Çaro
22. Charritte-de-Bas
23. Chéraute
24. Espès-Undurein
25. Estérençuby
26. Etchebar
27. Gamarthe
28. Garindein
29. Gotein-Libarrenx
30. Haux
31. L'Hôpital-Saint-Blaise
32. Idaux-Mendy
33. Irouléguy
34. Ispoure
35. Jaxu
36. Lacarre
37. Lacarry-Arhan-Charritte-de-Haut
38. Laguinge-Restoue
39. Larrau
40. Lasse
41. Lecumberry
42. Lichans-Sunhar
43. Lichos
44. Licq-Athérey
45. Mauléon-Licharre
46. Menditte
47. Mendive
48. Moncayolle-Larrory-Mendibieu
49. Montory
50. Musculdy
51. Ordiarp
52. Ossas-Suhare
53. Ossès
54. Roquiague
55. Sainte-Engrâce
56. Saint-Étienne-de-Baïgorry
57. Saint-Jean-le-Vieux
58. Saint-Jean-Pied-de-Port
59. Saint-Martin-d'Arrossa
60. Saint-Michel
61. Sauguis-Saint-Étienne
62. Tardets-Sorholus
63. Trois-Villes
64. Uhart-Cize
65. Urepel
66. Viodos-Abense-de-Bas
