= Bustince-Iriberry =

Bustince-Iriberry Bustintze-Hiriberry
- Commune
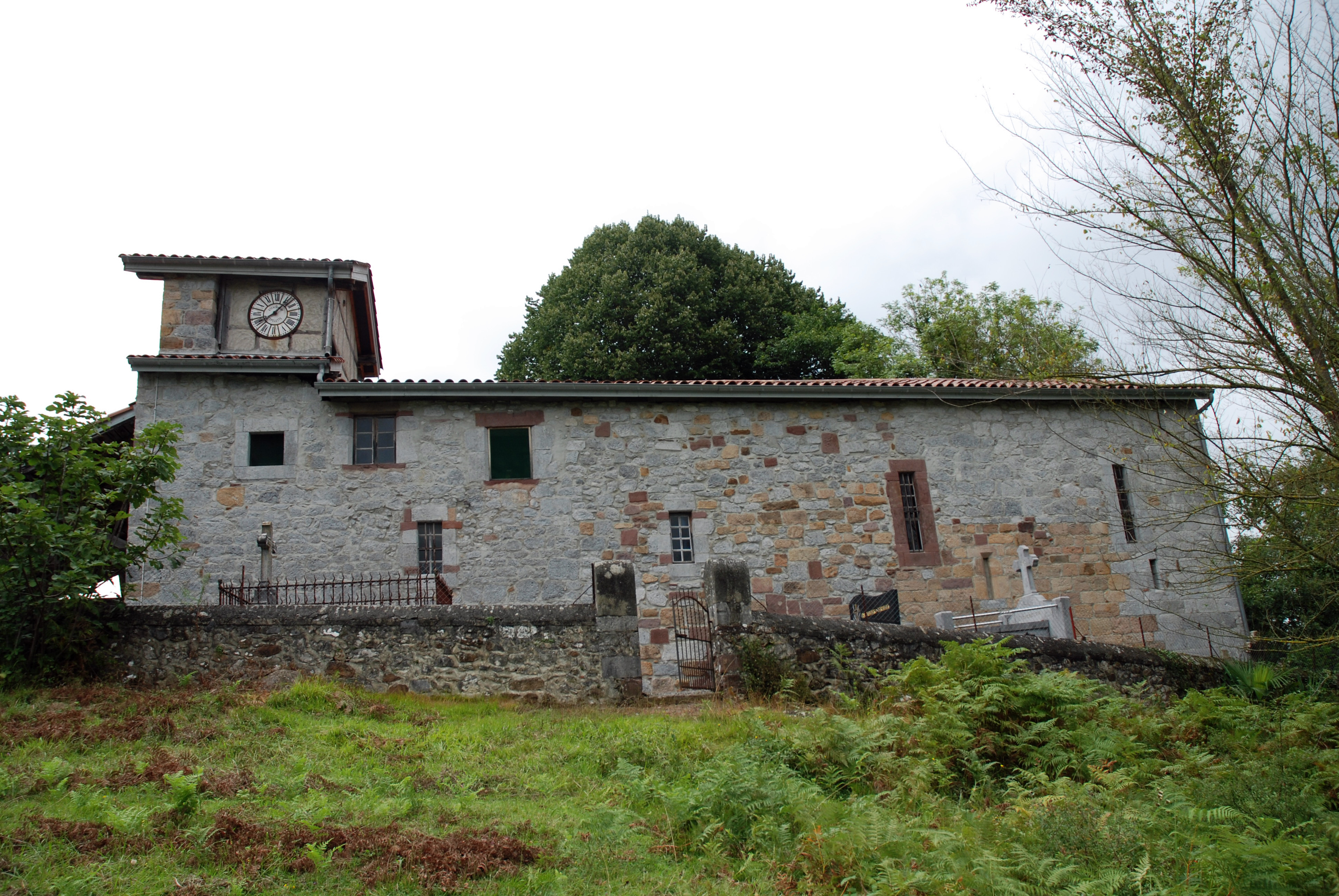
- The church of Bustince
- Location of Bustince-Iriberry
- Location within France Location within Nouvelle-Aquitaine
- Coordinates: 43°11′21″N 1°10′43″W
- Country: France
- Region: Nouvelle-Aquitaine
- Department: Pyrénées-Atlantiques
- Arrondissement: Bayonne
- Canton: Montagne Basque
- Intercommunality: CA Pays Basque

Government
  - Mayor (2020–2026): Henry Inchauspé
- Area^{1}: 5.67 km^{2} (2.19 sq mi)
- Elevation: 257 m (843 ft)
- Highest elevation: 383 m (1,257 ft)
- Lowest elevation: 192 m (630 ft)
- Population (2023): 102
  - Density: 18.0/km^{2} (46.6/sq mi)
- Time zone: UTC+01:00 (CET)
  - Summer (DST): UTC+02:00 (CEST)
- INSEE/Postal code: 64155 /64220
- ^{1} French Land Register data, which excludes lakes, ponds, glaciers > 1 km^{2} (0.386 sq mi or 247 acres) and river estuaries.

Bustince-Iriberry (French pronunciation: [bystɛ̃s iʁibeʁi]; Occitan: Bostir-Iriberri; Basque: Bustintze-Hiriberry) is a commune in the Pyrénées-Atlantiques department in southwestern France.

It is located in the former province of Lower Navarre.

== Climate ==
Climate data for Bustince-Iriberry (2003–2020 averages)
Month	Jan	Feb	Mar	Apr	May	Jun	Jul	Aug	Sep	Oct	Nov	Dec	Year
Record high °C (°F)	24.0 (75.2)	26.7 (80.1)	28.5 (83.3)	32.4 (90.3)	35.3 (95.5)	42.0 (107.6)	41.3 (106.3)	41.5 (106.7)	38.6 (101.5)	35.1 (95.2)	28.2 (82.8)	25.2 (77.4)	42.0 (107.6)
Mean daily maximum °C (°F)	11.8 (53.2)	12.6 (54.7)	15.3 (59.5)	18.1 (64.6)	20.7 (69.3)	24.4 (75.9)	26.2 (79.2)	26.4 (79.5)	24.5 (76.1)	21.1 (70.0)	15.4 (59.7)	13.0 (55.4)	19.1 (66.4)
Daily mean °C (°F)	7.3 (45.1)	7.6 (45.7)	10.0 (50.0)	12.7 (54.9)	15.4 (59.7)	18.9 (66.0)	20.7 (69.3)	20.6 (69.1)	18.4 (65.1)	15.6 (60.1)	10.8 (51.4)	8.2 (46.8)	13.9 (57.0)
Mean daily minimum °C (°F)	2.8 (37.0)	2.5 (36.5)	4.6 (40.3)	7.3 (45.1)	10.1 (50.2)	13.4 (56.1)	15.3 (59.5)	14.9 (58.8)	12.4 (54.3)	10.2 (50.4)	6.2 (43.2)	3.5 (38.3)	8.6 (47.5)
Record low °C (°F)	−8.3 (17.1)	−10.1 (13.8)	−9.6 (14.7)	−3.6 (25.5)	0.0 (32.0)	3.0 (37.4)	6.8 (44.2)	7.4 (45.3)	3.1 (37.6)	−1.9 (28.6)	−7.2 (19.0)	−8.0 (17.6)	−10.1 (13.8)
Average precipitation mm (inches)	158.0 (6.22)	113.2 (4.46)	122.9 (4.84)	121.5 (4.78)	119.5 (4.70)	100.2 (3.94)	64.2 (2.53)	68.1 (2.68)	82.4 (3.24)	93.6 (3.69)	169.7 (6.68)	114.1 (4.49)	1,327.4 (52.26)
Average precipitation days (≥ 1.0 mm)	14.3	11.1	12.7	13.4	13.2	10.4	9.1	9.1	8.5	9.6	13.0	12.6	136.9
Mean monthly sunshine hours	89.6	104.9	139.1	142.8	162.3	182.1	195.0	196.3	181.7	138.3	97.9	97.9	1,727.7
Source: Meteociel

== See also ==
- Communes of the Pyrénées-Atlantiques department
