= Saint-Martin-d'Arrossa =

Saint-Martin-d'Arrossa Arrosa (Basque)
- Commune
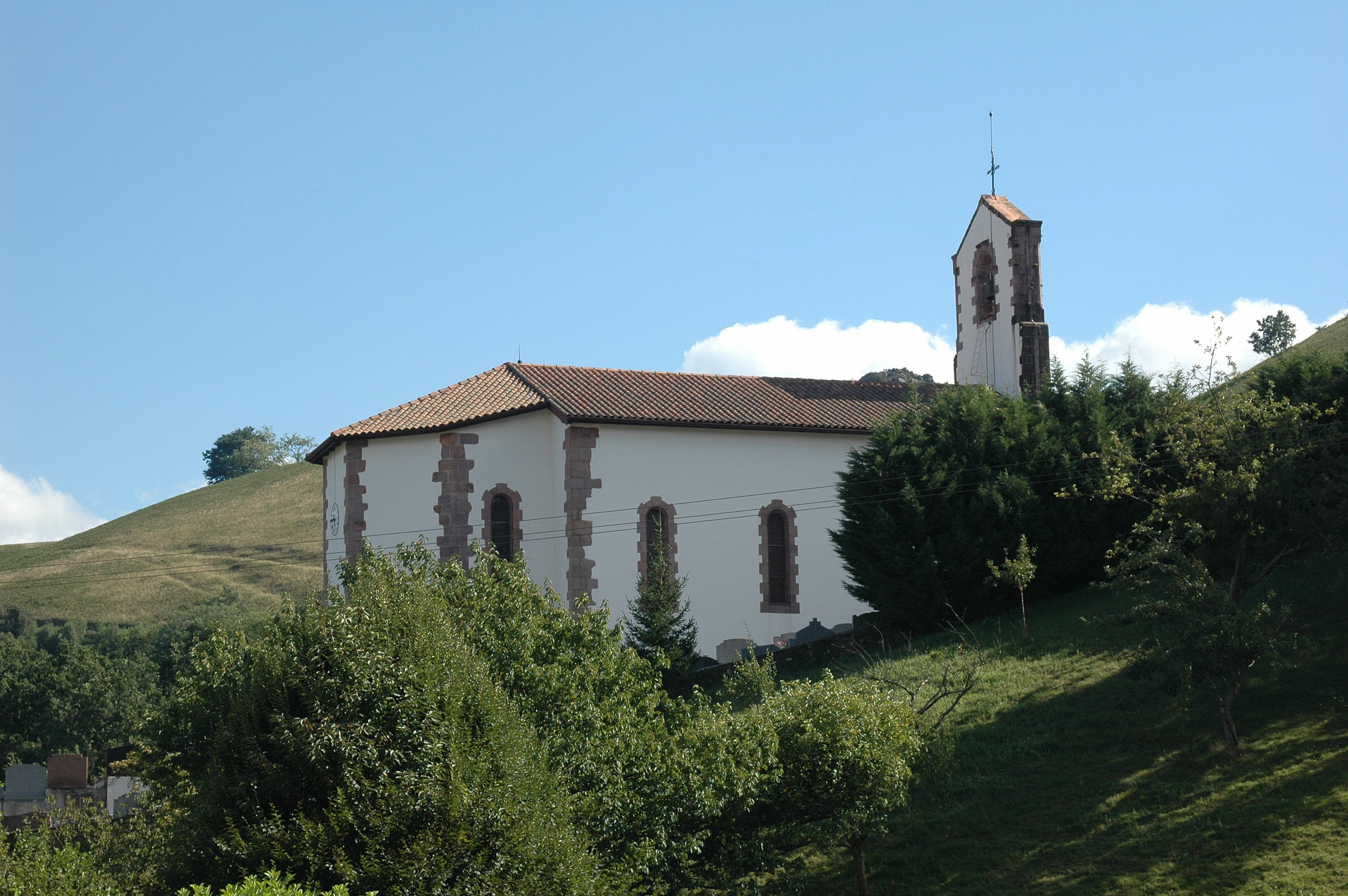
- The church of Saint-Martin-d'Arrossa

- Coat of arms
- Location of Saint-Martin-d'Arrossa
- Location within France Location within Nouvelle-Aquitaine
- Coordinates: 43°14′21″N 1°18′43″W
- Country: France
- Region: Nouvelle-Aquitaine
- Department: Pyrénées-Atlantiques
- Arrondissement: Bayonne
- Canton: Montagne Basque
- Intercommunality: CA Pays Basque

Government
  - Mayor (2020–2026): Beñat Arrabit
- Area^{1}: 18.43 km^{2} (7.12 sq mi)
- Elevation: 207 m (679 ft)
- Highest elevation: 810 m (2,660 ft)
- Lowest elevation: 100 m (330 ft)
- Population (2023): 543
  - Density: 29.5/km^{2} (76.3/sq mi)
- Time zone: UTC+01:00 (CET)
  - Summer (DST): UTC+02:00 (CEST)
- INSEE/Postal code: 64490 /64780
- ^{1} French Land Register data, which excludes lakes, ponds, glaciers > 1 km^{2} (0.386 sq mi or 247 acres) and river estuaries.

Saint-Martin-d'Arrossa (French pronunciation: [sɛ̃ maʁtɛ̃ daʁɔsa]; Occitan: Sent Martin d'Arrossa; Basque: Arrosa) is a commune in the Pyrénées-Atlantiques department in south-western France.

It is located in the former province of Lower Navarre.

The commune is served by the Ossès-Saint-Martin-d'Arrossa railway station, on the Bayonne to Saint-Jean-Pied-de-Port railway line, which is served by TER (local) services operated by the SNCF.

== See also ==
- Communes of the Pyrénées-Atlantiques department
