= Communauté d'agglomération du Pays Basque =

Coordinates: 43°18′N 1°13′W

Communauté Pays Basque / Euskal Hirigune Elkargoa
- Communauté d'agglomération

- Location within the Pyrénées-Atlantiques department
- Country: France
- Region: Nouvelle-Aquitaine
- Department: Pyrénées-Atlantiques
- No. of communes: {{{nbcomm}}}
- Established: 2017

Government
  - President: Alain Iriart (EH Bai)
- Area: 2,968 km^{2} (1,146 sq mi)
- Population (2018): 312,278
  - Density: 105.2/km^{2} (272.5/sq mi)
- Website: Communauté Pays Basque

The communauté d'agglomération du Pays Basque (Occitan: Comunautat d'aglomeracion deu País Basco; Basque: Euskal Hirigune Elkargoa, "agglomeration community of the Basque Country"), is the agglomeration community (federation of communes), centred on the cities of Bayonne and Biarritz. Also referred to as the French Basque Country, or Northern Basque Country (Basque: Iparralde (lit. 'the Northern Region'), French: Pays basque, Spanish: País Vasco francés), it is located in the Pyrénées-Atlantiques department, in the Nouvelle-Aquitaine region, southwestern France.

It was created in January 2017 by the merger of the former communauté de l'agglomération Côte Basque-Adour, communauté de l'agglomération Sud Pays Basque and eight communautés de communes. Its area is 2968 km^{2}. Its population was 312,278 in 2018, including 51,411 in Bayonne and 25,532 in Biarritz.

Since April 11, 2026, is presided by Alain Iriart, the abertzale mayor of Hiriburu.

== Composition ==
The Communauté d'agglomération du Pays Basque consists of the following 158 communes:

1. Ahaxe-Alciette-Bascassan
2. Ahetze
3. Aïcirits-Camou-Suhast
4. Aincille
5. Ainharp
6. Ainhice-Mongelos
7. Ainhoa
8. Alçay-Alçabéhéty-Sunharette
9. Aldudes
10. Alos-Sibas-Abense
11. Amendeuix-Oneix
12. Amorots-Succos
13. Anglet
14. Anhaux
15. Arancou
16. Arbérats-Sillègue
17. Arbonne
18. Arbouet-Sussaute
19. Arcangues
20. Arhansus
21. Armendarits
22. Arnéguy
23. Aroue-Ithorots-Olhaïby
24. Arrast-Larrebieu
25. Arraute-Charritte
26. Ascain
27. Ascarat
28. Aussurucq
29. Ayherre
30. Banca
31. Barcus
32. Bardos
33. Bassussarry
34. Bayonne
35. Béguios
36. Béhasque-Lapiste
37. Béhorléguy
38. Bergouey-Viellenave
39. Berrogain-Laruns
40. Beyrie-sur-Joyeuse
41. Biarritz
42. Bidache
43. Bidarray
44. Bidart
45. Biriatou
46. Bonloc
47. Boucau
48. Briscous
49. Bunus
50. Bussunarits-Sarrasquette
51. Bustince-Iriberry
52. Cambo-les-Bains
53. Came
54. Camou-Cihigue
55. Çaro
56. Charritte-de-Bas
57. Chéraute
58. Ciboure
59. Domezain-Berraute
60. Espelette
61. Espès-Undurein
62. Estérençuby
63. Etcharry
64. Etchebar
65. Gabat
66. Gamarthe
67. Garindein
68. Garris
69. Gotein-Libarrenx
70. Guéthary
71. Guiche
72. Halsou
73. Hasparren
74. Haux
75. Hélette
76. Hendaye
77. Hosta
78. Ibarrolle
79. Idaux-Mendy
80. Iholdy
81. Ilharre
82. Irissarry
83. Irouléguy
84. Ispoure
85. Isturits
86. Itxassou
87. Jatxou
88. Jaxu
89. Juxue
90. La Bastide-Clairence
91. Labets-Biscay
92. Lacarre
93. Lacarry-Arhan-Charritte-de-Haut
94. Laguinge-Restoue
95. Lahonce
96. Lantabat
97. Larceveau-Arros-Cibits
98. Larrau
99. Larressore
100. Larribar-Sorhapuru
101. Lasse
102. Lecumberry
103. L'Hôpital-Saint-Blaise
104. Lichans-Sunhar
105. Lichos
106. Licq-Athérey
107. Lohitzun-Oyhercq
108. Louhossoa
109. Luxe-Sumberraute
110. Macaye
111. Masparraute
112. Mauléon-Licharre
113. Méharin
114. Mendionde
115. Menditte
116. Mendive
117. Moncayolle-Larrory-Mendibieu
118. Montory
119. Mouguerre
120. Musculdy
121. Ordiarp
122. Orègue
123. Orsanco
124. Ossas-Suhare
125. Osserain-Rivareyte
126. Ossès
127. Ostabat-Asme
128. Pagolle
129. Roquiague
130. Sainte-Engrâce
131. Saint-Esteben
132. Saint-Étienne-de-Baïgorry
133. Saint-Jean-de-Luz
134. Saint-Jean-le-Vieux
135. Saint-Jean-Pied-de-Port
136. Saint-Just-Ibarre
137. Saint-Martin-d'Arberoue
138. Saint-Martin-d'Arrossa
139. Saint-Michel
140. Saint-Palais
141. Saint-Pée-sur-Nivelle
142. Saint-Pierre-d'Irube
143. Sames
144. Sare
145. Sauguis-Saint-Étienne
146. Souraïde
147. Suhescun
148. Tardets-Sorholus
149. Trois-Villes
150. Uhart-Cize
151. Uhart-Mixe
152. Urcuit
153. Urepel
154. Urrugne
155. Urt
156. Ustaritz
157. Villefranque
158. Viodos-Abense-de-Bas

== See also ==
- Government of Navarre
- Basque Government
