= Lichans-Sunhar =

Lichans-Sunhar Lexantzü-Zünharre
- Commune
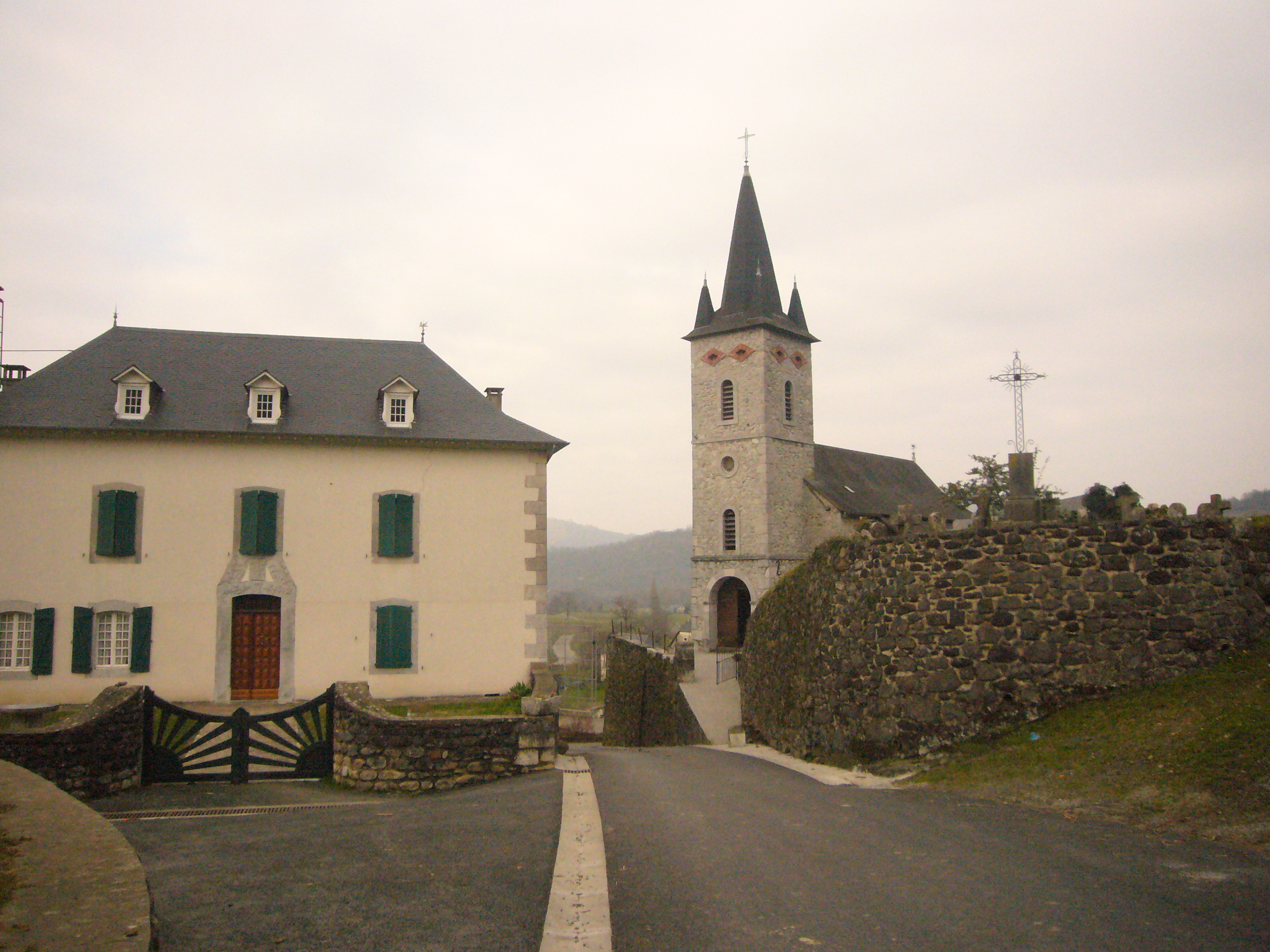
- The village of Lichans
- Location of Lichans-Sunhar
- Location within France Location within Nouvelle-Aquitaine
- Coordinates: 43°05′38″N 0°52′20″W
- Country: France
- Region: Nouvelle-Aquitaine
- Department: Pyrénées-Atlantiques
- Arrondissement: Oloron-Sainte-Marie
- Canton: Montagne Basque
- Intercommunality: CA Pays Basque

Government
  - Mayor (2020–2026): Monique Elgoyhen
- Area^{1}: 3.43 km^{2} (1.32 sq mi)
- Elevation: 245 m (804 ft)
- Highest elevation: 589 m (1,932 ft)
- Lowest elevation: 232 m (761 ft)
- Population (2023): 84
  - Density: 24/km^{2} (63/sq mi)
- Time zone: UTC+01:00 (CET)
  - Summer (DST): UTC+02:00 (CEST)
- INSEE/Postal code: 64340 /64470
- ^{1} French Land Register data, which excludes lakes, ponds, glaciers > 1 km^{2} (0.386 sq mi or 247 acres) and river estuaries.

Lichans-Sunhar (French pronunciation: [liʃɑ̃s synaʁ]; Occitan: Licans-Sonhar; Basque: Lexantzü-Zünharre) is a commune in the Pyrénées-Atlantiques department in south-western France.

It is located in the former province of Soule, and has a 12th-century Romanesque church.

== See also ==
- Communes of the Pyrénées-Atlantiques department
