= Roquiague =

Roquiague Arrokiaga (Basque)
- Commune
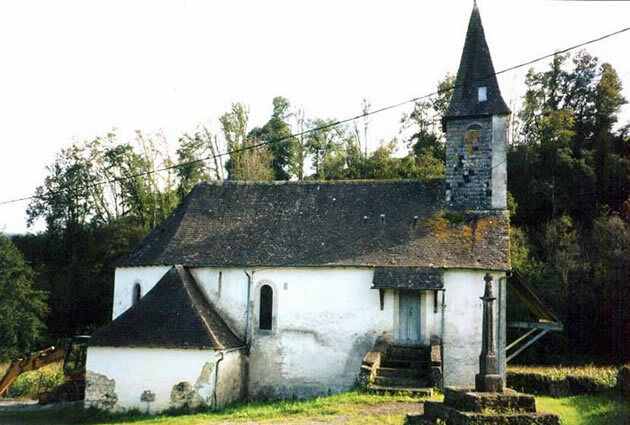
- The chapel of Roquiague
- Location of Roquiague
- Location within France Location within Nouvelle-Aquitaine
- Coordinates: 43°11′30″N 0°50′20″W
- Country: France
- Region: Nouvelle-Aquitaine
- Department: Pyrénées-Atlantiques
- Arrondissement: Oloron-Sainte-Marie
- Canton: Montagne Basque
- Intercommunality: CA Pays Basque

Government
  - Mayor (2020–2026): Sylvain Ayphassorho
- Area^{1}: 10.44 km^{2} (4.03 sq mi)
- Elevation: 221 m (725 ft)
- Highest elevation: 567 m (1,860 ft)
- Lowest elevation: 191 m (627 ft)
- Population (2023): 121
  - Density: 11.6/km^{2} (30.0/sq mi)
- Time zone: UTC+01:00 (CET)
  - Summer (DST): UTC+02:00 (CEST)
- INSEE/Postal code: 64468 /64130
- ^{1} French Land Register data, which excludes lakes, ponds, glaciers > 1 km^{2} (0.386 sq mi or 247 acres) and river estuaries.

Roquiague (French pronunciation: [ʁɔkjaɡ]; Occitan: Roquiaga; Basque: Arrokiaga) is a commune in the Pyrénées-Atlantiques department in south-western France.

It is located in the former province of Soule.

== See also ==
- Communes of the Pyrénées-Atlantiques department
