= Çaro =

Çaro Zaro
- Commune
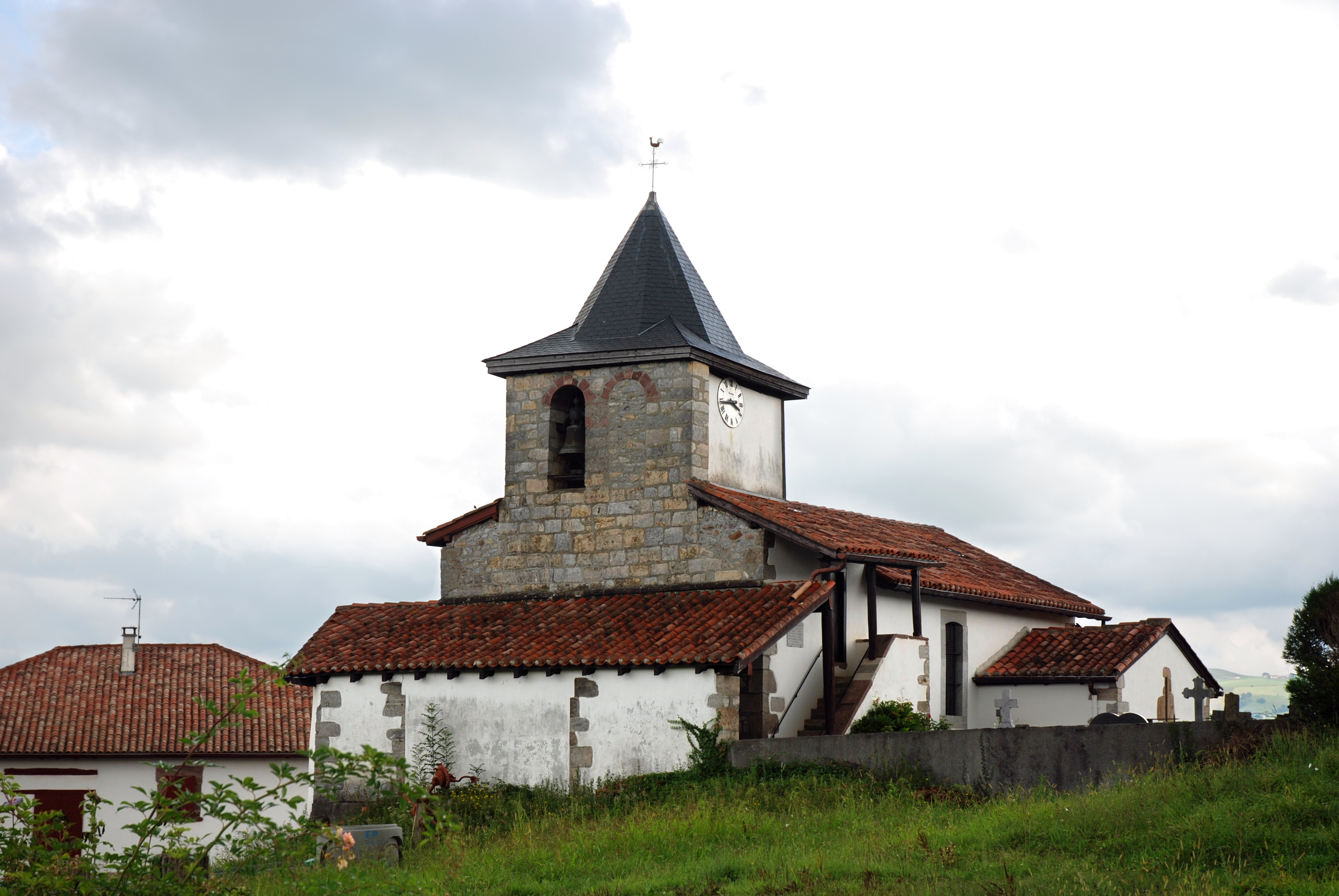
- The church of Çaro
- Location of Çaro
- Location within France Location within Nouvelle-Aquitaine
- Coordinates: 43°08′55″N 1°12′58″W
- Country: France
- Region: Nouvelle-Aquitaine
- Department: Pyrénées-Atlantiques
- Arrondissement: Bayonne
- Canton: Montagne Basque
- Intercommunality: CA Pays Basque

Government
  - Mayor (2020–2026): Robert Garicoïtz
- Area^{1}: 4.01 km^{2} (1.55 sq mi)
- Elevation: 205 m (673 ft)
- Highest elevation: 305 m (1,001 ft)
- Lowest elevation: 174 m (571 ft)
- Population (2023): 170
  - Density: 42/km^{2} (110/sq mi)
- Time zone: UTC+01:00 (CET)
  - Summer (DST): UTC+02:00 (CEST)
- INSEE/Postal code: 64166 /64220
- ^{1} French Land Register data, which excludes lakes, ponds, glaciers > 1 km^{2} (0.386 sq mi or 247 acres) and river estuaries.

Çaro (French pronunciation: [saʁo]; Basque: Zaro) is a commune in the Pyrénées-Atlantiques department in south-western France.

It is located in the former province of Lower Navarre.
