= Ossas-Suhare =

Ossas-Suhare Ozaze-Zühara (Basque)
- Commune
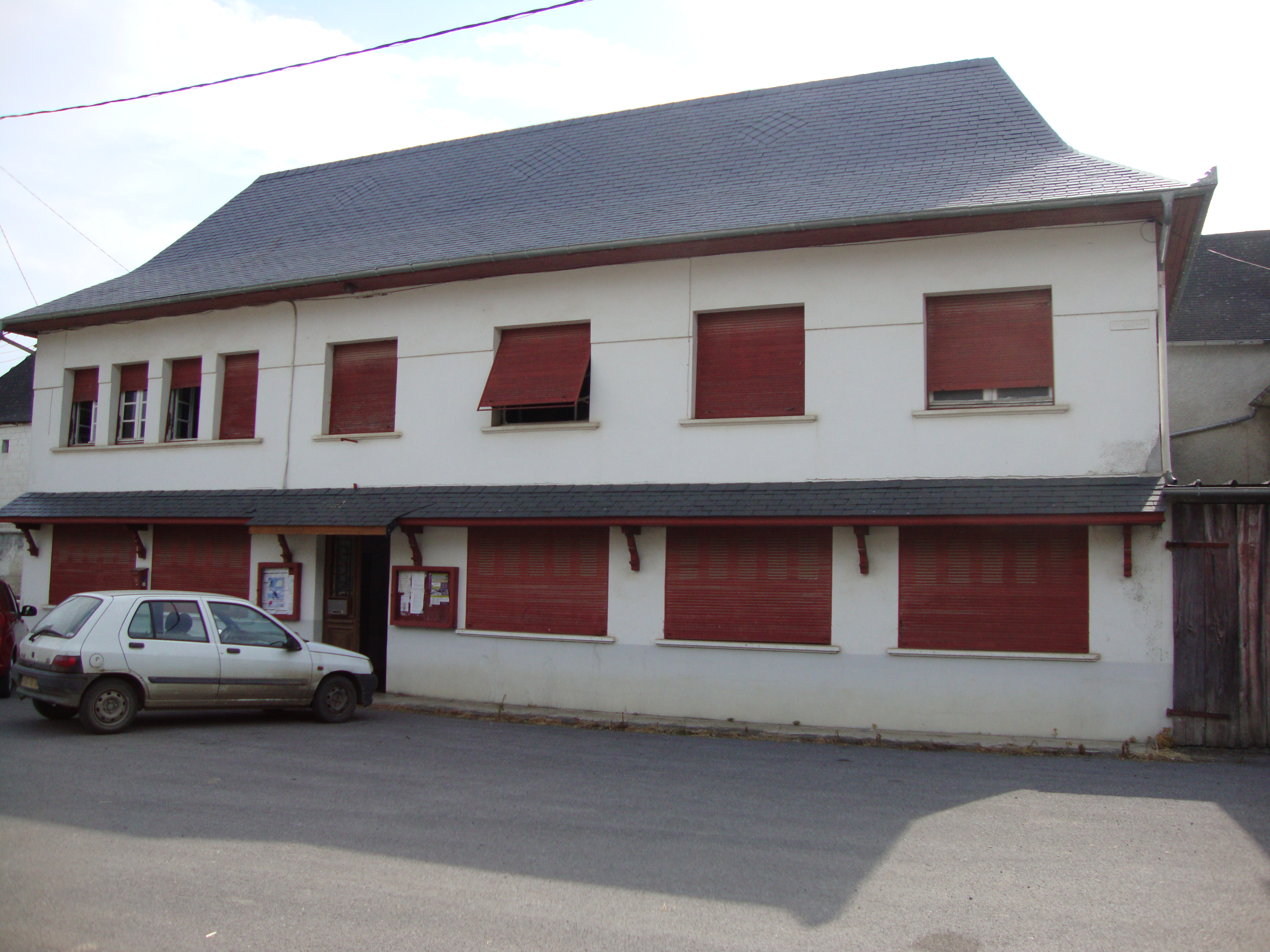
- The town hall of Ossas-Suhare
- Location of Ossas-Suhare
- Location within France Location within Nouvelle-Aquitaine
- Coordinates: 43°08′29″N 0°53′23″W
- Country: France
- Region: Nouvelle-Aquitaine
- Department: Pyrénées-Atlantiques
- Arrondissement: Oloron-Sainte-Marie
- Canton: Montagne Basque
- Intercommunality: CA Pays Basque

Government
  - Mayor (2020–2026): Maite Echeverria
- Area^{1}: 7.17 km^{2} (2.77 sq mi)
- Elevation: 238 m (781 ft)
- Highest elevation: 854 m (2,802 ft)
- Lowest elevation: 182 m (597 ft)
- Population (2023): 91
  - Density: 13/km^{2} (33/sq mi)
- Time zone: UTC+01:00 (CET)
  - Summer (DST): UTC+02:00 (CEST)
- INSEE/Postal code: 64432 /64470
- ^{1} French Land Register data, which excludes lakes, ponds, glaciers > 1 km^{2} (0.386 sq mi or 247 acres) and river estuaries.

Ossas-Suhare (French pronunciation: [ɔsas syaʁ]; Occitan: Os-Susar; Basque: Ozaze-Zühara) is a commune in the Pyrénées-Atlantiques department in south-western France.

It is located in the historical province of Soule.

== See also ==
- Communes of the Pyrénées-Atlantiques department
