= Chéraute =

Chéraute Sohüta
- Commune
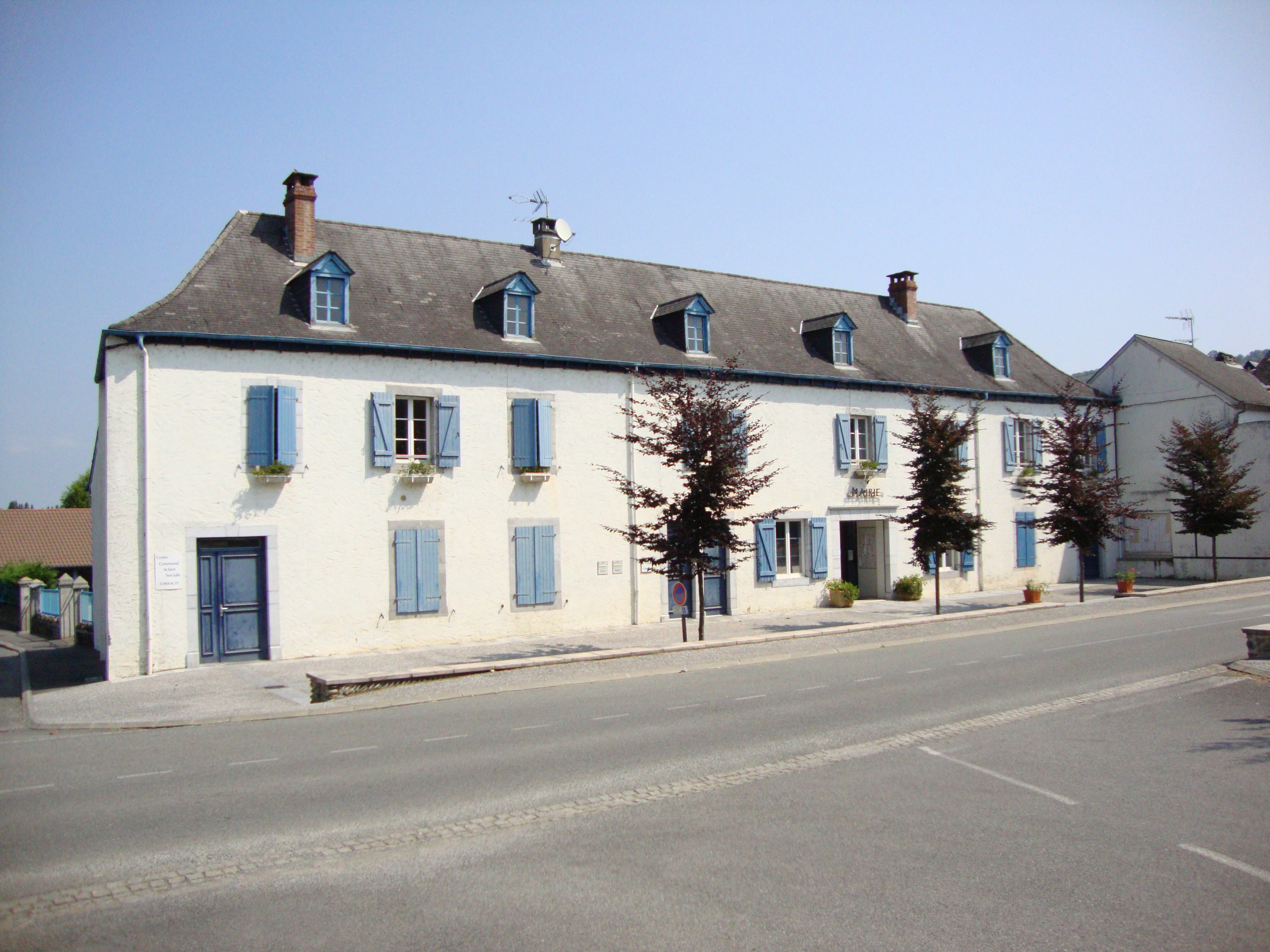
- The town hall of Chéraute

- Coat of arms
- Location of Chéraute
- Location within France Location within Nouvelle-Aquitaine
- Coordinates: 43°13′57″N 0°52′02″W
- Country: France
- Region: Nouvelle-Aquitaine
- Department: Pyrénées-Atlantiques
- Arrondissement: Oloron-Sainte-Marie
- Canton: Montagne Basque
- Intercommunality: CA Pays Basque

Government
  - Mayor (2020–2026): Christelle Mange
- Area^{1}: 35.26 km^{2} (13.61 sq mi)
- Elevation: 209 m (686 ft)
- Highest elevation: 558 m (1,831 ft)
- Lowest elevation: 127 m (417 ft)
- Population (2023): 1,043
  - Density: 29.58/km^{2} (76.61/sq mi)
- Time zone: UTC+01:00 (CET)
  - Summer (DST): UTC+02:00 (CEST)
- INSEE/Postal code: 64188 /64130
- ^{1} French Land Register data, which excludes lakes, ponds, glaciers > 1 km^{2} (0.386 sq mi or 247 acres) and river estuaries.

Chéraute (French pronunciation: [ʃeʁot]; Basque: Sohüta) is a commune in the Pyrénées-Atlantiques department in south-western France.

It is located in the former province of Soule.

== See also ==
- Communes of the Pyrénées-Atlantiques department
