= Laguinge-Restoue =

Laguinge-Restoue Liginaga-Astüe
- Commune
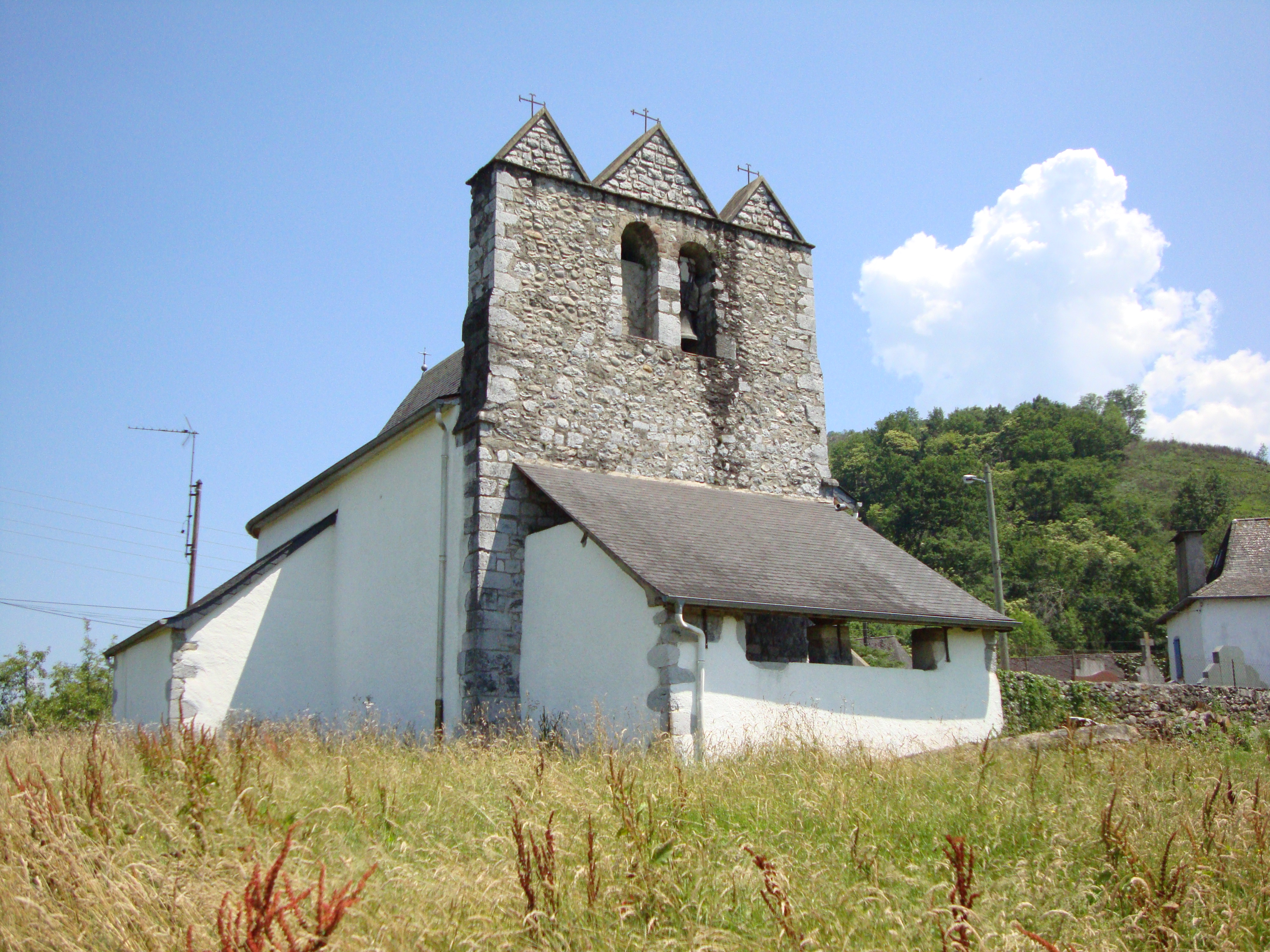
- The church of Restoue
- Location of Laguinge-Restoue
- Location within France Location within Nouvelle-Aquitaine
- Coordinates: 43°05′39″N 0°51′52″W
- Country: France
- Region: Nouvelle-Aquitaine
- Department: Pyrénées-Atlantiques
- Arrondissement: Oloron-Sainte-Marie
- Canton: Montagne Basque
- Intercommunality: CA Pays Basque

Government
  - Mayor (2020–2026): Ruben Gomez
- Area^{1}: 6.00 km^{2} (2.32 sq mi)
- Elevation: 486 m (1,594 ft)
- Highest elevation: 768 m (2,520 ft)
- Lowest elevation: 224 m (735 ft)
- Population (2023): 155
  - Density: 25.8/km^{2} (66.9/sq mi)
- Time zone: UTC+01:00 (CET)
  - Summer (DST): UTC+02:00 (CEST)
- INSEE/Postal code: 64303 /64470
- ^{1} French Land Register data, which excludes lakes, ponds, glaciers > 1 km^{2} (0.386 sq mi or 247 acres) and river estuaries.

Laguinge-Restoue (French pronunciation: [laɡɛ̃ʒ ʁɛstu]; Occitan: Restòu; Basque: Liginaga-Astüe) is a commune in the Pyrénées-Atlantiques department in south-western France.

It is located in the historical province of Soule.

== See also ==
- Communes of the Pyrénées-Atlantiques department
