= Lacarry-Arhan-Charritte-de-Haut =

Lacarry-Arhan-Charritte-de-Haut Lakarri-Arhane-Sarrikotagaine
- Commune
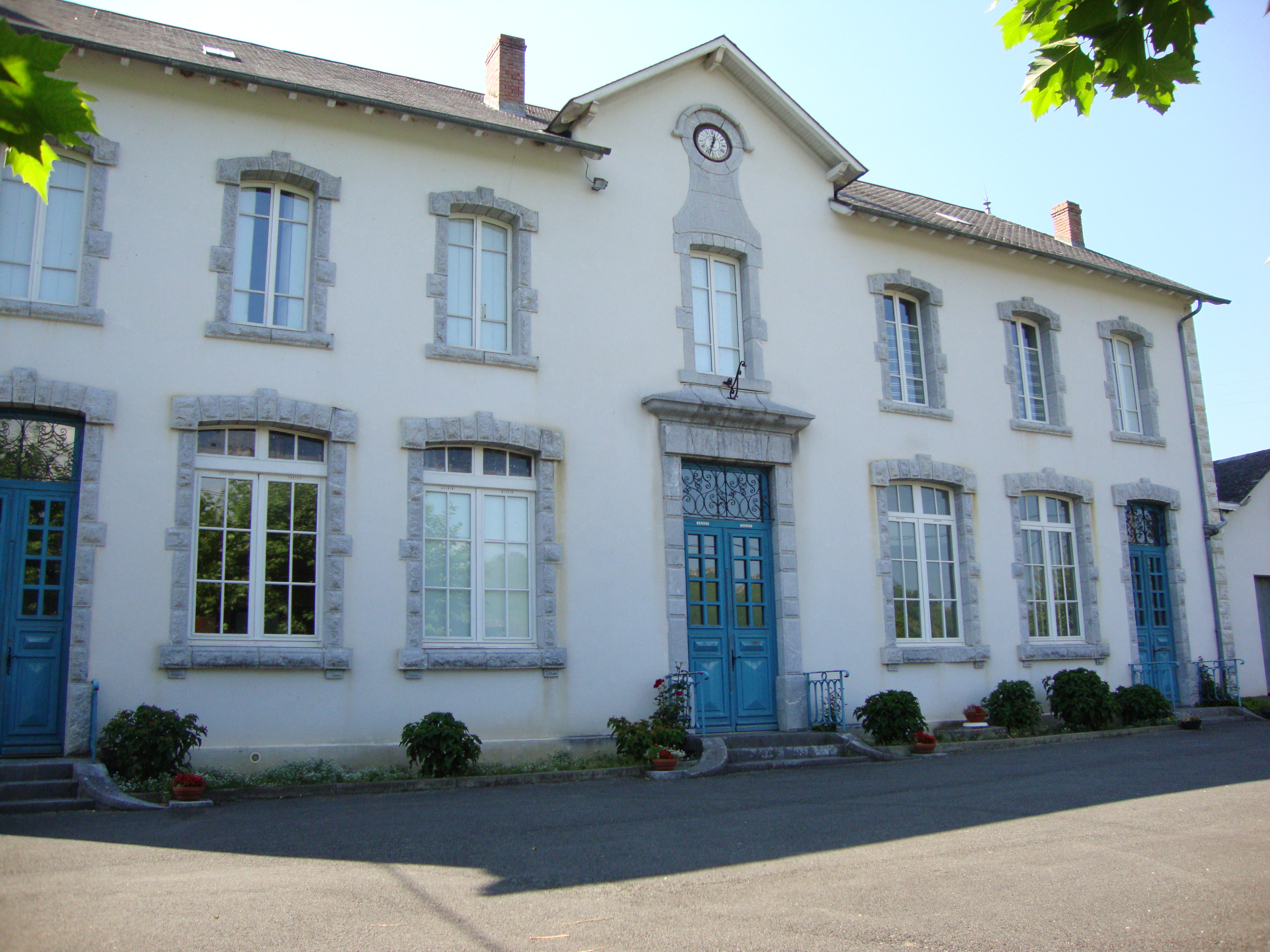
- The town hall of Lacarry-Arhan-Charitte-de-Haut
- Location of Lacarry-Arhan-Charritte-de-Haut
- Location within France Location within Nouvelle-Aquitaine
- Coordinates: 43°05′10″N 0°55′24″W
- Country: France
- Region: Nouvelle-Aquitaine
- Department: Pyrénées-Atlantiques
- Arrondissement: Oloron-Sainte-Marie
- Canton: Montagne Basque
- Intercommunality: CA Pays Basque

Government
  - Mayor (2020–2026): Dorothée Nabarra
- Area^{1}: 23.32 km^{2} (9.00 sq mi)
- Elevation: 358 m (1,175 ft)
- Highest elevation: 1,464 m (4,803 ft)
- Lowest elevation: 240 m (790 ft)
- Population (2023): 109
  - Density: 4.67/km^{2} (12.1/sq mi)
- Time zone: UTC+01:00 (CET)
  - Summer (DST): UTC+02:00 (CEST)
- INSEE/Postal code: 64298 /64470
- ^{1} French Land Register data, which excludes lakes, ponds, glaciers > 1 km^{2} (0.386 sq mi or 247 acres) and river estuaries.

Lacarry-Arhan-Charritte-de-Haut (French pronunciation: [lakaʁi aʁɑ̃ ʃaʁit də o]; Occitan: Carrièra-de-Naut; Basque: Lakarri-Arhane-Sarrikotagaine) is a commune in the Pyrénées-Atlantiques department in south-western France.

It is located in the former province of Soule.

== See also ==
- Communes of the Pyrénées-Atlantiques department
