= Etchebar =

Etchebar Etxebarre
- Commune
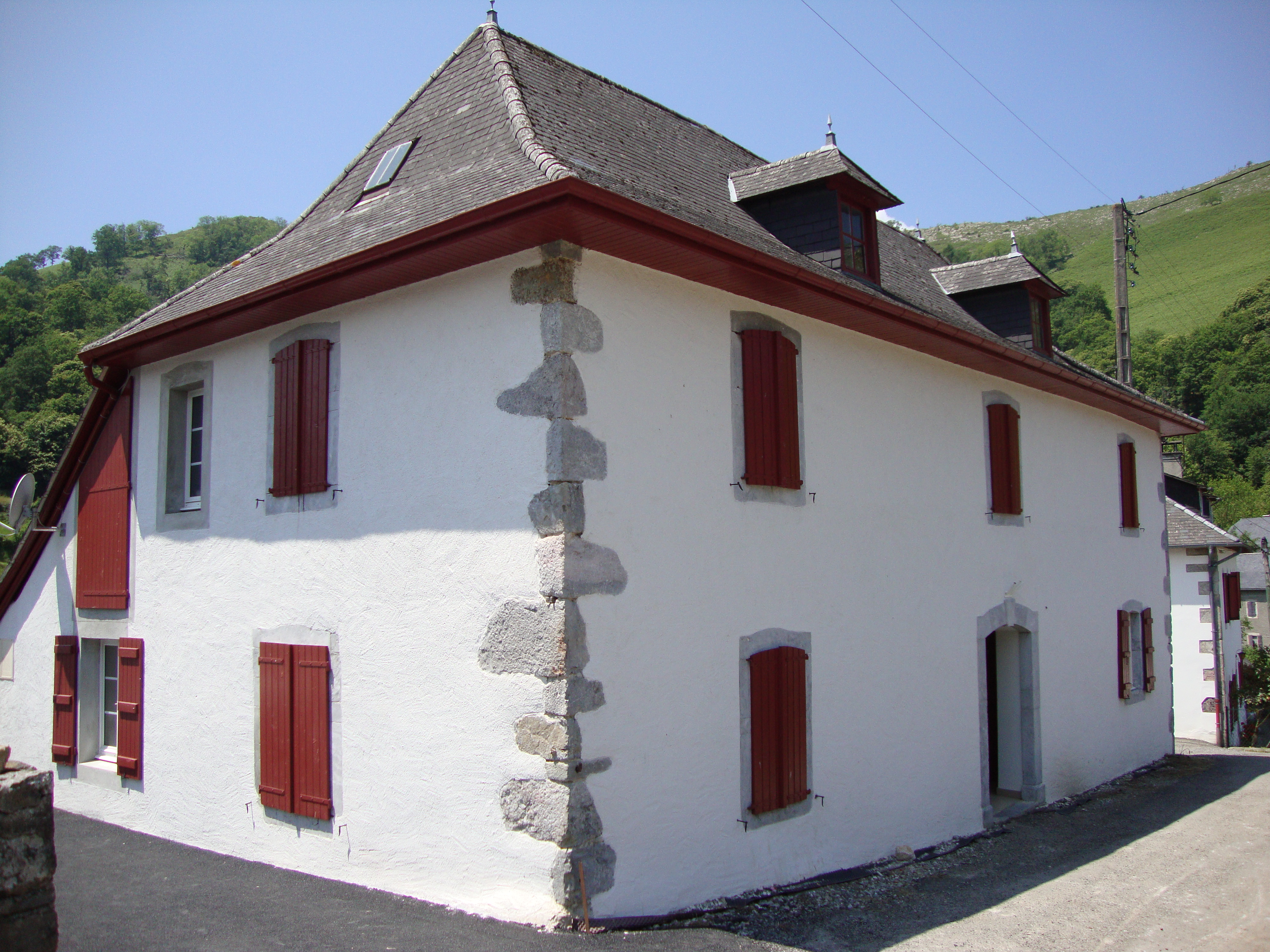
- The town hall of Etchebar
- Location of Etchebar
- Location within France Location within Nouvelle-Aquitaine
- Coordinates: 43°04′59″N 0°53′30″W
- Country: France
- Region: Nouvelle-Aquitaine
- Department: Pyrénées-Atlantiques
- Arrondissement: Oloron-Sainte-Marie
- Canton: Montagne Basque
- Intercommunality: CA Pays Basque

Government
  - Mayor (2020–2026): Claude Recalt
- Area^{1}: 8.23 km^{2} (3.18 sq mi)
- Elevation: 274 m (899 ft)
- Highest elevation: 1,025 m (3,363 ft)
- Lowest elevation: 280 m (920 ft)
- Population (2023): 75
  - Density: 9.1/km^{2} (24/sq mi)
- Time zone: UTC+01:00 (CET)
  - Summer (DST): UTC+02:00 (CEST)
- INSEE/Postal code: 64222 /64470
- ^{1} French Land Register data, which excludes lakes, ponds, glaciers > 1 km^{2} (0.386 sq mi or 247 acres) and river estuaries.

Etchebar (French pronunciation: [etʃebaʁ]; Basque: Etxebarre) is a commune in the Pyrénées-Atlantiques department in south-western France.

It is located in the former province of Soule.

Etchebar served as the place of residence of Nicholai Hel, the main character in Trevanian's novel Shibumi.

== See also ==
- Communes of the Pyrénées-Atlantiques department
