= Menditte =

Menditte Mendikota
- Commune
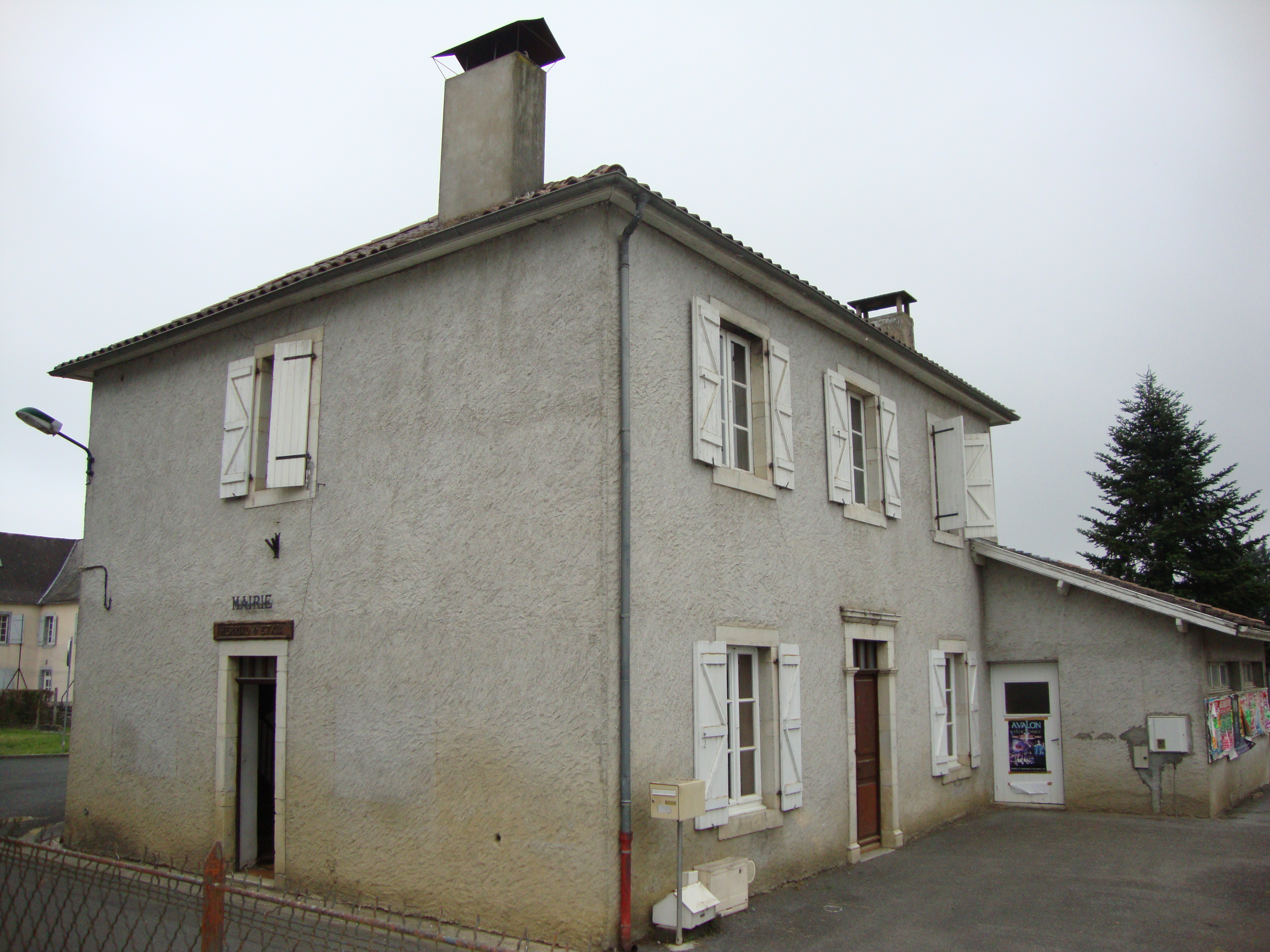
- The town hall of Menditte
- Location of Menditte
- Location within France Location within Nouvelle-Aquitaine
- Coordinates: 43°09′47″N 0°54′02″W
- Country: France
- Region: Nouvelle-Aquitaine
- Department: Pyrénées-Atlantiques
- Arrondissement: Oloron-Sainte-Marie
- Canton: Montagne Basque
- Intercommunality: CA Pays Basque

Government
  - Mayor (2020–2026): Cyril Arhie
- Area^{1}: 6.33 km^{2} (2.44 sq mi)
- Elevation: 251 m (823 ft)
- Highest elevation: 575 m (1,886 ft)
- Lowest elevation: 176 m (577 ft)
- Population (2023): 208
  - Density: 32.9/km^{2} (85.1/sq mi)
- Time zone: UTC+01:00 (CET)
  - Summer (DST): UTC+02:00 (CEST)
- INSEE/Postal code: 64378 /64130
- ^{1} French Land Register data, which excludes lakes, ponds, glaciers > 1 km^{2} (0.386 sq mi or 247 acres) and river estuaries.

Menditte (French pronunciation: [mɛ̃dit]; Basque: Mendikota; Occitan: Cercar de mendicar) is a commune in the Pyrénées-Atlantiques department in south-western France.

It is located in the historical province of Soule.

== See also ==
- Communes of the Pyrénées-Atlantiques department
