= Garindein =

Garindein Garindaine
- Commune
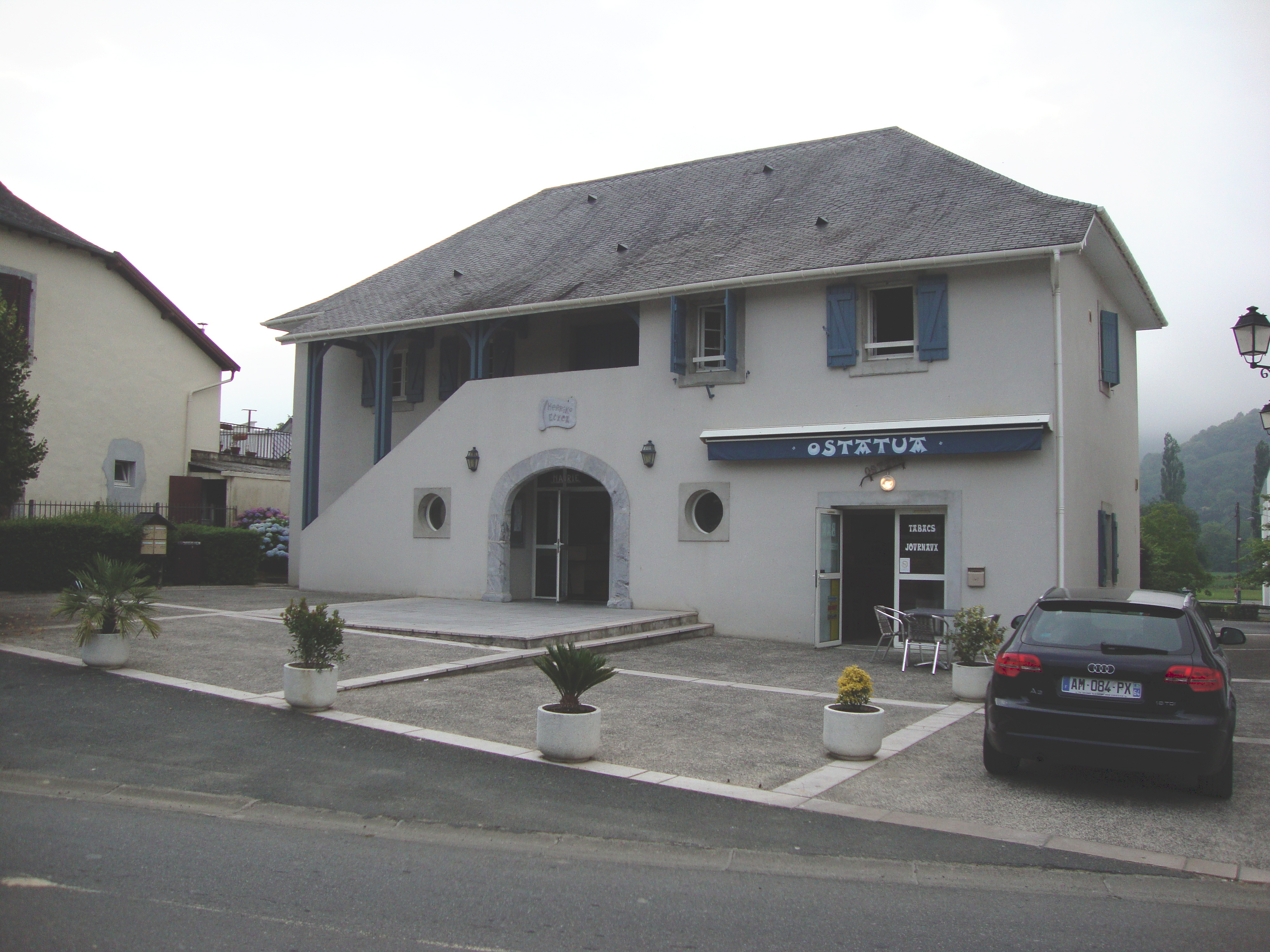
- The town hall of Garindein
- Location of Garindein
- Location within France Location within Nouvelle-Aquitaine
- Coordinates: 43°12′33″N 0°54′16″W
- Country: France
- Region: Nouvelle-Aquitaine
- Department: Pyrénées-Atlantiques
- Arrondissement: Oloron-Sainte-Marie
- Canton: Montagne Basque
- Intercommunality: CA Pays Basque

Government
  - Mayor (2020–2026): Alain Arla
- Area^{1}: 6.87 km^{2} (2.65 sq mi)
- Elevation: 145 m (476 ft)
- Highest elevation: 480 m (1,570 ft)
- Lowest elevation: 137 m (449 ft)
- Population (2023): 457
  - Density: 66.5/km^{2} (172/sq mi)
- Time zone: UTC+01:00 (CET)
  - Summer (DST): UTC+02:00 (CEST)
- INSEE/Postal code: 64231 /64130
- ^{1} French Land Register data, which excludes lakes, ponds, glaciers > 1 km^{2} (0.386 sq mi or 247 acres) and river estuaries.

Garindein (French pronunciation: [ɡaʁɛ̃dɛ̃]; Occitan: Garindaine Basque: Garindaine) is a commune in the Pyrénées-Atlantiques department in south-western France.

It is located in the former province of Soule.

== See also ==
- Communes of the Pyrénées-Atlantiques department
