= Idaux-Mendy =

Idaux-Mendy Idauze-Mendi
- Commune
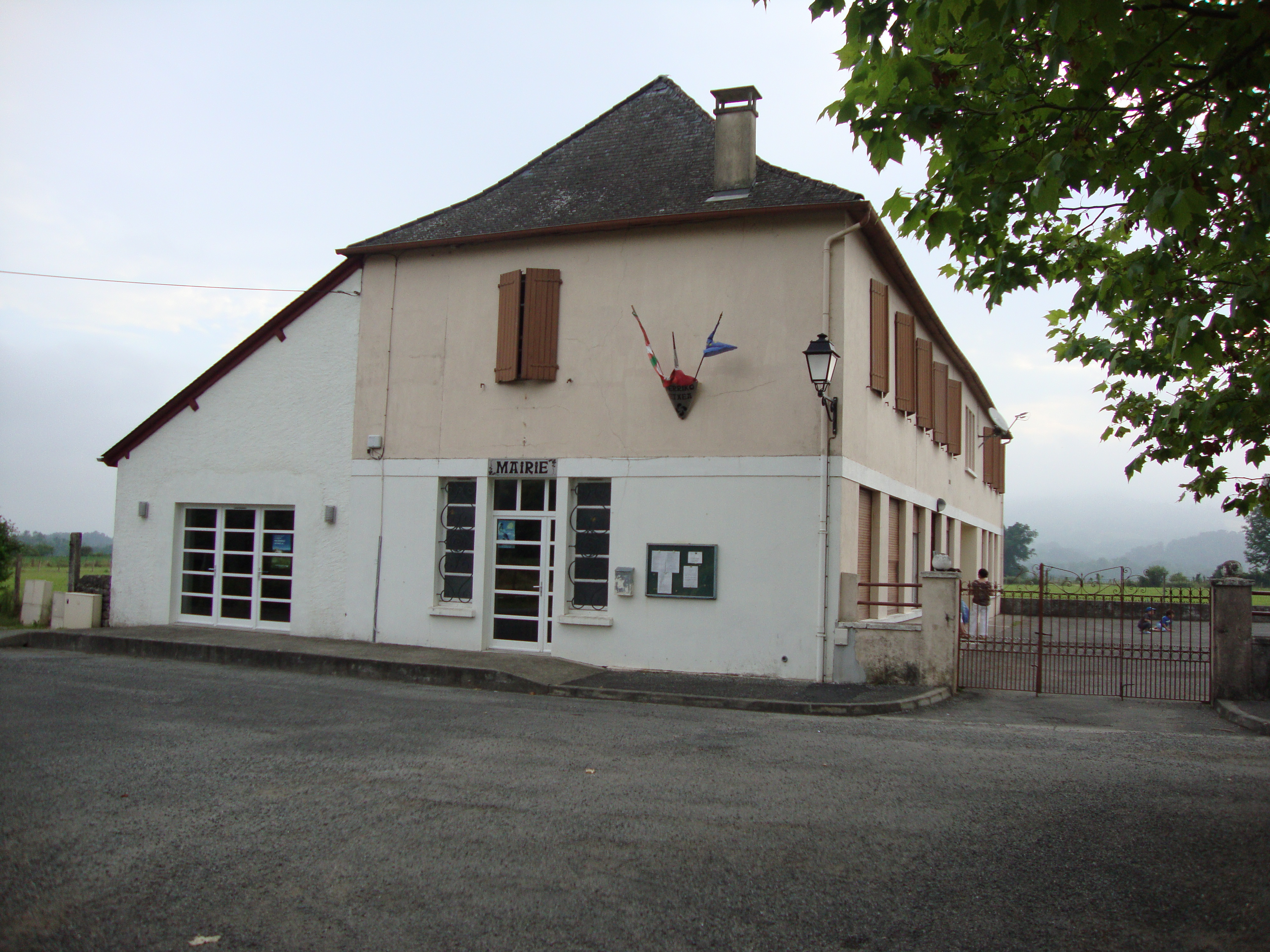
- The town hall and school of Idaux-Mendy
- Location of Idaux-Mendy
- Location within France Location within Nouvelle-Aquitaine
- Coordinates: 43°10′55″N 0°54′52″W
- Country: France
- Region: Nouvelle-Aquitaine
- Department: Pyrénées-Atlantiques
- Arrondissement: Oloron-Sainte-Marie
- Canton: Montagne Basque
- Intercommunality: Pays Basque

Government
  - Mayor (2020–2026): Renée Carrique
- Area^{1}: 9.67 km^{2} (3.73 sq mi)
- Elevation: 173 m (568 ft)
- Highest elevation: 331 m (1,086 ft)
- Lowest elevation: 152 m (499 ft)
- Population (2023): 267
  - Density: 27.6/km^{2} (71.5/sq mi)
- Time zone: UTC+01:00 (CET)
  - Summer (DST): UTC+02:00 (CEST)
- INSEE/Postal code: 64268 /64130
- ^{1} French Land Register data, which excludes lakes, ponds, glaciers > 1 km^{2} (0.386 sq mi or 247 acres) and river estuaries.

Idaux-Mendy (Occitan: Idaus-Mendi; Basque: Idauze-Mendi) is a commune in the Pyrénées-Atlantiques department in south-western France.

It is located in the former province of Soule.

== Population ==
Historical population
Year	Pop.	±% p.a.
1968	229	—
1975	237	+0.49%
1982	227	−0.61%
1990	242	+0.80%
1999	262	+0.89%
2007	260	−0.10%
2012	262	+0.15%
2017	270	+0.60%
2023	267	−0.19%
Source: INSEE

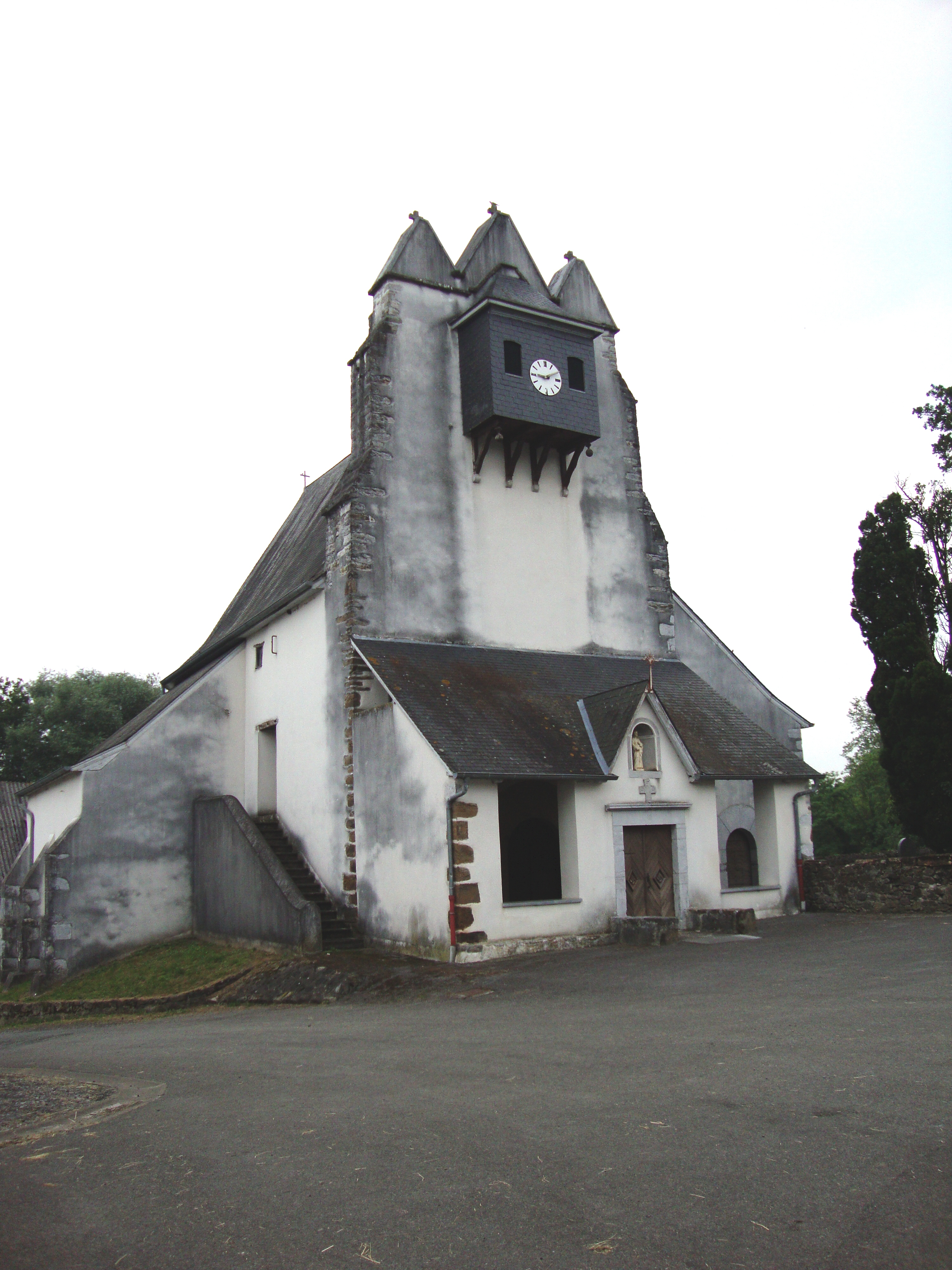
Trinitarian church of Idaux / Idauze.

== See also ==
- Communes of the Pyrénées-Atlantiques department
