= Moncayolle-Larrory-Mendibieu =

Moncayolle-Larrory-Mendibieu Mikitile-Larrori-Mendibile
- Commune
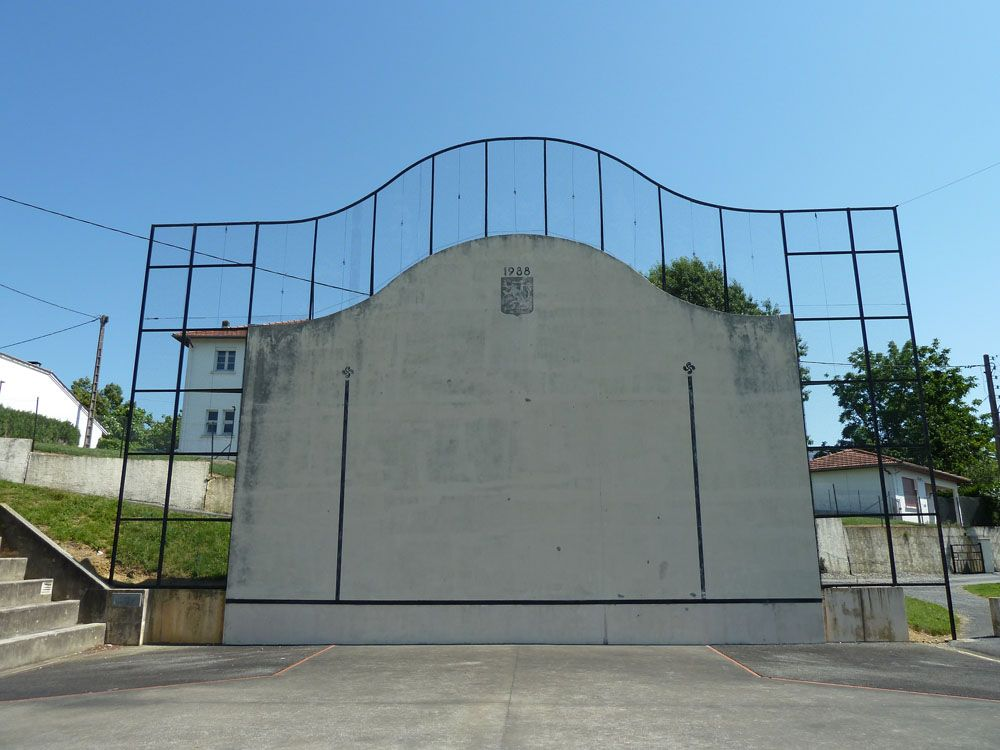
- Pelota court
- Location of Moncayolle-Larrory-Mendibieu
- Location within France Location within Nouvelle-Aquitaine
- Coordinates: 43°16′39″N 0°50′49″W
- Country: France
- Region: Nouvelle-Aquitaine
- Department: Pyrénées-Atlantiques
- Arrondissement: Oloron-Sainte-Marie
- Canton: Montagne Basque
- Intercommunality: CA Pays Basque

Government
  - Mayor (2020–2026): Jean-Michel Prat
- Area^{1}: 16.27 km^{2} (6.28 sq mi)
- Elevation: 260 m (850 ft)
- Highest elevation: 363 m (1,191 ft)
- Lowest elevation: 171 m (561 ft)
- Population (2023): 284
  - Density: 17.5/km^{2} (45.2/sq mi)
- Time zone: UTC+01:00 (CET)
  - Summer (DST): UTC+02:00 (CEST)
- INSEE/Postal code: 64391 /64130
- ^{1} French Land Register data, which excludes lakes, ponds, glaciers > 1 km^{2} (0.386 sq mi or 247 acres) and river estuaries.

Moncayolle-Larrory-Mendibieu (French pronunciation: [mɔ̃kajɔl laʁɔʁi mɛ̃dibjø]; Basque: Mitikile-Larrori-Mendibile) is a commune in the Pyrénées-Atlantiques department in south-western France.

It is located in the historical province of Soule. Moncayolle is famous for its ornate Comtoise clocks.

== See also ==
- Communes of the Pyrénées-Atlantiques department
