= Lecumberry =

Lecumberry Lekunberri
- Commune
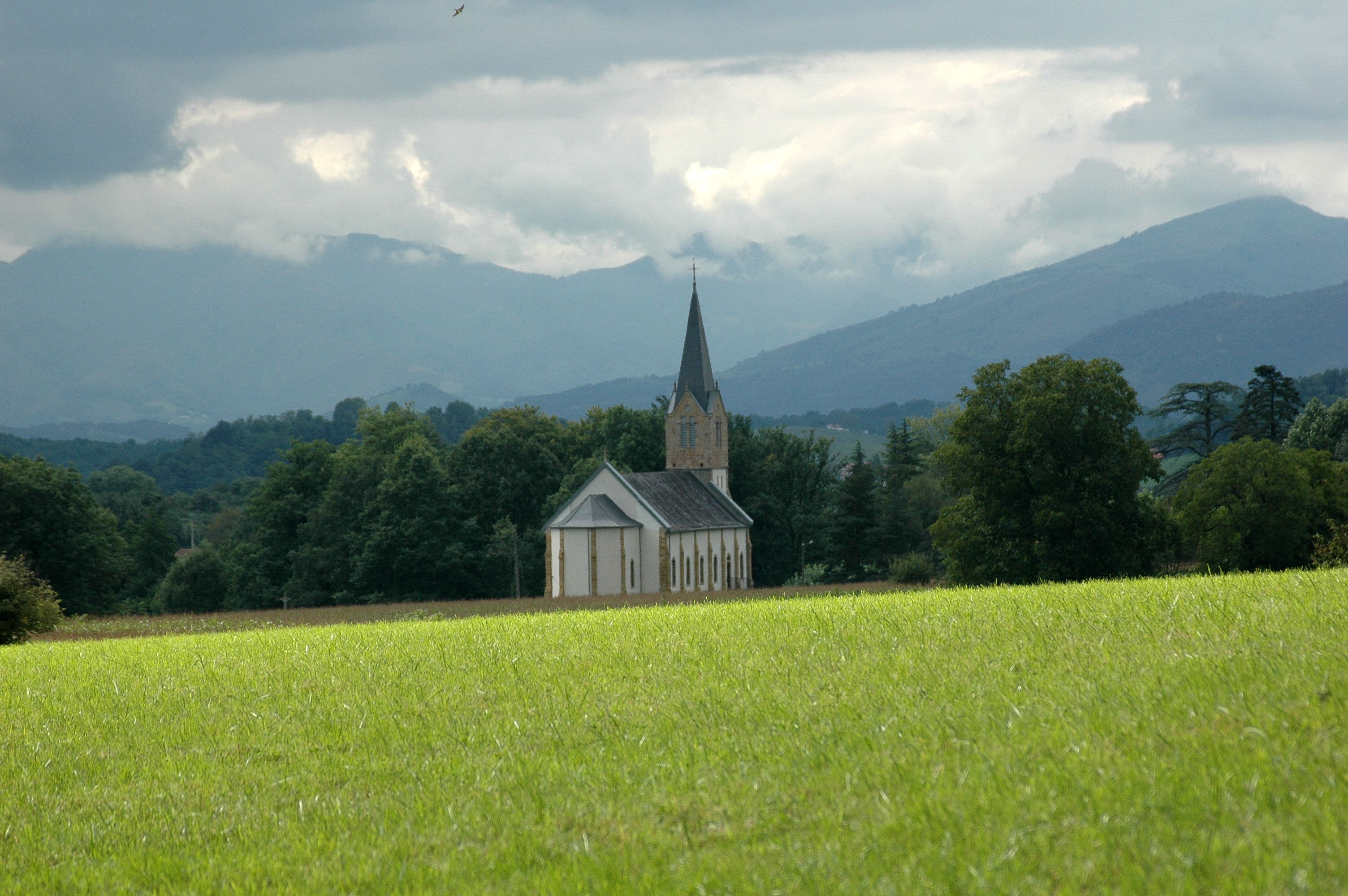
- The church of Lecumberry

- Coat of arms
- Location of Lecumberry
- Location within France Location within Nouvelle-Aquitaine
- Coordinates: 43°08′10″N 1°08′31″W
- Country: France
- Region: Nouvelle-Aquitaine
- Department: Pyrénées-Atlantiques
- Arrondissement: Bayonne
- Canton: Montagne Basque
- Intercommunality: CA Pays Basque

Government
  - Mayor (2020–2026): Joseph Goyheneix
- Area^{1}: 58.09 km^{2} (22.43 sq mi)
- Elevation: 565 m (1,854 ft)
- Highest elevation: 1,468 m (4,816 ft)
- Lowest elevation: 247 m (810 ft)
- Population (2023): 196
  - Density: 3.37/km^{2} (8.74/sq mi)
- Time zone: UTC+01:00 (CET)
  - Summer (DST): UTC+02:00 (CEST)
- INSEE/Postal code: 64327 /64220
- ^{1} French Land Register data, which excludes lakes, ponds, glaciers > 1 km^{2} (0.386 sq mi or 247 acres) and river estuaries.

Lecumberry (French pronunciation: [lekumbeʁi]; Occitan: Lecumberri; Basque: Lekunberri) is a commune in the Pyrénées-Atlantiques department in south-western France.

It is located in the former province of Lower Navarre.

== See also ==
- Communes of the Pyrénées-Atlantiques department
