= Aphanize =

Aphanize is a Basque place name. It is found in:

- the Aphanize Pass, a mountain pass between the valleys of the Bidouze and the Laurhibar in Lower Navarre
- l'Aphanize, a right tributary of the Saison upstream from Tardets
- l'Aphanixe, a right tributary of the Saison from Haux, Pyrénées-Atlantiques
