= Domezain-Berraute =

Domezain-Berraute Domintxaine-Berroeta
- Commune
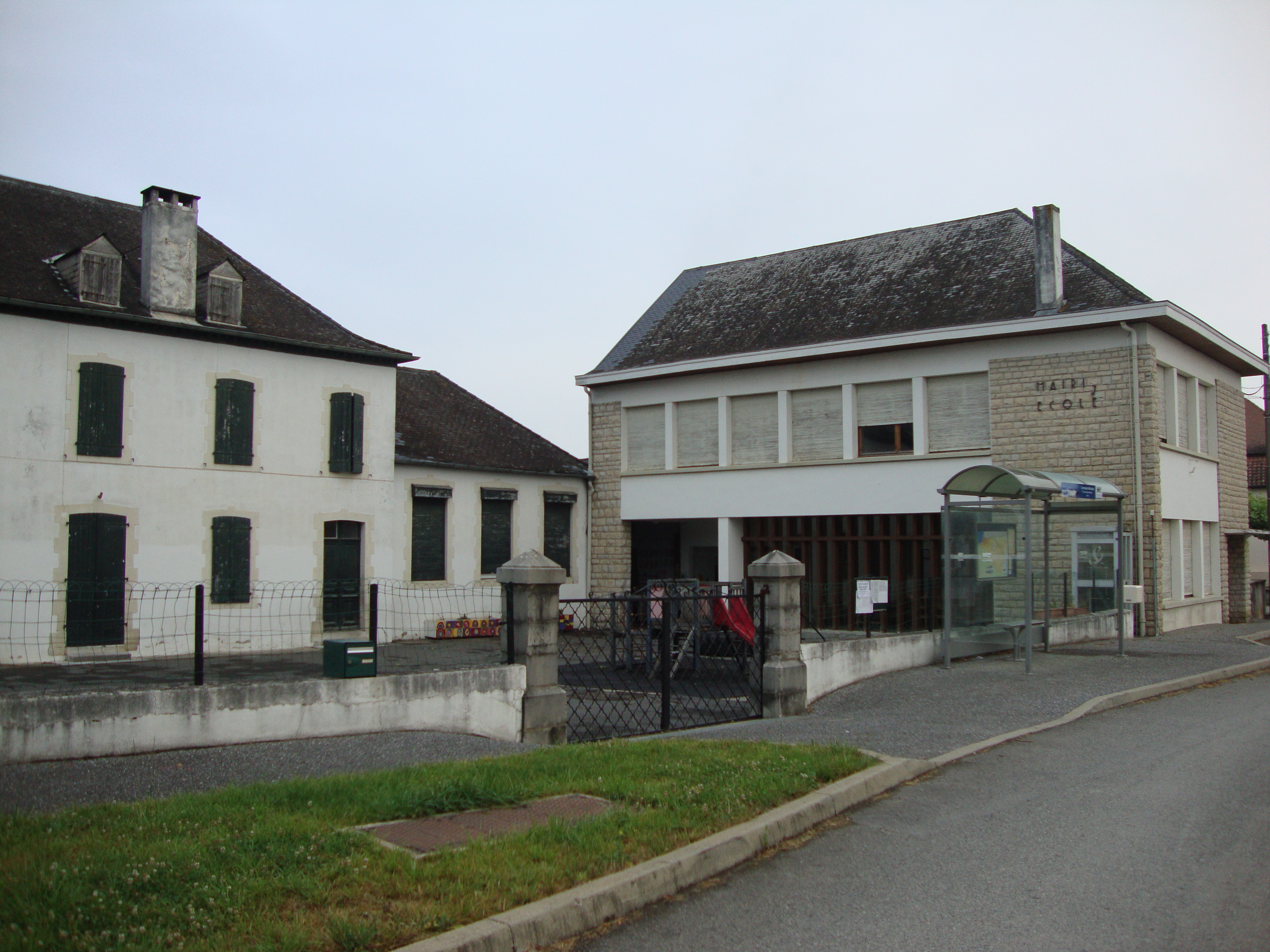
- The town hall and school of Domezain-Berraute

- Coat of arms
- Location of Domezain-Berraute
- Location within France Location within Nouvelle-Aquitaine
- Coordinates: 43°19′41″N 0°57′50″W
- Country: France
- Region: Nouvelle-Aquitaine
- Department: Pyrénées-Atlantiques
- Arrondissement: Bayonne
- Canton: Pays de Bidache, Amikuze et Ostibarre
- Intercommunality: CA Pays Basque

Government
  - Mayor (2020–2026): Sauveur Urrutiaguer
- Area^{1}: 21.56 km^{2} (8.32 sq mi)
- Elevation: 102 m (335 ft)
- Highest elevation: 212 m (696 ft)
- Lowest elevation: 54 m (177 ft)
- Population (2023): 473
  - Density: 21.9/km^{2} (56.8/sq mi)
- Time zone: UTC+01:00 (CET)
  - Summer (DST): UTC+02:00 (CEST)
- INSEE/Postal code: 64202 /64120
- ^{1} French Land Register data, which excludes lakes, ponds, glaciers > 1 km^{2} (0.386 sq mi or 247 acres) and river estuaries.

Domezain-Berraute (French pronunciation: [dɔm(ə)zɛ̃ beʁot]; Basque: Domintxaine-Berroeta) is a commune in the Pyrénées-Atlantiques department in south-western France.

Domezain-Berraute is located in the former province of Soule.

== See also ==
- Communes of the Pyrénées-Atlantiques department
