= Montory =

Montory Montori
- Commune
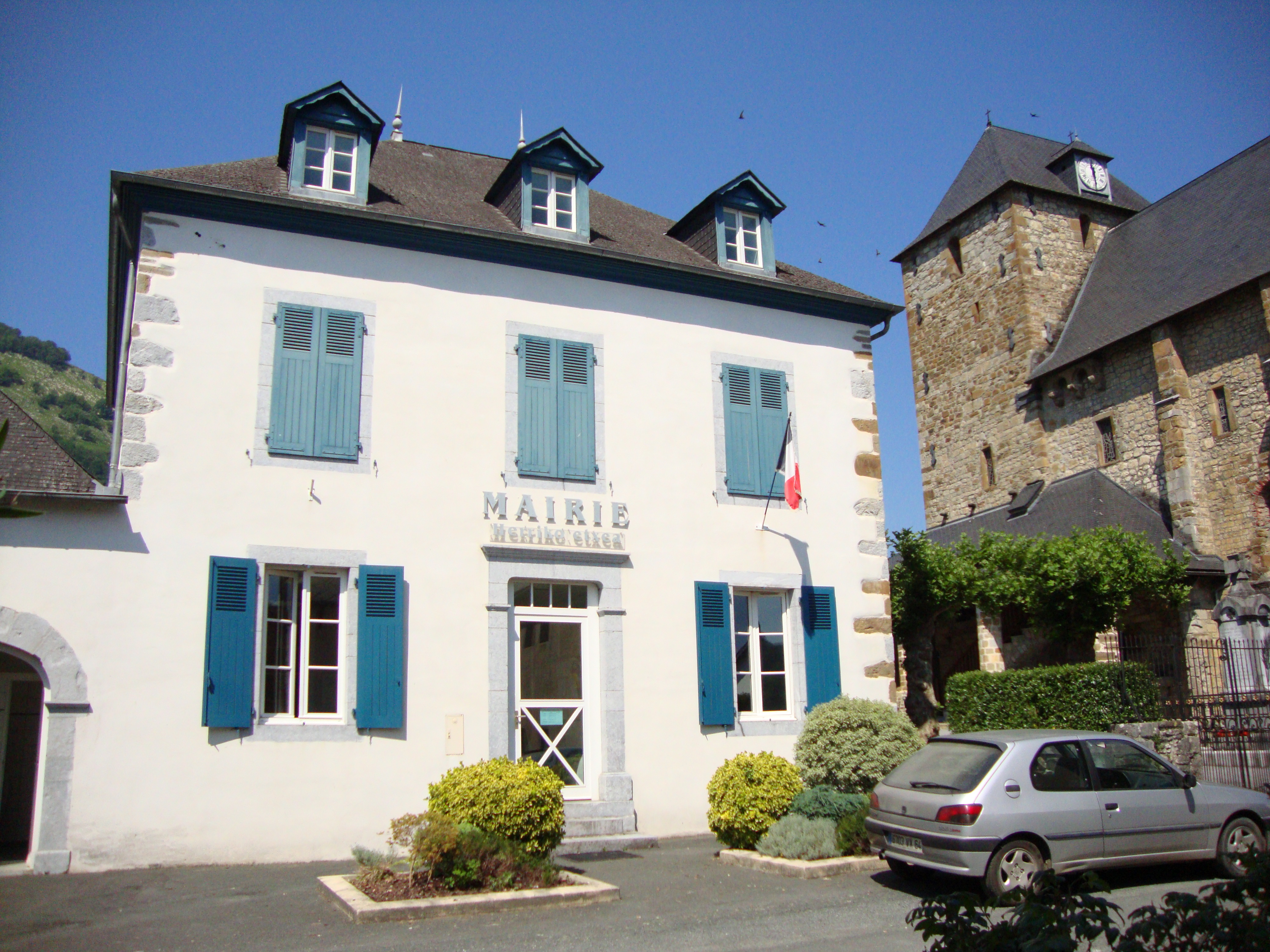
- The town hall of Montory
- Location of Montory
- Location within France Location within Nouvelle-Aquitaine
- Coordinates: 43°05′52″N 0°49′01″W
- Country: France
- Region: Nouvelle-Aquitaine
- Department: Pyrénées-Atlantiques
- Arrondissement: Oloron-Sainte-Marie
- Canton: Montagne Basque
- Intercommunality: CA Pays Basque

Government
  - Mayor (2020–2026): Jean-Jacques Pontaut
- Area^{1}: 20.45 km^{2} (7.90 sq mi)
- Elevation: 277 m (909 ft)
- Highest elevation: 800 m (2,600 ft)
- Lowest elevation: 239 m (784 ft)
- Population (2023): 318
  - Density: 15.6/km^{2} (40.3/sq mi)
- Time zone: UTC+01:00 (CET)
  - Summer (DST): UTC+02:00 (CEST)
- INSEE/Postal code: 64404 /64470
- ^{1} French Land Register data, which excludes lakes, ponds, glaciers > 1 km^{2} (0.386 sq mi or 247 acres) and river estuaries.

Montory (French pronunciation: [mɔ̃tɔʁi]; Basque: Montori; Occitan: Mondòri) is a commune in the Pyrénées-Atlantiques department in south-western France.

It is located in the historical province of Soule (Basque: Xiberoa).

== See also ==
- Communes of the Pyrénées-Atlantiques department
