= Ordiarp =

Ordiarp Urdiñarbe (Basque)
- Commune
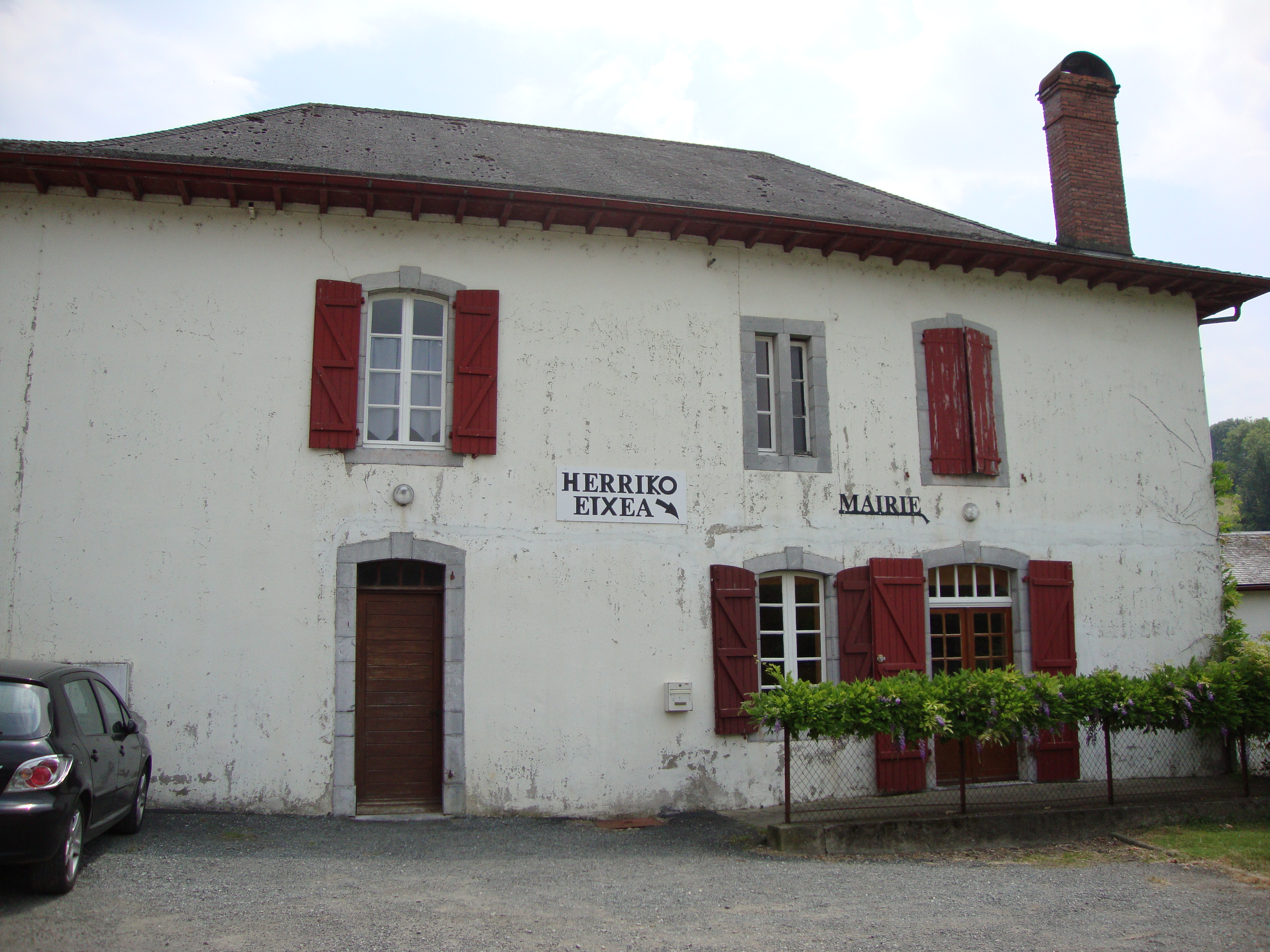
- The town hall of Ordiarp
- Location of Ordiarp
- Location within France Location within Nouvelle-Aquitaine
- Coordinates: 43°11′11″N 0°56′34″W
- Country: France
- Region: Nouvelle-Aquitaine
- Department: Pyrénées-Atlantiques
- Arrondissement: Oloron-Sainte-Marie
- Canton: Montagne Basque
- Intercommunality: CA Pays Basque

Government
  - Mayor (2020–2026): Jean-Michel Arrayet
- Area^{1}: 29.71 km^{2} (11.47 sq mi)
- Elevation: 197 m (646 ft)
- Highest elevation: 1,239 m (4,065 ft)
- Lowest elevation: 131 m (430 ft)
- Population (2023): 547
  - Density: 18.4/km^{2} (47.7/sq mi)
- Time zone: UTC+01:00 (CET)
  - Summer (DST): UTC+02:00 (CEST)
- INSEE/Postal code: 64424 /64130
- ^{1} French Land Register data, which excludes lakes, ponds, glaciers > 1 km^{2} (0.386 sq mi or 247 acres) and river estuaries.

Ordiarp (French pronunciation: [ɔʁdjaʁp]; Basque: Urdiñarbe) is a commune in the Pyrénées-Atlantiques department in south-western France.

It is located in the former province of Soule.

== See also ==
- Communes of the Pyrénées-Atlantiques department
