= Haux, Pyrénées-Atlantiques =

Haux Hauze
- Commune
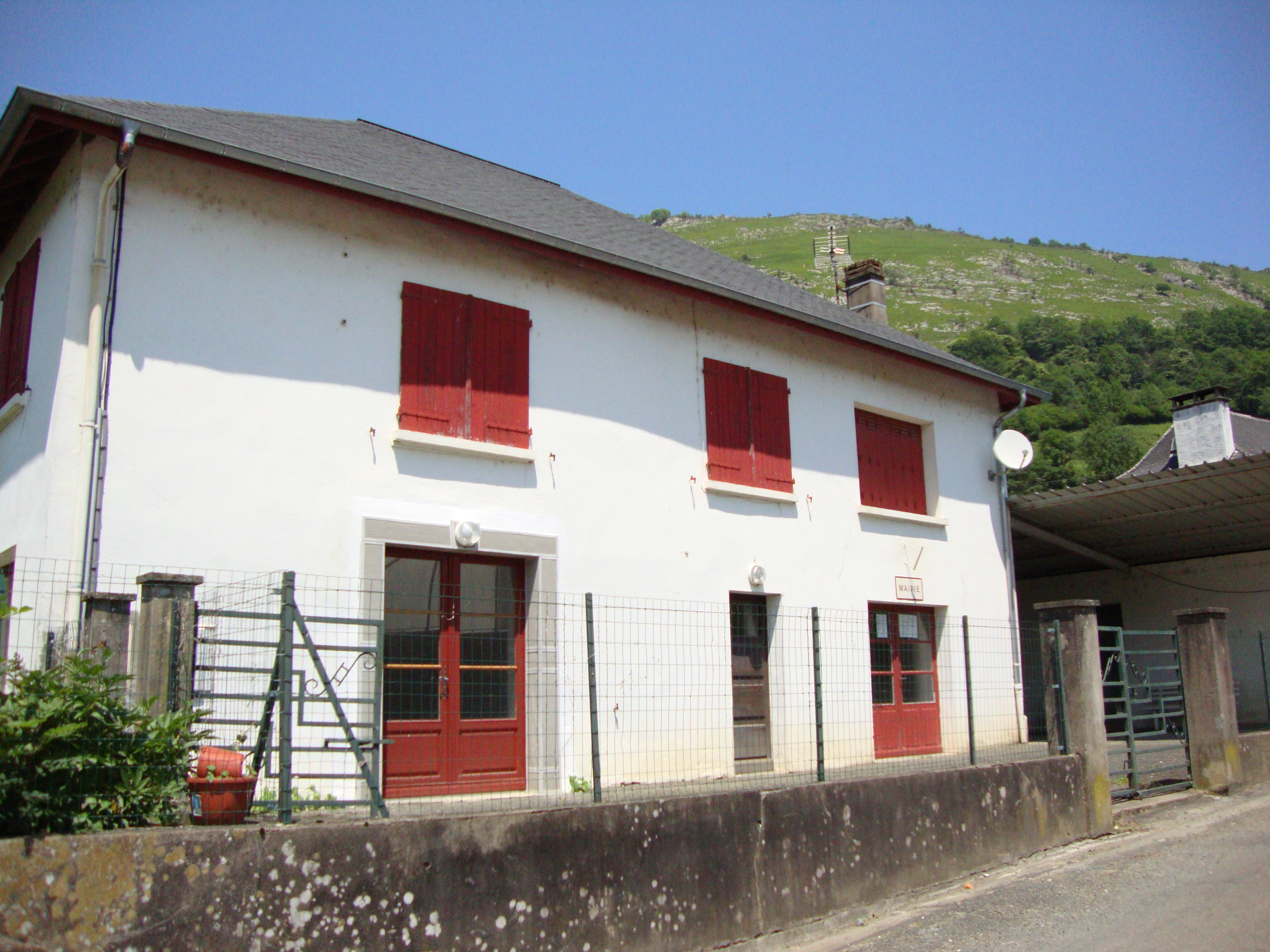
- The town hall of Haux
- Location of Haux
- Location within France Location within Nouvelle-Aquitaine
- Coordinates: 43°04′44″N 0°50′50″W
- Country: France
- Region: Nouvelle-Aquitaine
- Department: Pyrénées-Atlantiques
- Arrondissement: Oloron-Sainte-Marie
- Canton: Montagne Basque
- Intercommunality: CA Pays Basque

Government
  - Mayor (2020–2026): Pierre Carricart
- Area^{1}: 17.01 km^{2} (6.57 sq mi)
- Elevation: 324 m (1,063 ft)
- Highest elevation: 1,385 m (4,544 ft)
- Lowest elevation: 266 m (873 ft)
- Population (2023): 84
  - Density: 4.9/km^{2} (13/sq mi)
- Time zone: UTC+01:00 (CET)
  - Summer (DST): UTC+02:00 (CEST)
- INSEE/Postal code: 64258 /64470
- ^{1} French Land Register data, which excludes lakes, ponds, glaciers > 1 km^{2} (0.386 sq mi or 247 acres) and river estuaries.

Haux (Occitan: Haut; Basque: Hauze) is a commune in the Pyrénées-Atlantiques department in south-western France.

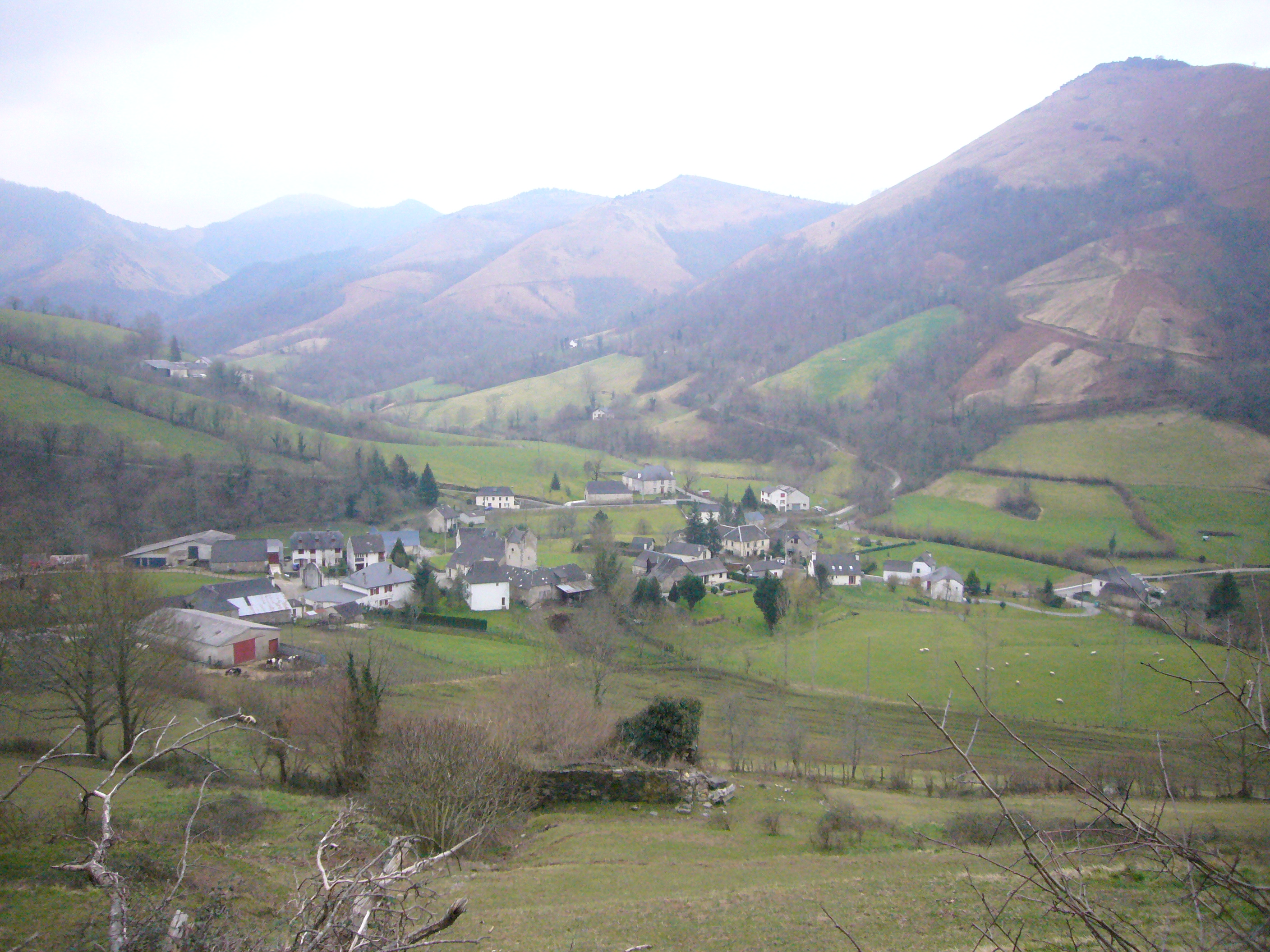
Haux

It is located in the former province of Soule.

== See also ==
- Communes of the Pyrénées-Atlantiques department
