= Trinitarian steeple =

Three-pointed church steeples in France

The church of Gotein-Libarrenx

A trinitarian steeple is a three-point steeple typical of the province of Soule in the Northern Basque Country of France. The three points symbolize the Holy Trinity. They are generally located above flat facades, sometimes called steeple-walls.

Villages with a trinitarian steeple building include:

- Agnos
- Arrast
- Aussurucq
- Berrogain-Laruns
- Charritte-de-Bas
- Espès-Undurein
- Gotein-Libarrenx
- Idaux-Mendy
- Mauléon (Chapel of the College)
- Moncayolle
- Viellenave-de-Navarrenx
- Viodos-Abense-de-Bas
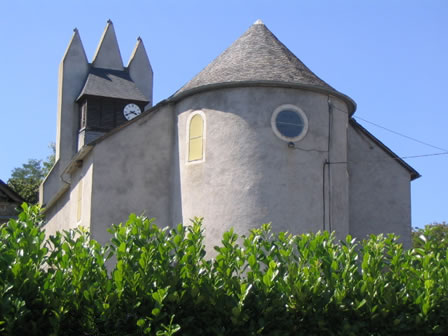
Berrogain-Laruns

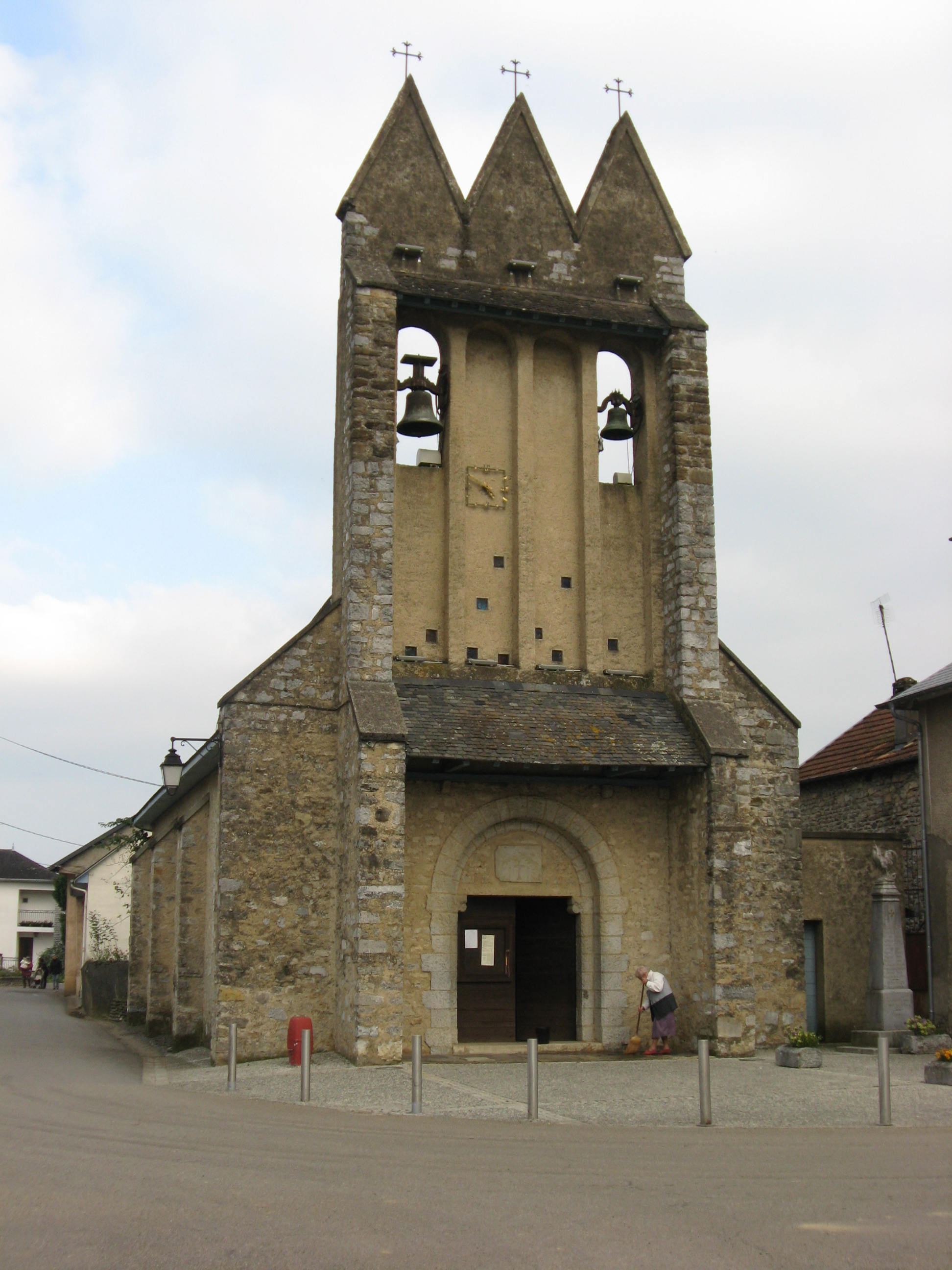
Agnos

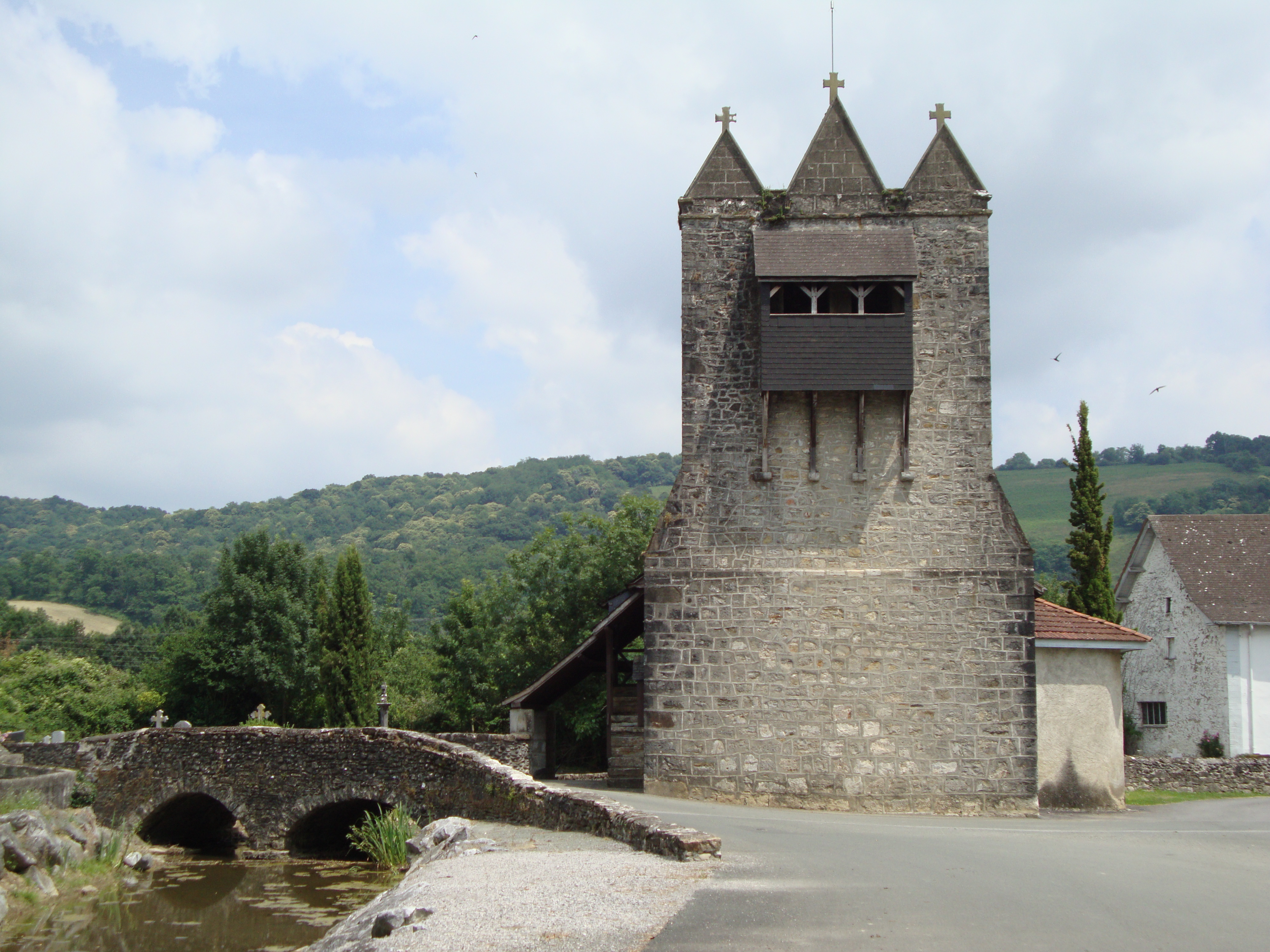
Viodos-Abense-de-Bas

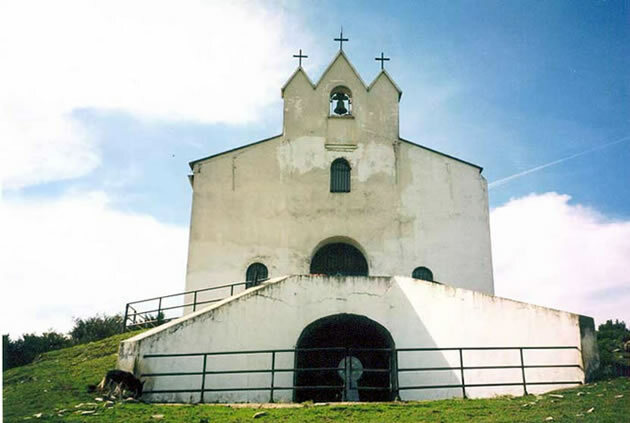
Chapel Saint-Antoine on the col d'Osquich
