= Arrast-Larrebieu =

Arrast-Larrebieu Ürrustoi-Larrebille
- Commune
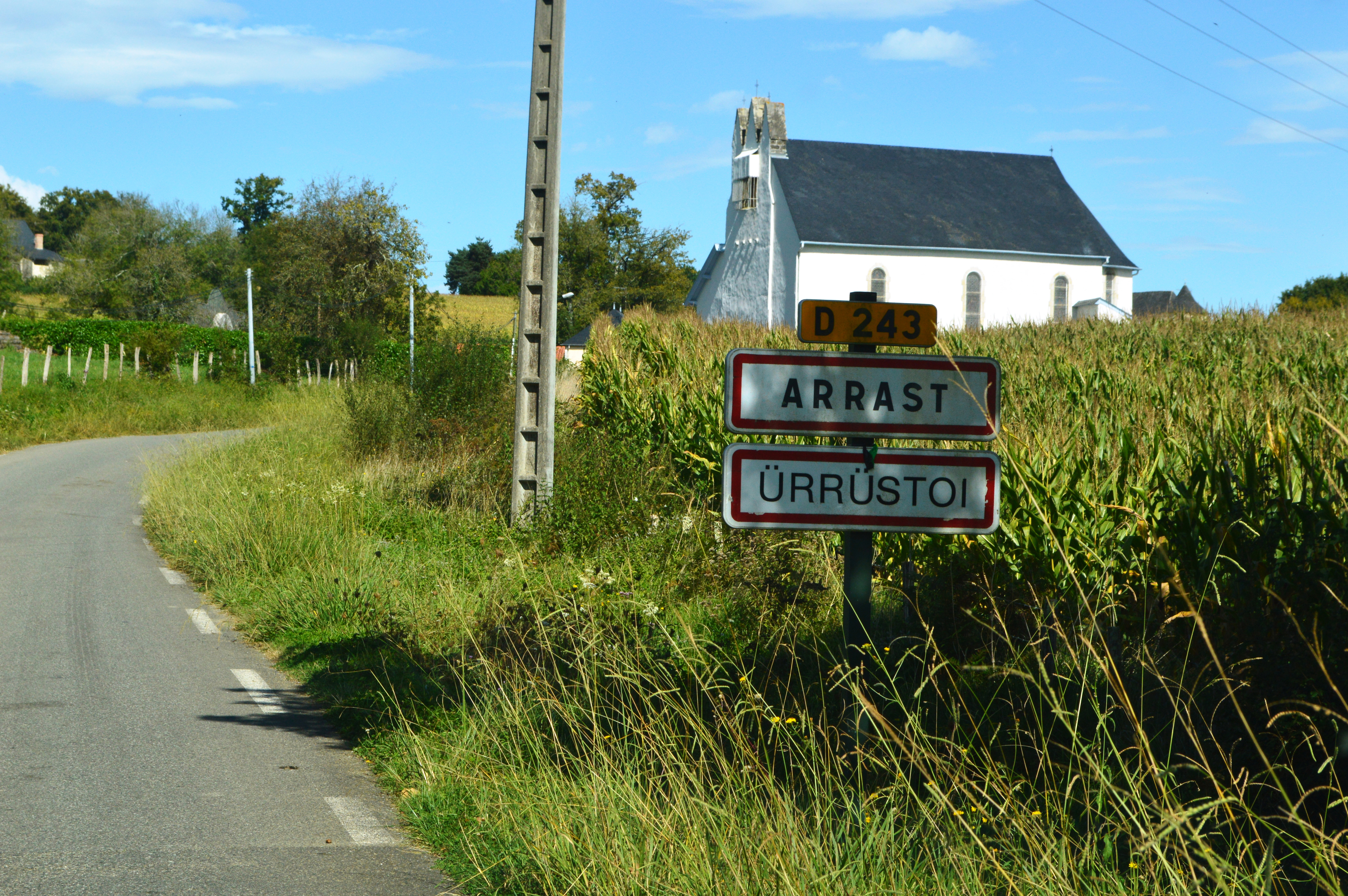
- The road into Arrast
- Location of Arrast-Larrebieu
- Location within France Location within Nouvelle-Aquitaine
- Coordinates: 43°17′39″N 0°50′56″W
- Country: France
- Region: Nouvelle-Aquitaine
- Department: Pyrénées-Atlantiques
- Arrondissement: Oloron-Sainte-Marie
- Canton: Montagne Basque
- Intercommunality: CA Pays Basque

Government
  - Mayor (2020–2026): Allande Davant
- Area^{1}: 7.56 km^{2} (2.92 sq mi)
- Elevation: 173 m (568 ft)
- Highest elevation: 299 m (981 ft)
- Lowest elevation: 132 m (433 ft)
- Population (2023): 96
  - Density: 13/km^{2} (33/sq mi)
- Time zone: UTC+01:00 (CET)
  - Summer (DST): UTC+02:00 (CEST)
- INSEE/Postal code: 64050 /64130
- ^{1} French Land Register data, which excludes lakes, ponds, glaciers > 1 km^{2} (0.386 sq mi or 247 acres) and river estuaries.

Arrast-Larrebieu (French pronunciation: [aʁast laʁbjø]; Occitan: Tralhar; Basque: Ürrustoi-Larrebille) is a commune in the Pyrénées-Atlantiques department in the Nouvelle-Aquitaine region of south-western France.

== Geography ==
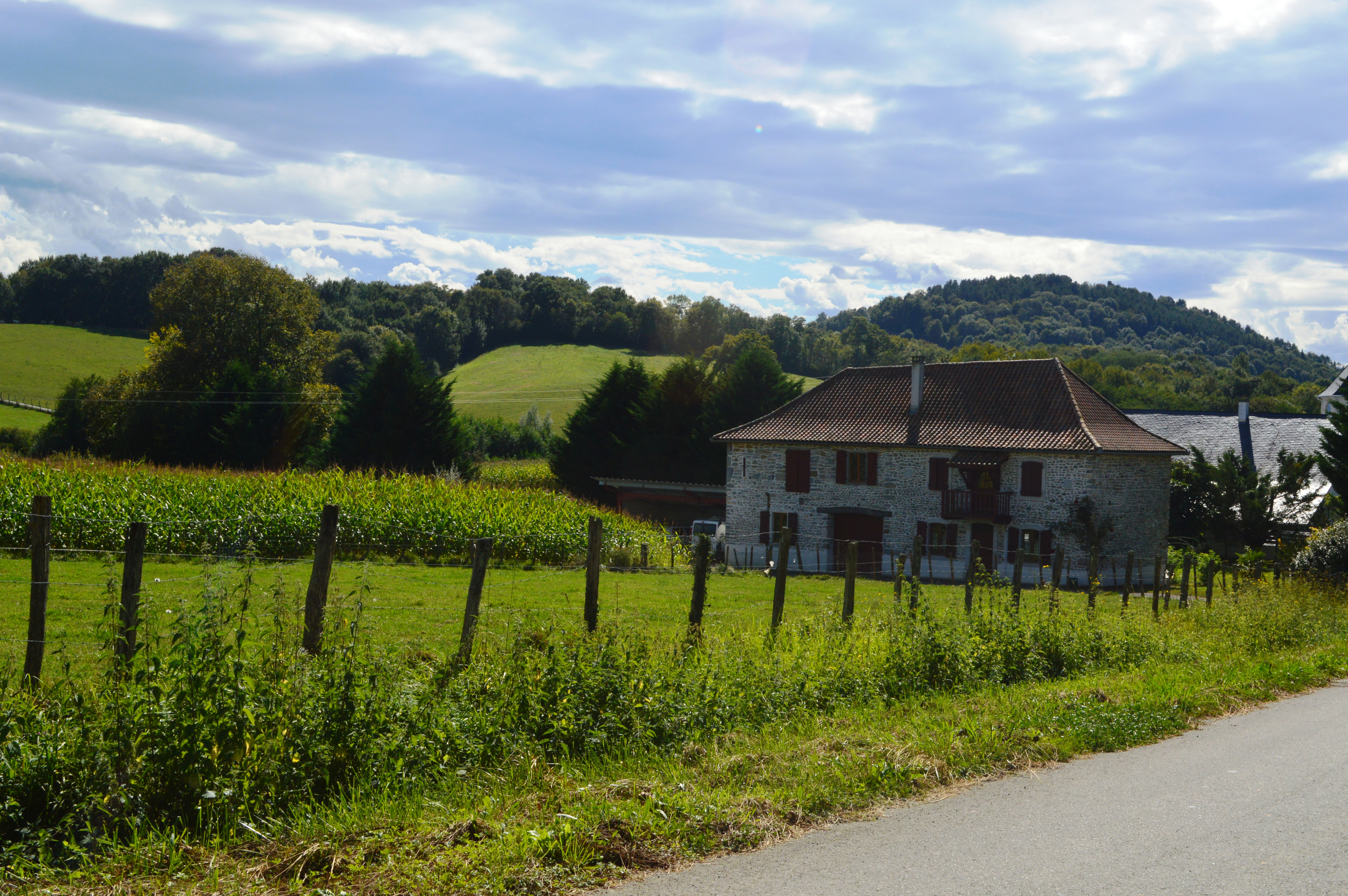
Arrast-Larrebieu General View

Arrast-Larrebieu is located in the former province of Soule some 12 km east by south-east of Saint-Palais and 10 km north by north-east of Mauléon-Licharre. Access to the commune is by the D243 road which branches off the D11 west of the commune and north of Espès-Undurein and passes through the village before continuing north-east to join the D115. The D135 from the D11 in the west to Moncayolle-Larrory-Mendibieu in the south-east passes through the south of the commune and the hamlet of Larrebieu. The commune is mainly farmland with many forests scattered throughout the commune.

The Laxubie rises in the south of the commune and flows north past the village gathering many tributaries and joins the Apaure north of the commune. Several small streams rise in the west of the commune and flow west to join the Saison.

=== Places and Hamlets ===
- Abbadia
- Aguelcheberry
- Aguerria
- Aitzaguer (ruins)
- Algalarrondo
- Arkabisquey
- Arrast
- Asconeguy
- Behety
- Bethulard
- Bou
- Garatia
- Gastelu
- Gastelu Arrast
- Gasteluchague
- Habiague
- Heguilus
- Hoilly
- Ibarbouen
- Lacoste
- Laplume
- Larçabal
- Larlette
- Larrebieu
- Larribet
- Mendiondo
- Oyhenart
- Poutou
- Sabalain
- Sagardoyburu
- Sallaberry
- Sunhary
- Tine

== Toponymy ==
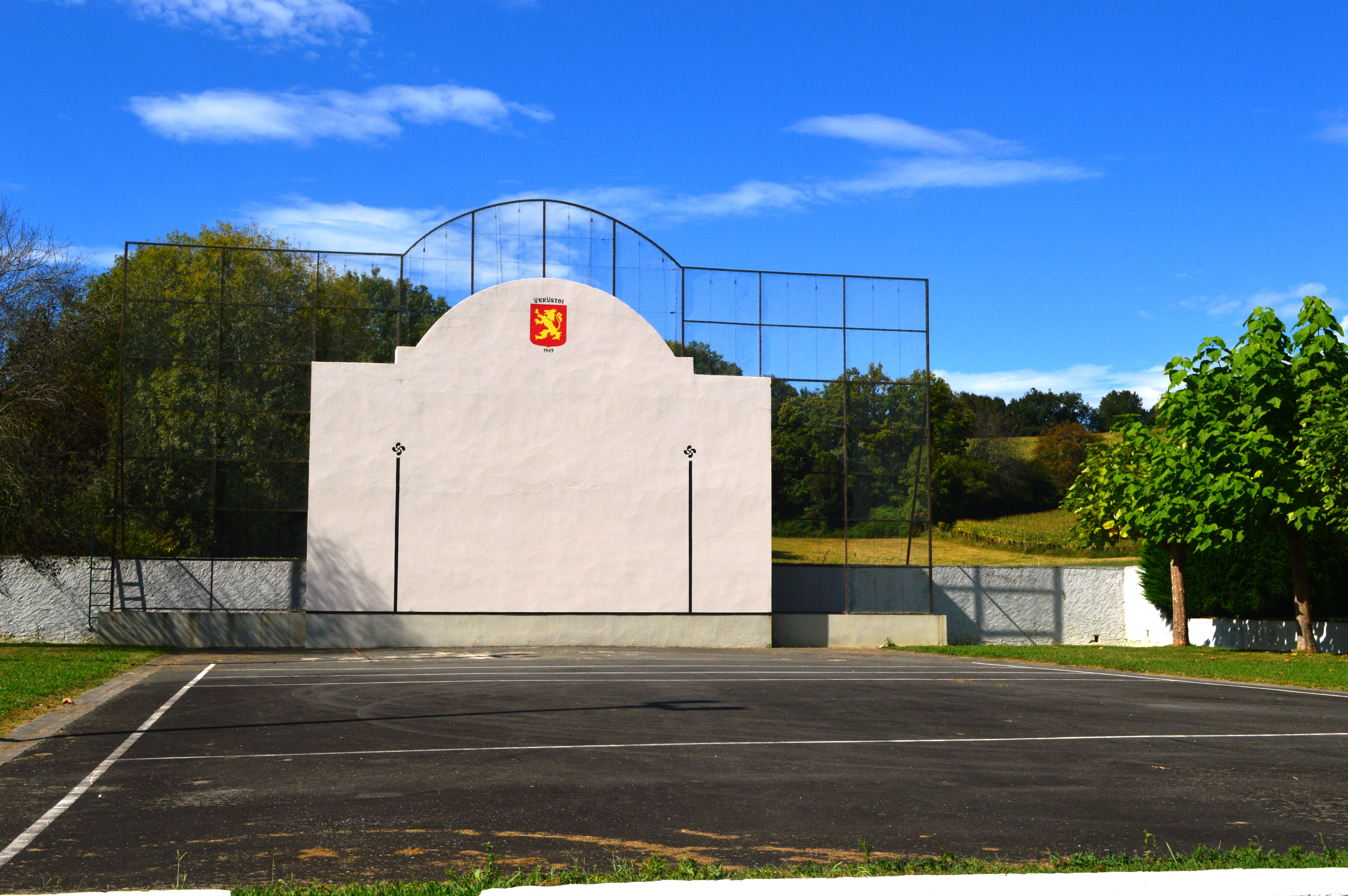
Arrast Fronton

The commune name in basque today is Ürrüstoi-Larrabile or Ürrustoi-Larrebille.

Jean-Baptiste Orpustan indicated that the spelling in Basque Arrast is sometimes given with the determinant Ürrüxtoia meaning "hazel tree grove". He also stated that larrabil means a "rounded moor, squat".

The following table details the origins of the commune name and other names in the commune.

Name	Spelling	Date	Source	Page	Origin	Description
Arrast	Arrast	13th century	Raymond	11	Bayonne	Village
	Arrast	1690	Orpustan			
	Larast	1690	Orpustan			
	Larrast	1690	Orpustan			
Larrebieu	Larrebiu	1384	Raymond	94	Notaries	Village
	Larrebiu	1690	Orpustan			

Sources:

- Raymond: Topographic Dictionary of the Department of Basses-Pyrenees, 1863, on the page numbers indicated in the table. (in French)
- Orpustan: Jean-Baptiste Orpustan, New Basque Toponymy

Origins:

- Bayonne: Cartulary of Bayonne or Livre d'Or (Book of Gold)
- Notaries: Notaries of Navarrenx

== History ==
Paul Raymond noted on page 11 of his 1863 dictionary that the commune had a Lay Abbey, vassal of the Viscounts of Soule.

Larrebieu was merged with the commune of Arrast on 16 October 1842.

== Administration ==
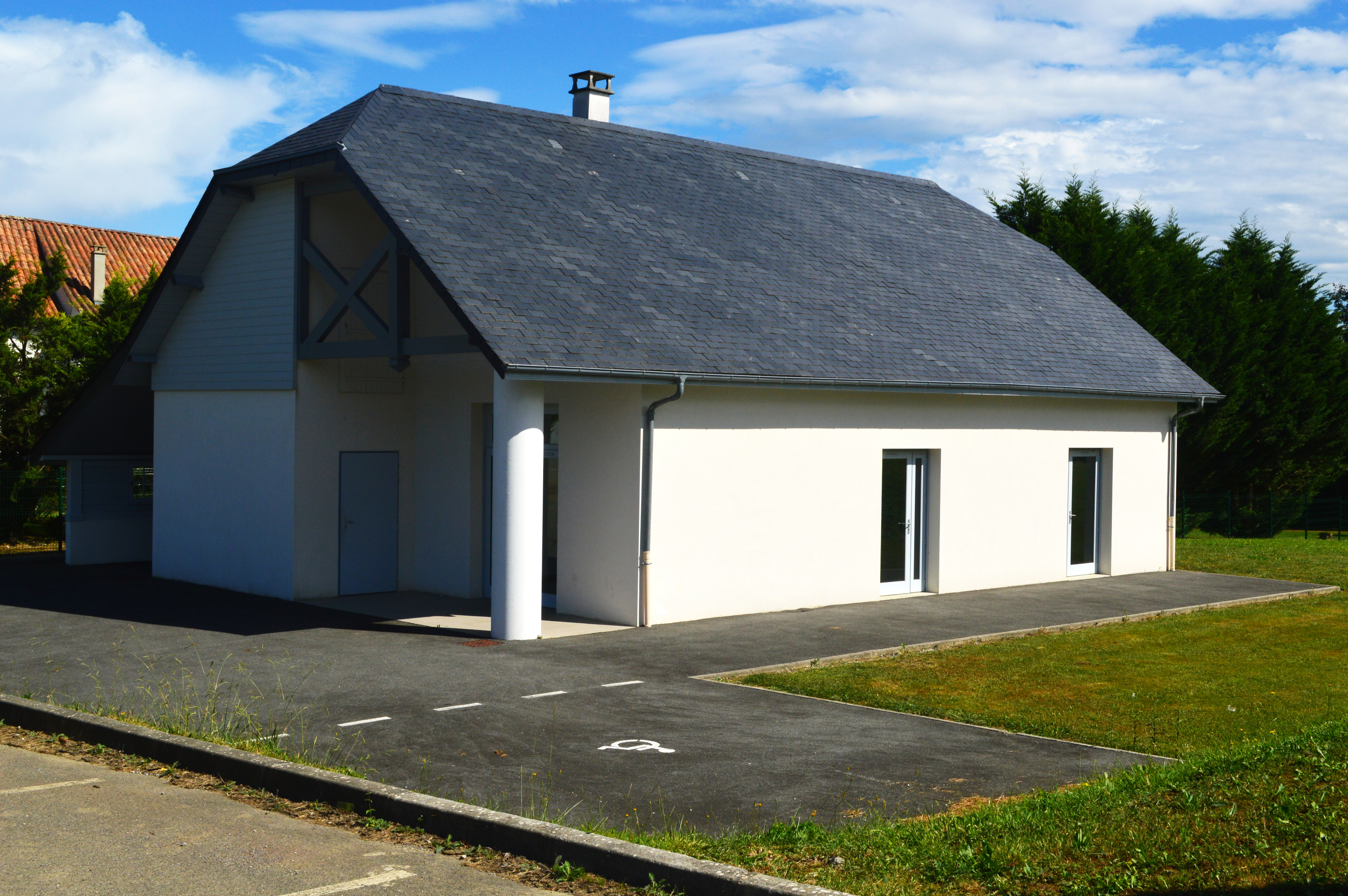
Arrast-Larrebieu Community Hall

List of Successive Mayors

From	To	Name	Party
1995	2014	Julien Erbin	UMP
2014	2026	Allande Davant	

=== Inter-communality ===
The commune is part of seven inter-communal structures:

- the Communauté d'agglomération du Pays Basque;
- the Sanitation association of Pays de Soule;
- the AEP association of Pays de Soule;
- the inter-communal association of la Vallée;
- the Energy association of Pyrénées-Atlantiques;
- the inter-communal association for the construction and operation of the CES at Mauleon;
- the association to support Basque culture.

== Demography ==
The inhabitants of the commune are known as Urrustoitars. The population data given in the table and graph below for 1836 and earlier refer to the former commune of Arrast.

Historical population

Year	Pop.	±% p.a.
1793	216	—
1821	191	−0.44%
1836	200	+0.31%
1841	323	+10.06%
1856	261	−1.41%
1872	235	−0.65%
1901	263	+0.39%
1926	225	−0.62%
1946	203	−0.51%
1962	173	−0.99%

Year	Pop.	±% p.a.
1968	144	−3.01%
1975	128	−1.67%
1982	131	+0.33%
1990	123	−0.78%
1999	105	−1.74%
2007	96	−1.11%
2012	96	+0.00%
2017	95	−0.21%
2023	96	+0.17%

Source: EHESS and INSEE

== Economy ==
Economic activity is mainly agricultural (livestock and pasture). The town is part of the Appellation d'origine contrôlée zone designation of Ossau-iraty.

== Culture and Heritage ==
=== Civil heritage ===
An enclosure with an earthen parapet (a protohistoric fort or Gaztelu zahar) at an altitude of 282 metres at a place called Gazteluxaga reflects the ancient past of the commune.

=== Religious heritage ===
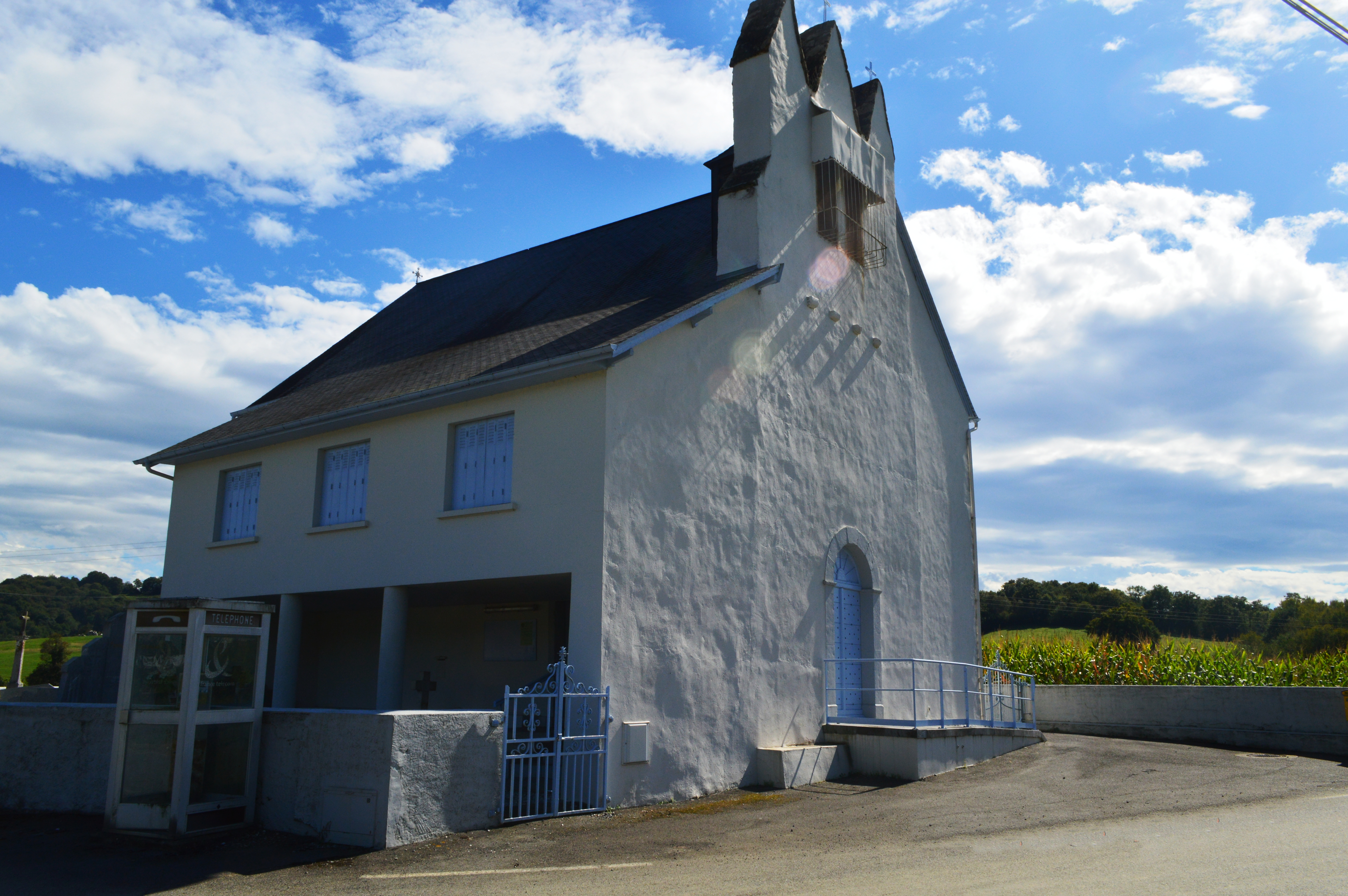
The church of Sainte-Lucie

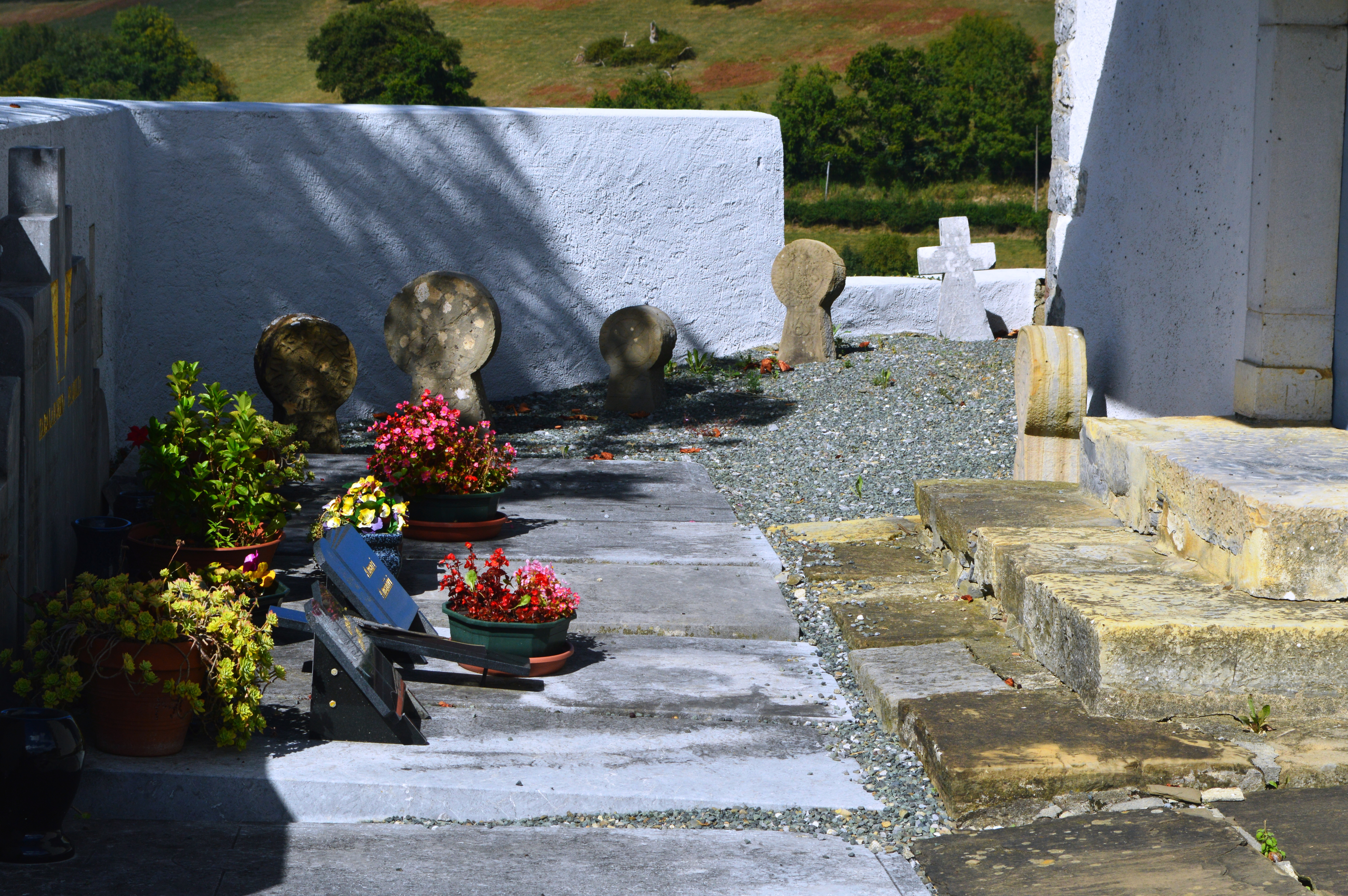
Hilarri in the Churchyard

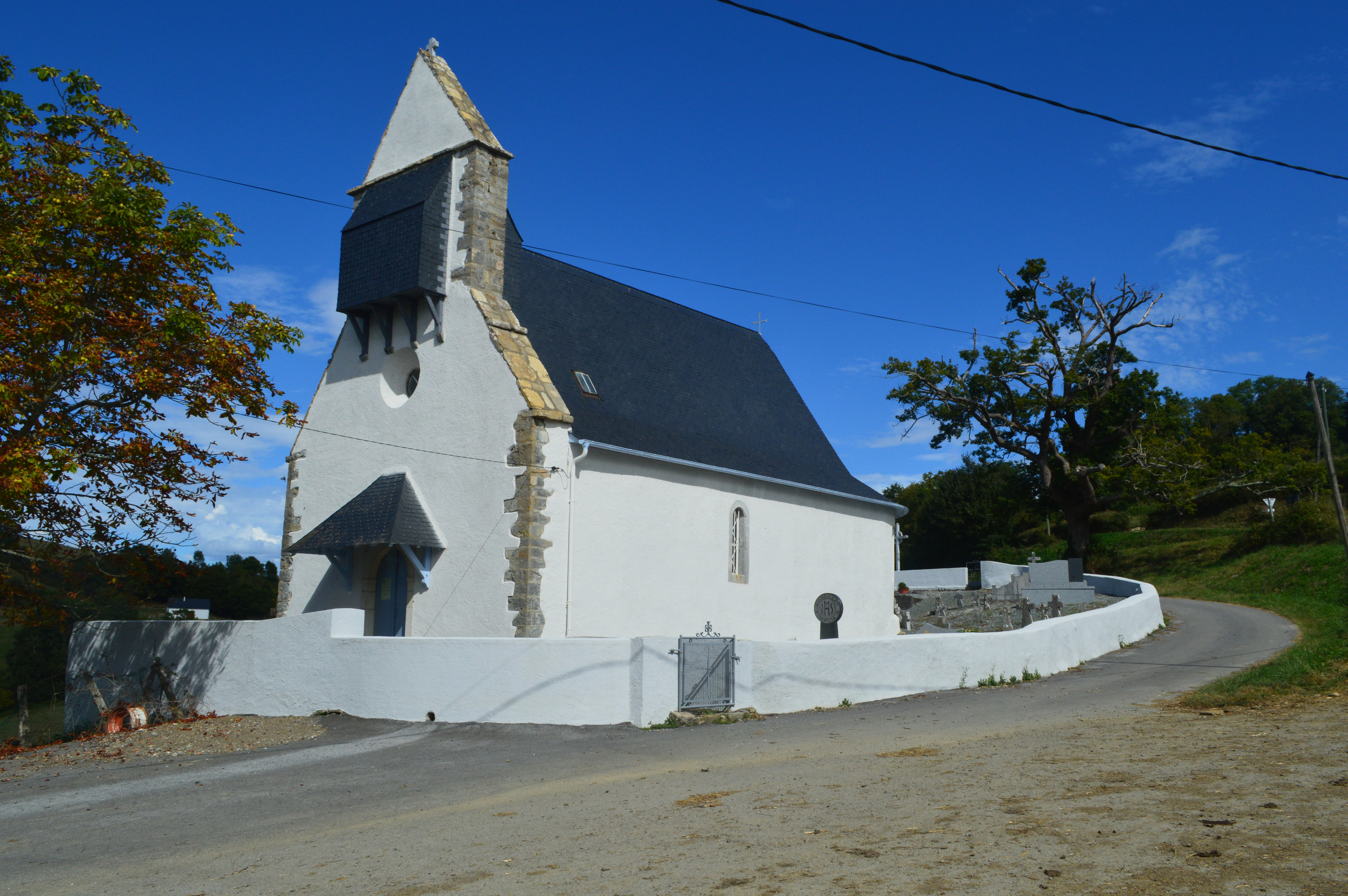
Chapel at Larrebieu

The Parish Church of Sainte-Lucie (19th century) is registered as an historical monument. It has a bell tower called Trinity or Souletin meaning the "top of the wall", pierced by bays for the bells with three roof peaks of approximately equal height, hence the name Trinity. The church contains a Processional Cross (17th century) which is registered as an historical object.

== Notable people linked to the commune ==
- Abbadie d'Arrast Family, initially lay abbots whose descendants originated the construction of various chateaux (the Château d'Abbadie at Hendaye, Elorriaga at Ciboure).
- Jean-Louis Davant, born in 1935 in Arrast-Larrebieu, is a writer, poet, bertsolari, pastoralari, and academician.

== See also ==
- Communes of the Pyrénées-Atlantiques department
