= Ainharp =

Ainharp Ainharbe
- Commune
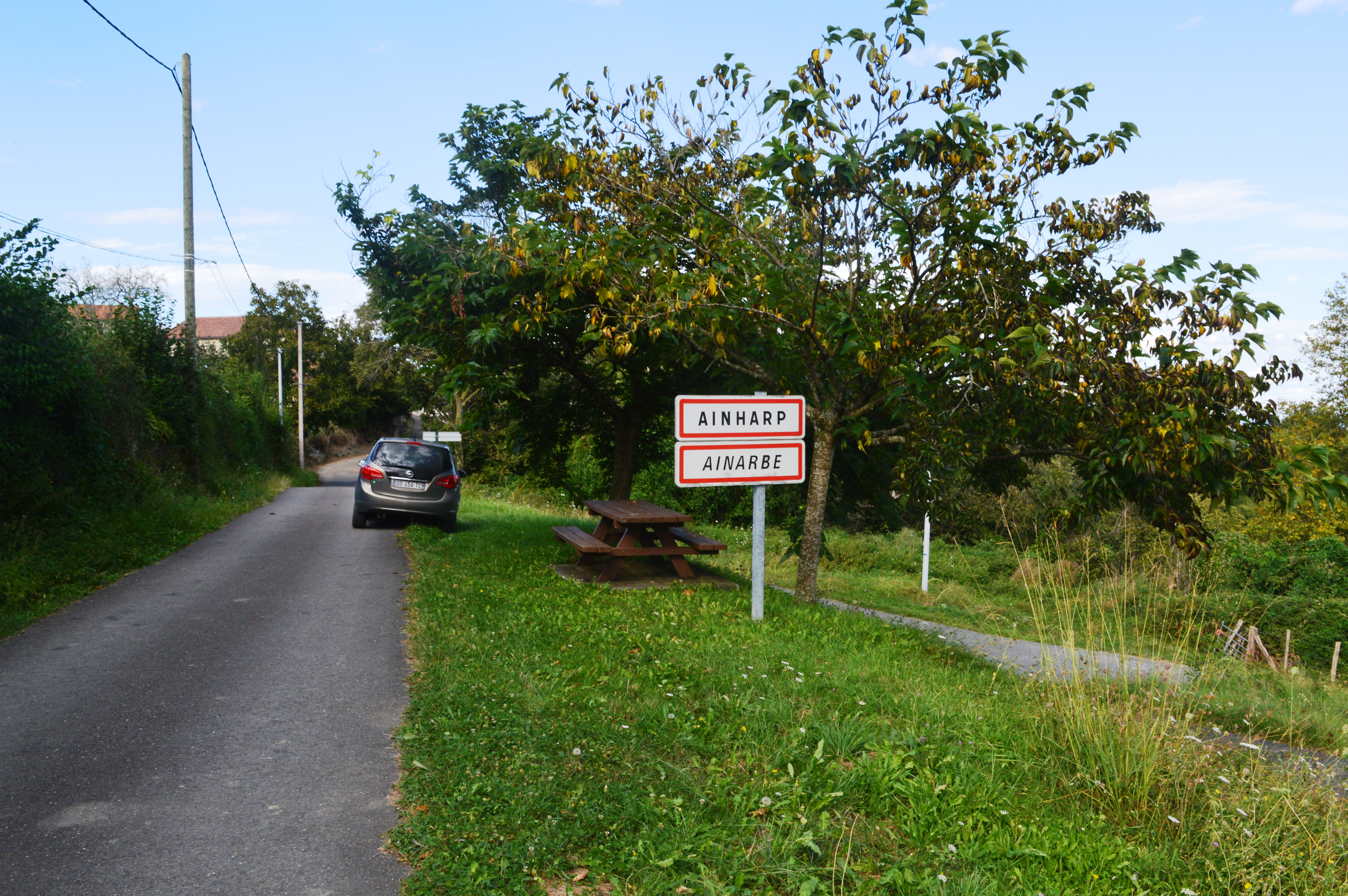
- The road into Ainharp
- Location of Ainharp
- Location within France Location within Nouvelle-Aquitaine
- Coordinates: 43°15′41″N 0°55′45″W
- Country: France
- Region: Nouvelle-Aquitaine
- Department: Pyrénées-Atlantiques
- Arrondissement: Oloron-Sainte-Marie
- Canton: Montagne Basque
- Intercommunality: Pays Basque

Government
  - Mayor (2020–2026): Jean-Pierre Arhanchiague
- Area^{1}: 14.07 km^{2} (5.43 sq mi)
- Elevation: 199 m (653 ft)
- Highest elevation: 426 m (1,398 ft)
- Lowest elevation: 129 m (423 ft)
- Population (2023): 131
  - Density: 9.31/km^{2} (24.1/sq mi)
- Time zone: UTC+01:00 (CET)
  - Summer (DST): UTC+02:00 (CEST)
- INSEE/Postal code: 64012 /64130
- ^{1} French Land Register data, which excludes lakes, ponds, glaciers > 1 km^{2} (0.386 sq mi or 247 acres) and river estuaries.

Ainharp (French pronunciation: [ajɲaʁp]; Basque: Ainharbe) is a commune in the Pyrénées-Atlantiques department in the Nouvelle-Aquitaine region in southwestern France.

== Geography ==
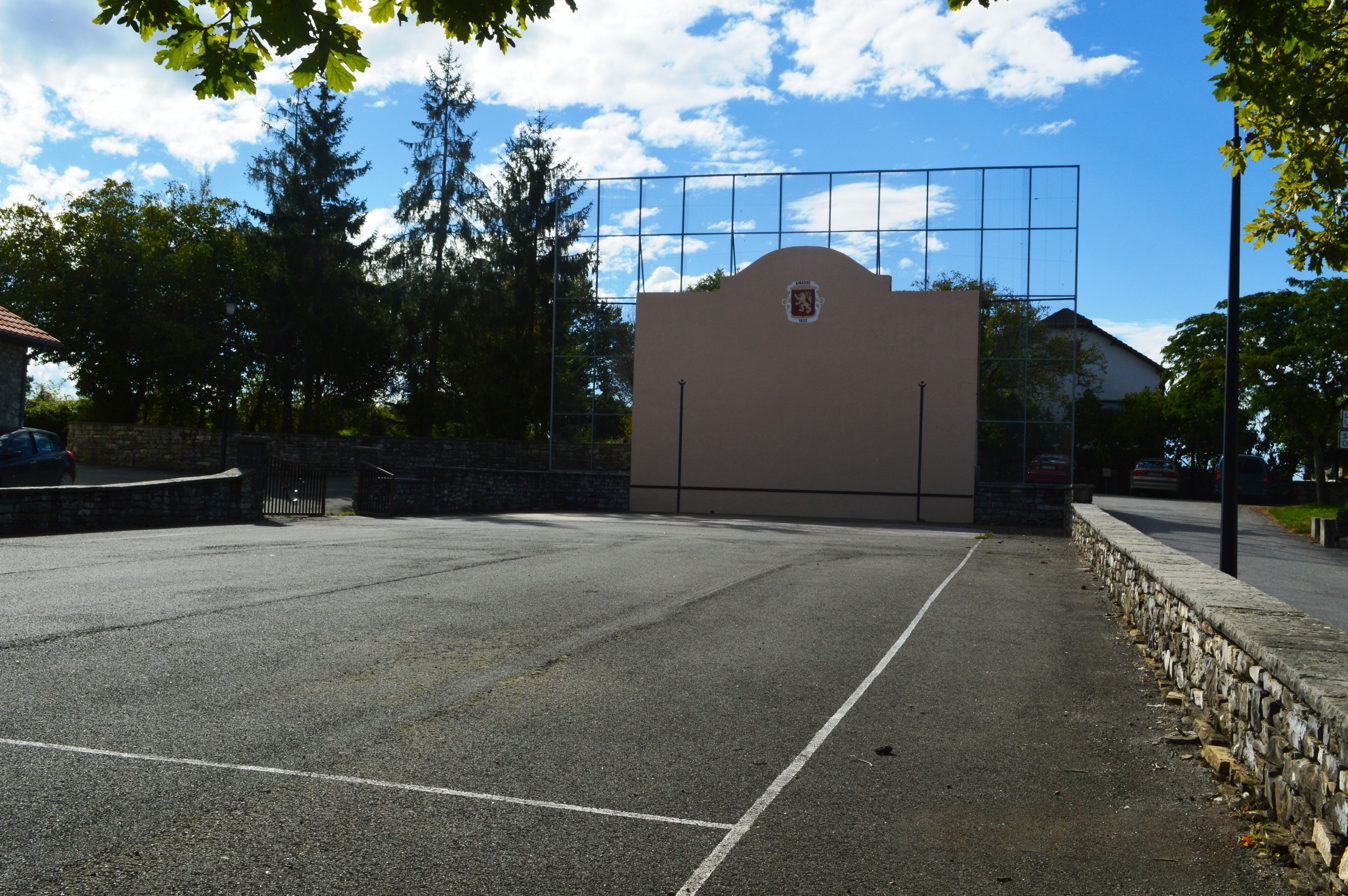
The Fronton at Ainharp

=== Location ===
Ainharp is located some 50 km west by southwest of Pau, 15 km southeast of Saint-Palais, and 10 km north-west of Mauleon-Licharre. It is part of the former province of Soule.

=== Access ===
The commune can be accessed by road D242 from Lohitzun-Oyhercq in the west passing through the village and continuing southeast to Mauleon-Licharre. The D344 road also goes to the north from the village through the commune then east to Espes-Undurein. The commune terrain is undulating of mixed farmland and forest.

=== Hydrography ===
Located in the drainage basin of the Adour, the commune is the source of numerous streams including the Lagardoye which forms part of the south-eastern border, the Quihilleri which forms much of the western border, and the Lafaure which forms much of the northern border.

=== Localities and hamlets ===
- Agueberria
- Agueberriborda
- Aisaguerpia
- Aranco
- Armagnague
- Arranchiaga
- Barrechia
- Bente
- Bidartia
- Bidegainia
- Bolondo
- Bordagaya
- Bordalecu
- Cabanna
- Cacoa
- Carricaburu
- Carricabuya
- Carricart
- Chorho
- Elhorria
- Elhorriberry
- Erreguenia
- Estecachoury
- Etchebarnia
- Etchebestemborda
- Etchecopar
- Garay
- Habiague
- Intsauspia
- Jaigüberria
- Larria
- Leiciagueçahar
- Lohitzun
- Mercapidia
- Oyhemburia
- Oyhenart
- Palasiona
- Pekeix
- Sallaberria
- Urruty
- Uthuriet

== Toponymy ==
The commune name in Basque is Ainharbe.

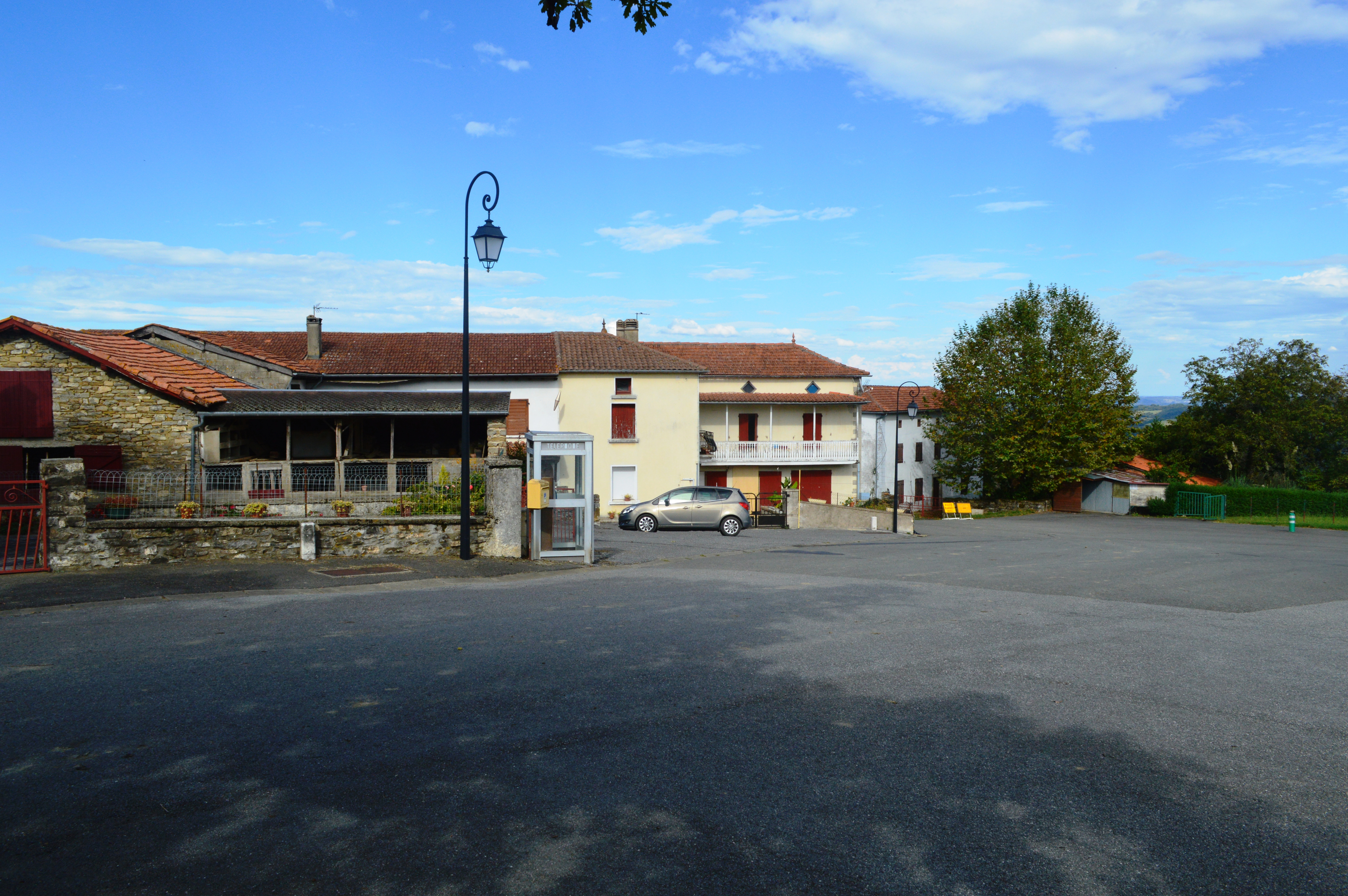
Ainharp Town Square

Jean-Baptiste Orpustan proposed two etymological interpretations:

- a meaning of "low heather" from ilharr meaning "heather" and -be (from behere meaning "low") or
- "height of the low rocks" from gain meaning "high" and har meaning "rock" that indicates the high position of the village on the left bank of the Saison.

The following table details the origins of the commune name and other names in the commune.

Name	Spelling	Date	Source	Page	Origin	Description
Ainharp	Ayharp	1472	Raymond	4	Notaries	Village
	Ainharp	1479	Orpustan	224		
	L'Espitau d'Anharp	1479	Raymond	4	Ohix	
	Aynharp	1479	Raymond	4	Ohix	
	Aignharp	1608	Raymond	4	Insinuations	
	Ayharp	1690	Orpustan	224		
Carricaburu	Carricaburue	1479	Raymond	42		Farm
Habiague	Habiague	1476	Raymond	74	Ohix	Farm
Lafaure	La Phaura	1538	Raymond	135	Reformation	Stream on the northern border
	La Phaure	1863	Raymond	135		
Lambare	lo bedat de Lambarre	1476	Raymond	91	Ohix	Hamlet and Wood
Chemin Mercadieu	lo cami Mercadieu	1479	Raymond	112	Ohix	Farm
	le cami deu Mercat	1479	Raymond	112		

Sources:

- Raymond: Topographic Dictionary of the Department of Basses-Pyrenees, 1863, on the page numbers indicated in the table. (in French)
- Orpustan: Jean-Baptiste Orpustan, New Basque Toponymy

Origins:

- Notaries: Notaries of Labastide-Villefranche
- Ohix:Contracts retained by Ohix, Notary of Soule
- Insinuations: Insinuations of the Diocese of Oloron
- Reformation: Reformation of Béarn

== History ==
Paul Raymond noted on page 4 of his 1863 dictionary that the commune was a former priory in the diocese of Oloron and that there was a hospital for pilgrims.

== Administration ==
List of Successive Mayors of Ainharp

Mayors from the French Revolution to 1929

From	To	Name
1794	1807	Bernard Aguerreberry
1807	1820	Armand Oyhenburu
1820	1848	Jean Etchart
1848	1852	Martin Salamendy
1852	1854	Jean Etchart
1854	1855	Alexandre Bente
1855	1858	Pierre Mercabide
1858	1871	Bernard Etchart
1871	1874	Echeberry
1874	1880	Marc Iratchet
1880	1884	Marc Barneche
1884	1885	Joseph Armagnague
1885	1888	Roch Guiresse
1888	1892	Marc Barneche
1892	1908	St. Jean Etchart
1908	1929	Francois Barneche

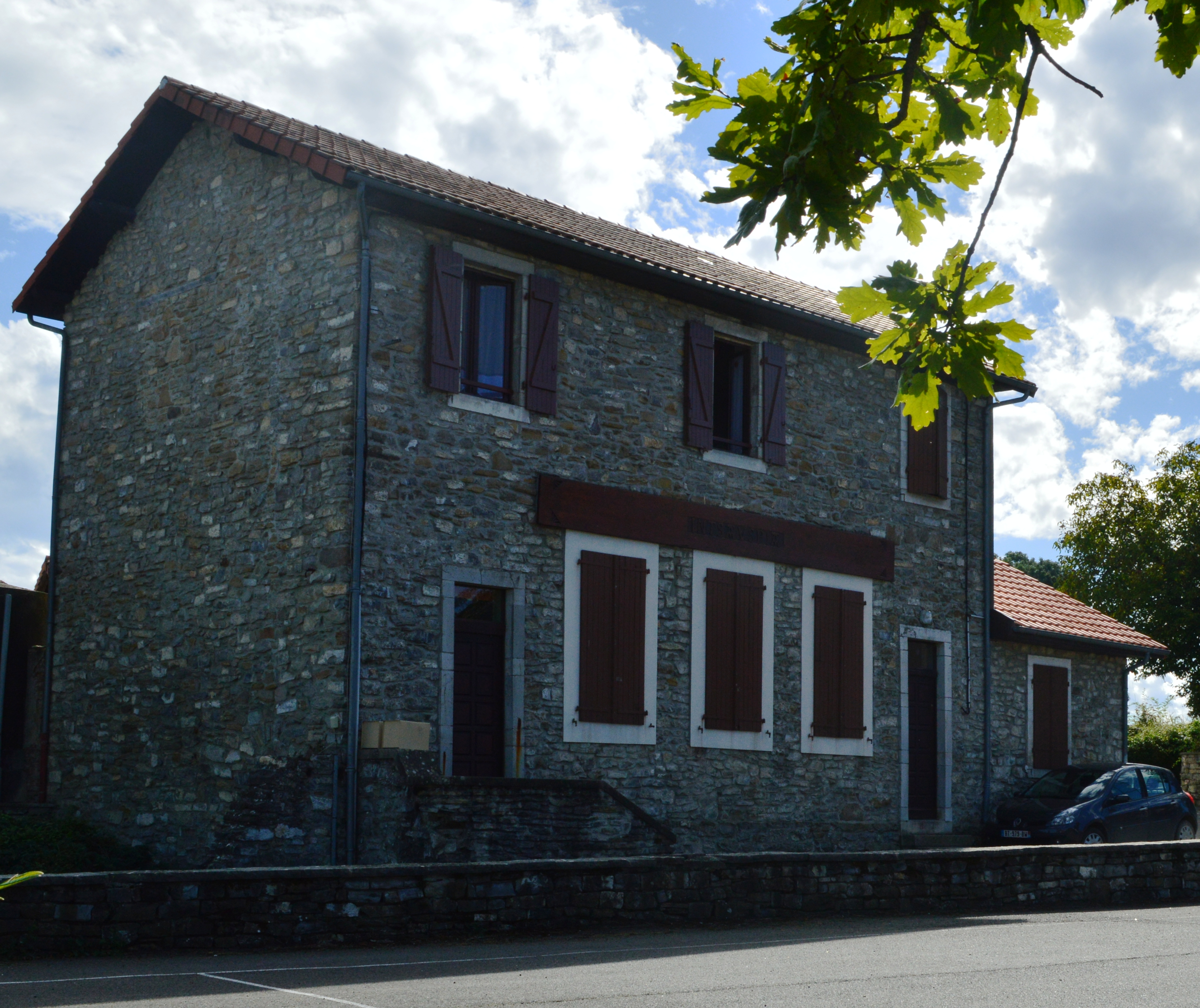
The Town Hall

Mayors from 1929

From	To	Name
1929	1950	Jean Guiresse
1950	1959	François Elissiry
1959	1971	Jean-Pierre Aguer
1971	1983	Jean Lascaray
1983	2026	Jean-Pierre Arhanchiague

=== Inter-communality ===
Ainharp is a member of seven intercommunal structures:

- the Communauté d'agglomération du Pays Basque
- the association to support Basque culture
- the intercommunal association of the Valley
- the intercommunal association for the construction and operation of the CES of Mauleon
- the AEP association for Soule Country
- the remediation association for Soule Country
- the energy association of the Pyrénées-Atlantiques

== Population ==
The inhabitants of the commune are known as Ainharbars or Ainharbear.

Historical population
Year	Pop.	±% p.a.
1968	194	—
1975	186	−0.60%
1982	181	−0.39%
1990	161	−1.45%
1999	142	−1.39%
2007	151	+0.77%
2012	143	−1.08%
2017	141	−0.28%
2023	131	−1.22%
Source: INSEE

== Economy ==
The activity is mainly agricultural (maize and livestock). The town is part of the Appellation d'origine contrôlée (AOC) zone of Ossau-iraty.

== Culture and heritage ==
=== Religious Heritage ===
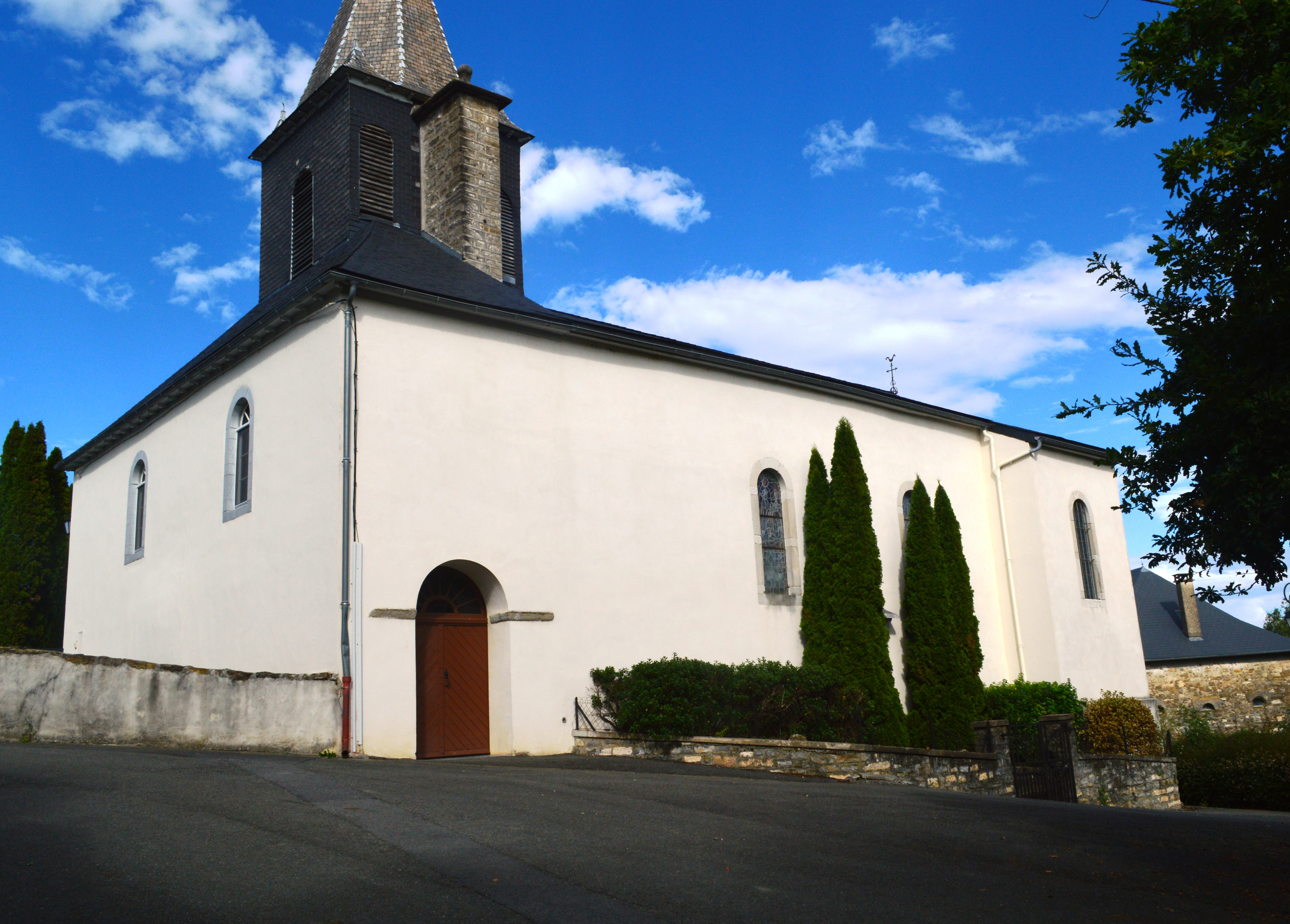
Ainharp Church

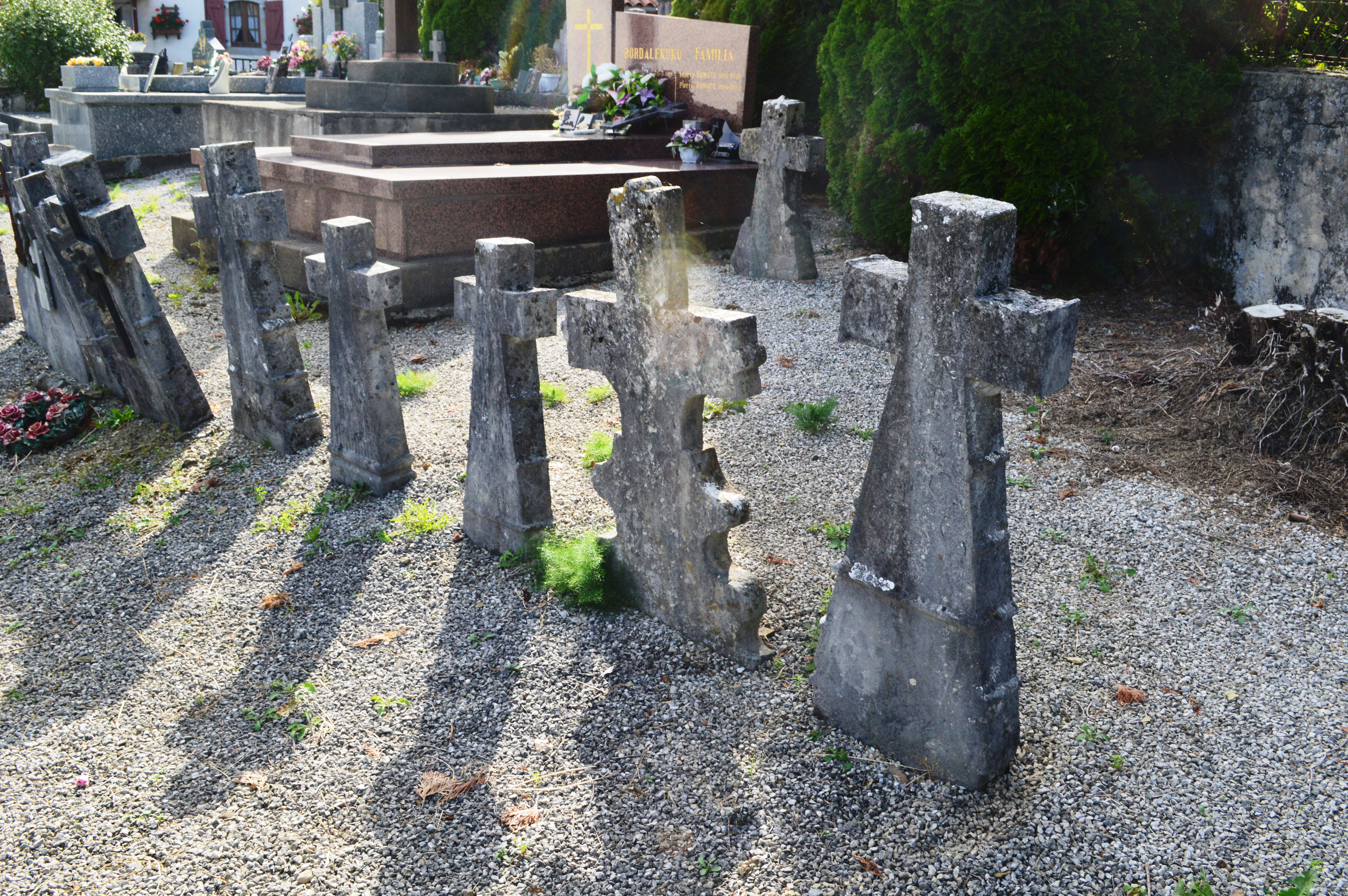
Old Hilarri in the churchyard

The commune has a church which dates back to the 11th century and a Calvary-Bell Tower from the 17th century. Its cemetery features Hilarri dating from the time of the bell tower.

The village is located on a secondary road of the pilgrimage to Saint Jacques de Compostela which passes on the highway to Ports de Cize, the priory of Saint-Palais to Saint-Michel-le-Vieux which had a hospice for pilgrims called Benta then to L'Hôpital-Saint-Blaise, Osserain, Pagolle, Roquiague, Haux, Larrau, and Ordiarp.

== Facilities ==
The commune has a primary school.

== See also ==
- Communes of the Pyrénées-Atlantiques department
