= Sardeka =

Sardeka is generally attributed to mounts (borrowed from a neighboring pass):

- Sardeka mounts (494 m), in Gotein-Libarrenx
- Hargaina Sardeka (852 m), in Aussurucq
