= Charritte-de-Bas =

Charritte-de-Bas Sarrikotape
- Commune
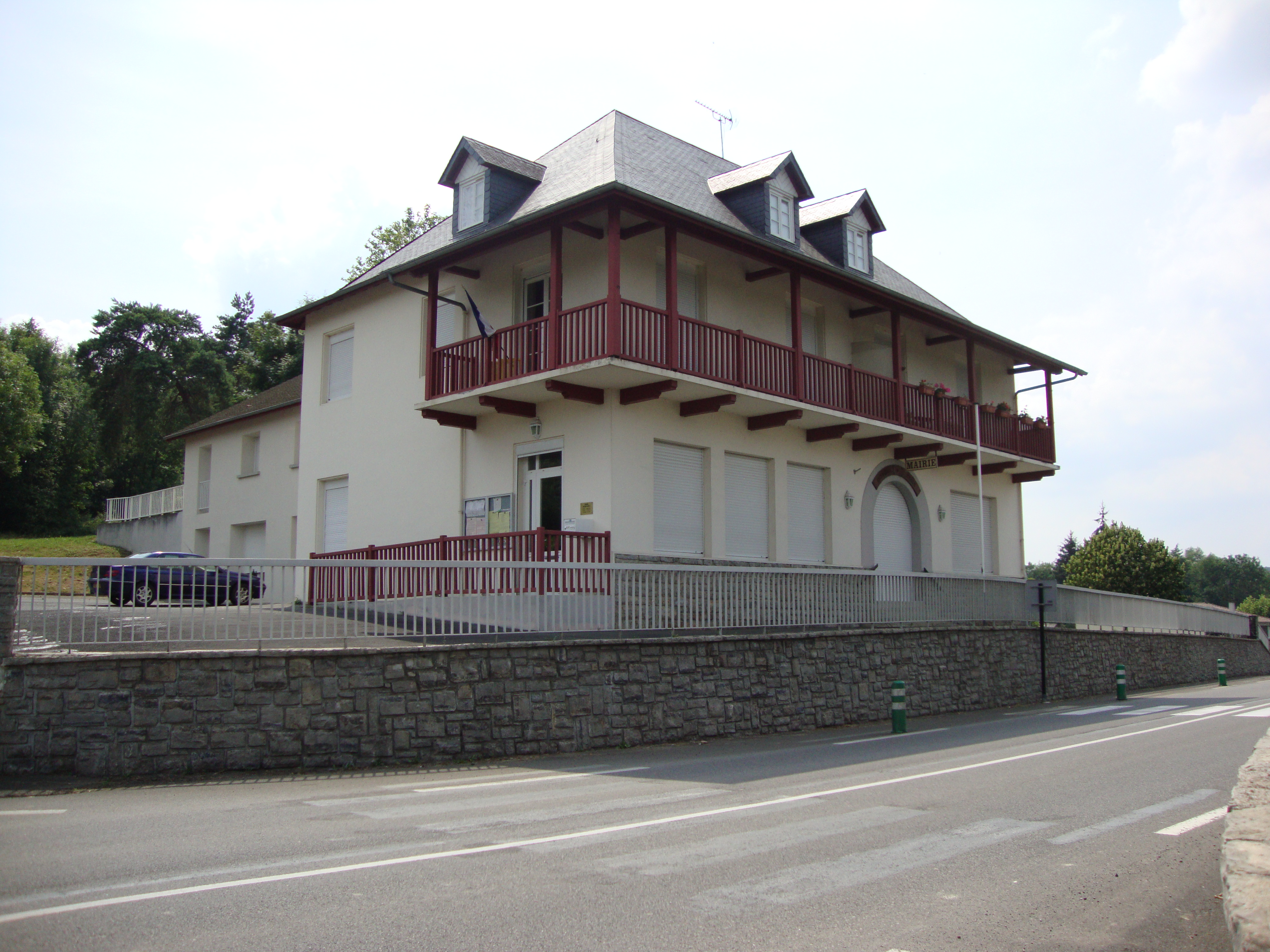
- The town hall of Charitte de-Bas
- Location of Charritte-de-Bas
- Location within France Location within Nouvelle-Aquitaine
- Coordinates: 43°17′41″N 0°52′51″W
- Country: France
- Region: Nouvelle-Aquitaine
- Department: Pyrénées-Atlantiques
- Arrondissement: Oloron-Sainte-Marie
- Canton: Montagne Basque
- Intercommunality: CA Pays Basque

Government
  - Mayor (2024–2026): Pierre Mongaburu
- Area^{1}: 7.40 km^{2} (2.86 sq mi)
- Elevation: 102 m (335 ft)
- Highest elevation: 223 m (732 ft)
- Lowest elevation: 99 m (325 ft)
- Population (2023): 242
  - Density: 32.7/km^{2} (84.7/sq mi)
- Time zone: UTC+01:00 (CET)
  - Summer (DST): UTC+02:00 (CEST)
- INSEE/Postal code: 64187 /64130
- ^{1} French Land Register data, which excludes lakes, ponds, glaciers > 1 km^{2} (0.386 sq mi or 247 acres) and river estuaries.

Charritte-de-Bas (French pronunciation: [ʃaʁit də ba]; Occitan: Sharrita de Baish; Basque: Sarrikotape) is a commune in the Pyrénées-Atlantiques department in south-western France.

It is located in the former province of Soule.

The steeple of the church is a trinitarian one.

== See also ==
- Communes of the Pyrénées-Atlantiques department
