= Musculdy =

Musculdy Muskildi (Basque)
- Commune
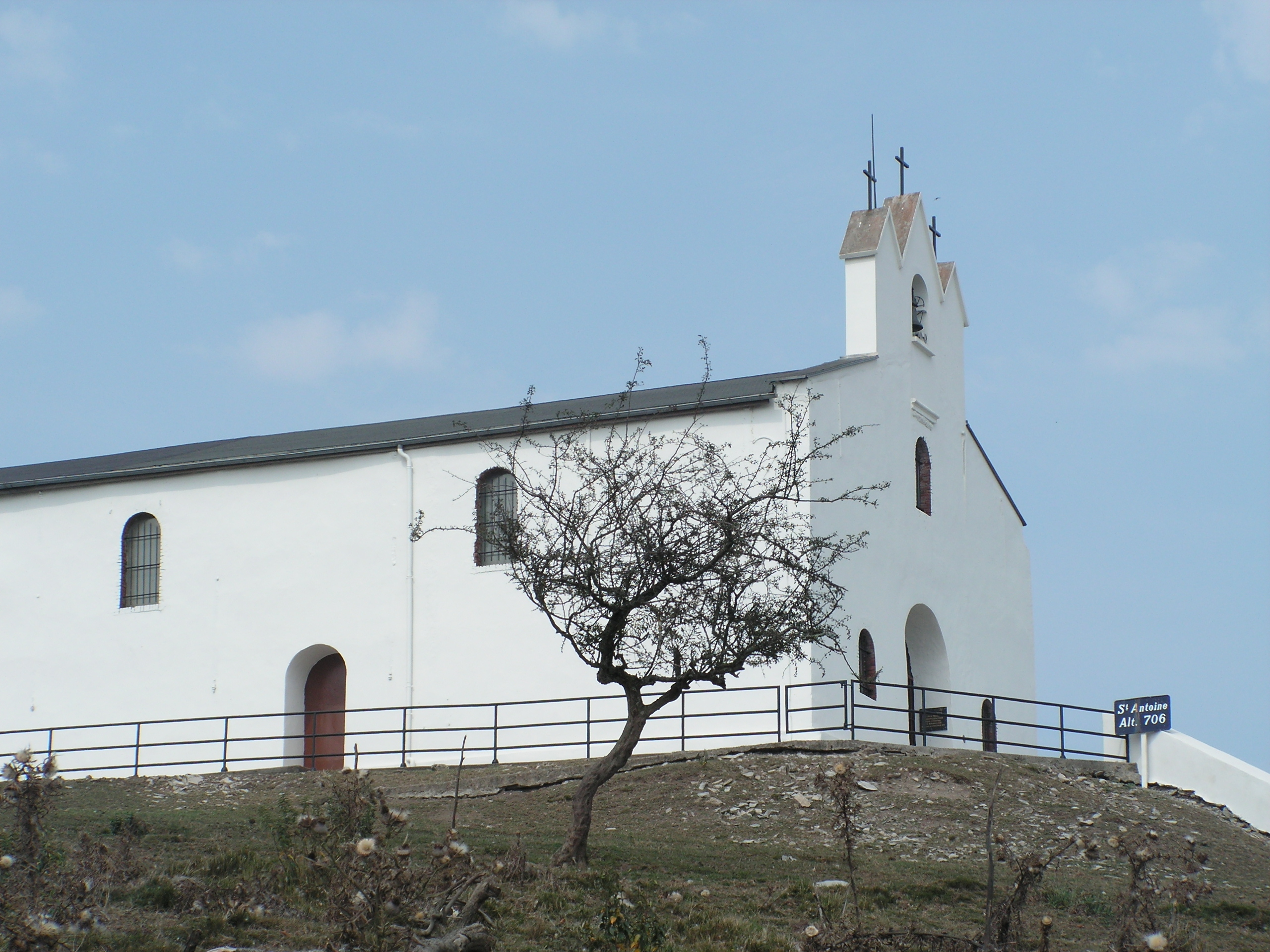
- The chapel of Saint-Antoine
- Location of Musculdy
- Location within France Location within Nouvelle-Aquitaine
- Coordinates: 43°11′52″N 0°57′53″W
- Country: France
- Region: Nouvelle-Aquitaine
- Department: Pyrénées-Atlantiques
- Arrondissement: Oloron-Sainte-Marie
- Canton: Montagne Basque
- Intercommunality: CA Pays Basque

Government
  - Mayor (2020–2026): Josette Boscq
- Area^{1}: 24.06 km^{2} (9.29 sq mi)
- Elevation: 198 m (650 ft)
- Highest elevation: 813 m (2,667 ft)
- Lowest elevation: 180 m (590 ft)
- Population (2023): 220
  - Density: 9.1/km^{2} (24/sq mi)
- Time zone: UTC+01:00 (CET)
  - Summer (DST): UTC+02:00 (CEST)
- INSEE/Postal code: 64411 /64130
- ^{1} French Land Register data, which excludes lakes, ponds, glaciers > 1 km^{2} (0.386 sq mi or 247 acres) and river estuaries.

Musculdy (French pronunciation: [myskyldi]; Occitan: Musclat; Basque: Muskildi) is a commune in the Pyrénées-Atlantiques department in south-western France.

It is located in the historical province of Soule.

== See also ==
- Communes of the Pyrénées-Atlantiques department
