= Viodos-Abense-de-Bas =

Viodos-Abense-de-Bas Bidoze-Onizepea (Basque)
- Commune
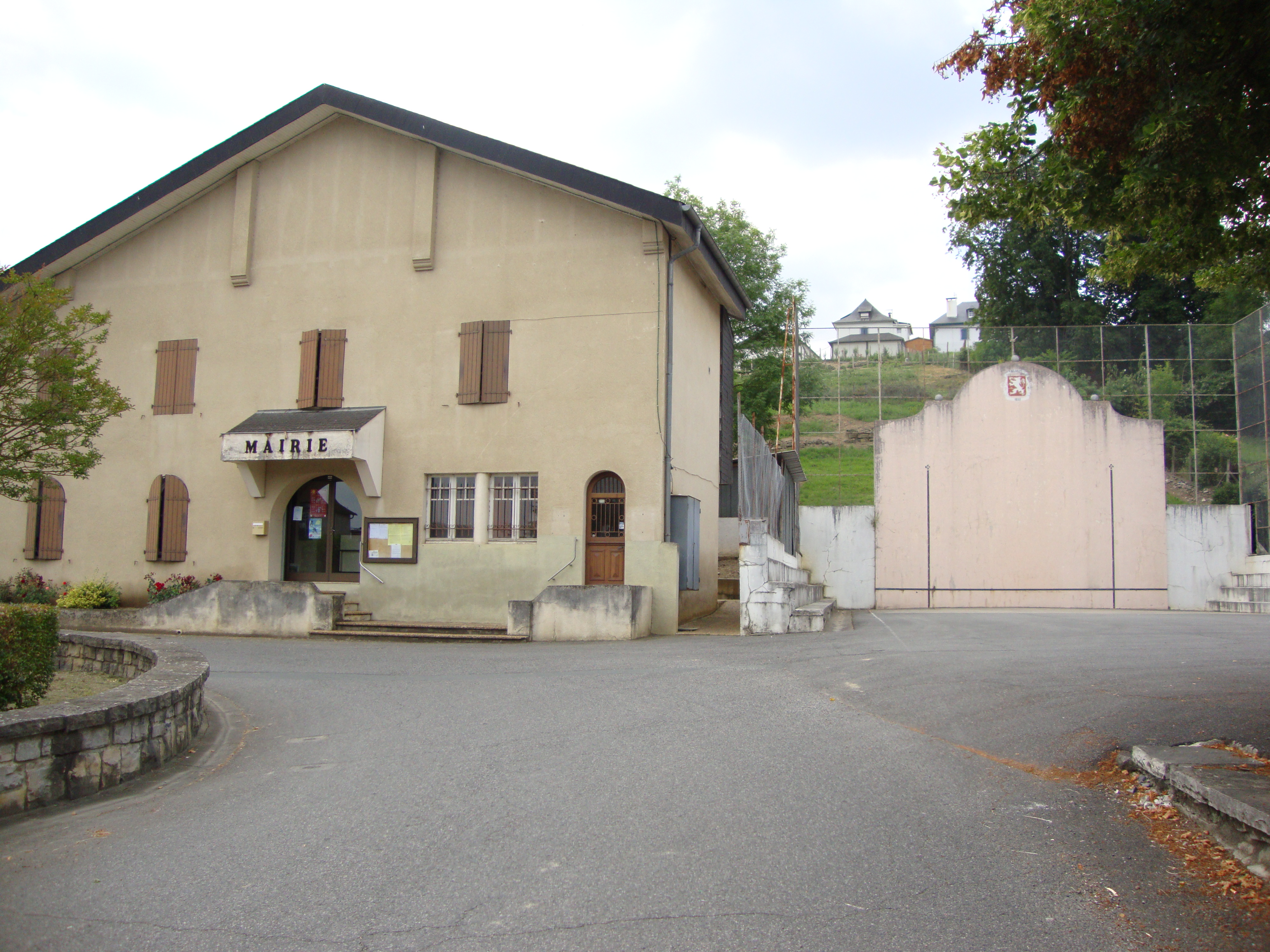
- Town hall and pelote court
- Location of Viodos-Abense-de-Bas
- Location within France Location within Nouvelle-Aquitaine
- Coordinates: 43°14′30″N 0°52′48″W
- Country: France
- Region: Nouvelle-Aquitaine
- Department: Pyrénées-Atlantiques
- Arrondissement: Oloron-Sainte-Marie
- Canton: Montagne Basque
- Intercommunality: CA Pays Basque

Government
  - Mayor (2020–2026): Christian Berçaïts
- Area^{1}: 13 km^{2} (5.0 sq mi)
- Elevation: 130 m (430 ft)
- Highest elevation: 420 m (1,380 ft)
- Lowest elevation: 110 m (360 ft)
- Population (2023): 747
  - Density: 57/km^{2} (150/sq mi)
- Time zone: UTC+01:00 (CET)
  - Summer (DST): UTC+02:00 (CEST)
- INSEE/Postal code: 64559 /64130
- ^{1} French Land Register data, which excludes lakes, ponds, glaciers > 1 km^{2} (0.386 sq mi or 247 acres) and river estuaries.

Viodos-Abense-de-Bas (French pronunciation: [vjɔdɔs abɛ̃s də ba]; Basque: Bildoze-Onizepea; Occitan: Biudòs-Avensa de Baish) is a commune in the Pyrénées-Atlantiques department in south-western France.

It is located in the former province of Soule.

The steeple of the church is a trinitarian one.

== Hydrography ==
The lands of the commune are watered by the Saison, which flows into the Gave d'Oloron, and by its tributary, the brook Borlaas.

== Places and hamlets ==
The municipality of Viodos-Abense-de-Bas consists of eight districts:

=== Viodos ===
- Bürgüa;
- Ekhibegia;
- Errekalde (Errekaltea on the IGN maps);
- Harizbidea (Haiz Bidia on IGN maps);
- Ordokia (La Plaine in French);
- Zübüalde (Zübialdea on the IGN maps)

=== Abense-de-Bas ===
- Onizepea ( Abense-de-Bas in French);
- Plaxotalte

== Education ==
The town has two schools: the public primary school Abense-de-Bas and the public primary school Bourg.

== Economy ==
The activity is mainly focused on agriculture (livestock and pasture).

== See also ==
- Communes of the Pyrénées-Atlantiques department
