= Berrogain-Laruns =

- Commune
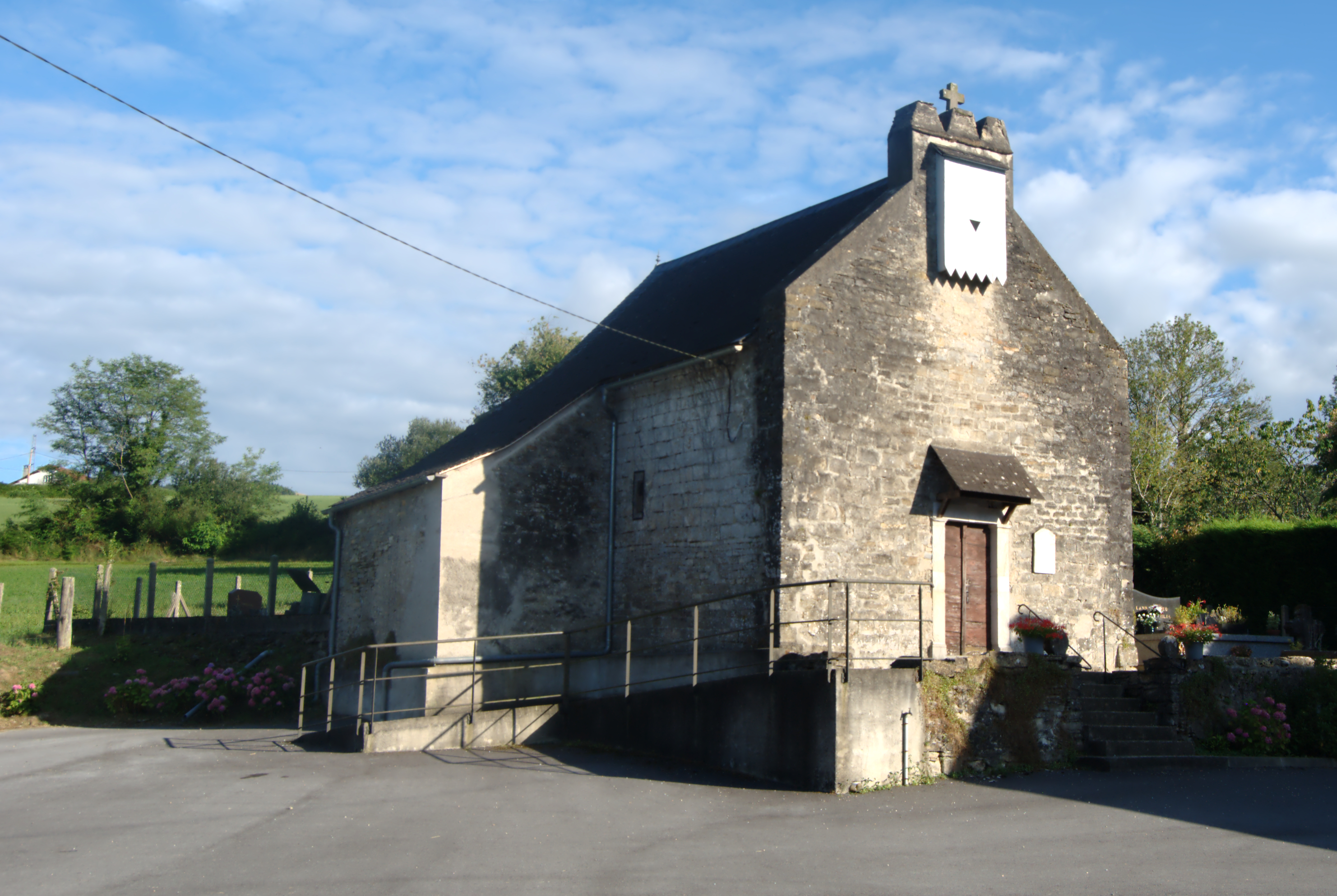
- The church of Berrogain
- Location of Berrogain-Laruns
- Location within France Location within Nouvelle-Aquitaine
- Coordinates: 43°14′45″N 0°51′48″W
- Country: France
- Region: Nouvelle-Aquitaine
- Department: Pyrénées-Atlantiques
- Arrondissement: Oloron-Sainte-Marie
- Canton: Montagne Basque
- Intercommunality: CA Pays Basque

Government
  - Mayor (2020–2026): Thierry Perrot
- Area^{1}: 2.68 km^{2} (1.03 sq mi)
- Elevation: 233 m (764 ft)
- Highest elevation: 290 m (950 ft)
- Lowest elevation: 117 m (384 ft)
- Population (2023): 160
  - Density: 60/km^{2} (150/sq mi)
- Time zone: UTC+01:00 (CET)
  - Summer (DST): UTC+02:00 (CEST)
- INSEE/Postal code: 64115 /64130
- ^{1} French Land Register data, which excludes lakes, ponds, glaciers > 1 km^{2} (0.386 sq mi or 247 acres) and river estuaries.

Berrogain-Laruns (French pronunciation: [bɛʁɔɡɛ̃ laʁœ̃s]; Basque: Berrogaine-Lahüntze) is a commune of the Pyrénées-Atlantiques department in southwestern France.

It is located in the former province of Soule.

The steeple of the church is a trinitarian one.

== See also ==
- Communes of the Pyrénées-Atlantiques department
