= Gotein-Libarrenx =

Gotein-Libarrenx Gotaine-Irabarne
- Commune
- The church of Gotein
- Location of Gotein-Libarrenx
- Location within France Location within Nouvelle-Aquitaine
- Coordinates: 43°11′28″N 0°53′59″W
- Country: France
- Region: Nouvelle-Aquitaine
- Department: Pyrénées-Atlantiques
- Arrondissement: Oloron-Sainte-Marie
- Canton: Montagne Basque
- Intercommunality: CA Pays Basque

Government
  - Mayor (2020–2026): Bernard Lougarot
- Area^{1}: 11.75 km^{2} (4.54 sq mi)
- Elevation: 363 m (1,191 ft)
- Highest elevation: 585 m (1,919 ft)
- Lowest elevation: 140 m (460 ft)
- Population (2023): 479
  - Density: 40.8/km^{2} (106/sq mi)
- Time zone: UTC+01:00 (CET)
  - Summer (DST): UTC+02:00 (CEST)
- INSEE/Postal code: 64247 /64130
- ^{1} French Land Register data, which excludes lakes, ponds, glaciers > 1 km^{2} (0.386 sq mi or 247 acres) and river estuaries.

Gotein-Libarrenx (French pronunciation: [ɡɔtɛ̃ libaʁɛ̃ks]; Occitan: Gota; Basque: Gotaine-Irabarne) is a commune in the Pyrénées-Atlantiques department in south-western France. It is located in the former province of Soule. The steeple of the church is a trinitarian one.

== See also ==
- Communes of the Pyrénées-Atlantiques department
