= Mauléon-Licharre =

Mauléon-Licharre Maule-Lextarre
- Commune
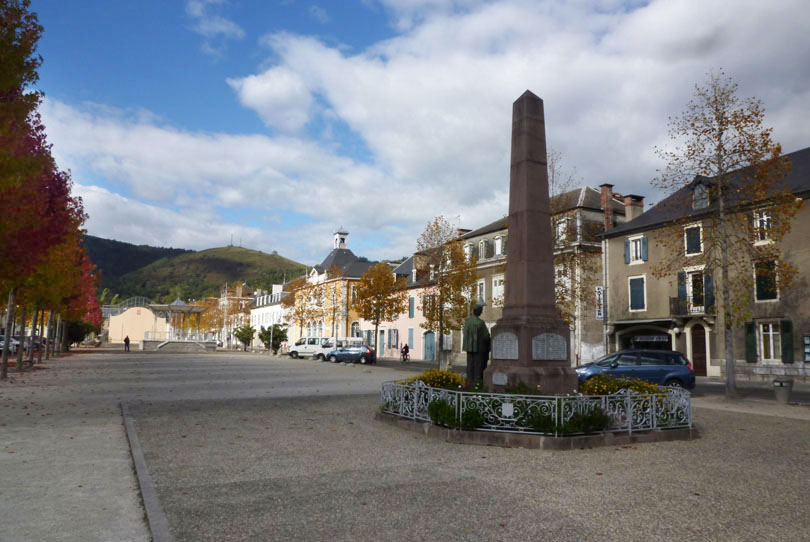
- Main square, Mauléon

- Coat of arms
- Location of Mauléon-Licharre
- Location within France Location within Nouvelle-Aquitaine
- Coordinates: 43°13′31″N 0°53′09″W
- Country: France
- Region: Nouvelle-Aquitaine
- Department: Pyrénées-Atlantiques
- Arrondissement: Oloron-Sainte-Marie
- Canton: Montagne Basque
- Intercommunality: CA Pays Basque

Government
  - Mayor (2020–2026): Louis Labadot
- Area^{1}: 13 km^{2} (5.0 sq mi)
- Elevation: 214 m (702 ft)
- Highest elevation: 521 m (1,709 ft)
- Lowest elevation: 133 m (436 ft)
- Population (2023): 2,972
  - Density: 230/km^{2} (590/sq mi)
- Time zone: UTC+01:00 (CET)
  - Summer (DST): UTC+02:00 (CEST)
- INSEE/Postal code: 64371 /64130
- ^{1} French Land Register data, which excludes lakes, ponds, glaciers > 1 km^{2} (0.386 sq mi or 247 acres) and river estuaries.

Mauléon-Licharre (French pronunciation: [moleɔ̃ liʃaʁ]; Basque: Maule-Lextarre, Occitan: Maulion e Lisharra), or simply Mauléon, is a commune in the Pyrénées-Atlantiques department in southwestern France.

It is the capital of the Soule (Zuberoa) historical Basque province.

It is home to the canvas shoe, the espadrille and etorki cheese.

== Demographics ==
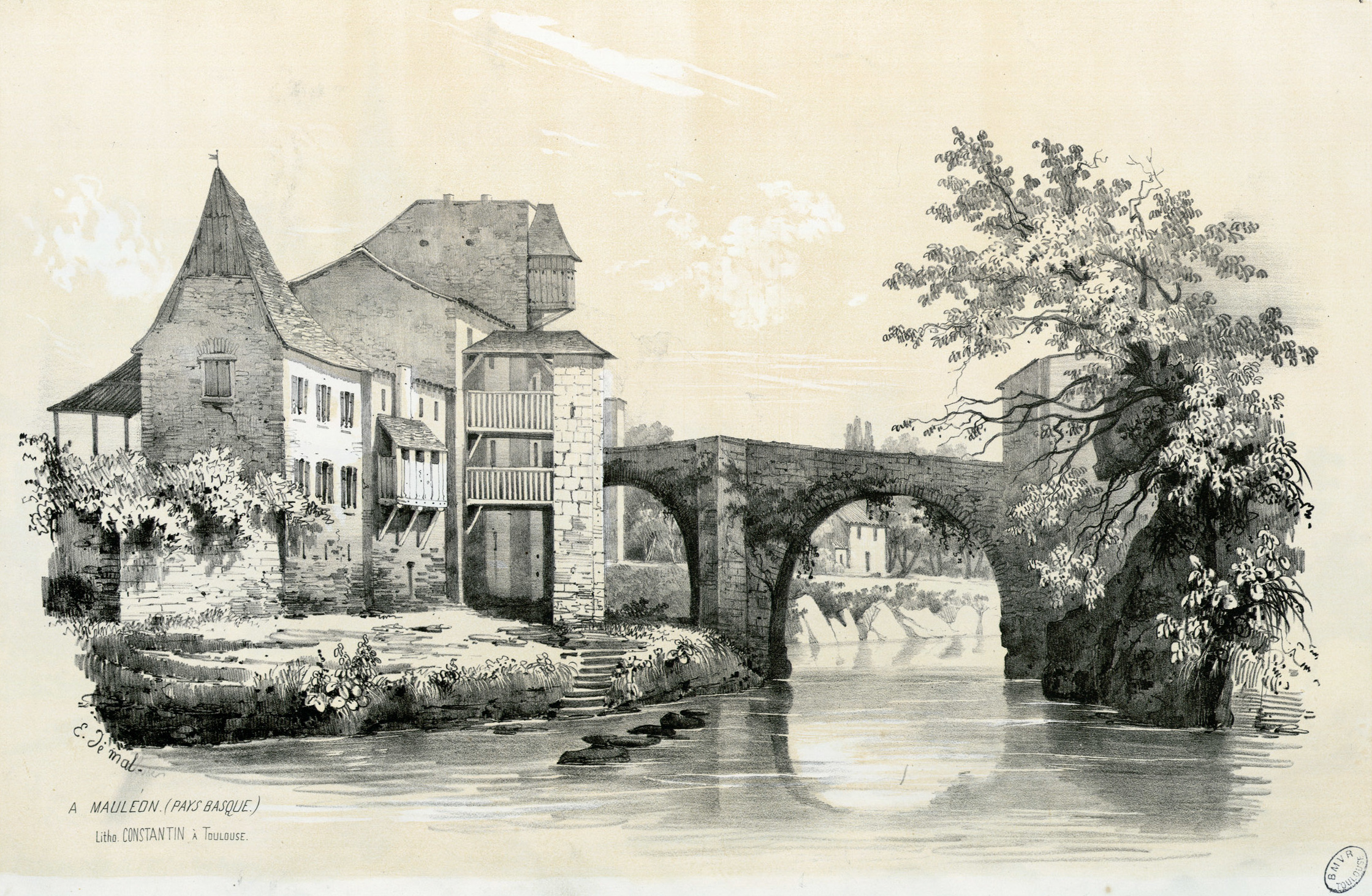
Mauléon in 1843 by Eugène de Malbos.

Historical population

Year	Pop.	±% p.a.
1793	862	—
1800	985	+1.92%
1806	1,007	+0.37%
1821	1,054	+0.30%
1831	1,145	+0.83%
1836	1,259	+1.92%
1841	1,577	+4.61%
1846	1,654	+0.96%
1851	1,600	−0.66%
1856	1,475	−1.61%
1861	1,708	+2.98%
1866	1,876	+1.89%
1872	1,743	−1.22%
1876	2,108	+4.87%
1881	2,409	+2.71%
1886	2,251	−1.35%
1891	2,575	+2.73%
1896	2,651	+0.58%
1901	3,368	+4.90%

Year	Pop.	±% p.a.
1906	4,045	+3.73%
1911	4,827	+3.60%
1921	4,220	−1.33%
1926	4,316	+0.45%
1931	4,069	−1.17%
1936	4,193	+0.60%
1946	4,567	+0.86%
1954	4,619	+0.14%
1962	4,679	+0.16%
1968	4,500	−0.65%
1975	4,239	−0.85%
1982	4,099	−0.48%
1990	3,533	−1.84%
1999	3,347	−0.60%
2007	3,228	−0.45%
2012	3,145	−0.52%
2017	2,954	−1.25%
2023	2,972	+0.10%

Source: EHESS and INSEE

== See also ==
- Communes of the Pyrénées-Atlantiques department
