= Espès-Undurein =

Espès-Undurein Espeize-Ündüreine
- Commune
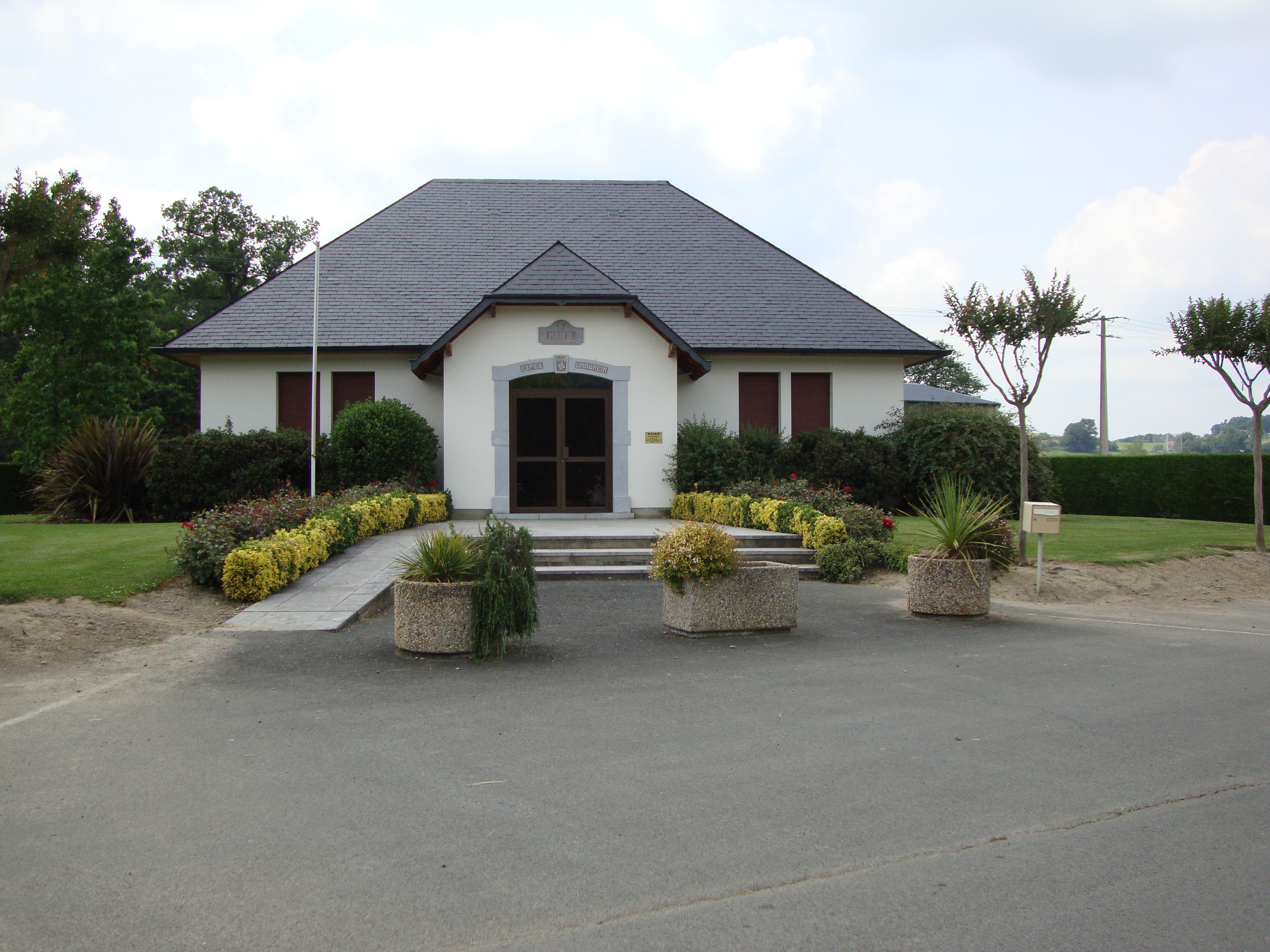
- The town hall of Espès-Undurein
- Location of Espès-Undurein
- Location within France Location within Nouvelle-Aquitaine
- Coordinates: 43°16′06″N 0°52′45″W
- Country: France
- Region: Nouvelle-Aquitaine
- Department: Pyrénées-Atlantiques
- Arrondissement: Oloron-Sainte-Marie
- Canton: Montagne Basque
- Intercommunality: CA Pays Basque

Government
  - Mayor (2020–2026): Michel Ibarra
- Area^{1}: 9.78 km^{2} (3.78 sq mi)
- Elevation: 149 m (489 ft)
- Highest elevation: 233 m (764 ft)
- Lowest elevation: 105 m (344 ft)
- Population (2023): 506
  - Density: 51.7/km^{2} (134/sq mi)
- Time zone: UTC+01:00 (CET)
  - Summer (DST): UTC+02:00 (CEST)
- INSEE/Postal code: 64214 /64130
- ^{1} French Land Register data, which excludes lakes, ponds, glaciers > 1 km^{2} (0.386 sq mi or 247 acres) and river estuaries.

Espès-Undurein (French pronunciation: [ɛspɛs œ̃dyʁɛ̃]; Basque: Espeize-Ündüreine) is a commune in the Pyrénées-Atlantiques department in south-western France.

It is located in the former province of Soule.

== See also ==
- Communes of the Pyrénées-Atlantiques department
