= Soule =

Coordinates: 43°14′N 0°53′W

Soule Xiberoa or Zuberoa
- Province
- Flag Coat of arms

- Location of Soule within the Pyrénées-Atlantiques departement and the Northern Basque Country.
- Country: France
- CA: Pays Basque
- Capital: Mauléon-Licharre (Maule-Lextarre)

Area
  - Total: 785 km^{2} (303 sq mi)

Population (2012)
  - Total: 17,018
  - Density: 21.7/km^{2} (56.1/sq mi)
- Time zone: UTC+1 (CET)
  - Summer (DST): UTC+2 (CEST)

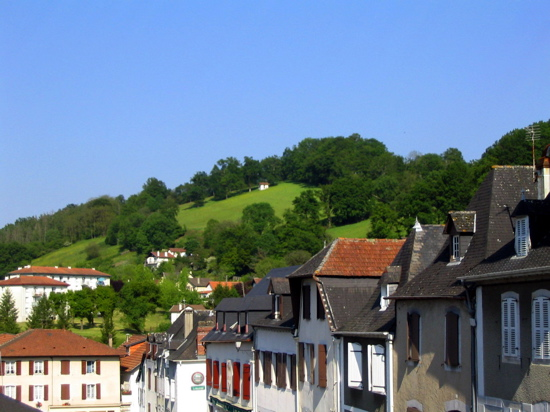
Mauléon, capital of Soule

Soule (French pronunciation: [sul]; Basque: Zuberoa; Zuberoan/ Soule Basque: Xiberoa or Xiberua; Occitan: Sola) is a former viscounty and French province and part of the present-day Pyrénées-Atlantiques département. It is divided into two cantons of the arrondissement (district) of Oloron-Sainte-Marie (Mauleon-Licharre and Tardets-Sorholus), and a part of the canton of Saint Palais (arrondissement of Bayonne).

Its provincial capital is Mauléon, which combined with Licharre in 1841 to form "Mauléon-Licharre", but today is often known as "Mauléon-Soule". Historically, Soule is the smallest province of the Basque Country (785 km^{2}; 303 sq. mi.). Its population has been decreasing (23,803 in 1901; 16,006 in 1990; 15,535 in 1999).

== Etymology ==
The territory is named Xiberoa in Souletin Basque, Zuberoa in standard Basque, Sola in Gascon and Soule in French; all of them derivate from Subola, the previous name of the region attested for the first time in the year 635 in the diaries of a Franco-Burgundian expedition led by Duke Arnebert against the Basques. Subola comes from the name the Romans gave to the Aquitani tribe that inhabited the region by the time of their arrival, the Suburates, also called Sibusates by Julius Caesar in his Commentarii de Bello Gallico and Sybillates by Pliny the Elder.

== History ==
Soule has been continuously inhabited since the last glaciation. There are several deposits from the Neolithic as well as fifteen protohistoric settlements. The first text written in Soule dates from the 7th century.

=== Ancient Soule ===
The territory was already inhabited in the Middle Paleolithic; Neanderthal prehistoric settlements have been found in the caves of Xaxixiloaga in Aussurucq and Etxeberri. At the end of the Neolithic the population had extended and assimilated knowledge from other peoples. There are protohistoric settlements that show a simple material life and a lifestyle dominated by migration. Remains of coins and other monetary artifacts have been found, proving the existence of an exchange economy in Soule, which very likely worked as an access point between Aquitaine—Novempopulania—in the north and the southern side of the Pyrenees.

At the time of the Roman arrival in the 1st century, Soule was inhabited by an Aquitani tribe named Suburates, who spoke the Aquitanian language (a form of Proto-Basque). As with other peoples in Aquitaine, the Romans had some influence in the territory, although Soule kept its language and culture and was relatively unimportant during the times of the Roman Empire, due to its isolation. The only evidence of Roman influence in Soule exists in the chapelle of the Madeleine, in Tardets.

Soule is first mentioned as a territory in a text from the 7th Century. In 636 (or 635) the Frankish army led by the Duke Arembert was ambushed and defeated by the Basques in a place named "vallis subola". This valley is then included in the territory of the "Wascones" (Duchy of Vasconia), which included intermittently lands to either side of the western and central Pyrenees. It was later referred to as Gascony.

=== Middle Ages ===
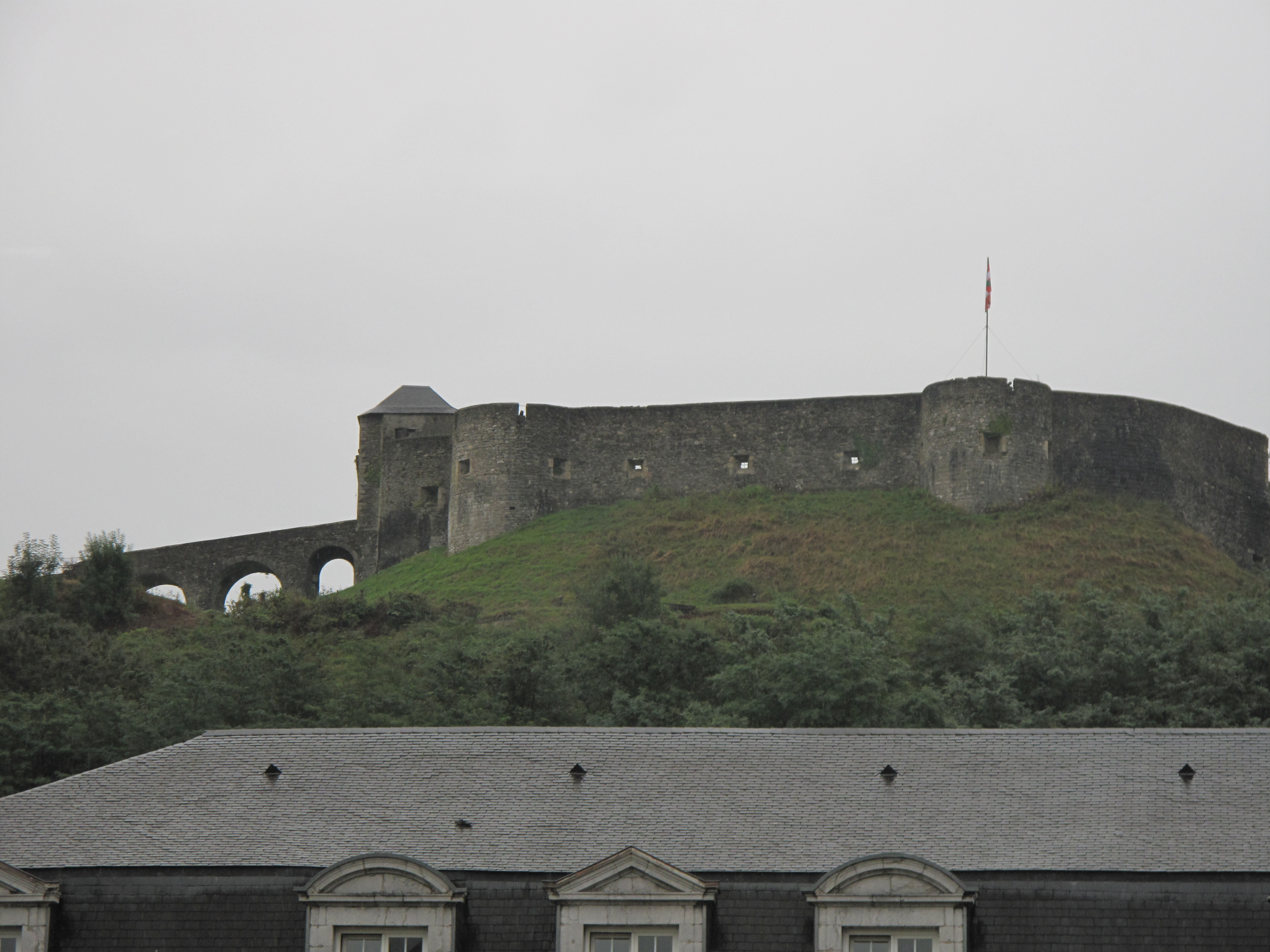
The fort of Mauléon.

The region of Soule may have developed a primeval political structure before the 11th century with a strong influence from the Kingdom of Pamplona, established in 824. However, it would be in 1023 when Sancho VI Duke of Gascony would name Guillaume Fort as first Viscount of Soule. His descendants would inherit the title for around two centuries. The Viscounts of Soule had their base in the fortress of Mauléon, a strategic region that controlled the pass from Aquitaine to the Iberian Peninsula. The viscounts of Soule took advantage of their territory. Despite being small in size, it held a strategic position between the Kingdom of Navarre to the south and the Duchy of Aquitaine to the north.

In 1152, Eleanor of Aquitaine married Henry II of England, and thus the Duchy of Aquitaine joined the Crown of England. In 1261, after ten years of conflict, the last viscount of Soule, Auger III, surrendered the castle of Mauléon to Edward I of England, and as a result the territory of Soule was administered by the crown of England. At this time the current network of roads between the Souletin villages was constructed.

==== Soule under English rule ====
The English Soule was under the direct authority of the Duke of Aquitaine, who was also the King of England. Control over the territory was delegated to a lord, who kept the castle of Mauléon and collected the taxes. The lord of Soule had fourteen captains, of whom only one was English, the rest being either locally-born or Gascons. The ex-viscount Auger III allied with the Kingdom of Navarre, and taking advantage of the war between Philip IV, king of Navarre, and Edward I of England, retook his fortress at Mauléon in 1295, but he was forced to hand it back after Aquitaine was formally declared English in 1303.

The Hundred Years' War kept Soule isolated from the exterior for many years. Finally, in 1449, an army led by Gaston IV, the Count of Foix and Viscount of Béarn, took possession of the castle in the name of the French king ending the English presence in Soule.

=== Modern Period ===
==== Soule under French rule ====
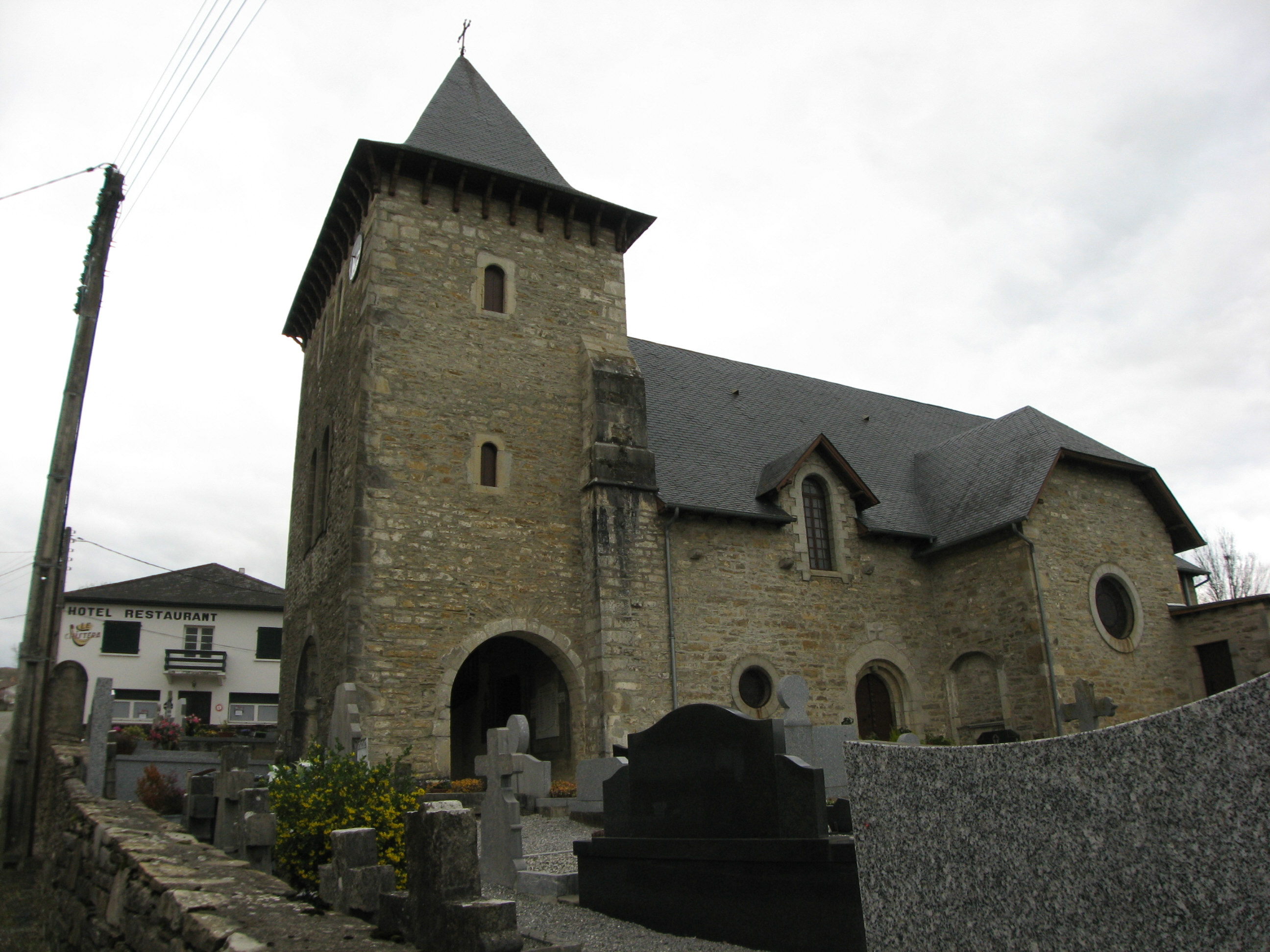
Church of Muskildi

In the mid 15th century, Soule finally recognizes the King of France as its own, with the Basque district becoming the smallest province and exclave of the kingdom and the most distant from the centre of power, Paris. It came to be surrounded by the sovereign Kingdom of Navarre on the south and west and the independent principality of Viscounty of Béarn on the east. In 1511, King Francis I of France urged the Souletins to set down their institutional and legal framework on paper, which they did in Bearnese, the administrative written language up to that point. In 1539, an amendment to their region specific laws went on to be written in French, the new official language as decreed by King Francis I. Despite numbering more than fifty towns and villages, Soule was populated by fewer than 4,000 people. The only town was Mauléon, with a population totalling fewer than 350 people. As of 1512, given its proximity to France and its particular geographic situation surrounded by the Kingdom of Navarre-Bearn and the recently invaded Navarre to the south, Soule became ensnared in the political, religious and military manoeuvres derived from its shaky position, with the French Wars of Religion affecting the province tremendously.

==== The end of home rule ====
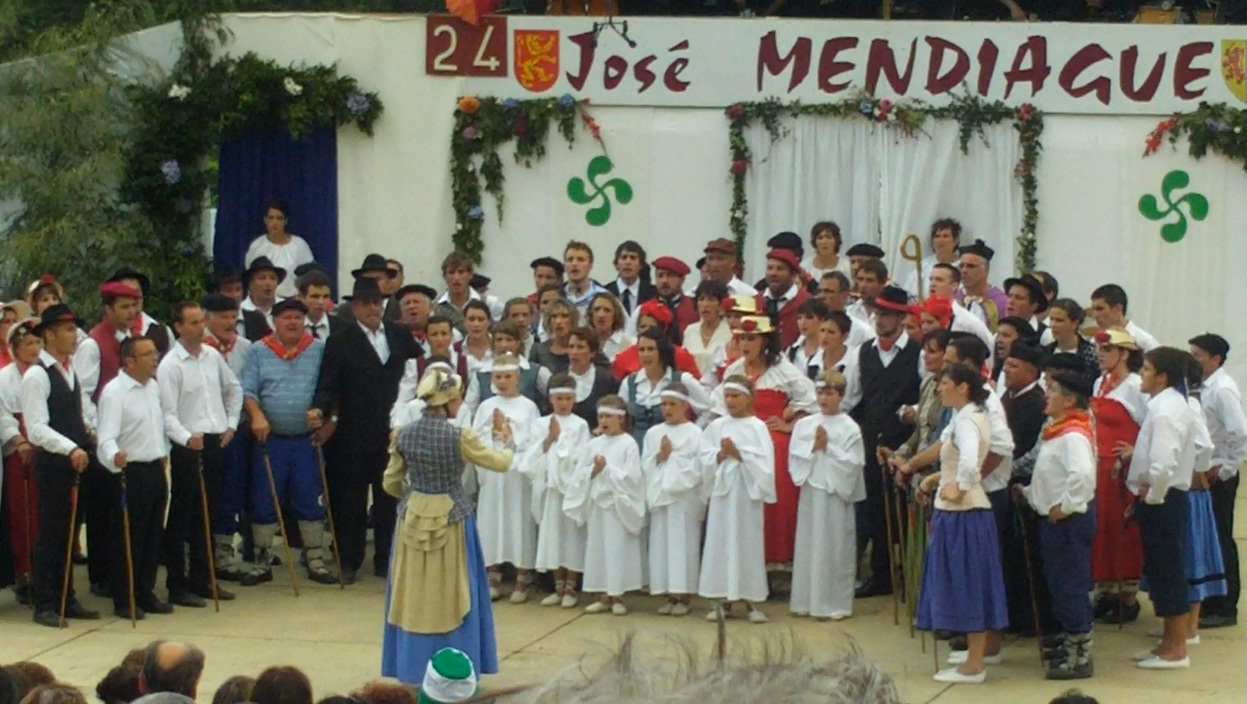
The pastoral of Soule sinks its roots in the Middle Ages

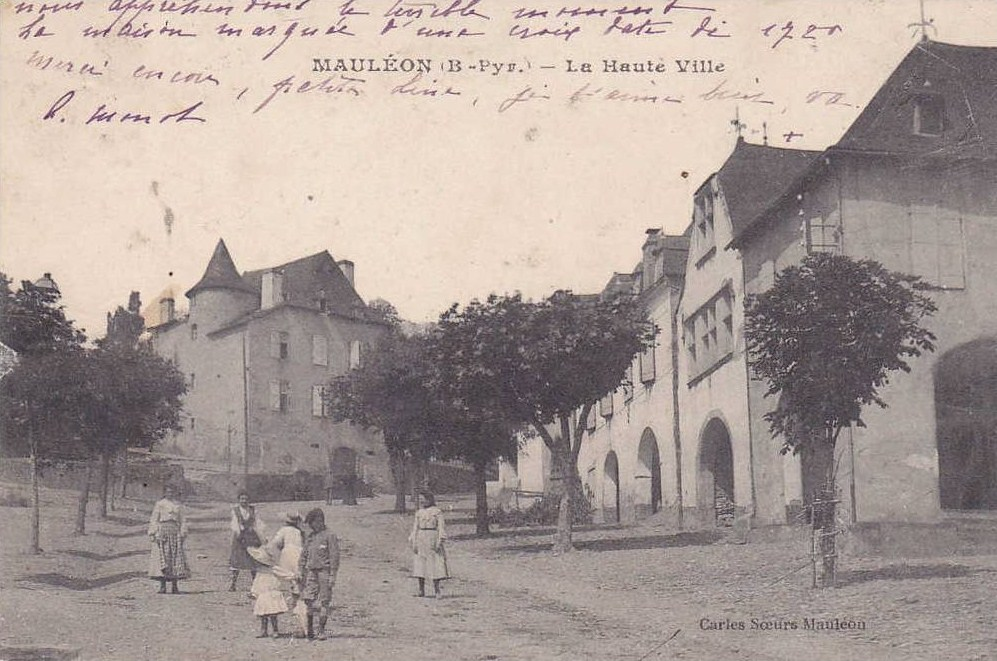
Bela Street in Mauléon (1910)

The province of Soule relied largely on the commons set on the highlands and lowlands of the valley for the use of local farmers and shepherds. However, they were also coveted by local and alien lords with estate grants on Soule. By the mid 17th century and in the context of the Treaty of the Pyrenees, anger spread like fire among common Souletins at the aristocracy's takeover of lands and the curtailment of their legal and institutional sovereignty. In 1661, a widespread rebellion erupted led by the priest Bernard Goihenetche 'Matalaz', but was harshly suppressed by an army sent over from Gascony.

Still Soule managed to retain many native laws and institutions, with its representatives attending the Parliament of Navarre and Béarn (six deputies, two for each estate). The representatives of Soule in the National Constituent Assembly held in Paris (August 1789) voted against the suppression of the French provinces and the establishment of a new administrative arrangement that wiped out the existence of their native order, giving way to the départément system.

Attempts by the Basque deputies in Paris to create a Basque department failed, their districts merged with Béarn among protests of the Basque representatives, and even Soule was divided into two cantons. After the end of the First Carlist War in Spain and the relocation of customs to the Pyrenees from the Ebro (1841), trade with Navarre collapsed. In the late 19th century, the establishment of espadrille factories in Mauleón made up for the decay of economic life and emigration, with a number of inhabitants in Navarre and Aragón pouring in and being recruited on the workforce.

== Geography ==
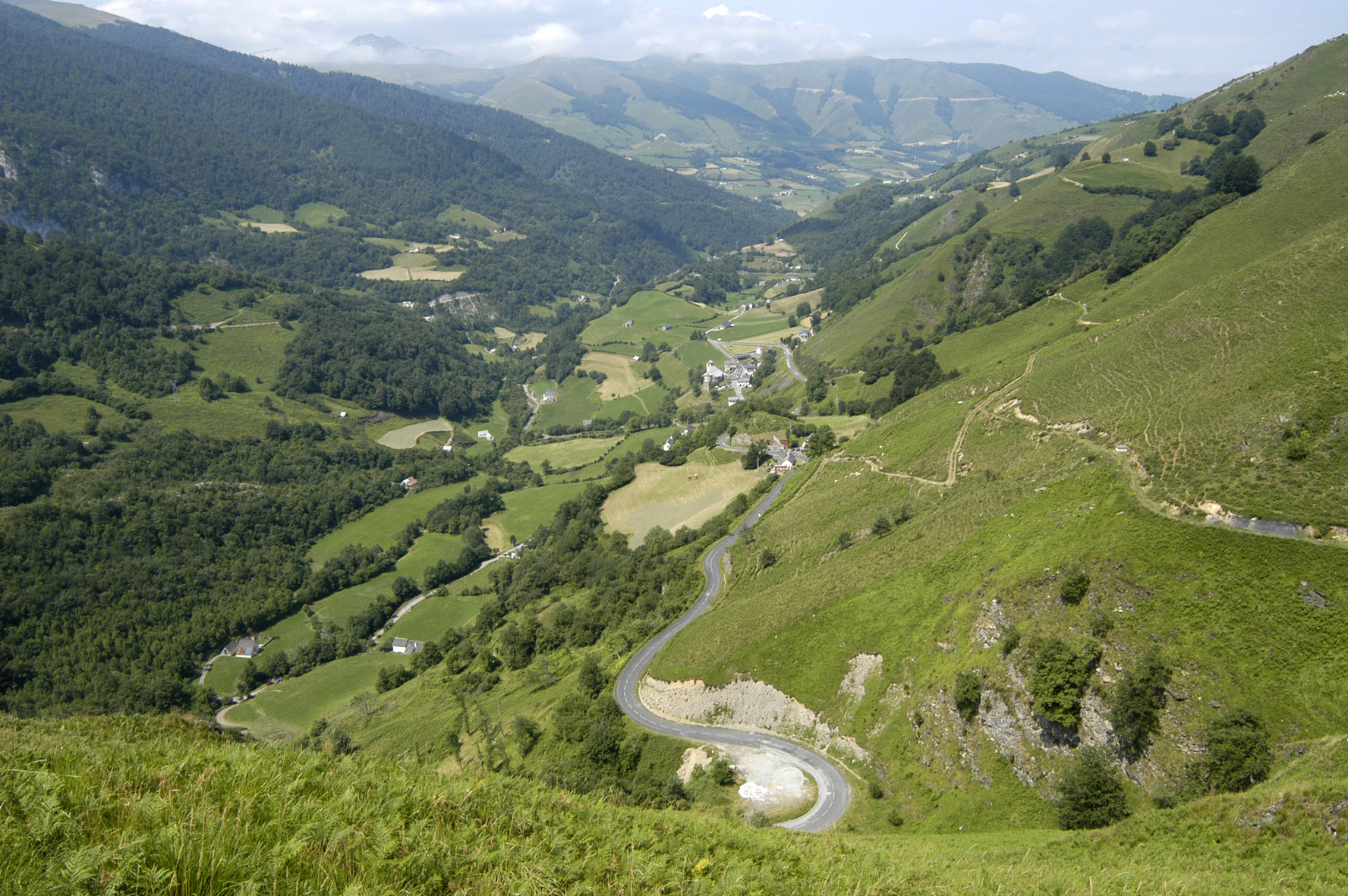
Soule is a very mountainous territory.

Soule is located in the northern basin of the western Pyrenees, and is the smallest of the Basque region. It is surrounded by Lower Navarre on the west, Navarre on the south, Béarn on the east and north. Along with Labourd and Lower Navarre, it forms the Northern Basque Country, also known as French Basque Country or Pays basque. Its entire territory extends around the axis provided by the river Saison, known in Basque as Uhaitza, that flows from south to north until it joins the river Oloron, that works as a border between Soule and Béarn.

Soule includes three geographical regions: the lowlands at north on a territory known as Pettara or Lower Soule, a forest region known as Arbaila and the highlands at south, in a region named Basabürüa with a highest peak at 2,017 meters (6,617 feet) at the Pic d'Orhy.

=== Orography ===
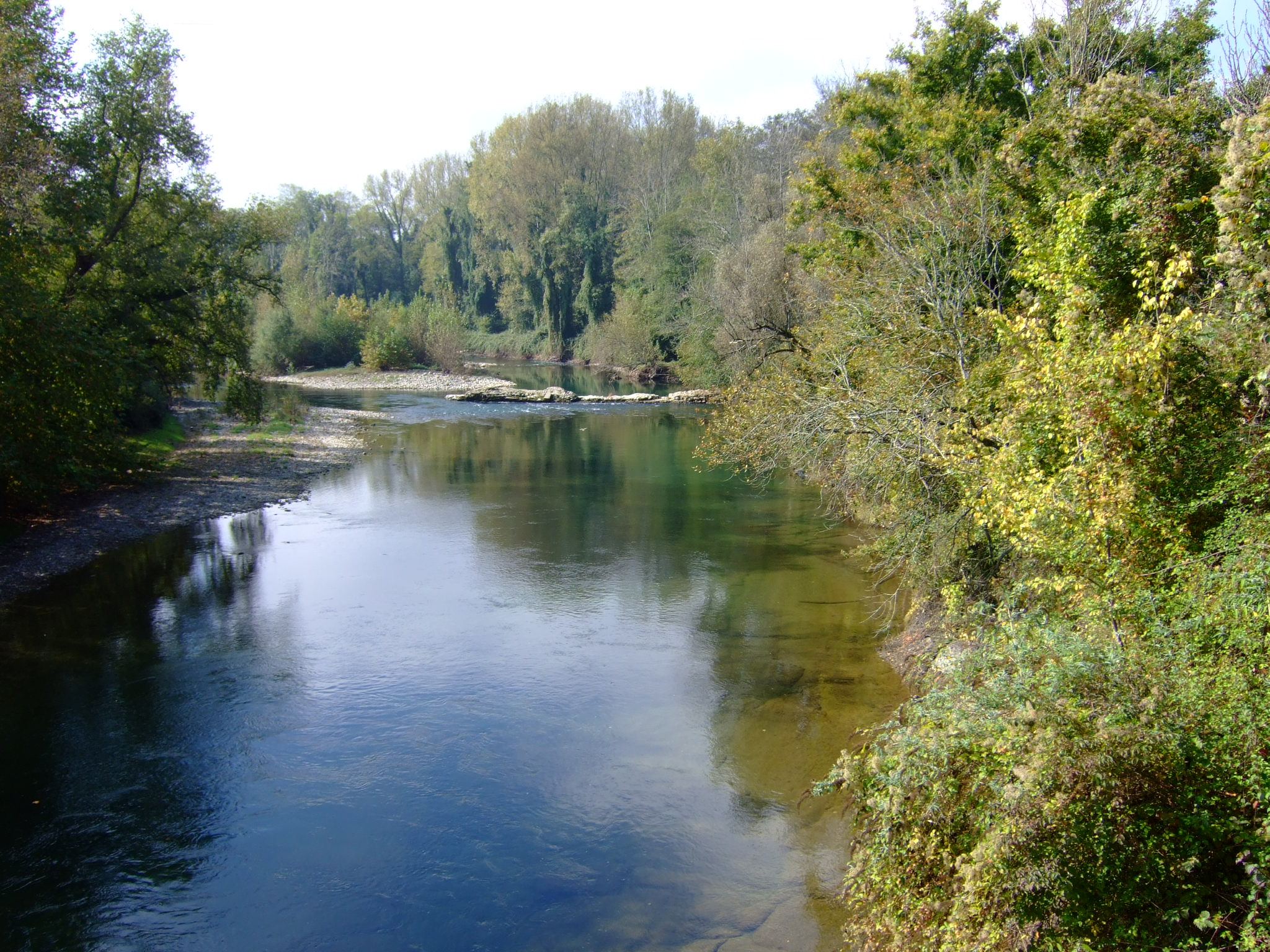
The river Saison or Ühaitza.

Soule's orography divides into three regions: the northern lowlands, made up by extensive plains; the central region, which is fairly hilly and the southern highlands, which are part of the northwestern Pyrenees, with altitudes reaching up to 2,017 meters (6,617 feet) above sea level at the Pic d'Orhy.

In the Pyrenees, from west to east, the first peak is the Pic d'Orhy, above 2,000 meters (6,600 feet) and the fourth highest peak in the Basque Country after Iror Errege Maia and Euzkarre among others, all of them in Navarre. Also in the highlands are located the Otsogorrigaina (1,922 metres (6,306 feet) and Sardekagaina (1,893 metres (6,211 feet), which are the second and third highest mountains in Soule. In total, there exist more than 20 peaks higher than 1,000 metres (3,300 feet).

=== Hydrography ===
The river Saison (known as Ühaitza in Souletin Basque) is the main river of Soule. It is 60 km (37 mi) long and originates at Licq, in the highlands region. Smaller rivers rising at the Pyrenees join the Saison before it converges with the river Oloron, together flowing into the river Adour.

=== Climate ===
The oceanic climate of Soule is generally warm and humid. The highlands and Pyrenees experience an alpine climate.

== Demography ==
Soule is the province with the lowest population density of the Northern Basque Country, with 17 people per square kilometer (44 people/mi^{2}). Soule has experienced a significant population decline since the 19th century; many people have emigrated to larger cities and regions outside the province, such as Labourd, Béarn and Paris. In the last century, Soule has lost more than three quarters of its population, which has caused the need for different municipalities to be merged in order to assure the maintenance of public services.

=== Largest cities ===
Most populated communes
Position	Name	Inhabitants
1st	Mauléon-Licharre (Maule-Lextarre)	3,347
2nd	Chéraute (Sohüta)	1,104
3rd	Barcus (Barkoxe)	774
4th	Viodos-Abense-de-Bas (Bildoze-Onizepea)	743
5th	Tardets-Sorholus (Atharratze-Sorholüze)	590

== Administrative divisions ==
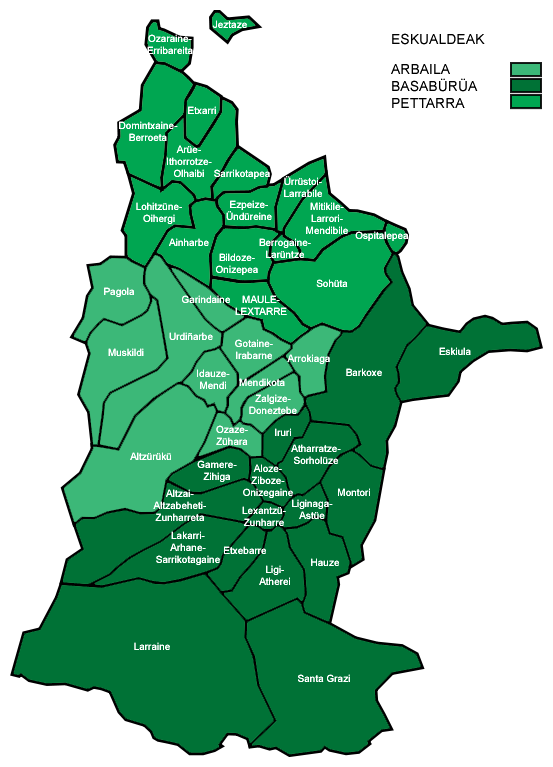
Traditional regions of Soule.

Traditionally, Soule has been divided into three geographical regions, each of which group a determinate number of municipalities or communes.

- Pettarra, comprising the lower Soule, in the north. It includes the towns and villages of Ainharp, Aroue-Ithorots-Olhaïby, Berrogain-Laruns, Domezain-Berraute, Espès-Undurein, Etcharry, Gestas, L'Hôpital-Saint-Blaise, Lohitzun-Oyhercq, Mauléon-Licharre, Moncayolle-Larrory-Mendibieu, Osserain-Rivareyte, Viodos-Abense-de-Bas.
- Arbaila, in the mid-lands. It is divided into two regions: Arbaila Txipia ("small Arbaila") and Arbaila Handia ("big Arbaila"). It includes the towns and villages of Aussurucq, Garindein, Gotein-Libarrenx, Idaux-Mendy, Menditte, Musculdy, Ordiarp, Ossas-Suhare, Pagolle, Roquiague, Sauguis-Saint-Étienne.
- Basabürua, comprising the highlands and Pyrenees. It is divided into two regions: Ibarresküin ("the right valley") and Ibarrezker ("the left valley"). It includes the towns and villages of Alçay-Alçabéhéty-Sunharette, Alos-Sibas-Abense, Barcus, Camou-Cihigue, Esquiule, Etchebar, Haux, Lacarry-Arhan-Charritte-de-Haut, Laguinge-Restoue, Larrau, Lichans-Sunhar, Licq-Athérey, Montory, Sainte-Engrâce, Tardets-Sorholus, Trois-Villes.

For administrative purposes, the communes of Soule are grouped into four cantons; the canton of Mauléon-Licharre, that includes 19 communes; the canton of Tardets-Sorholus, that includes 16 communes; the canton of Saint-Palais and the canton of Oloron.

== Culture ==
After decades of emigration and demographic, social and cultural decay, the territory is showing a strong determination to recover the lost vitality of centuries ago. Assorted cultural events linked to old traditions bear witness to that dynamism.

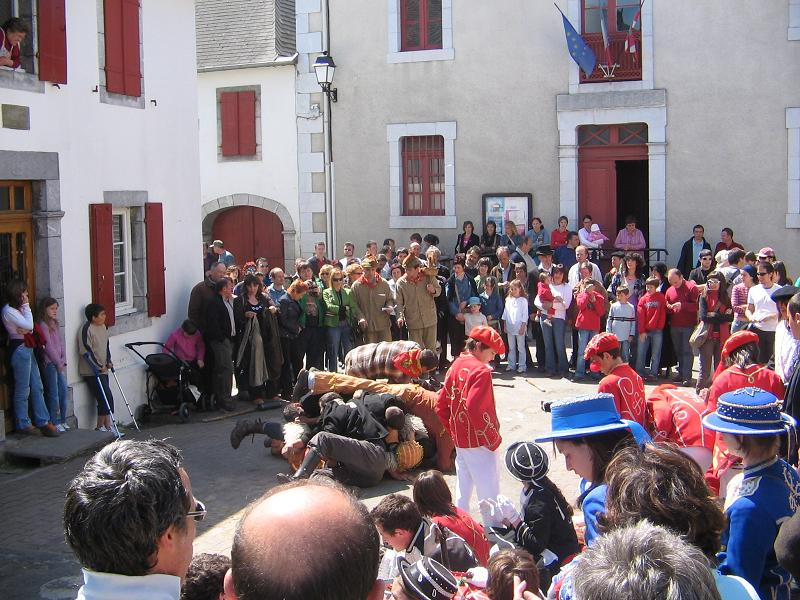
Maskarada actors in a melée

There is a tradition of folk musical theatre, the pastoral: the inhabitants of a village spend the year preparing and rehearsing the play and its dances. Traditionally, the subject of the play was Catholic, but recently pieces of Basque history are also presented. Another event akin to the pastoral beloved of the people of Soule is the maskaradas. This theatrical performances are put on in many villages of Soule in carnival time through spring. Each year a specific village takes the responsibility of arranging a new performance. It consists of a music band in due carnival outfit surrounded with a group of set carnivalesque characters and dancers parading up and down the main street of the host village; at the end, they stage an informal play usually in the market place or handball court.

Soule is also renowned for its singing tradition, elegant dances and local music instruments, such as xirula and ttun-ttun. These instruments are gaining new dynamism thanks to music schools founded to that end by local cultural activists.

=== Language ===
Soule's own language has been Basque for centuries, with the region featuring its own Souletin dialect. At the same time, the neighbouring Béarnais (Gascon) has been widely understood, and in recent centuries even spoken as a lingua franca. However, both Basque and Béarnais have lost ground to French with both languages struggling to survive into the next generation. Basque is attested to have been widespread farther east of the territory into the Pyrenees in previous centuries.

The inhabitants call non-Basque speaking foreigners Kaskoinak, while other Basque speaking people (especially when referring to those of the French Basque Country) are dubbed Manexak after a commonplace sheep breed in the area.
