= Sorkun =

Basque singer

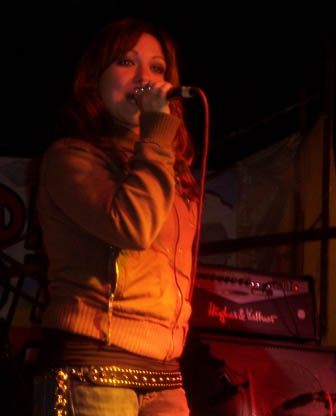
- Sorkun in the Kontrafiestas of Vallecas

Background information
- Born: Sorkunde Rubio Ansotegui; Basque Country
- Genres: Rock; pop; jazz; drum and bass; punk
- Occupation: Singer
- Instrument: Voice
- Years active: 1995–present
- Labels: Esan Ozenki; Metak
- Formerly of: Kashbad

Sorkun (born Sorkunde Rubio Antotegui) is a Basque singer. She has recorded two solo albums, and formed part of the punk-rock band Kashbad during the 90s. She has also recorded with other groups such as Negu Gorriak and Flitter, and has collaborated with Fermin Muguruza.

She began by singing in Kashbad, although the band was already formed when she got involved and were looking for a female vocalist. After recording their first demo, she was heard by Fermin Muguruza who was amazed by her voice. He suggested to her that they record the vocals for the Negu Gorriak song Nire Baitan Daude Biak (Both are inside me), which appeared on the album Ideia Zabaldu (To Expand The Idea) (Esan Ozenki, 1995). Afterwards, the group was persuaded to play in the Festival Hitz Egin along with bertsolaris and bands like Su Ta Gar, Ama Say, Nación Reixa and Negu Gorriak themselves. Later they recorded three records for the label Esan Ozenki (Kashbad, 1996; Distantzia, 1997 y Hesiak, 1999). The group then separated and each of the members went their separate way.

In 1999, Fermin Muguruza released his first solo work Brigadistak Sound System. Although Sorkun hadn't worked with him in the recording, she was chosen by Fermin as one of the backing singers for the band when making live performances. She did a world tour with the group through the next two years in different directions becoming familiar with most of Europe, Los Angeles and San Francisco (in the United States), Japan and Quebec.

In 2001, the band split up and Sorkun started to thinking about her first solo recording. It was Onna (Metak, 2002). The band on the album is made up of Kanda (the guitarist with Neubat), Atxus (bass player also from Neubat, Iker (synthesisers) and Home (the drummer from Exale). The album was recorded in the Garate Studios (in Andoain, property of Kaki Arkarazo) with Karlos Osinaga (the ex-bassist from Kashbad and member of Lisabö) and Haritz Harreguy (from the group Sen).

== Discography ==
=== Solo albums ===
- Onna (Metak, 2002). CD.
- Duna (Kontrakalea-Metak, 2005). CD.
- Sorkun & Vice Presidentes (PIAS 2008). CD

=== Collaborations ===
- "Gizaki hauskorra" in Metak. 2001–2003 (Metak, 2003). CD.
- "Pistola aluan" in Basque Planet (Wagram, 2004). CD.
- "Hator" in Gure Irratia (Gure Irratia-Gara, 2005). CD.

=== With Kashbad ===
- Kashbad (Esan Ozenki, 1996). CD.
- Distantzia (Esan Ozenki, 1997). CD.
- Hesiak (Esan Ozenki, 1999). CD.

=== Videos ===
- "Lurra" (2002).
- "Heldu nazazu" (2005).
- "Goiz zen" (2008).
