= FM 99.00 Dub Manifest =

Studio album by Fermin Muguruza
- Released: 2000
- Recorded: 2000
- Genre: Ska
- Length: ??:??
- Label: Esan Ozenki
- Producer: Unknown

Fermin Muguruza chronology
erREMIXak (1999)	FM 99.00 Dub Manifest (2000)	Korrika (2001)

FM 99.00 Dub Manifest is a studio album from Basque artist Fermin Muguruza. It was released in 2000 and produced by Esan Ozenki.

Muguruza doesn't belong to any musical genre in particular but some punk, ska, jazz, jungle and funk influences can be found. Most songs contain political themes, with some promoting internationalism and social justice. Gizon Armatuak is about death squads in Central American countries, Big Benat denounces globalisation and uniformisation, while in Mendebaldarketa Muguruza laments on the situation of immigrants. In Diru Espainol Zikina he ridicules the appearance of murderous historical figures such as Hernán Cortés, Pizarro and Christopher Columbus on paper money, arguing it represents the arrogance and imperialism of the Spanish government.

PopMatters noted about the album in its review, "This album isn’t going to change the world, and no, it’s not going to rule the charts either. But it’s a really good 51 minutes of music by someone who could be a star down the line."

== Track listing ==
1. "FM 99.00 Dub Manifest"
2. "Ekhi Eder" (Beautiful Sun)
3. "Bere-Bar" (Berber-Bar) - with Zebda
4. "Itaka Berriro" (Itaca, again)
5. "Gizon Armatuak" (Men With Guns)
6. "Big Benat"
7. "Mendebaldarketa" (Westernisation)
8. "Diru Espainol Zikina" (Dirty Spanish Money)
9. "Radical Chic"
10. "Irudikeriak" (Delusions)
