= Sorkun (disambiguation) =

Sorkun can refer to:

- Sorkun
- Sorkun, Gölhisar
- Sorkun, İskilip
