= Aussurucq =

- Commune
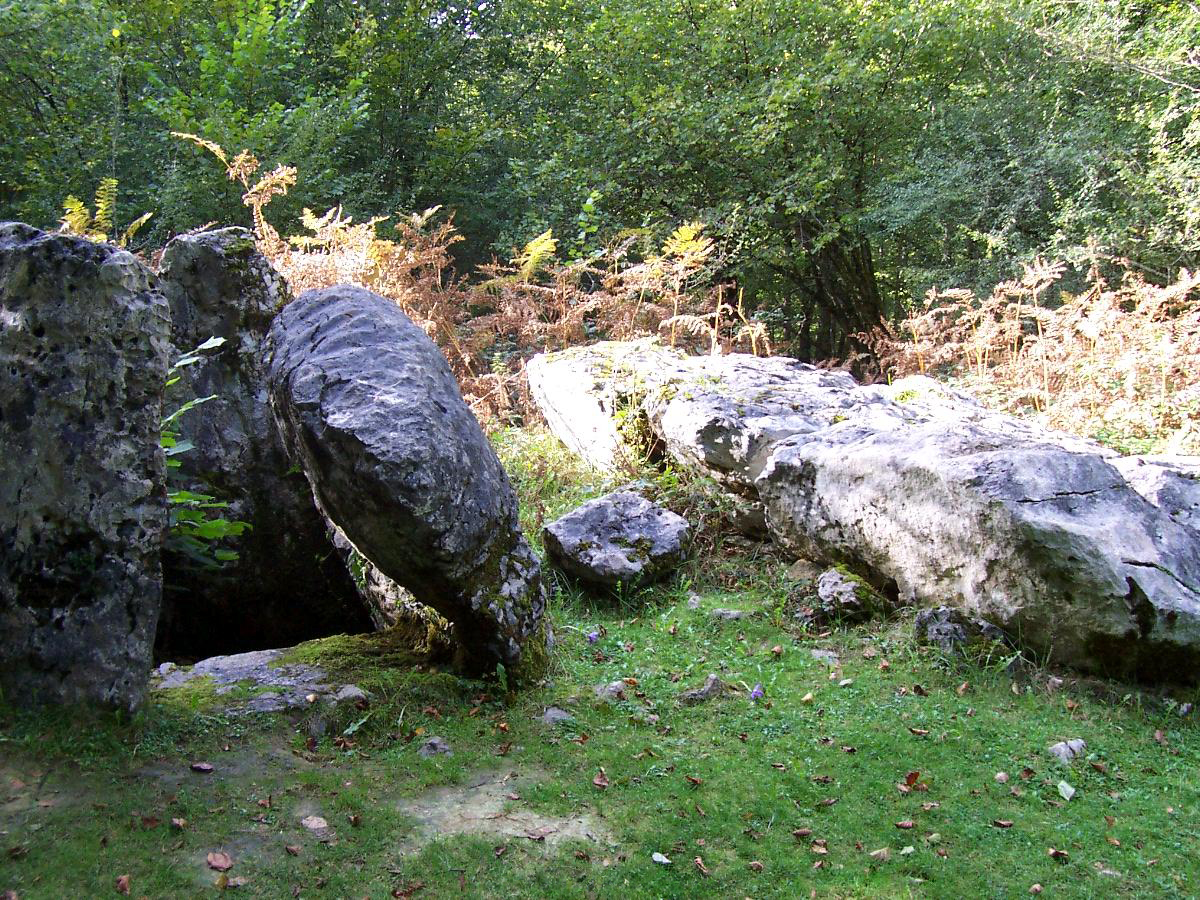
- Dolmen in the Arbailles Forest
- Location of Aussurucq
- Location within France Location within Nouvelle-Aquitaine
- Coordinates: 43°09′01″N 0°55′57″W
- Country: France
- Region: Nouvelle-Aquitaine
- Department: Pyrénées-Atlantiques
- Arrondissement: Oloron-Sainte-Marie
- Canton: Montagne Basque
- Intercommunality: CA Pays Basque

Government
  - Mayor (2020–2026): Jean-Marie Queheille
- Area^{1}: 47.12 km^{2} (18.19 sq mi)
- Elevation: 209 m (686 ft)
- Highest elevation: 1,284 m (4,213 ft)
- Lowest elevation: 191 m (627 ft)
- Population (2023): 230
  - Density: 4.9/km^{2} (13/sq mi)
- Time zone: UTC+01:00 (CET)
  - Summer (DST): UTC+02:00 (CEST)
- INSEE/Postal code: 64081 /64130
- ^{1} French Land Register data, which excludes lakes, ponds, glaciers > 1 km^{2} (0.386 sq mi or 247 acres) and river estuaries.

Aussurucq (French pronunciation: [osyʁyk]; Basque: Altzürükü) is a commune in the Pyrénées-Atlantiques department in the Nouvelle-Aquitaine region of south-western France.

The inhabitants are known as Altzürükütar.

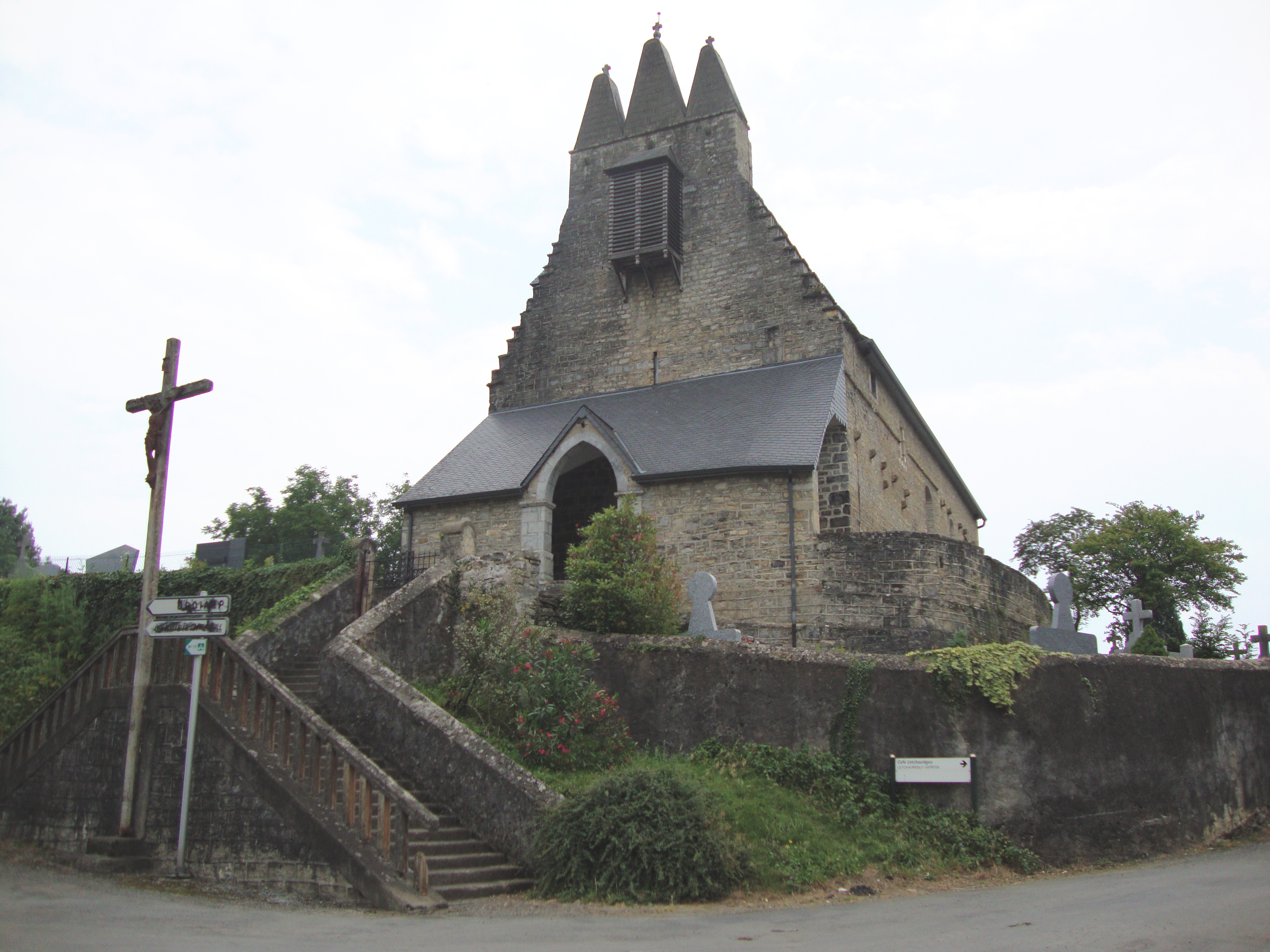
The church with its Trinitarian steeple, facade, and steps

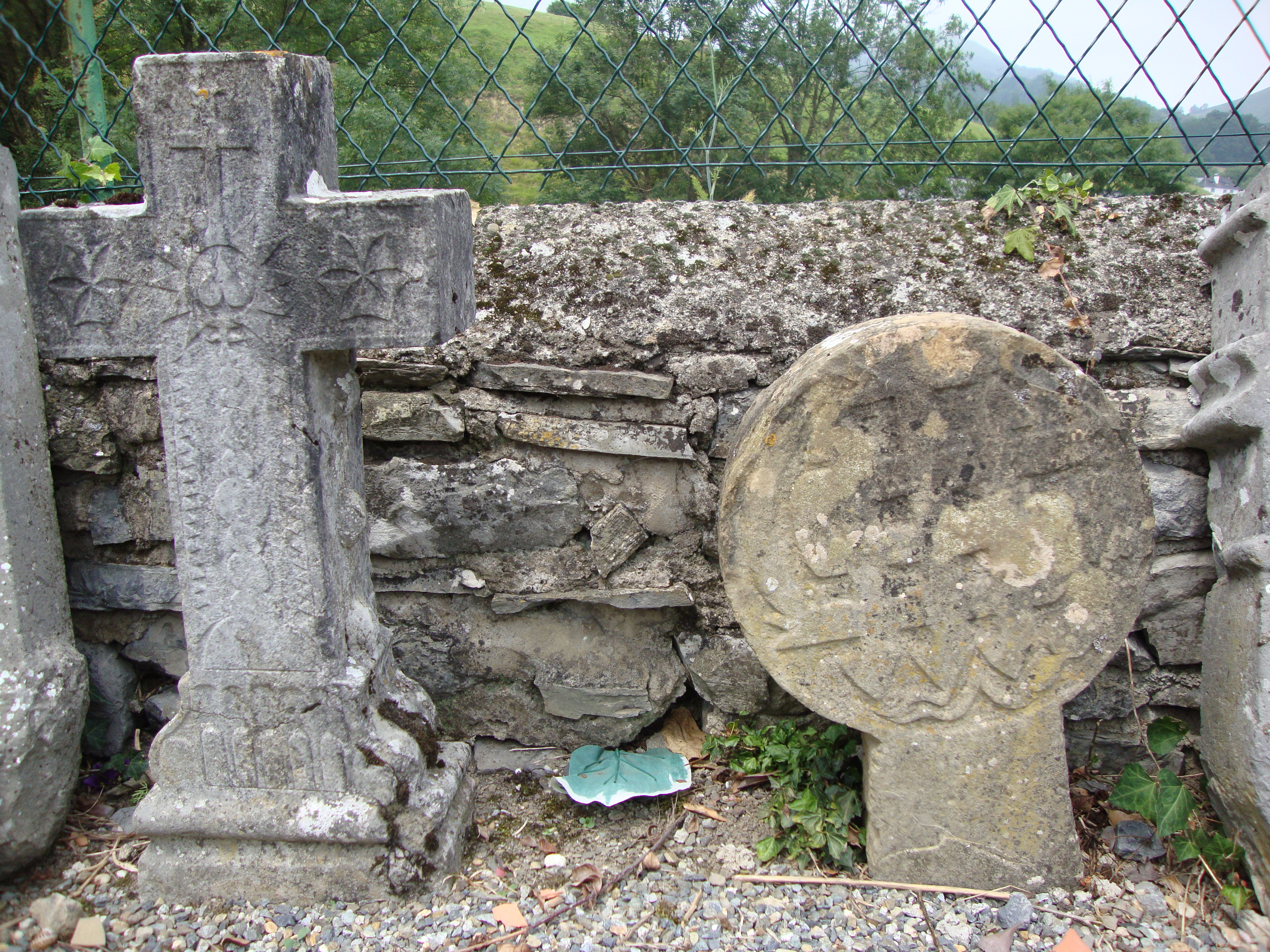
Hilarri

== Geography ==
Aussurucq is located in the former province of Soule in the Massif des Arbailles some 30 km west by south-west of Oloron-Sainte-Marie and 25 km east of Saint-Jean-Pied-de-Port. Access to the commune is by road D147 from Idaux-Mendy in the north which passes through the village and continues south through the commune to join the D117 on the southern border of the commune. A pastoral road from Béhorléguy to Alçay and Aussurucq passes through the Col d'Aphanize (without crossing it) and generally follows the line of the watershed along the Col de Burdin Olatzé. The commune is mostly rugged and heavily forested however there is some farmland in the north.

The Ruisseau de Guessalia rises in the south of the commune and flows north-east gathering some tributaries to join the Apouhoura north of the commune. The Arangorena forms the north-western border as it flows north-east to join the Saison near Gotein-Libarrenx. The Bidouze rises in the south of the commune and flows north to eventually join the Adour north of Bardos.

=== Places and Hamlets ===
- Abeheaborda
- Ahancetaborda
- Ahanzolha
- Ahusquy: known for its spring of the same name
- Althabéa (ruins)
- Althabegoïty
- Ambukoborda
- Ardiaénéa
- Ascune (rocks)
- Athekaketa
- Bagadoy
- Barnexborda
- Baskinabe
- Behegayborda
- Beherégaray (barns)
- Burdin-Clatze (col)
- Capara (barn)
- Carriquiborda
- Chalunia
- Cumba
- Elsareko Ordokia
- Erbinia (cayolar)
- Etchakokoua
- Etchaltia (rocks)
- Etchebidea
- Etchecopar
- Etchekolaz
- Exaltia (cayolar)
- Gettaborda
- Goyheneix
- Guessalia
- Harribiribile
- Hasgagnia
- Haspia (rocks)
- Héguilloré (cayolar)
- Hidogaratia (col)
- Hidondo
- Ibarrondoa
- Ihatia
- Inharpu (col)
- Istaurdy (cayolar)
- Jaguiborda
- Jaragoyhen
- Karkatz
- Lagay
- Lapistoy
- Lapitz (field)
- Larraguy
- Larramendy
- Latchéra
- Lecharegaratia (cayolar)
- Lecharéguibela (cayolar)
- Leycharzepia (fountain)
- Lhastéria
- Lohiolha
- Lucugnébehety (cayolar)
- Miadore (cayolar)
- Mouchako
- Naboleguy (cayolar)
- Nébélé (fountain)
- Nékolha
- Olhatzezarre (cayolar)
- Otxolatzé (fontaine)
- Potcho (cayolars)
- Sallaberria
- Sorzauqui (col)
- Souhourtia (cayolar)
- Thartassu
- Udoya (cayolar)
- Uhalberryborda
- Uhaldéa
- Uhaltéberria
- Uhartéa
- Urrutchoya
- Urrutia (château)
- Uthurbietta (fountain)
- Uthurieta (cayolar)
- Zouhourtia

== Toponymy ==
The commune name in basque is Altzürükü.

Jean-Baptiste Orpustan indicated that the name comes from the basque altzu ("alder tree") which is explained by the position of the valley covered in alder trees. The second part of the name is more enigmatic. According to Orpustan it could be from Urru ("the other side") or iri giving alzu-(i) ri-ku meaning "place in the Alder field".

The following table details the origins of the commune name and other names in the commune.

Name	Spelling	Date	Source	Page	Origin	Description
Aussurucq	Auçuruc	1189	Orpustan			Village
	Auzuruc	1337	Orpustan			
	Aussuruc	1385	Raymond	17	Duchesne	
	Aussuruc	1412	Raymond	17	Notaries	
	Ausuruc	1454	Raymond	17	Not stated	
	Sent-Martin d'Auçuruc, Auserucus	1471	Raymond	17	Chapter	
	Ausuruc	1520	Orpustan			
	Dassurucq	1690	Orpustan			
	Ausuruc	1690	Orpustan			
	Aussurucq	1690	Orpustan			
La fontaine d'Ahusquy	La fontaine d'Ahusquy	1863	Raymond	3		Fountain
Arabéhère	Arabéhère	1520	Raymond	7	Soule	Farm
Aran	Aran	1520	Raymond	7	Soule	Farm
Arhanset	Arhanset	1520	Raymond	10	Soule	Farm
Ariadar	Ariadar	1520	Raymond	10	Soule	Farm
Arsusqui	Arsusqui	1520	Raymond	13	Soule	Farm
Béherégaray	Béherégaray	1520	Raymond	26	Soule	Farm
Carrica	Carrica	1520	Raymond	42	Soule	Farm
Carricart	Carricart	1520	Raymond	42	Soule	Farm
Carriquiri	Carriquiri	1520	Raymond	42	Soule	Farm (possibly the current Carriquiborda Farm)
Goyen	Goyen	1520	Raymond	73	Soule	Farm
Goyti	Goyti	1520	Raymond	73	Soule	Farm
Iribarne	Iribarne	1520	Raymond	83	Soule	Farm
Lapistoy	Lapitztoy	1520	Raymond	93	Soule	Farm
Mendiburu	Mendiburu	1520	Raymond	111	Soule	Farm
Nécol	Nécol	1520	Raymond	122	Soule	Farm (possibly the current Nékolha Farm)
Sagarspe	Sagarspe	1520	Raymond	145	Soule	Farm
Urruchoro	Urruchoro	1520	Raymond	171	Soule	Farm
Burunolatxé	Burunolatxé	1863	Raymond	37		A Col between Alçay-Alçabéhéty-Sunharette and Aussurucq
Escuné	Escuné	1863	Raymond	60		Forest

Sources:

- Orpustan: Jean-Baptiste Orpustan, New Basque Toponymy
- Raymond: Topographic Dictionary of the Department of Basses-Pyrenees, 1863, on the page numbers indicated in the table. (in French)

Origins:

- Duchesne: Duchesne collection volume CXIV
- Notaries: Notaries of Navarrenx
- Chapter: Titles of the Chapter of Bayonne
- Soule: Customs of Soule

== History ==
In the Middle Palaeolithic era Soule was already populated as remains of Neanderthal prehistoric man have been found in the Xaxixiloaga caves in Aussurucq. A tumulus was also reported at shepherd's cabins in Potxo along the D147 road.

The central part of Soule is also called the Messagerie des Arbailles between Basabürü and Pettarra (in the Sauguis-Saint-Étienne, Aussurucq, and Barcus regions).

== Administration ==
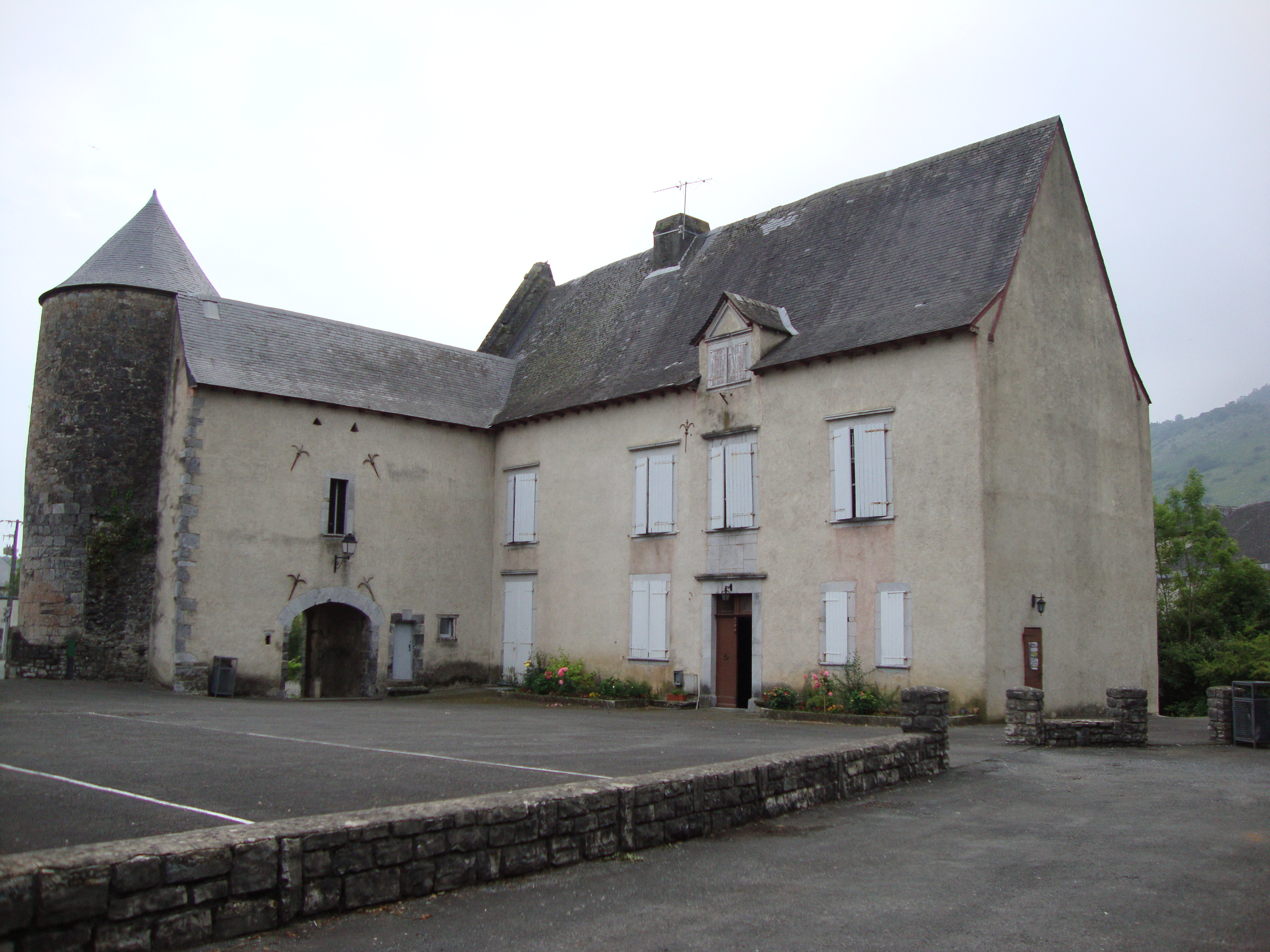
The Town Hall in the chateau

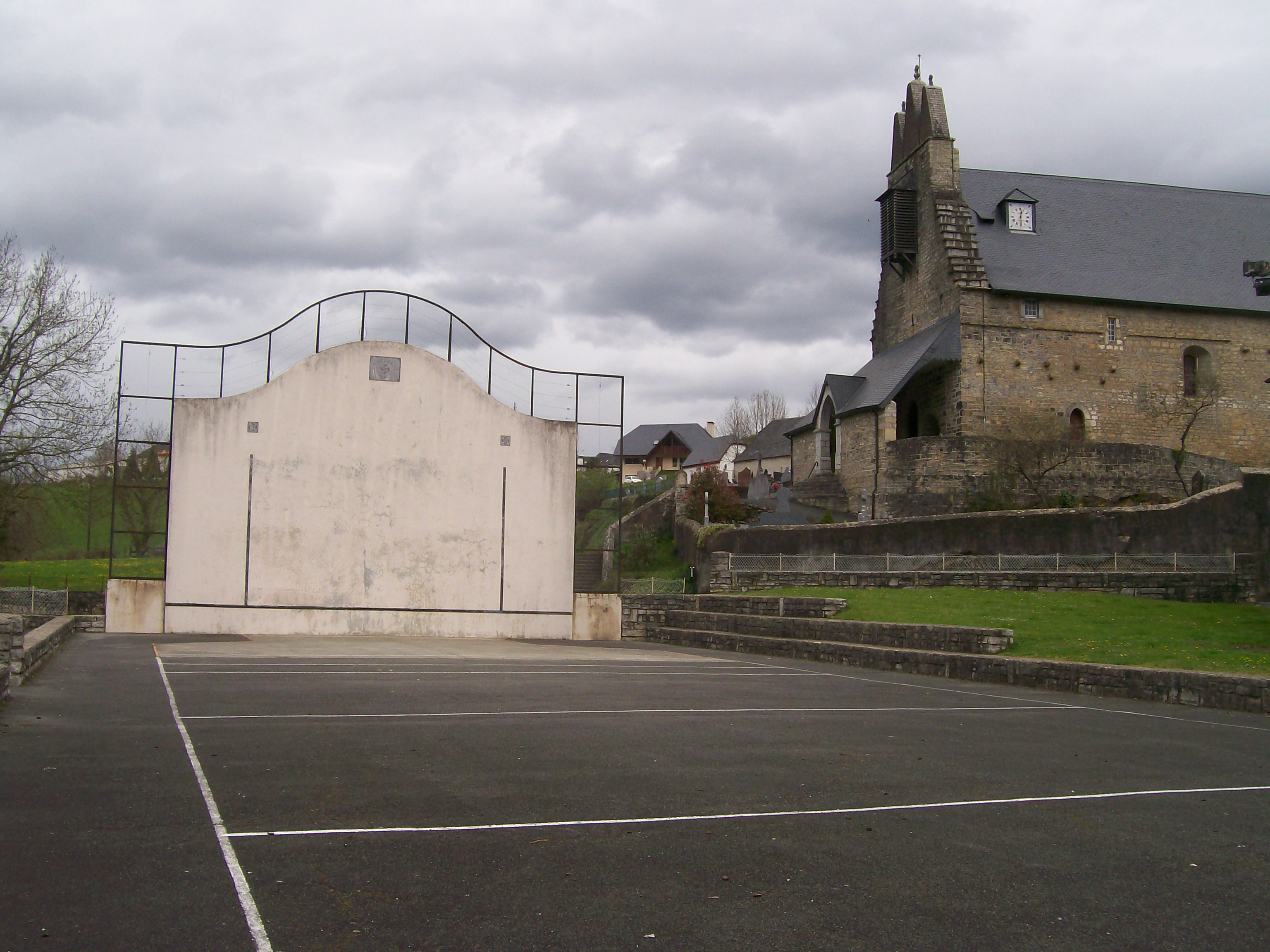
The Fronton next to the church

List of Successive Mayors

From	To	Name
1983	1989	Jean Etchebarne
1989	2008	Jean-Baptiste Queheille
2008	2020	Jean Carricaburu
2020	2026	Jean-Marie Queheille

=== Inter-communality ===
The commune is part of six inter-communal structures:

- the Communauté d'agglomération du Pays Basque;
- the sanitation association for Pays du Soule;
- the Energy association of Pyrénées-Atlantiques;
- the inter-communal association of Arbailla;
- the inter-communal association for transport from Musculdy to Ordiap;
- the inter-communal association to support Basque culture.

== Demography ==
Historical population

Year	Pop.	±% p.a.
1793	596	—
1821	700	+0.58%
1846	740	+0.22%
1872	643	−0.54%
1901	523	−0.71%
1926	502	−0.16%
1946	432	−0.75%
1962	379	−0.81%
1968	347	−1.46%

Year	Pop.	±% p.a.
1975	289	−2.58%
1982	293	+0.20%
1990	274	−0.83%
1999	254	−0.84%
2007	254	+0.00%
2012	249	−0.40%
2017	245	−0.32%
2023	230	−1.05%

Source: EHESS and INSEE

== Economy ==
Economic activity is based on agriculture (livestock and pasture). The commune is part of the Appellation d'origine contrôlée (AOC) zone of Ossau-iraty.

== Culture and Heritage ==
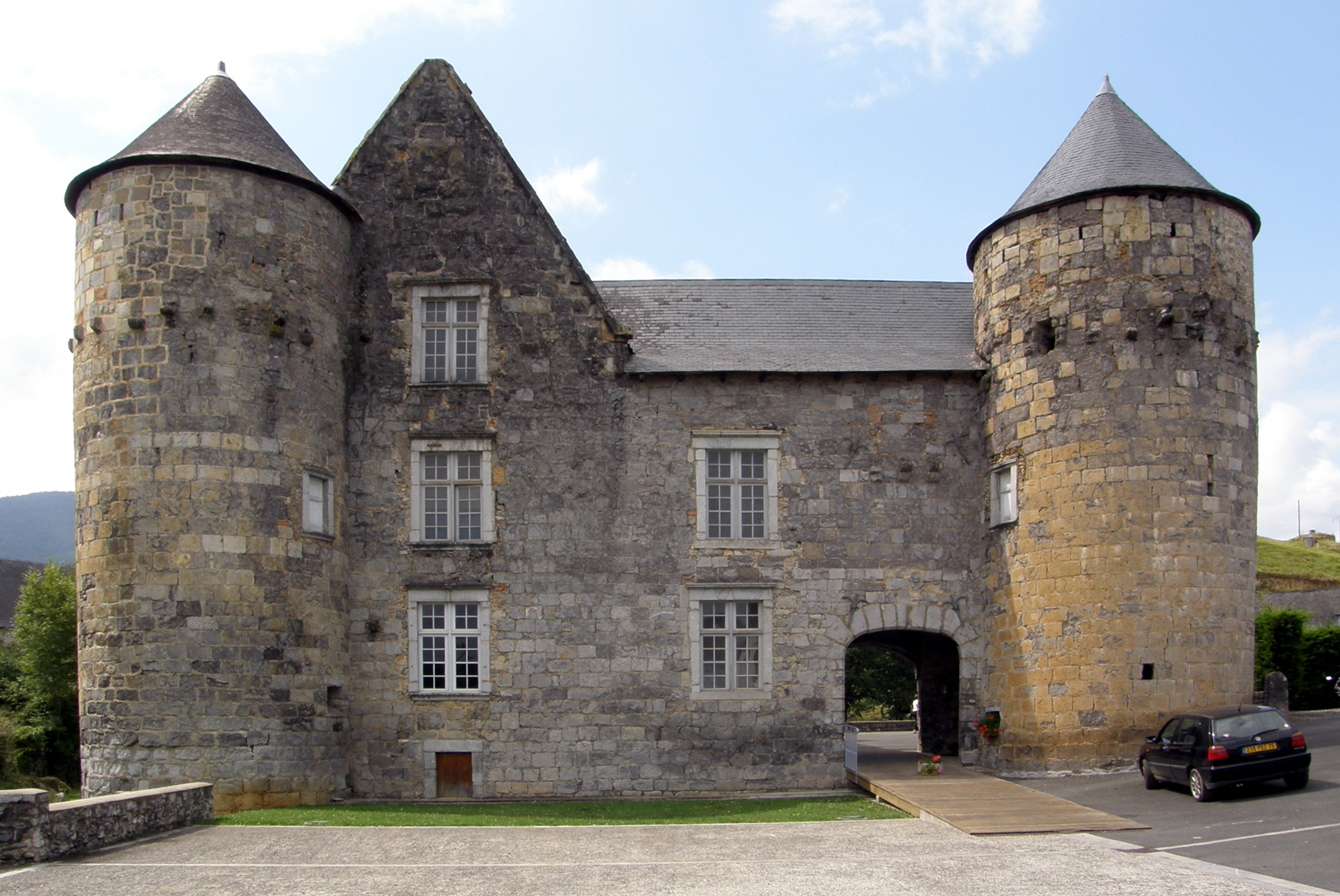
The Château of Ruthie

The village features a dynamic scene related especially to Basque culture. The inhabitants of the village performed the pastoral Ürrüti Jauregiko Peirot in 2002, a play written by the son of the village Niko Etxart, an acclaimed Basque musician.

=== Civil heritage ===
- The Chateau of Ruthie (11th century) is registered as an historical monument.
- A Gaztelu Zahar (Castellum) is at a place called gaztelu at an altitude of 582 metres.

=== Religious heritage ===
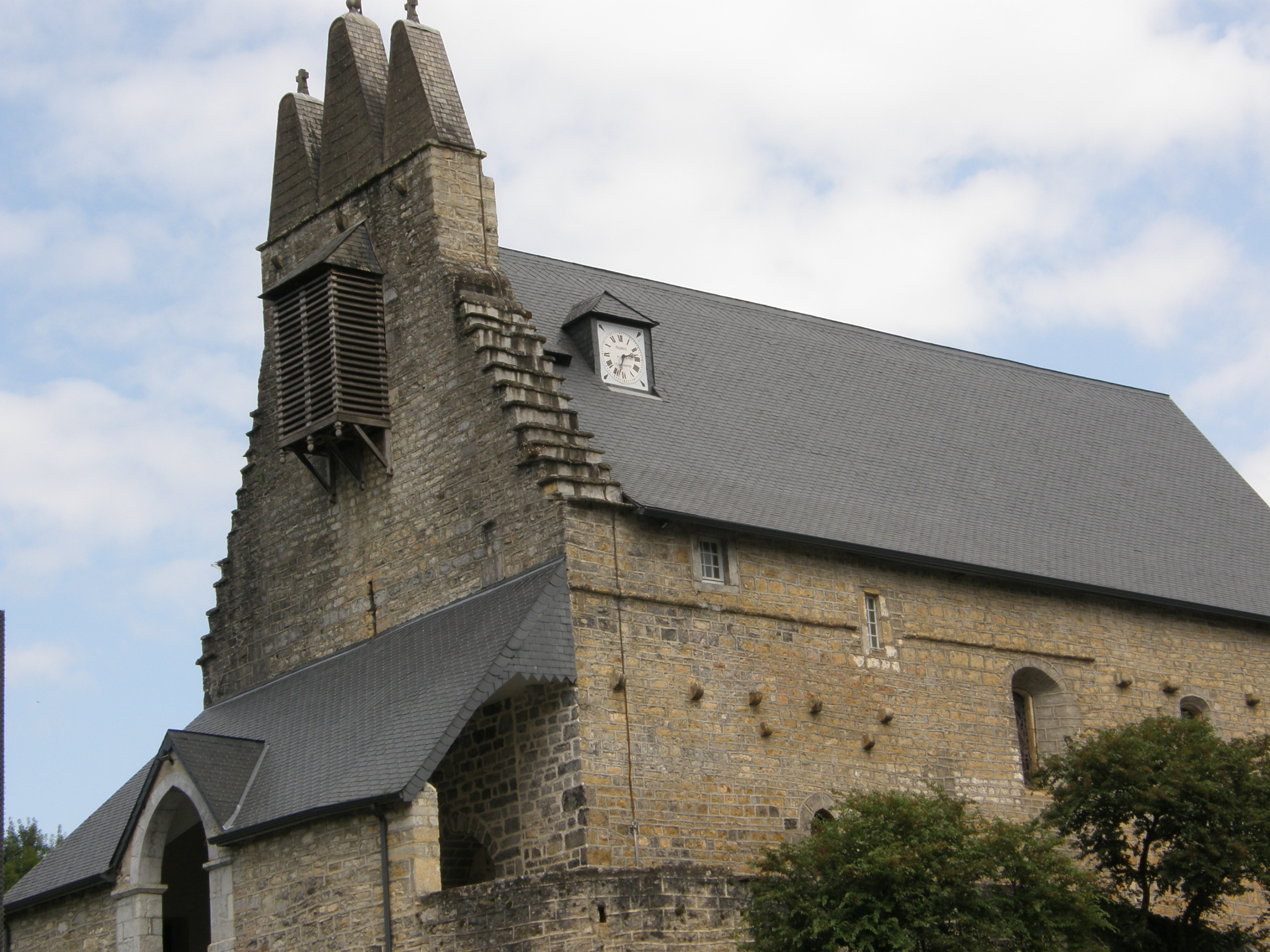
The Trinitarian steeple on the church with a horological curiosity on the roof

The town has a church with a Trinitarian steeple or a tower surmounted by three points of nearly equal height. The church contains a processional cross (17th century) which is registered as an historical object.

=== Environmental heritage ===
At the end of the 19th century, the Arbailles Forest covered parts of the communes of Aussurucq, Béhorléguy, Camou-Cihigue, Musculdy, Ordiarp, and Saint-Just-Ibarre.

A wealth of heritage in Aussurucq commune is contained in its sub-soil. Most of the territory of the commune is karstic. The environment is characterized by the presence of natural cavities in complex shapes that have not all yet been discovered or much less explored to date. Departmental cavers have undertaken the exploration, description, and publication of this heritage respecting the environment and the local population. One of the most beautiful caves in the commune is the Nébélé which has been the subject of works and regular explorations since 1972.

The peak of Ascune stands at 860 m, Echagorry is 935 m, Elsarré is 1,153 m, Sihigue is 1,193 m, and Etchecortia is 1,204 m. In the south-west of the commune, Bohorcortia is 1,214 metres high.

== Amenities ==
The town has a primary school (Garaibie).

== Notable people linked to the commune ==
- Pierre V de Charritte de Ruthie, born in Aussurucq, was chaplain to François I.
- Gilen Epherre, born at Aussurucq in 1911 and died in Bayonne in 1974, was a writer, priest, scholar and important cultural player in the post-war period

== See also ==
- Communes of the Pyrénées-Atlantiques department
