= Korrika =

Biennial Basque event

Eight facts about the Korrika. Subtitles available.

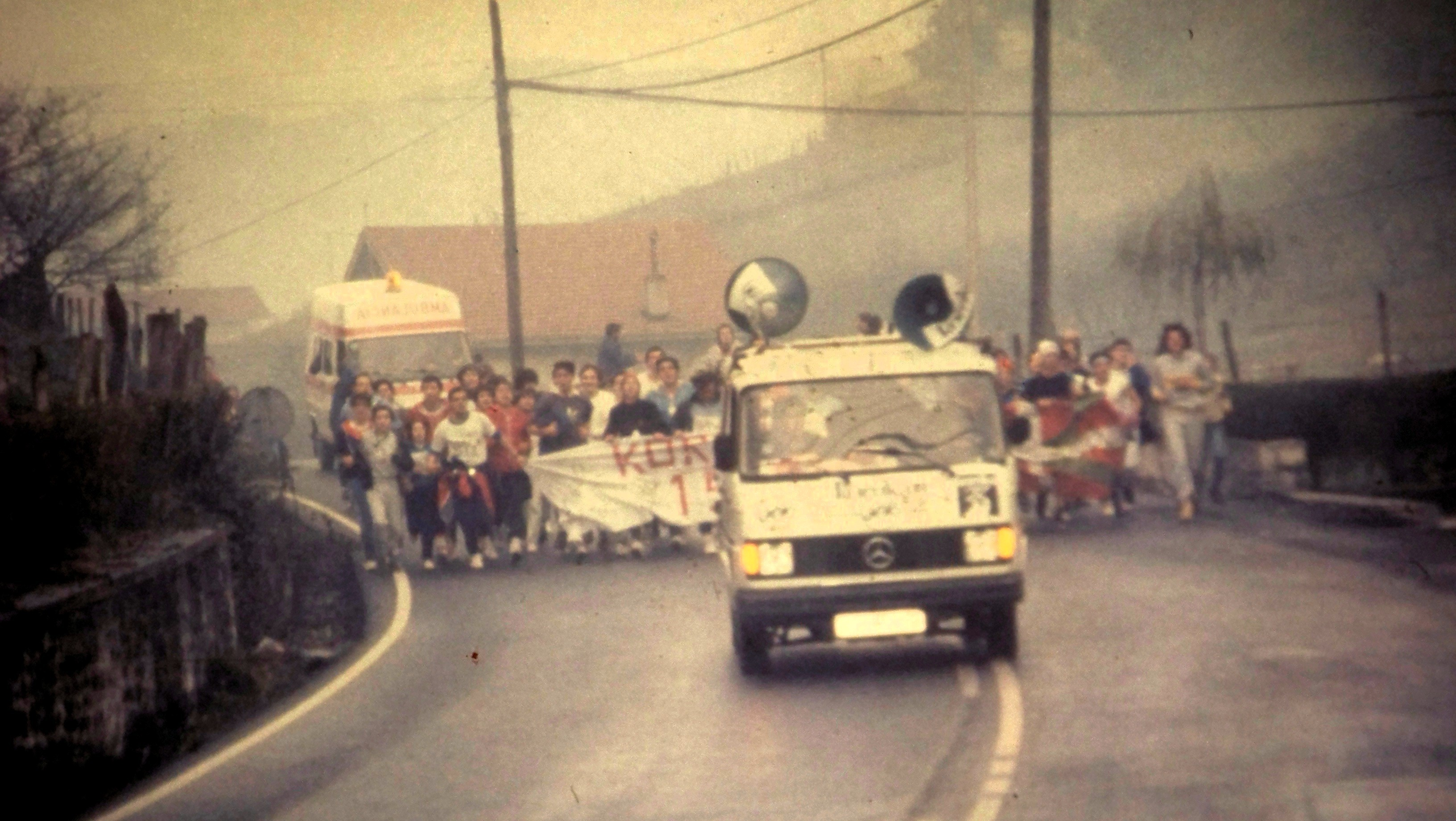
Korrika 1983. The 3th edition

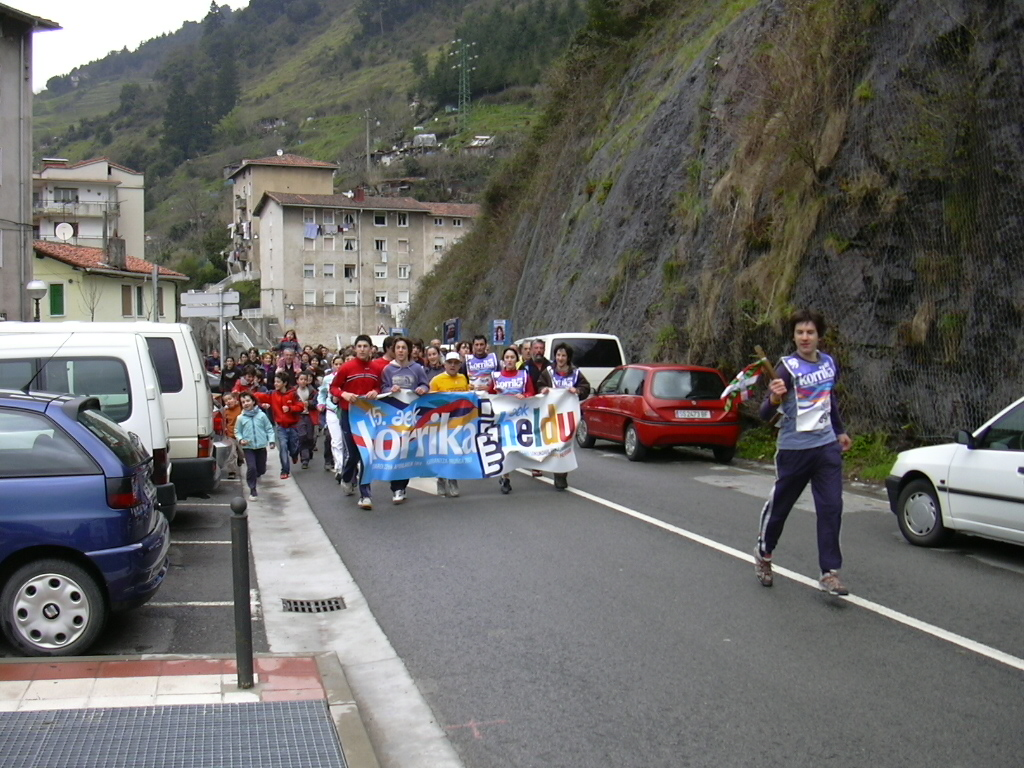
Head of the 15th Korrika running through Soraluze. 2007.

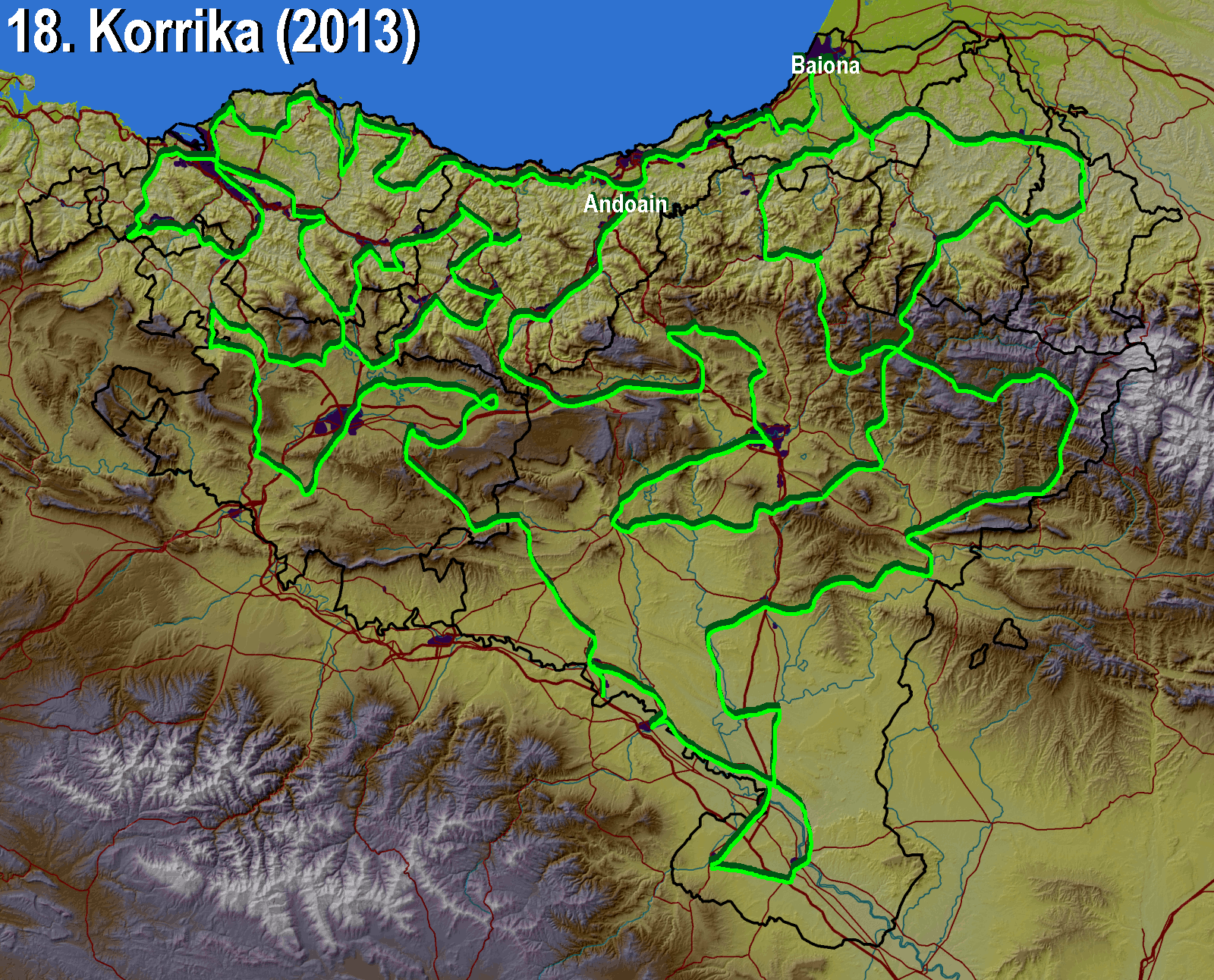
Track of the 18th edition. 2013.

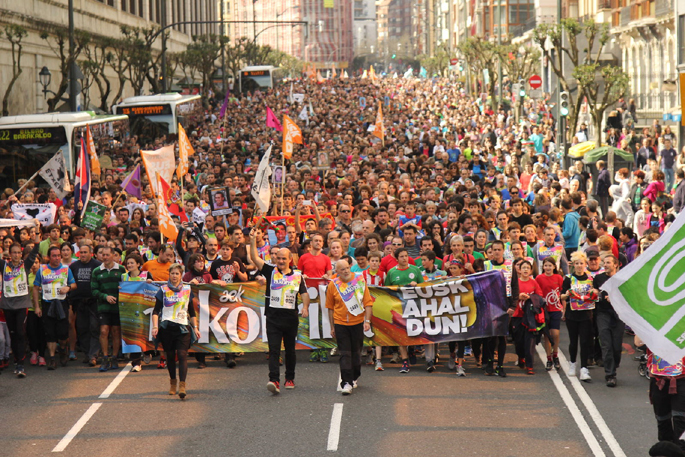
Korrika 19, finishing in Bilbao. 2015.

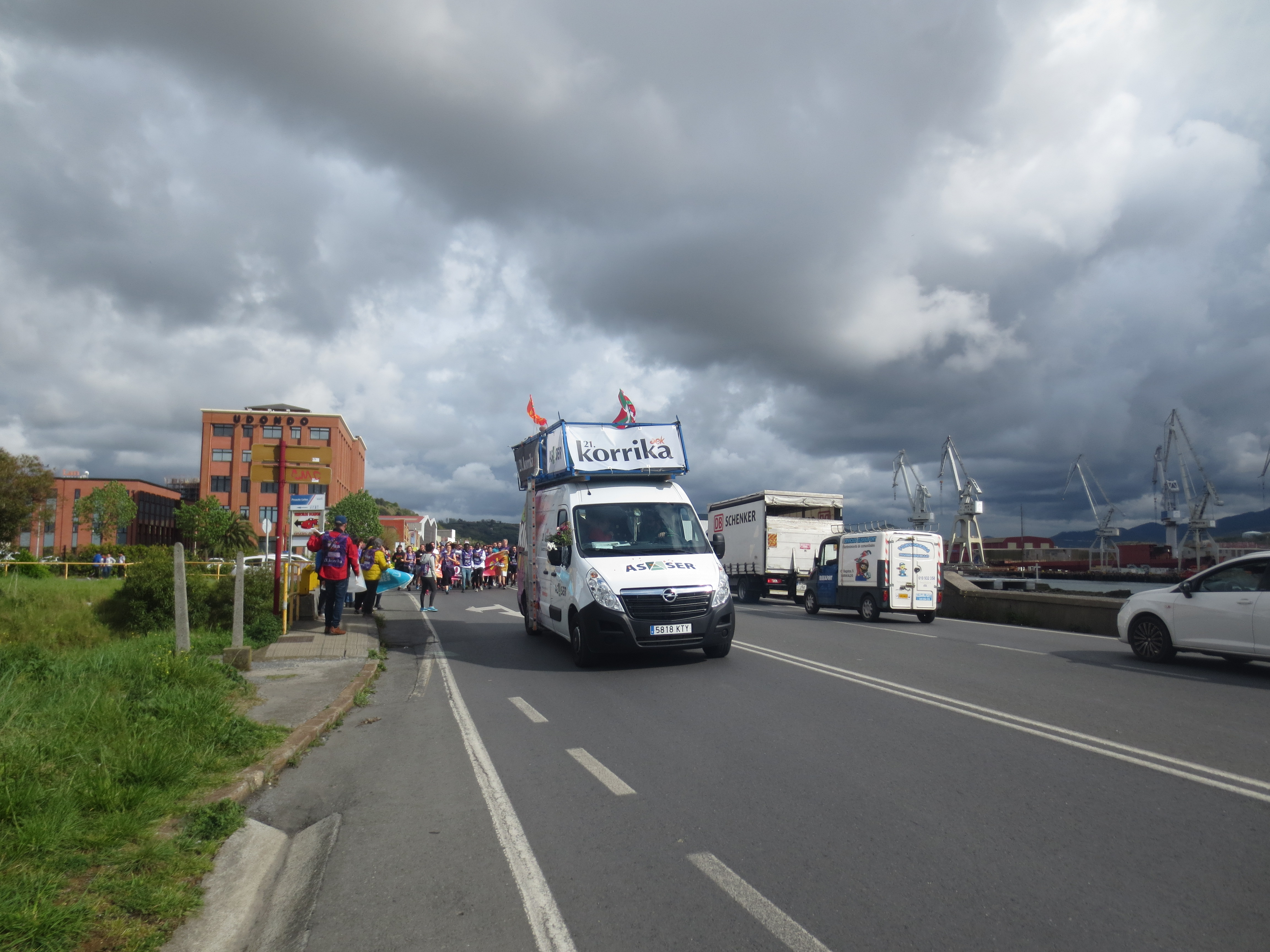
Head of the 21st Korrika in Leioa. 2019.

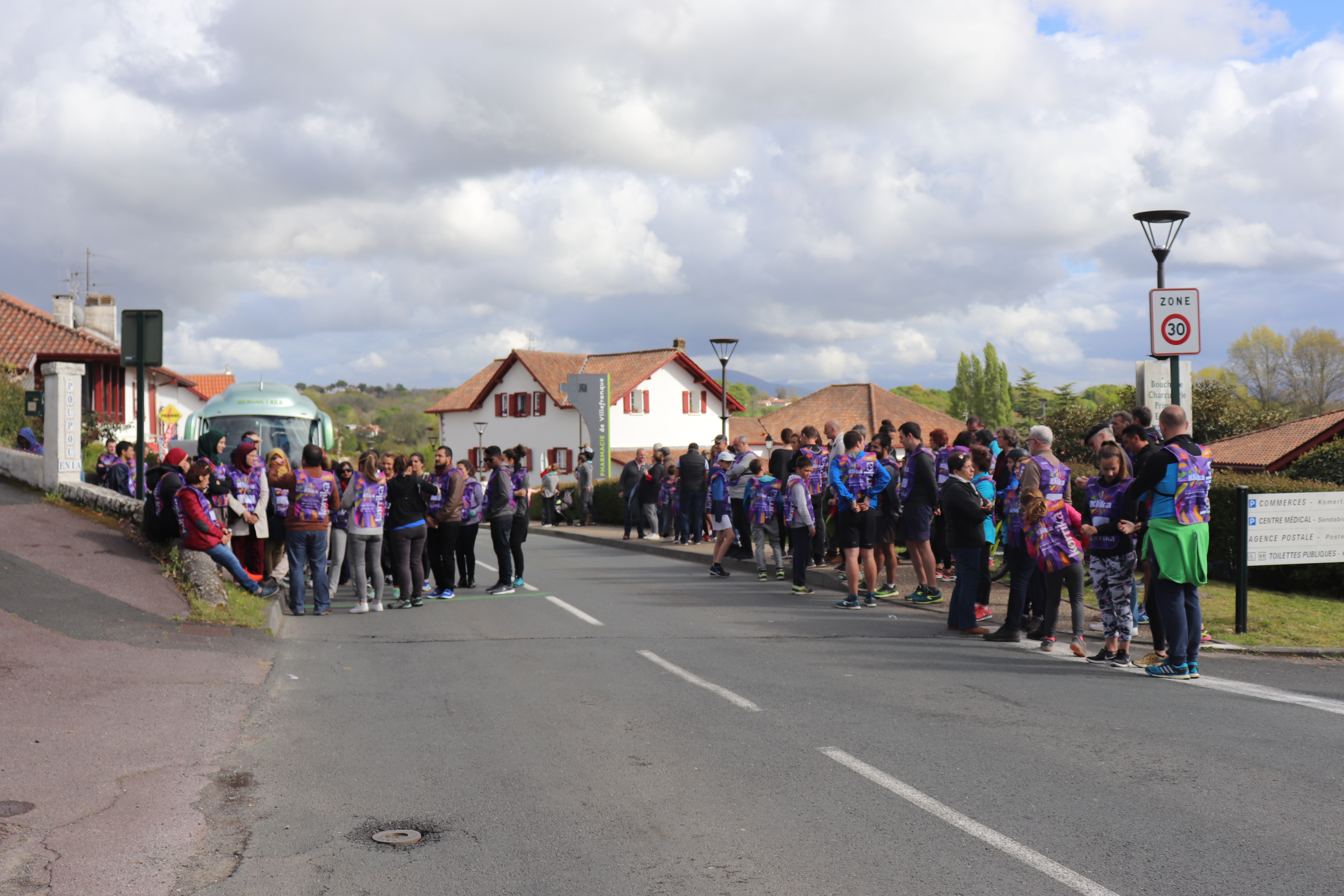
A group of Wikimedians waiting in Villefranque, Pyrénées-Atlantiques, before running in the 21st Korrika. 2019.

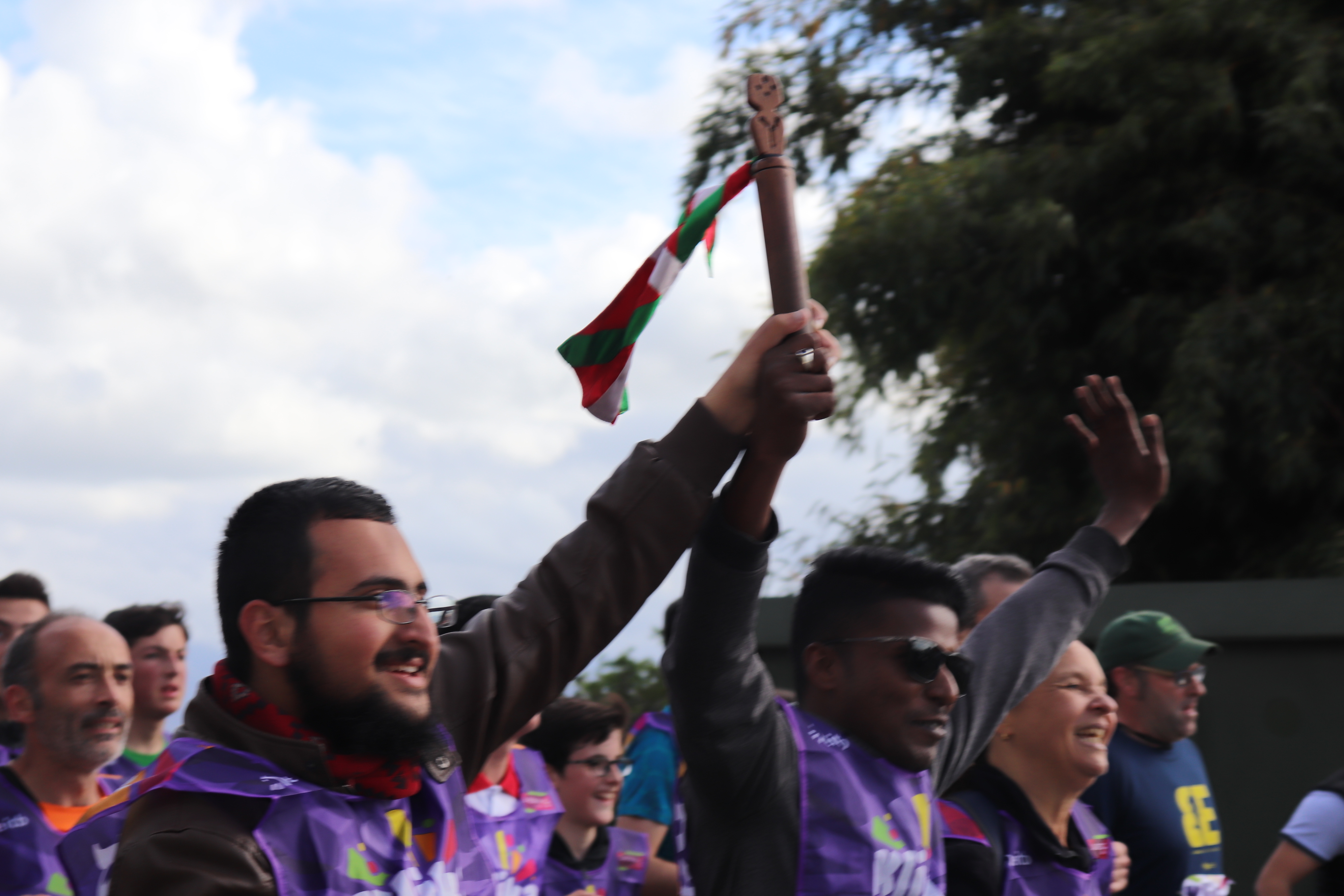
Two wikimedians carrying the Korrika baton together. 2019.

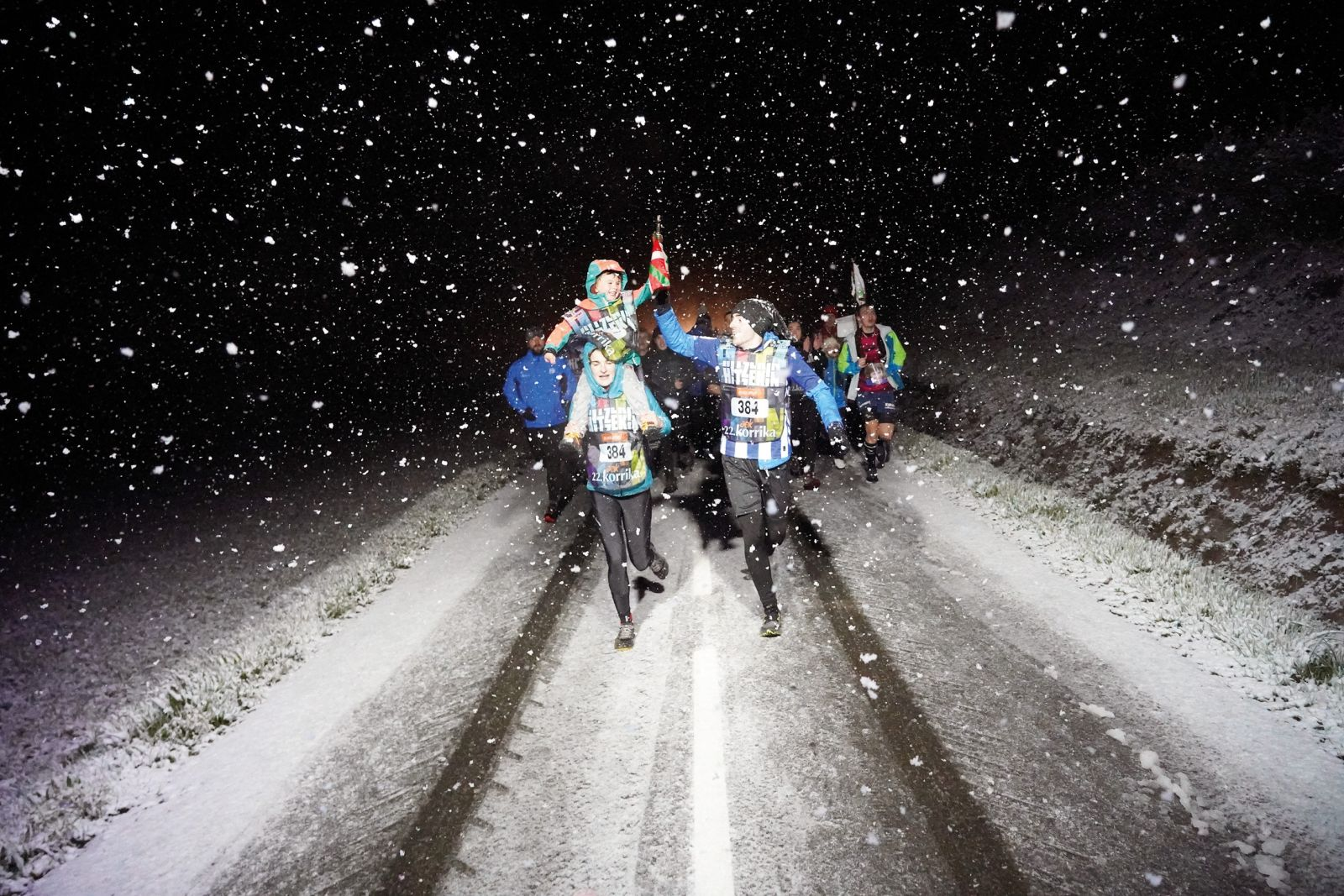
Korrika 2022. Heredia, Álava.

Korrika (Basque for running) is a biennial event in the Basque Country that creates awareness of AEK's adult Basque language curriculum and Basque language, and is also a fund raiser; AEK is an adult education organisation for the teaching of Basque language. (Note: Basque acronym for Coordinator of Literacy and Basque Promotion) It is one of the largest demonstrations gathering support for a language in the world, and the longest relay race worldwide, with 2,700 kilometres in 2024, running day and night without interruption for 11 days. The Korrika is celebrated beyond its fundraising goal, encouraging, supporting and spreading the Basque language itself.

This initiative, as well as the organisation AEK itself, was founded by people concerned with the language. It takes place in spring every second year, with the 2024 Korrika being its 23rd edition.

== Background ==
The situation of the Basque language has been described as delicate, and even unsafe, in the recent past. According to a UNESCO report, the language is in danger of extinction in several geographic areas. In fact, Basque is not considered an official language in certain areas. However, this non-competitive relay race brings the whole territory together through what can be described as "a joyful and cheery atmosphere for the two weeks in which it is held".

During Franco's dictatorship (1939–1975), the Basque language underwent a rapid decline through a long period of oppression in Spain. Basque people were even punished by the Spanish police for speaking the only language they knew in public, arguing that it was a language contrary to modernization. Moreover, speaking Basque was also prohibited in schools, where children were often punished (even physically) if caught talking Basque. A majority of linguists analyzing the situation agrees that the language policies applied by Spain and France against Basque have greatly damaged the position the language shows today.

Concerned by the weakening of the language, people started creating clandestine organisations where Basque was taught. The newly created Basque movement put together the association AEK for the teaching and alphabetization of the language. Once the dictatorship was over, a group of Basque innovators started working on the project that is nowadays one of the strongest held in the Basque territory: Korrika. Their main idea was to carry their claim across the territory, instead of concentrating all the people on the same area. The first edition set off, among criticism on the 'foolishness' of the idea, in Oñati on 29 November 1980 and concluded on 7 December in Bilbao.

== Organisation and procedure ==
Korrika is usually scheduled to last ten days. The first Korrika took place in 1980, and since, every race has followed a different route, although it always endeavours to cover a significant proportion of the historical Basque territories. The race, which proceeds continuously without even stopping during the night, has approximately a participation level of about 600,000 people.

In order to raise funds for the promotion of the Basque language, each kilometre of the race is 'sold' to a particular individual or organisation, who will be the figurehead of the race during their purchased kilometre. This race leader relays a wooden baton, preserved from the first race held, and adorned with the Basque flag or Ikurriña. The first baton was designed by Remigio Mendiburu and it can be seen in San Telmo Museum, San Sebastián. The current baton was designed by the sculptor Juan Gorriti. Every edition, the organisers of Korrika include a secret message in the baton, which is read at the end of the festival, after it has been passed hand by hand, through thousands of Basque speakers. It has always been considered an honour to carry the baton for which different organisations "buy" kilometres to support the Basque language as well as its supporter, AEK.

Behind the race leader, the immediately following participants carry a banner bearing the race slogan, that changes on every edition. The race is conducted in an extremely jovial, uncompetitive spirit, accompanied by music and general fanfare, with roads thronged with spectators. Each edition has its own song, made by different and recognized artists. During the period, a great many cultural activities are organised to promote the use of Basque, with the support of the Royal Academy of the Basque Language.

== Editions ==
Since its inception Korrika has made a different course every time, with a motto and a song.

Edition	Date	Route	Motto	Song
1	1980: 29 November – 7 December	Oñati–Bilbao	Zuk ere esan bai euskarari	Xabier Amuriza
2	1982: 22 – 30 May	Pamplona–San Sebastián	AEK, euskararen alternatiba herritarra and Korrika, herriaren erantzuna euskararen alde	Akelarre
3	1983: 3–11 December	Bayonne–Bilbao	Euskaraz eta kitto!	Egan
4	1985: 31 May – 9 June	Tardets-Sorholus–Pamplona	Herri bat, hizkuntza bat!	Lontxo Aburuza
5	1987: 3–12 April	Hendaye–Bilbao	Euskara, zeurea	Oskorri
6	1989: 14–23 April	Pamplona–San Sebastián	Euskara Korrika eta kitto and Euskal Herriak AEK	Xanti eta Maider
7	1991: 15–24 March	Vitoria-Gasteiz–Bayonne	Korrika euskara, euskaraz Euskal Herria	Irigoien Anaiak and Mikel Erramuspe
8	1993: 26 March – 4 April	Pamplona–Bilbao	Denok maite dugu gure herria euskaraz	Tapia eta Leturia
9	1995: 17–26 March	Saint-Jean-Pied-de-Port–Vitoria-Gasteiz	Jalgi hadi euskaraz	Maixa eta Ixiar, Alex Sardui, Kepa Junkera
10	1997: 14–23 March	Arantzazu–Bilbao	Euskal Herria Korrika!	Gozategi
11	1999: 19–28 March	Pamplona–San Sebastián	Zu eta ni euskaraz	Joxe Ripiau
12	2001: 29 March - 8 April	Vitoria-Gasteiz–Bayonne	Mundu bat euskarara bildu	Fermin Muguruza
13	2003: 4–13 April	Mauléon-Licharre–Pamplona	Herri bat geroa lantzen	Mikel Laboa and Ruper Ordorika
14	2005: 10–20 March	Roncesvalles–Bilbao	Euskal Herria euskalduntzen. Ni ere bai!	Afrika Bibang
15	2007: 22 March – 1 April	Karrantza–Pamplona	Heldu hitzari, lekukoari, elkarlanari, euskarari, herriari	Niko Etxart and El Drogas
16	2009: 26 March - 5 April	Tudela–Vitoria-Gasteiz	Ongi etorri euskaraz bizi nahi dugunon herrira!	Betagarri
17	2011: 7–17 April	Treviño–San Sebastián	Maitatu, ikasi, ari... Euskalakari	Gose
18	2013: 14–24 March	Andoain–Bayonne	Eman Euskara Elkarri	Esne Beltza
19	2015: 19–29 March	Urepel–Bilbao	Euskahaldun	Various artists
20	2017: 30 March – 9 April	Otxandio–Pamplona	Bat Zuk	Various artists
21	2019: 4 – 14 April	Puente la Reina–Vitoria-Gasteiz	Klika	Various artists
22	2022: 31 March – 10 April	Amurrio–San Sebastián	Hitzekin	

== Spin-offs ==
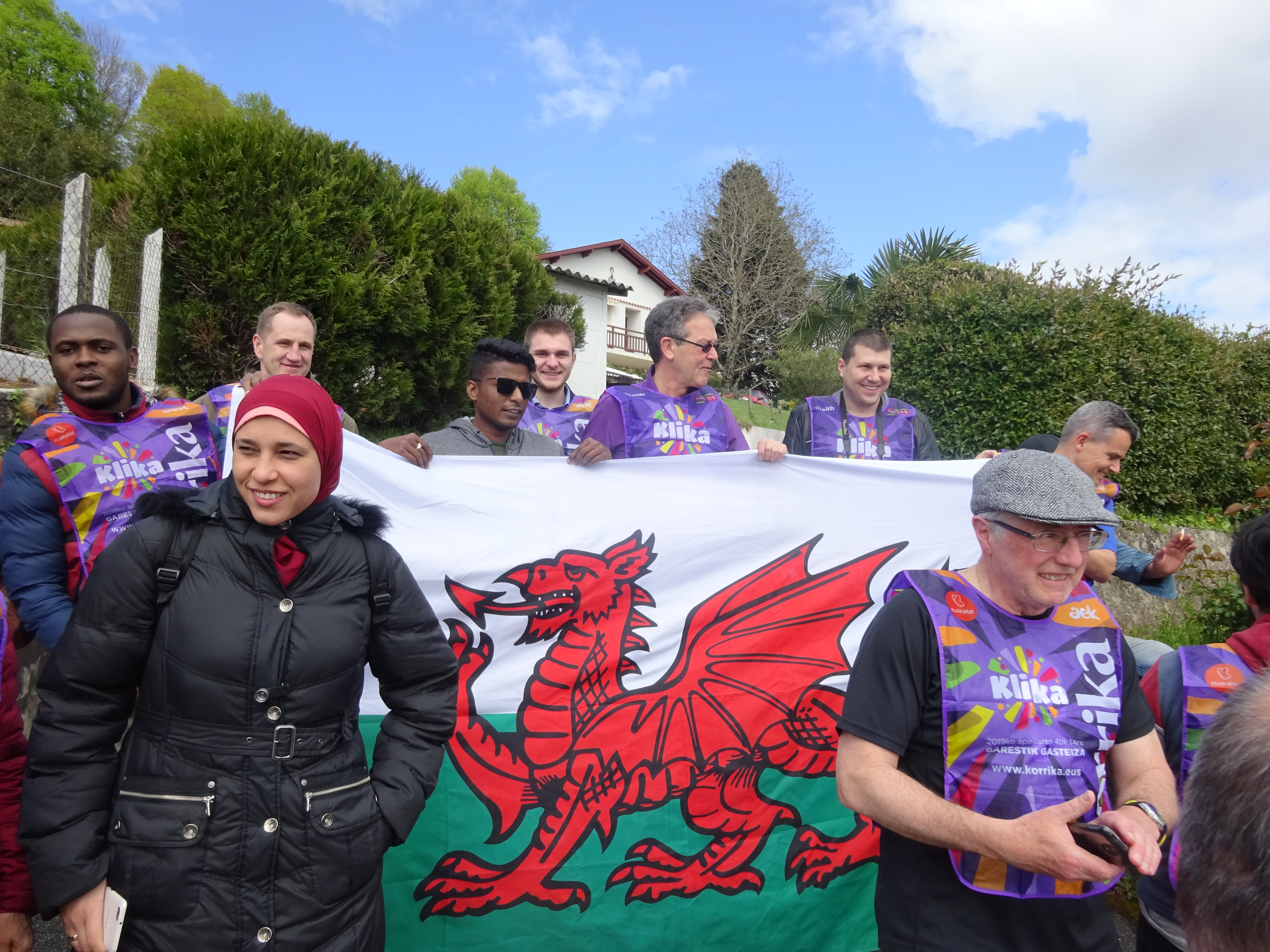
Wikimedians of Basque Country, Wales, and other countries prepare to run at Korrika 2019

The Korrika has since inspired similar events in other European countries:

- Ar Redadeg in Brittany (since 2008)
- Correllengua in Catalonia (since 1993)
- Correlingua in Galicia (since 1997)
- Corsa d'Aran in the Vall d'Aran (since 1993)
- Ras yr Iaith in Wales (starting in 2014)
- Rith in Ireland (since 2010)
