= Correllengua =

Series of celebrations promoting the use of the Catalan language

The Correllengua (Eastern Catalan: [korəˈʎeŋɡwə]) is a campaign that is held annually in the Catalan Countries. Created in 1993 by cultural Catalan association Coordinadora d'Associacions per la Llengua Catalana (CAL), it has the aim of promoting the use of Catalan language. Inspired by the Basque Korrika, the Correllengua is a series of celebrations, street dances, cultural acts and fanfare of all kinds (such as Correfoc) in order to spread the Catalan language.

== See also ==
- Korrika in the Basque Country (since 1980)
- Ar Redadeg in Brittany (since 2008)
- Rith in Ireland (starting in 2010)
