= Ar Redadeg =

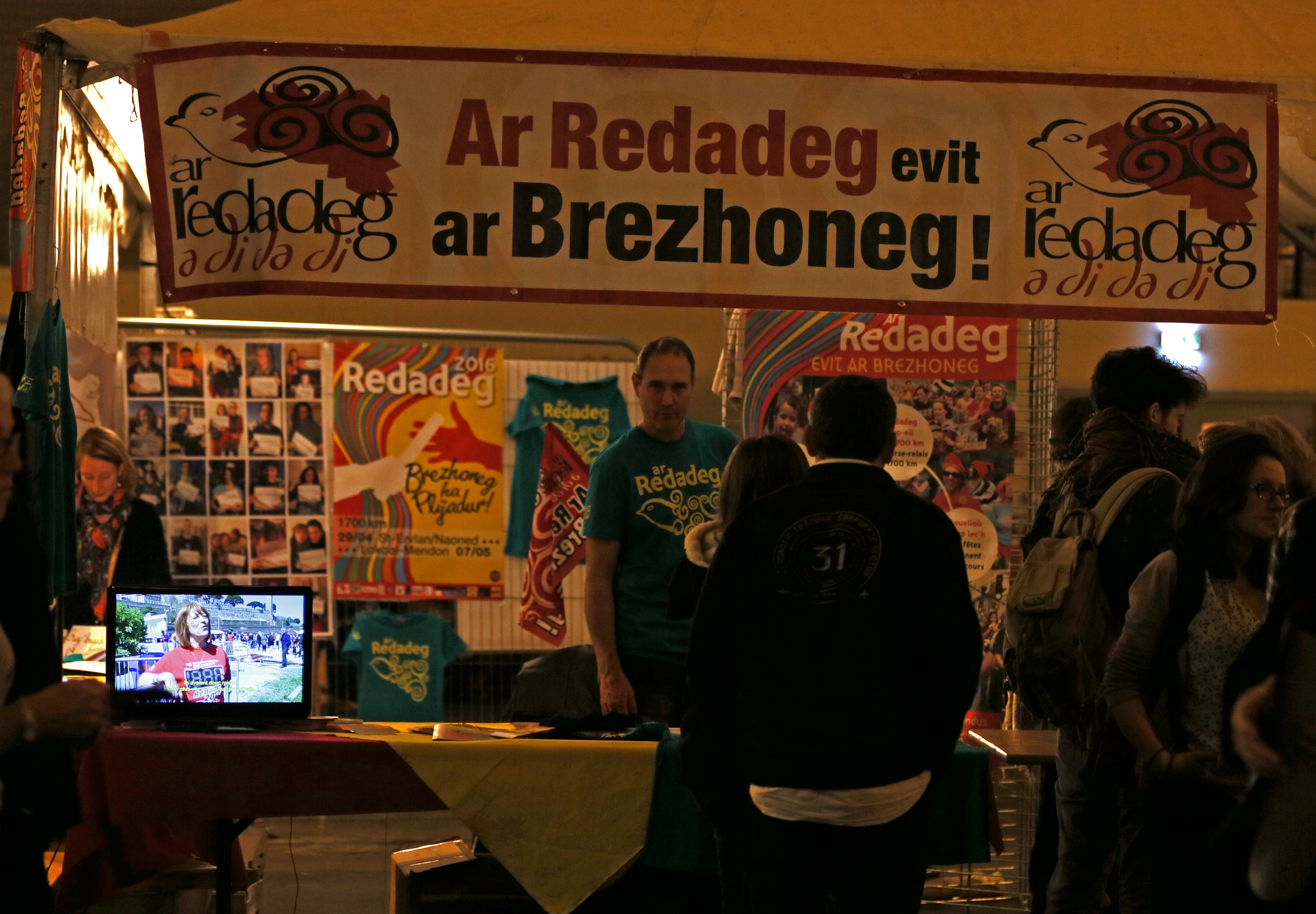

Ar Redadeg (Breton for The Race) is a relay race modelled on the Basque Korrika. It takes place around Brittany over three days and three nights from Naoned (Nantes) to Karaez (Carhaix). Its aim is to raise funds each year to finance a project promoting the Breton language.

While the Korrika has taken place every two years since 1980, this is the first Redadeg to be organised started on April 30, 2008. The runners covered some 600 km (370 mi) at an average speed of 9 km (5.6 mi) per hour.

The route for Ar Redadeg was planned so it would go through the five Breton départements: Penn-ar-Bed (Finistère), Aodoù-an-Arvor (Côtes-d'Armor), Mor-Bihan (Morbihan, the only one to have been given a Breton name in French), Il-ha-Gwilen (Ille-et-Vilaine) and Liger-Atlantel (Loire-Atlantique). Note that the latter is not included in the region of Brittany, as defined by the French authorities, even though it is historically a part of Brittany. Starting the race in Naoned (Nantes), the préfecture of Liger-Atlantel is therefore highly significant.

At the end of every kilometre, runners would pass each other a baton containing a message to be read in Karaez at the end of the race. One fund-raising method in this event is payment by each runner of 100 euros for the privilege of bearing the baton over a kilometre.

The funds raised in the 2008 edition of the race will benefit the Diwan Schools, through which the French Ministry of Education curriculum is taught using the Breton language. The itinerary went through as many towns and cities as possible where Diwan schools are operating.

French governments have traditionally refused to give official status to any of the many languages spoken in France such as Alsatian, Basque, Breton, Catalan, Corsican, Dutch (West Flemish) and Occitan, to mention only the better known continental ones. Instead, some acknowledgement was given to some of these languages (such as Breton) under the form of bilingual road signs and some teaching of regional languages on a voluntary basis. In spite of its linguistic and cultural diversity, and appeals made by linguistic minorities for granting of official status for their languages, France only lists French as its official language, while United Kingdom, for example, has granted official status to French (as an official language of Jersey) and Welsh (in Wales), along with Scottish Gaelic (in Scotland).

The existence of schools such as Diwan plays an essential role in the efforts made to pass the Breton language on to new generations, but the lack of an official status for the language they promote weakens their position.

== In other countries ==
- the Korrika in the Basque Country
- the Correllengua in Catalonia
- Rith in Ireland
