= Rith =

Irish annual relay race

- Location: Ireland
- Event type: Relay race
- Primary sponsor: Foras na Gaeilge (partly)
- Established: 2010
- Website: Archived 2013-02-25 at the Wayback Machine

Rith (Irish pronunciation: [ɾˠɪh]) is a relay race organised in support of the Irish language. It was held for the first time in 2010 and coincided with Seachtain na Gaeilge, the Week of the Irish Language. The original race started in Belfast and finished in Galway. Each race traverses both the Republic of Ireland and Northern Ireland. Foras na Gaeilge partly funds the race.

Rith is a spin-off from the Korrika, a relay race organised in the Basque in support of the Basque language since 1980. It has since spun off the Correllengua in Catalonia; Corsa d'Aran in Val d'Aran (also Catalonia); Correlingua in Corsica; 'La Passem' in Gascony; and Ar Redadeg in Brittany.
