= Niko Etxart =

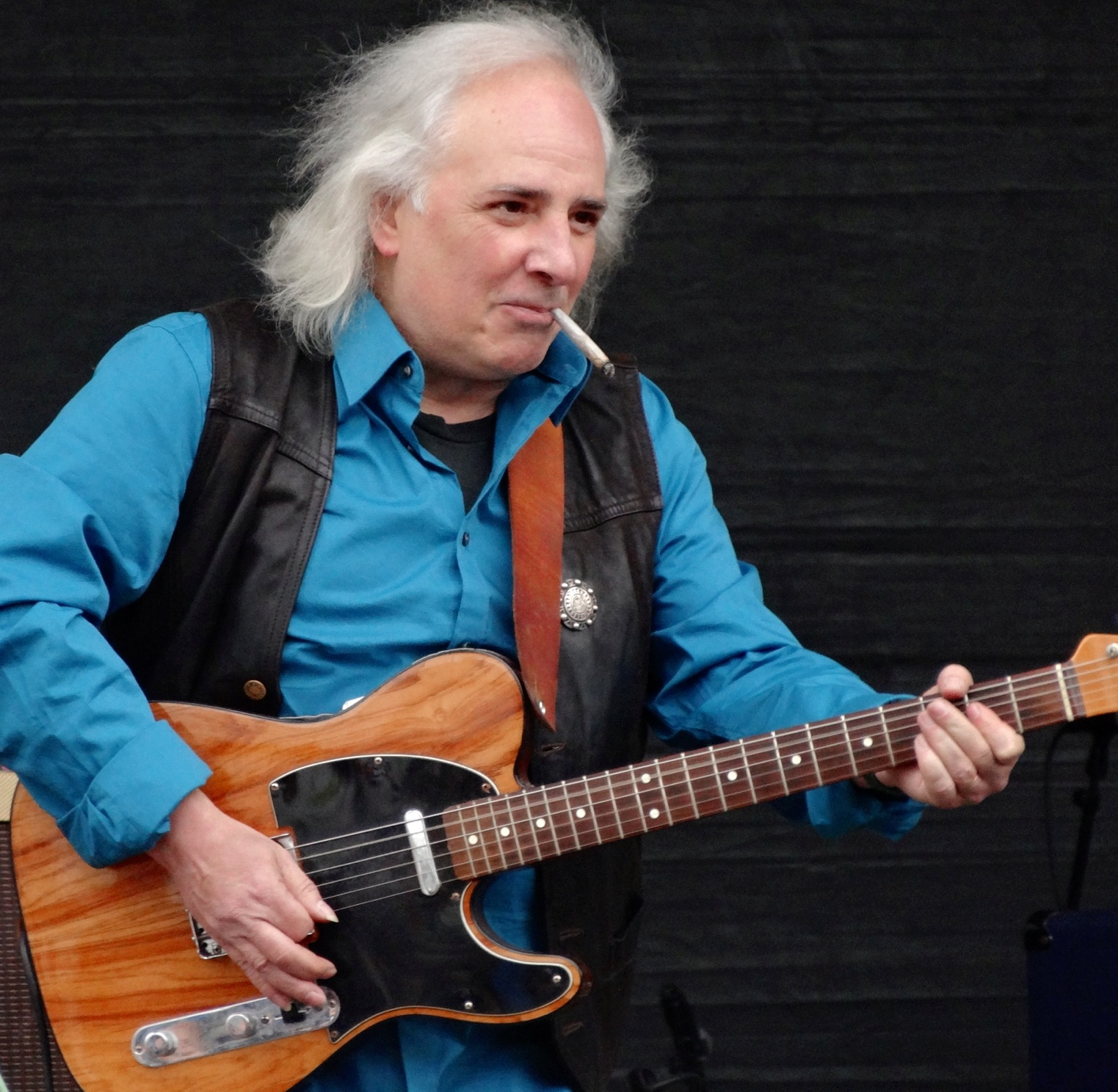

Background information
- Origin: Altzürüku, Basque Country,
- Genres: pop-rock, traditional folk music
- Years active: 1974 –

Niko Etxart is a Basque singer-songwriter and musician born in 1953 in Altzürükü, Soule, Basque Country. He's widely reputed in the Basque area for being a forerunner of Basque rock and bridging the gap between Basque old tradition and modern music trends.

== Early life ==
Niko Etxart was born in Altzürükü. When he was two years old, his parents moved to Paris. However, unlike many others, he received the Basque language and culture as a child, in particular through the Basque centre in Paris. When he left school in 1972, his only wish was to be a singer. By this year he founded a group named Tinka with two other friends.

== Music ==
After living in Paris since his early childhood, moved out in 1974 to the rural land of his parents in Soule with brand new ideas about music, taking up rock and roll and singing in Basque. He put together the band Minxoriak in 1976 without giving up his solo career as a musician, so besides working with the band till the mid-80s, Etxart staged performances on his own as well as releasing various albums. Some of his songs have attained considerable popularity both in the Southern and Northern Basque Country.

In the late 1990s and the 2000s, he has taken up composing traditional pastorals, as well as staging traditional vocal songs along with his father Dominika and Robert Larrandaburu. When performing with instrumental background, he's supported by the band Hapa-Hapa (Zuberoan Basque for 'panting'). Among his most abiding hits Euskal Rock'n Roll, Baga biga klik, Tumatxa, Eperra (traditional) can be counted, to mention but a few.

== Significance ==
In a time when the Southern Basque Country still remained under the yoke of Franco's dictatorship, with Basque language and culture quickly losing ground to French, and Basque society struggling between modernity and loyalty to conservative old traditions, not only did Etxart switch to new contents but more controversially he brought along new forms: electric guitar, jeans, long hair, secularity, etc., which didn't go down well with Basque conservative circles and political and cultural activists.

The musician showed a rocker outlook, even releasing a hit, "Euskal Rock'n Roll", that made it to the 17th position in the Spanish charts (Los 40 Principales). However, thereafter he has evolved into gentler tunes, while sticking to rocky manners and look.

== Audio sample ==
Heldu Korrikari
An excerpt from Heldu Korrikari

== Discography ==
Albums

- Nahasteka (1979)
- Has' dantzan (1980)
- Min Xoriak eta Niko Etxart (1980)
- Tumatxa (1983)
- Baikor (1990)
- Gili-gilikatzen haüt (1996)
- Ürrüti Jauregiko Peirot (2002)
- Eperra (2003)
- Minuette (2005)

Single

- Euskal rock n' roll (1979)
