= Fermin Muguruza =

Basque rock musician

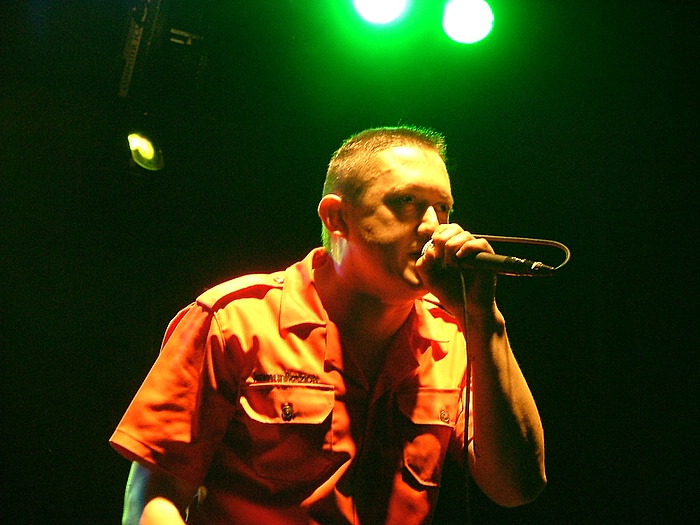

Background information
- Born: 20 April 1963 (age 63); Irun, Spain
- Genres: Punk rock; ska; rock
- Occupations: Musician; songwriter; producer
- Instrument: Vocals
- Years active: 1983–present
- Website: Official website

Fermin Muguruza (born 20 April 1963) is a Basque Spanish rock musician, singer, songwriter, producer, record label manager, and co-founder of the ska punk band Kortatu, active from 1983 to 1988, and of the crossover group Negu Gorriak, active from 1990 to 1996.

Born in Irun, Gipuzkoa, Basque Country, he is the brother of musicians Íñigo Muguruza and Jabier Muguruza and is one of the personalities interviewed for the documentary film The Basque Ball, released in 2003.

== Musical career ==
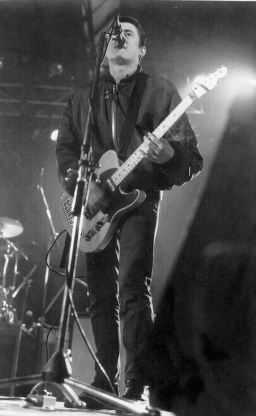
Fermin Muguruza onstage with Kortatu

Muguruza has taken part in more than twenty albums, and is one of the most important artists from the Basque Country.

In 1983 he founded a fusion ska punk band called Kortatu with his brother Iñigo and drummer Treku Armendariz, among the first to popularise ska in Spain. They were influenced by the Clash, in fact, Muguruza decided to create the band after seeing Strummer's band in a gig in San Sebastián on May 2, 1981. His song "Sarri, Sarri", a Basque cover of Toots & the Maytals' "Chatty Chatty", grew into a highly popular song during the 80s, where he makes an explicit reference to Joseba Sarrionaindia's artful escape from prison in 1985.

In 1988 the group disbanded, but Fermin and Iñigo would come together again in 1990 to create the crossover group Negu Gorriak, along with Kaki Arkarazo, who had produced Kortatu's last records. In 1997 he collaborated with Dut. More recently he has developed a solo career, always defending the use of the Basque language and the need for social justice.

== Views on society and politics ==
Fermin Muguruza is a staunch left-wing Basque nationalist and internationalist. He consistently champions self-determination, anti-imperialism, and cultural survival, viewing the Basque struggle as one of many interconnected, worldwide liberation movements against oppression and neoliberal globalization.

In interviews he has persistently denounced the policies of the Basque, Spanish and French governments and police bodies, as well as those of Spanish nationalist groups. At an international level, Fermin Muguruza holds left-wing views that lead him to criticize the U.S. government, corporations and the globalization process, all of which he denounces as imperialistic and homogenizing.

In an interview with Freemuse, Muguruza speaks about his experience as a musician under the democracy of today. He has performed in concerts where fascists would come to his concerts with bombs, threatening him and his Basque hip-hop music. However, he experiences censorship within Spain for his political and social messages, but still performs and makes music, saying "authorities are afraid of my music because it is a tool against ignorance. And these authorities want the ignorance so that they can do what they want".

Musically, he has been inspired by what he regards as the oppression of Spain over Basque Country. And although most of his lyrics are in Basque, his compositions are a melting pot of different cultures, with a big influence of Jamaican and electronic music (especially drum and bass), which he commonly mixes over Basque instruments. In his track "Euskal Herria Jamaika Clash!, Fermin Muguruza mixes Jamaican rhythms with sounds from Basque traditional musical instruments to produce unique musical hybrids that feature Basque heritage and culture.

== Discography ==
=== Kortatu ===
- Kortatu/Cicatriz/Jotakie/Kontuz Hi! (1985)
- Kortatu (1985)
- El estado de las cosas (1986)
- Kolpez kolpe (1988)
- Azken guda dantza (1988)

=== Negu Gorriak ===
- Negu Gorriak (1990)
- Gure Jarrera (1991)
- Gora Herria (1991)
- Borreroak Baditu Milaka Aurpegi (1993)
- Hipokrisiari Stop! Bilbo 93-X-30 (1994)
- Ideia Zabaldu (1995)
- Ustelkeria (1996)
- Salam, agur (1996)
- 1990-2001 (DVD + Live CD) (2005)

=== Fermin Muguruza eta Dut ===
- Ireki ateak (1997)

=== Fermin Muguruza ===
- Amodio eta gorrotozko kantak (1984-1998) (1998)
- Brigadistak Sound System (1999)
- erREMIXak (1999)
- FM 99.00 Dub Manifest (2000)
- Korrika. mundu bat euskarara bildu (2001)
- In-komunikazioa (2002)
- Irun Meets Bristol. Komunikazioa (2003)
- Sala Apolo, Barcelona 21/01/04 (2004)
- 99-04 DVD + CD (2005)
- Xomorroak (Bizitza lorontzian) (2005)
- Euskal Herria Jamaika Clash (2006)
- BASS-que Culture DVD + Remix CD (2006)
- Asthmatic Lion Sound Systema (2008)
- Asthmatic Lion REMIX + beste harribitxi batzuk (2009)
