= Béhorléguy =

Béhorléguy Behorlegi
- Commune
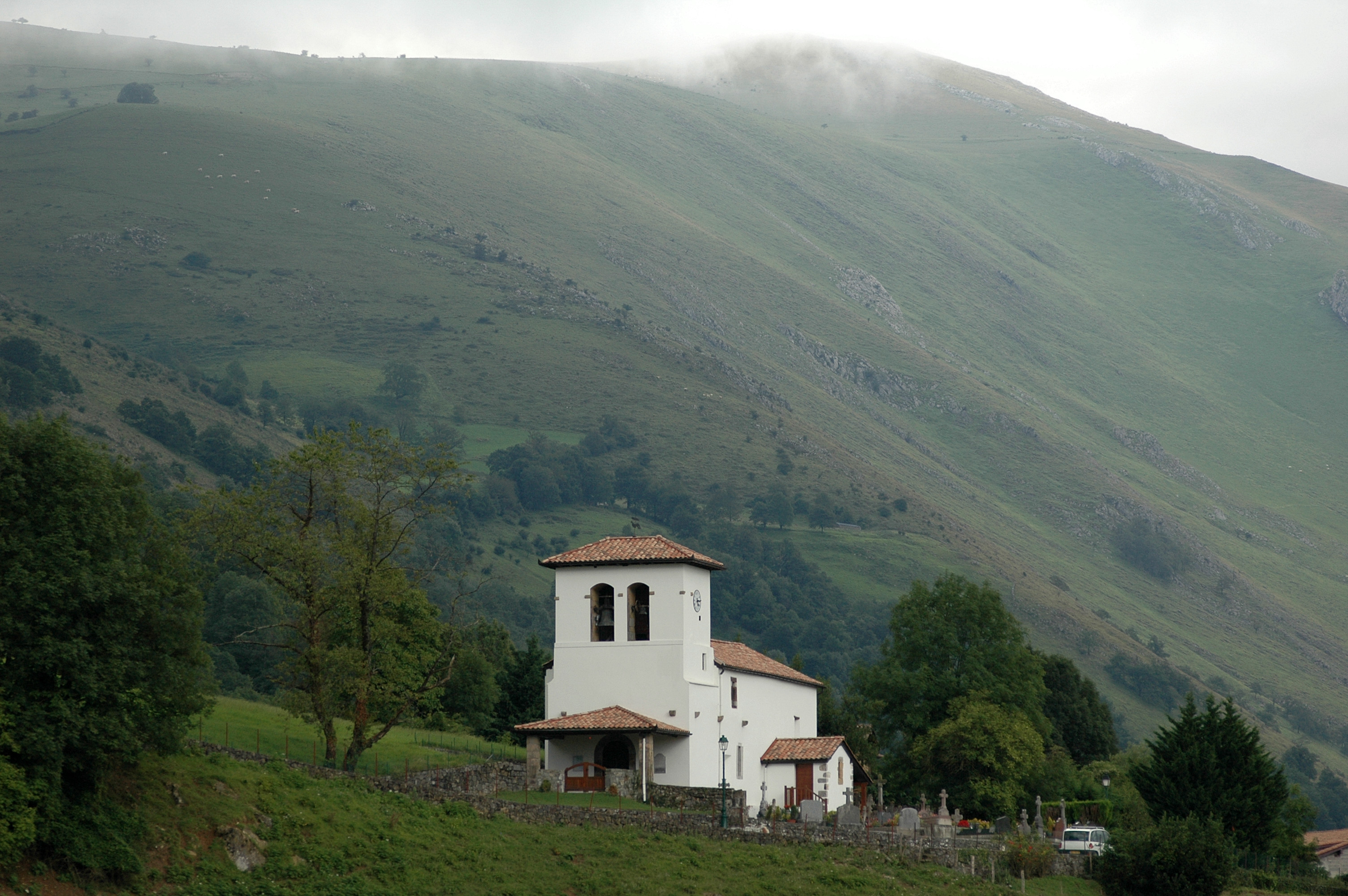
- The church of the Assumption, in Béhorléguy

- Coat of arms
- Location of Béhorléguy
- Location within France Location within Nouvelle-Aquitaine
- Coordinates: 43°07′45″N 1°07′03″W
- Country: France
- Region: Nouvelle-Aquitaine
- Department: Pyrénées-Atlantiques
- Arrondissement: Bayonne
- Canton: Montagne Basque
- Intercommunality: CA Pays Basque

Government
  - Mayor (2020–2026): Pascal Néguelouart
- Area^{1}: 20.58 km^{2} (7.95 sq mi)
- Elevation: 694 m (2,277 ft)
- Highest elevation: 1,267 m (4,157 ft)
- Lowest elevation: 299 m (981 ft)
- Population (2023): 66
  - Density: 3.2/km^{2} (8.3/sq mi)
- Time zone: UTC+01:00 (CET)
  - Summer (DST): UTC+02:00 (CEST)
- INSEE/Postal code: 64107 /64220
- ^{1} French Land Register data, which excludes lakes, ponds, glaciers > 1 km^{2} (0.386 sq mi or 247 acres) and river estuaries.

Béhorléguy (French pronunciation: [beɔʁleɡi]; Occitan: Behorlegui; Basque: Behorlegi) is a commune of the Pyrénées-Atlantiques department in southwestern France.

It is located in the former province of Lower Navarre.

== See also ==
- Communes of the Pyrénées-Atlantiques department
