= Brigadistak Sound System =

Studio album by Fermin Muguruza
- Released: 1999
- Recorded: 1999
- Genre: Alternative rock, punk rock, dub, rap, reggae
- Length: 61:30
- Label: Esan Ozenki
- Producer: Unknown

Fermin Muguruza chronology
| Amodio eta gorrotzko kantak (1998) | Brigadistak Sound System (1999) | erREMIXak (1999) |

Brigadistak Sound System is a studio album from Basque artist Fermin Muguruza. It was released in 1999 and produced by Esan Ozenki Records.

The title track refers to the International Brigades. Some themes featured in the other songs include globalisation, American imperialism and Basque nationalism. Most of the lyrics are sung in euskera. Almost every track is a collaboration with another artist or band. Tracks 3, 5 and 13 were recorded in Los Angeles (Cherokee Studios), tracks 6 and 12 in Azkarate, track 1 in Rome, track 2 in Caracas, track 4 in Biarritz, track 7 in Paris, track 8 in Barcelona, track 9 in Montreuil, track 10 in Havana, track 11 in Buenos Aires and track 14 in London.

== Track listing ==
1. Urrun - with Radici nel Cemento
2. Hitza Har Dezagun - with Desorden Público
3. Newroz
4. Puzka
5. Harria - with Tijuana No
6. Lagun Nazakezu - with Hechos Contra el Decoro
7. Eguraldi Lainotsua Hiriburuan - with International Spartak
8. Maputxe - with Manu Chao
9. Brigadistak - with Alex from Inadaptats, Fernando from El Corazón del Sapo
10. Oasiko Erregina - with Amparanoia and Los Van Van
11. 54-46 (Toots & the Maytals cover) - with Todos Tus Muertos
12. Ari Du Hotza
13. Nazio Ibiltaria Naiz - with Aztlan Underground and Rodleen Getsic
14. Urrun Dub dubbed by Mad Professor
