= Languages of the Iberian Peninsula =

There have been many languages spoken in the Iberian Peninsula.

== Historic languages ==
=== Pre-Roman languages ===
Pre-Roman languages of Iberia circa 300 BC

The following languages were spoken in the Iberian Peninsula before the Roman occupation and the spread of the Latin language.

- Aquitanian (probably closely related to or the same as Proto-Basque)
- Proto-Basque
- Iberian
- Tartessian
- Indo-European languages
  - Celtic languages
    - Celtiberian
    - Gallaecian
  - Lusitanian (disputed: either Italic, Celtic, Para-Celtic or other Indo-European)
  - Sorothaptic
  - Hellenic
    - Ancient Greek
- Afro-Asiatic languages
  - Semitic languages
    - Phoenician
      - Punic

=== Medieval languages ===
The following languages were spoken in the Iberian Peninsula in medieval times, following the fall of the Western Roman Empire.

- Medieval Basque
- Indo-European languages
  - Germanic languages
    - Buri
    - Gothic
    - Suebian
    - Vandalic
  - Italic languages
    - Latin
      - Astur-Leonese
      - Galician-Portuguese (Old Galician)
      - Old Catalan
      - Old Provençal (Old Occitan)
      - Old Castilian (Old Spanish)
      - Mozarabic
      - Navarro-Aragonese
      - Judaeo-Romance languages
        - Judaeo-Aragonese
        - Judaeo-Catalan
        - Judaeo-Portuguese
        - Judaeo-Spanish
  - Celtic languages
    - Brittonic
  - Indo-Iranian languages
    - Scythian
      - Alanic
    - Romani
- Afro-Asiatic languages
  - Berber languages
  - Semitic languages
    - Arabic languages
      - Classical Arabic
        - Andalusian Arabic
    - Medieval Hebrew (a written language based on Biblical Hebrew)
      - Sephardi Hebrew

== Modern languages ==
The following indigenous languages are currently spoken in the Iberian Peninsula.

=== By linguistic group ===
Languages of the Iberian Peninsula (simplified).

- Basque (isolate)
  - Batua
  - Biscayan
  - Gipuzkoan
  - Upper Navarrese
  - Lower Navarrese
  - Lapurdian
  - Souletin
- Indo-European languages
  - Italic languages
    - Romance languages
      - Aragonese
      - Astur-Leonese
        - Asturian
        - Cantabrian (co-dialect with Spanish)
        - Leonese
        - Mirandese
        - Extremaduran (co-dialect with Spanish)
      - Catalan
        - Eastern Catalan
          - Northern Catalan
          - Central Catalan
        - Western Catalan
          - North-Western Catalan
          - Valencian
          - Ribagorçan (co-dialect with Aragonese)
            - Benasquese (co-dialect with Aragonese and Gascon Occitan)
      - French
      - Galician-Portuguese
        - Galician
        - Eonavian
        - Fala
        - Portuguese
          - Portuguese dialects
          - Minderico
      - Spanish (or Castilian)
        - Spanish dialects and varieties
  - Germanic languages
    - Anglic
      - English (Gibraltar)
- Mixed languages
  - Caló (Ibero-Romance Romani)
    - Spanish Caló
    - Catalan Caló
    - Portuguese Calão
  - Erromintxela (Basque Romani)
  - Barranquenho
  - Llanito
- Sign languages
  - Spanish Sign Language
  - Catalan/Valencian Sign Language
  - Portuguese Sign Language
  - French Sign Language

=== By country ===
- Andorra:
  - Catalan (official recognition)
  - Spanish
  - French
- France (Pyrénées-Orientales):
  - French (official recognition)
  - French Sign Language (official recognition)
  - Catalan (official recognition)
  - Occitan (not in the Iberian Peninsula, official recognition)
- (United Kingdom) Gibraltar (UK dependency):
  - English (official recognition)
  - British Sign Language
  - Spanish
  - Llanito
- Portugal:
  - Portuguese (official recognition)
  - Portuguese Sign Language (official recognition)
  - Mirandese (only spoken in a small eastern area of the Norte region, near Portuguese-Spanish border; official recognition)
  - Barranquenho (spoken in the town of Barrancos, near Portuguese–Spanish border; recognized and protected)
  - Minderico (only spoken in the town of Minde)
- Spain:
  - Spanish (also called Castilian, official recognition)
  - Spanish Sign Language (official recognition)
  - Catalan (official recognition; called Valencian in the Valencian Community).
  - Catalan Sign Language (official recognition)
  - Valencian Sign Language (official recognition)
  - Galician (official recognition) and Fala
  - Eonavian (also called Galician-asturian, official recognition)
  - Basque (official recognition)
  - Aragonese (official recognition)
  - Asturian (also called Bable, official recognition)
  - Cantabrian
  - Leonese (official recognition)
  - Extremaduran
  - Occitan (not in the Iberian Peninsula, locally called Aranese, official recognition)
  - Moroccan Arabic (not in the Iberian Peninsula)
  - Riffian Berber (not in the Iberian Peninsula)

==== Usage of co-official languages in Spain ====
Map of co-official languages in Spain

Speakers of official languages in the Spanish autonomous communities (as a % of each region's population)
Autonomous community	Co-official languages	Co-official language speakers
Balearic Islands (2011)	Catalan	71.5%
Basque Country (2011)	Basque	32.0%
Catalonia (2011)	Catalan	80.9%
Galicia (2007)	Galician	89.3%
Navarre (2011)	Basque	11.7%
Valencian Community (2011)	Valencian	58.4%
Asturias	Asturian language	42.0%

== See also ==
- Languages of Andorra
- Languages of Spain
- Languages of France
- Languages of Portugal
- Languages of Gibraltar
- Iberian Romance languages
- Pre-Roman peoples of the Iberian Peninsula
- Balearic Catalan
