= Alavese dialect =

Dialect of Basque

Alavese
- Arabako euskara
- Native to: Spain
- Region: Álava
- Extinct: (date missing)
- Language family: Basque (language isolate): Alavese
- Dialects: Western, Eastern

Language codes
- ISO 639-3: –
- Glottolog: aval1237 Alavan
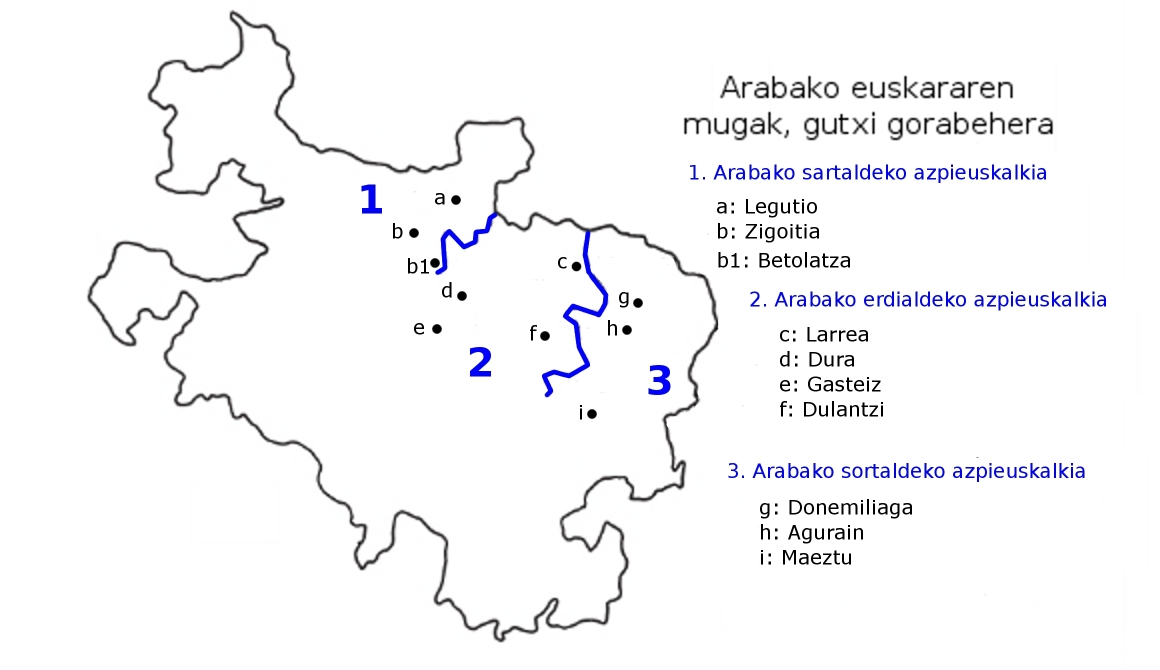
- Approximate extent of the Alavese dialect of Basque between the 16th and 18th century

Alavese (Basque: Arabako euskara, Spanish: vasco alavés) is an extinct dialect of the Basque language spoken formerly in Álava, one of the provinces of the Basque Country of Spain. The modern-day communities of Aramaio and Legutio along the northern border with Biscay do not speak the Alavese dialect but a variant of the Biscayan dialect instead, and while overall some 25% of people in Álava today are Basque speakers, the majority of these are speakers of Standard Basque who acquired Basque via the education system or moved there from other parts of the Basque Country.

== Classification and features ==
In 1997, Professor Koldo Zuazo published research carried out on scattered recorded evidence and papers drawn up especially by Koldo Mitxelena. He outlines three main linguistic areas running north to south, where features related to Western and Navarrese dialects mix up to different degrees according to their geographical position.

His work focuses mainly on relevant lexico-morphological differences, such as instrumental -gaz/rekin and ablative -rean/tik case markers and sound variations such as barria/berria (= 'new'), elexea/elizea (= 'church'), padura/madura (= 'swamp').

== Attestation ==
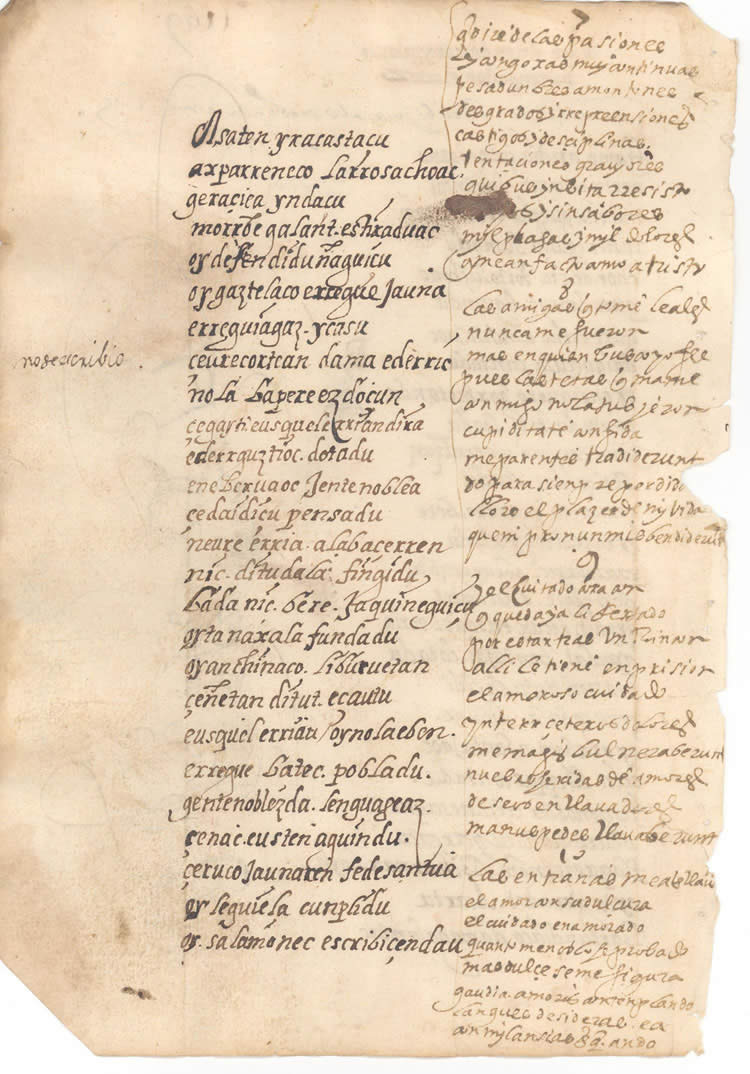
A page from the Lazarraga manuscript written in the Alavese dialect

The Alavese dialect is not well attested. Prior to the discovery of the Lazarraga manuscript in 2004, to date the only known piece of prose written in the Alavese dialect, the only sources were:

- substrate terms in Alavese Spanish
- a handful of terms found on Basque funeral steles
- a 16th century vocabulary written by the Italian Nicolao Landuchio in 1562 in Vitoria-Gasteiz entitled Dictionarium linguae cantabricae - Bocabularioa ezqueraz jaquiteco eta ezqueraz verba eguiteco
- the 1596 Doctrina Christiana en Romanze y Basquenze by Joan Perez Betolatza from Betolaza.

Pottery shards with apparently Basque inscriptions discovered at an archeological dig in Iruña-Veleia west of Vitoria-Gasteiz were later discovered to be forgeries.

== See also ==
- Basque dialects
- Errementari a 2017 Basque film where a recreated version of the dialect is used as main language through the whole film.
