= Pierre Lhande =

Pierre Lhande Heguy
- Born: 9 July 1877; Bayonne, Labourd, France
- Died: 17 April 1957 (aged 79); Tardets, Soule, France
- Occupations: Priest, writer
- Writing career
- Notable work: Dictionnaire basque-français • L'emigration basque • Le Pays basque à vol d'oiseau • Mirentchu

Pierre Lhande Heguy (Basque: Pierre Allande Hegi) was a French writer. He was born in Bayonne, France on 9 July 1877 and died 17 April 1957 in Tardets, Soule; for unknown reasons he was given his grandfather's surname, Lhande, as opposed to his father's surname Basagaitz.

== Biography ==
At the age of 8 when Lhande's father died he moved to Sauguis-Saint-Étienne in Soule with his mother. A young man, he joined the Seminary of Bayonne but was subsequently expelled due to his pre-occupation with poetry and the Basque language. He then joined the Jesuits of Rodez and moved to Belgium and later the Netherlands with the order. After a teaching spell in El Puerto de Santa María, he returned to Belgium and was ordained in August 1910. He returned to Hondarribia in the Northern Basque Country in 1911. He would remain in the Basque Country until his death in 1957 in the Saint-Antoine à Tardets home.

== Works ==
The author of numerous pieces of writing, he is perhaps best known for his monumental 1926 Dictionnaire Basque-Français of the Northern Basque dialects Labourdin, Lower Navarrese and Souletin.
