= Roncalese dialect =

Extinct Basque dialect

Roncalese
- Erronkariera
- Native to: Spain
- Region: Roncal, Navarre
- Extinct: 1991
- Language family: Basque: Eastern Navarrese; Roncalese

Language codes
- ISO 639-3: –
- Glottolog: ronc1236
- Roncalese

Roncalese (in Basque: erronkariera, in Roncalese dialect: Erronkariko uskara) is an extinct Basque dialect once spoken in the Roncal Valley in Navarre, Spanish Basque Country. It is a subdialect of Eastern Navarrese in the classification of Koldo Zuazo. It had been classified as a subdialect of Souletin (otherwise spoken in the province of Soule in the French Basque Country) in the 19th-century classification of Louis Lucien Bonaparte, and as a separate dialect in the early-20th-century classification of Resurrección María de Azkue. The last speaker of the Roncalese, Fidela Bernat, died in 1991.

Roncalese preserves historical nasals which have been lost from other dialects, a fact which has proven valuable in discrediting the aizkora theory (that Basque vocabulary is continuous from the Stone Age).

== Text ==
| Roncalese | Standard Basque (Batua) |
|---|---|
| I Gaierdia da. Errege Karlomagno Aurizperrin dago bere ejerzito guziuarekin: ez dago goikorik ez izarrik zeurian; urrisaiarat brillatan dei suek mendien erdian. Frankoek kantatan dei hirian, otsoek marraka egiten dei Altabizkarrean eta bitartio uskaldunek xorroxtan ditei beren dardo eta aizkorak Ibañetako peina eta harrietan II; Karkomituruk Karlomagnok ez du lorik egiten; ohe sahitsean bere pajexko batek leitan du amoriozko historia bat; urrinxago, Erroldan fuerteak xahitan du ezpata famatiua Durandarte eta Turpin arzobispo onak errezatan du Jangoikoaren Ama saintiuari. III — Ene pajexkoa — erran zaun Errege Karlomagnok; — zer arroitu da kori haustan baitu gaiazko isiltarzuna? — Jeina — erresponditu zaun pajeak; — Dira Iratiko, itxasoa bino handiagoko, oxanaren hostoak, airearekin mobitan baitira. — A! gazte maitea, urudu du hiltearen hiragoa eta ene bihotza lotsatan da. IV; Gaia dago goikorik eta izarrik bage; suek brillatan dei mendien erdian; frankoek lo egiten dei Aurizperrin; otsoek marraka egiten dei Altabizkarrean eta uskaldunek xorroxtan ditei beren dardo eta aizkorak Ibañetako peinetan. V Zer arroitu da kori? — Berriz galtegin zion Karlomagnok, eta pajeak, loak harturuk, ez zaun erresponditu. — Jeina — erran zion Erroldan fuerteak; — da mendiko ugaltea, da Andresaroko ardi saldoen marraka. — Urudu da suspiro bat — erran zion errege frankoak. — Kala da, Jeina — erresponditu zaun Erroldanek; — Herri konek nexar egiten du gutaz guartan denean. VI; Karlomagnok inkietaturuk ez du lorik egiten; lurra ta zeuriak daude argirik bage; otsoek marraka egiten dei Altabizkarren; uskaldunen aizkorek eta dardoek Ibañetako haretx artetan brillatan dei. VII; A! — suspiratan du Karlomagnok. — Ez doked lorik egin; kalenturak ixikitan nu. Zer arroitu da kori? — Eta Erroldanek, loak harturuk, ez zaun erresponditu. — Jeina — erran zion Turpin onak; — erreza ezazu, erreza ezazu enekin. Arroitu kori da gerra kantu Uskaldunerriarena, eta egun da gore azken zeuriguna. VIII; Iguzkiak mendietan brillatan du. Karlomagno banzituruk ezkapatan da “bere pluma beltx eta bere kapa gorriarekin”. Haurrak eta emazteak dantzatan dira Ibañetan. Ez dago ja extranjerorik Uskaldun Herrian eta montañesen irrintziriak zeuriaraino igaiten dira. | I Gauerdia da. Karlomagno erregea Aurizberrin dago bere armada guziarekin: zeruan ez da ageri ez ilargirik eta ez izarrik; urrunera su handi batzuk argitzen dute mendien artean. Frankoek kantatzen dute herrian, Altabizkarreko inguruan senti dira otsoen lotsagarrizko ainuriak (marrakak) eta euskaldunek zorrozten dituzte arte honetan (bitartean) beren dardo eta aizkorak Ibañetako haitz eta harrietan. II; Antsiarekin Karlomagnok ezin ahal izan du loa bildu beregana; ohe (ohatze) saihetsean bere pajexko batek leitzen du amodiozko kontu (istorio) bat; urruntxeago, Erroldan indartsuak garbitzen (xahutzen) du bere Durandarte ezpata famatua eta Turpin arzobispo onak errezatzen dio Jaungoikoaren Ama sainduari. III — Ene pajexkoa — erran zion Errege Karlomagnok; — zer da gauazko isiltasuna hausten duen arroitu hori? — Jauna — errespondatu zion pajeak; — Iratiko, itsasoa baino handiagoko, oihanaren hostoak dira, haizeak mugiturik. — A! gazte maitea, irudi du hiltzearen oihua (heiagora) eta ene bihotza beldur (lotsatzen) da. IV; Gaua guziz ilun dago. Ez da ageri ez ilargirik eta ez izarrik zeruetan; urrunera su handi batzuk argitzen dute mendien artean; frankoak lo daude Aurizberrin; Altabizkarreko inguruan otsoak ainuriaz (marrakaz) daude eta euskaldunek zorrozten dituzte beren dardo eta aizkorak Ibañetako haitzetan. V Zer da arroitu hori? — galdegin zuen berriz Karlomagnok, eta pajeak, loak errenditurik (harturik), ez zion errespondatu. — Jauna —erran zuen Erroldan indartsuak; — mendiko ugaldea da, Andresaroko ardi saldoen marraka da. — Suspirio bat irudi du — erran zuen errege frankoak. — Hala da, Jauna — errespondatu zion Erroldanek; — Herri honek negar egiten du gutaz oroitzen (ohartzen) denean. VI; Antsiarekin Karlomagnok ezin ahal izan du loa bildu beregana; lurra ta zeruak argirik gabe daude; otsoak ainuriaz (marrakaz) daude Altabizkarren; euskaldunen aizkorek eta dardoek argitzen dute Ibañetako haritzen artean. VII; A! — suspiratzen du Karlomagnok. — Ez dezaket lorik egin; kalenturak (sukarrak) erretzen (izekitzen) nau. Zer da arroitu hori? — Eta Erroldanek, loak errenditurik (harturik), ez zion errespondatu. — Jauna —erran zuen Turpin onak; — erreza ezazu, erreza ezazu enekin. Arroitu hori Euskal Herriko gerla kantua da eta egun gure gloriaren azken eguna da. VIII; Eguzkiak argitzen ditu mendiak. Irabazirik Karlomagno ihesi joaten da “bere pluma beltz eta bere kapa gorriarekin”. Haurrak eta emazteak dantzatzen dira kontentuz beterik Ibañetan. Kanpokorik ez da ja Euskal Herrian eta menditarren irrintziak zeruetaraino igaten dira. |

== See also ==
- Basque dialects
