= Basque dialects =

Varieties of the Basque language

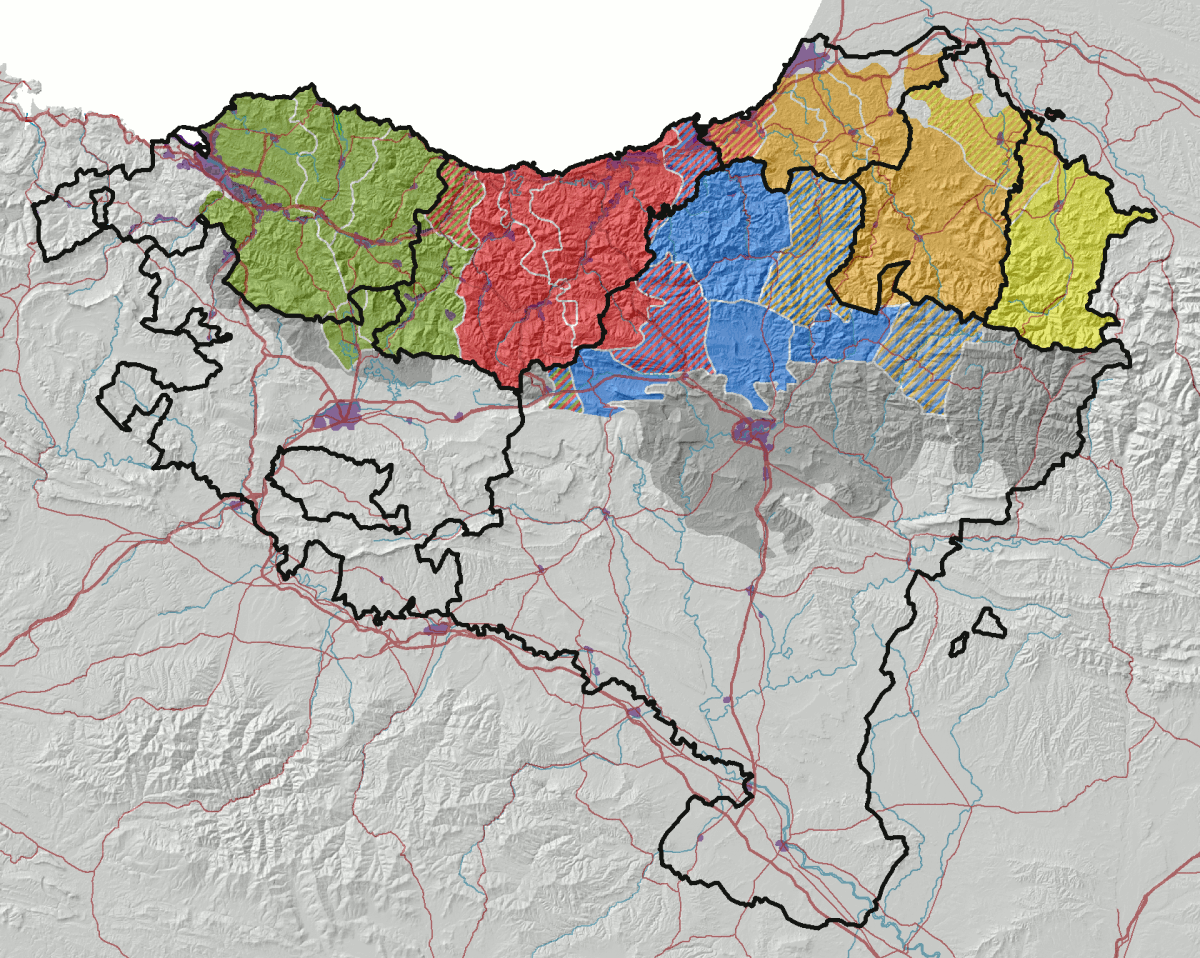
The modern dialects of Basque, according to Koldo Zuazo: Western (Biscayan) Central (Gipuzkoan) (Upper) Navarrese Navarro-Lapurdian Souletin other Basque areas ca 1850 (Bonaparte)

Basque dialects are linguistic varieties of the Basque language which differ in pronunciation, vocabulary and grammar from each other and from Standard Basque. Between six and nine Basque dialects have been historically distinguished:

- Biscayan
- Gipuzkoan
- Upper Navarrese (Northern and Southern)
- Lower Navarrese (Eastern and Western)
- Lapurdian
- Souletin (Souletin and Roncalese)

In modern times, however, both Lower Navarrese and Lapurdian are considered part of a Navarrese–Lapurdian dialect, so there would be five dialects, divided into 11 subdialects and 24 minor varieties.

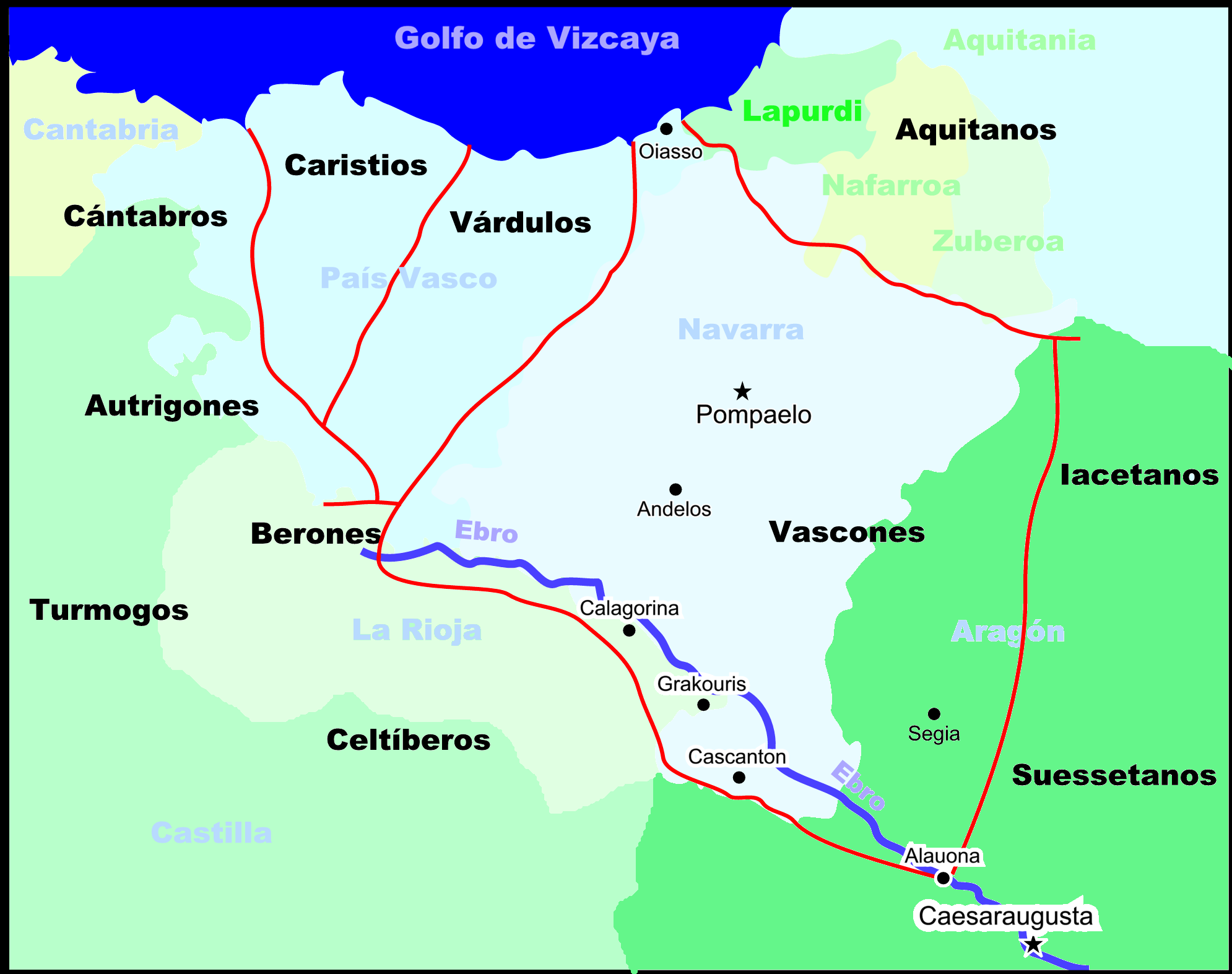
The pre-Roman tribal boundaries in the general area of the modern-day Basque Country.

The boundaries of all these dialects do not coincide directly with current political or administrative boundaries. It was believed that the dialect boundaries between Bizkaian, Gipuzkoan and Upper Navarrese showed some relation to some pre-Roman tribal boundaries between the Caristii, Varduli and Vascones. However, main Basque dialectologists now deny any direct relation between those tribes and Basque dialects. It seems that these dialects were created in the Middle Ages from a previously quite unified Basque language, and the dialects diverged from each other since then as a result of the administrative and political division that happened in the Basque Country.

== History of Basque dialectology ==
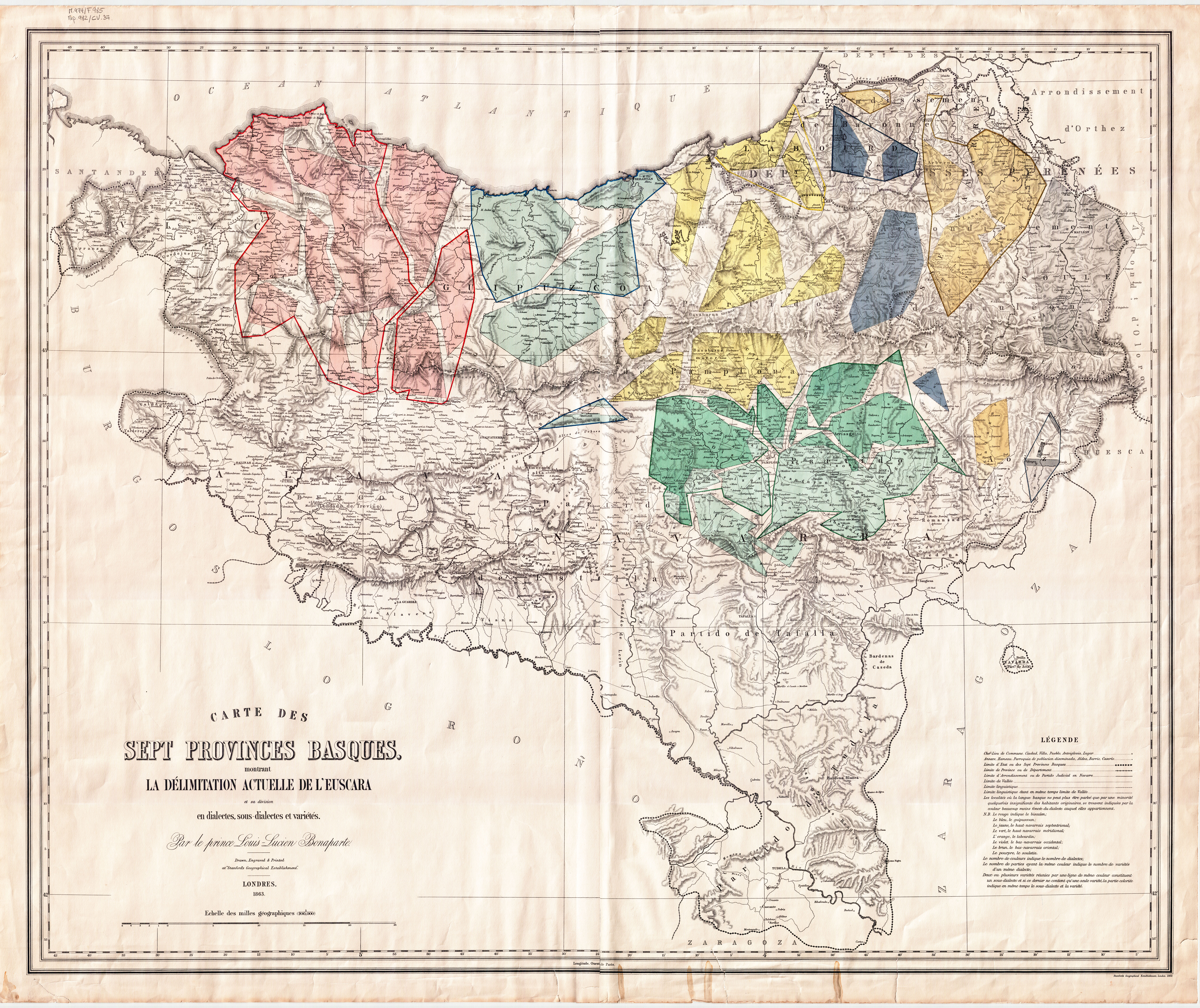
Louis-Lucien Bonaparte's original 1866 map of Basque dialects.

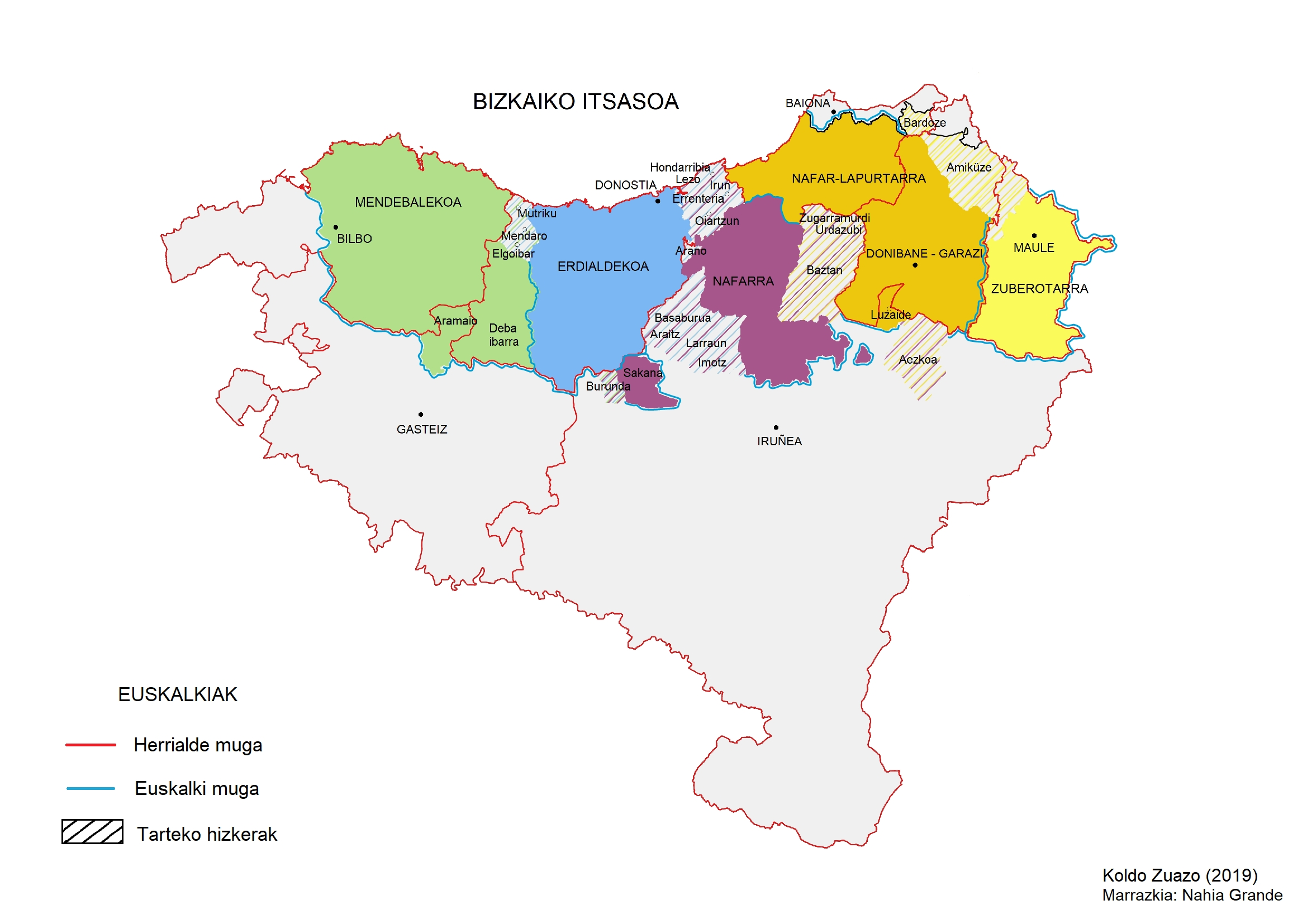
Map of Basque dialects (Koldo Zuazo, 2019)

One of the first scientific studies of Basque dialects, regarding the auxiliary verb forms, was made by Louis-Lucien Bonaparte, a nephew of Napoleon Bonaparte. His original dialect map, Carte des Sept Provinces Basques, was published in 1863 along with his Le Verbe Basque en Tableaux was regarded as the authoritative guide in Basque dialectology for a century. He collected his data in fieldwork between 1856 and 1869 in five visits to the Basque Country. By then, the Basque language was in retreat throughout the territory in which it had been commonly spoken. In Álava, Basque had all but vanished from the Plains and the Highlands, remaining only in the stronghold of Aramaio and bordering fringes of Biscay and Gipuzkoa, while in Navarre the scholar collected the last live evidence in areas extending as far south as Tafalla.

In 1998, Koldo Zuazo, Professor of Basque Philology at the University of the Basque Country, redefined the dialect classifications slightly. For example, he changed the name of Biscayan to Western, Gipuzkoan to Central, Upper Navarrese to Navarrese. He also grouped Lapurdian with Lower Navarrese, distinguished Eastern Navarrese as an independent dialect, and recognised several mixed areas:

- Western (Biscayan)
- Central (Gipuzkoan)
- (Upper) Navarrese
- Eastern Navarrese (including Salazarese and the extinct Roncalese)
- Navarrese–Lapurdian
- Souletin

Some research has also been carried out on the Basque dialect spoken formerly in Álava which appears to mix Western and Navarrese features.

Key distinguishing features in Basque dialect phonology include:

- loss of /h/ and aspirated stops in Southern Basque dialects
- divergence of historic /j/ into /j/ /ɟ/ /ʒ/ /ʃ/ /x/ /χ/
- Souletin development of the vowel /y/

== Morphological variation ==
Modern Basque dialects show a high degree of dialectal divergence. However, cross-dialectal communication even without prior knowledge of either Standard Basque or the other dialect is normally possible to a reasonable extent, with the notable of exception of Zuberoan (also called Souletin), which is regarded as the most divergent Basque dialect.

The names for the language in the dialects of Basque (Euskara in Standard Basque) for example exemplify to some degree the dialectal fragmentation of the Basque speaking area. The most divergent forms are generally found in the Eastern dialects.

Dialect variant	Dialect group	Areas documented in
Auskera	Upper Navarrese	Arakil
Eskara	Upper Navarrese; Lapurdian	Irun; Saint-Jean-de-Luz
Eskoara	Biscayan	Orozko
Eskuara	Lapurdian; Biscayan; Lower Navarrese	Labourd; Biscay; Lower Navarre
Eskuera	Biscayan; Gipuzkoan	Gernika, Bermeo, Bergara, Leintz-Gatzaga; Goierri, Burunda, Etxarri-Aranaz
Euskala	Biscayan	Bergara, Leintz-Gatzaga
Euskara	Upper Navarrese; Aezcoan	Irun, Larraun, Erro
Euskera	Biscayan; Gipuzkoan; Upper Navarrese	
Euskiera	Biscayan	Orozko
Euzkera	Biscayan	Arrigorriaga, Orozko, Marquina, Bergara, Leintz-Gatzaga
Oskara	Upper Navarrese	Arakil
Uskara	Upper Navarrese; Aezcoan; Eastern Navarrese dialect	Irun, Bortziriak, Ultzama, Aezkoa, Salazar Valley, Roncal Valley
Üskara	Souletin	
Uskaa	Upper Navarrese; Souletin	Ultzama
Üskaa	Souletin	
Üska	Souletin	
Uskera	Biscayan; Upper Navarrese	Arratia, Orozko; Ultzama, Erro, Olza, Gulina

The following map shows the approximate areas where each word is used. The smaller-type instances are cases of the name being recorded for a particular area, the larger-type instances show super-regional forms common throughout the dialect area in question:

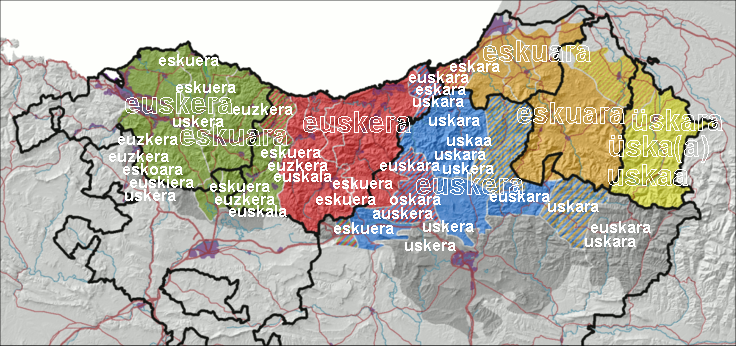
The language name Euskara in the dialects of Basque located on the new dialect map by Koldo Zuazo.

=== Comparison of sample verb forms ===
Comparing the forms of the Basque verb used in the different Basque dialects also gives a good overview over some of the differences and common features.

Standard Basque	Biscayan	Gipuzkoan	Upper Navarrese	Roncalese	Lapurdian	Lower Navarrese	Souletin	English
naiz haiz da gara zara zarete dira	naz az da gara zara zarie dira	naiz aiz da ge(r)a ze(r)a ze(r)ate di(r)a	naiz (y)aiz da ga(r)a za(r)a za(r)ate di(r)e	naz yaz da gra zra zrei dra	naiz haiz da gare zare zaizte di(r)e	n(a)iz h(a)iz da gira zira zirezte dira	niz hiz da gi(r)a zi(r)a zi(r)ae di(r)a	I am you (familiar) are (s)he/it is we are you (formal) are you (plural) are they are
dut dun duk du dugu duzu duzue dute	dot don dok dau dogu dozu dozue dabe	det den dek du degu dezu dezu(t)e du(t)e	dut dun duk du dugu duzu duzue dute	dur, dud dun duk du digu tzu tzei dei	dut dun duk du dugu duzu duzue dute	dut dun duk du dugu duzu duzue (d)ute	düt dün dük dü dügü düzü düzüe düe	I have it you (familiar, allocutive form for female addressee) have it you (familiar, allocutive form for male addressee) have it (s)he/it has it we have it you (formal) have it you (plural) have it they have it
nion hion zion genion zenion zenioten zioten	neutsan euntsan eutsan geuntsan zeuntsan zeuntsoen eutsoen	nion ion zion genion zenion zenioten zioten	nio(n) (y)io(n) zio(n) ginio(n) zinio(n) ziniote(n) ziote(n)	naun yaun zaun ginaun zinaun zinabein zabein	nion hion zion ginion zinion zinioten zioten	nakon hakon zakon ginakon zinakon zinakoten zakoten	neion heion zeion geneion zeneion zeneioen zeioen	I to him/her/it (trans.); for example eman nion "I gave it to him" you (familiar) to him/her/it (trans.) (s)he/it to him/her/it (trans.) we to him/her/it (trans.) you (formal) to him/her/it (trans.) you (plural) to him/her/it (trans.) they to him/her/it (trans.)
nindoakion hindoakion zihoakion gindoazkion zindoazkion zindoazkioten zihoazkion	niñoiakion iñoakion joiakion giñoiakiozan ziñoiakiozan ziñoiakiozen joiakiozan	ninjoakion injoakion zijoakion ginjoazkion zinjoazkion zinjoazkioten zijoazkion			nindoakion hindoakion zoakion ginoazkion zinoazkion zinoazkioten zoazkion		nindoakion hindoakion zoakion gindoazkion zindoakion zindoakioen zoazkion	I went to him/her/it you (familiar) went to him/her/it (s)he/it went to him/her/it we went to him/her/it you (formal) went to him/her/it you (plural) went to him/her/it they went to him/her/it

== Phonological variation ==
Standard Basque consonants
		Labial	Dental/ Alveolar	Postalveolar /Palatal	Velar
Nasal		m	n	ɲ	
Plosive	voiceless	p	t	c	k
Plosive	voiced	b	d	ɟ	ɡ
Affricate	voiceless		ts̺ ts̻	tʃ	
Fricative	voiceless	f	s̺ s̻	ʃ	x
Trill			r		
Tap			ɾ		
Lateral			l	ʎ	

Standard Basque vowels
	Front	Central	Back
Close	i		u
Mid	e		o
Open		a	

Basque dialects all diverge from this standard inventory to a larger or lesser extent. The grapheme j (historically /j/) displays by far the most noticeable divergence, followed by the fricatives and affricates. Hualde (1991) describes the following:

- Baztan, an Eastern Navarrese dialect: lack of /x/
- Arbizu, a dialect in a mixed Gipuzkoan/Western Navarrese dialect area: geminate vowels /i/~/ii/, /e/~/ee/, /a/~/aa/, /o/~/oo/, /u/~/uu/
- Gernika, a Biscayan dialect: merger of /s̻/ with /s̺/ and /ts̻/ with /ts̺/. Additional phonemes: /ʒ/. Lack of /c/ and /ɟ/.
- Ondarroa, a Biscayan dialect: merger of /s̻/ with /s̺/ and /ts̻/ with /ts̺/. Additional phonemes: /dz/. Lack of /c/ and /ɟ/.

== Standardized dialects ==
There have been various attempts throughout history to promote standardised forms of Basque dialects to the level of a common standard Basque.

- A standardised form of Lower Navarrese was the dialect used by influential 16th-century author Joanes Leizarraga.
- Azkue's Gipuzkera Osotua ("Complemented Gipuzkoan"), dating to 1935, attempted, though largely unsuccessfully, to create a standardized Basque based on Gipuzkoan, complemented with elements from other dialects.
- In the 1940s, a group called Jakintza Baitha ("Wisdom House") gathered around the academician Federico Krutwig, who preferred to base the standard on the Lapurdian of Joanes Leizarraga's Protestant Bible and the first printed books in Basque. However, they did not receive support from other Basque language scholars and activists.
- In 1944, Pierre Lafitte published his Navarro-Labourdin Littéraire, based on Classical Lapurdian, which has become the de facto standard form of Lapurdian. It is taught in some schools of Lapurdi and used on radio, in church, and by the newspaper Herria.
- Since 1968, Euskaltzaindia has promulgated a Unified (or Standard) Basque (Euskara batua) based on the central dialects that has successfully spread as the formal dialect of the language. Batua is found in official texts, schools, TV, newspapers and in common parlance by new speakers, especially in the cities, whereas in the countryside, with more elderly speakers, people remain more attached to the natural dialects, especially in informal situations.
- More recently, the distinct dialects of Bizkaian and Zuberoan have also been standardised.

== Bibliography ==
- Allières, Jacques (1979). Manuel pratique de basque. Connaissance des langues, v. 13 (in French). Paris: A. & J. Picard. ISBN 2-7084-0038-X.
- Campion, Arturo (1884). Gramática de los cuatro dialectos literarios de la lengua euskara (in Spanish). Tolosa: Eusebio López – via archive.org.
- Lafitte, Pierre (1962). Grammaire Basque : Navarro-Labourdin littéraire (in French). Donostia/Bayonne: Elkarlanean. ISBN 2-913156-10-X.
