= Eastern Navarrese dialect =

Dialect of Basque

Eastern Navarrese
- Native to: Spain
- Region: Navarre
- Extinct: 1991
- Language family: Basque: Eastern Navarrese
- Dialects: Salazarese; Roncalese

Language codes
- ISO 639-3: –
- Glottolog: None
- Eastern Navarrese dialects are the two tan ones at right

Eastern Navarrese (Ekialdeko nafar euskalkia in Basque) is an extinct Basque dialect spoken in Navarre, Spain. It included two subdialects: Salazarese and Roncalese.

The name of this dialect was proposed by the foremost living Basque dialectologist, Koldo Zuazo, in a new classification of Basque dialects published in 2004. Later on, when the last speakers (of the Salazarese subdialect) died at the beginning of the 21st century, Zuazo retired Eastern Navarrese from the list of living dialects.

== Comparison ==
Salazarese	Roncalese	Standard Basque (Batua)
I Gauerdi da. Errege Karlomagno Aurizperrin dago bere ejerzito guziarekin: zeruan ez da ageri ez ilargirik eta ez izarrik; urruneala su handi batzurek argitzen die mendien artean. Frankoek kantatzen die herrian, Altabizkarreko inguru senti dira otsoen lotsagarrizko ainuriak, uskaldunek txorrosten ditie arte konetan beren dardo eta aizkurak Ibañetako peina eta harrietan. II; Antsiarekin Karlomagnok ezin ahal izan du loa bildu beregana; ohatze sahetsean bere pajexko batek leitzen du amoriozko kontu bat; urruntxeago, Erroldan azkarrak garbitzen du bere Durandarte ezpata famatua eta Turpin arzobispo onak errezatzen du Jangoikoaren Ama sanduari. III — Ene pajexkoa — erran zakon Errege Karlomagnok; — zer da gauazko isiltasuna hausten duen arroitu kori?—Jauna, — errespondatu zakon pajeak; — Dira Iratiko, itxasoa beino handiagoko, oihanaren hostoak, haizeak mogiturik. — A! gazte maitea, iduri du hiltzearen oihua eta ene bihotza beldur da. IV; Gaua guziz ilun dago. Ez da ageri ez ilargirik eta ez izarrik zeruetan; urruneala su handi batzurek argitzen die mendien artean; frankoak lo daude Aurizperrin; Altabizkarreko inguru otsoak ainuriaz daude eta uskaldunek txorroxten ditie beren dardo eta aizkurak Ibañetako peinetan. V Zer da arroitu kori? — galdegin zuen berriz Karlomagnok, eta pajeak, loak errenditurik, ez zakon kontestatu. — Jauna — erran zuen Erroldan azkarrak; — da mendiko ugaldea, da Andresaroko ardi-saldoen marraka. — Suspiro bat iduri du — erran zuen franko erregeak. — Kala da, Jauna — errespondatu zakon Erroldanek; — Herri konek near egiten du gutaz oritzen denean. VI; Antsiarekin Karlomagnok ezin ahal izan du loa bildu beregana; lurra ta zeruak argirik gabe daude; otsoak ainuriaz daude Altabizkarren; uskaldunen aizkurek eta dardoek argitzen die Ibañetako haritzen artean. VII; A! — suspiratzen du Karlomagnok. — Ez doket lorik egin; su batek erretzen nu. Zer da arroitu kori? — Eta Erroldanek, loak errenditurik, ez zakon errespondatu. — Jauna —erran zuen Turpin onak; — erreza ezazu, erreza ezazu enekin. Arroitu kori da Uskal Herriko gerla kantua eta egun da gure gloriaren azken eguna. VIII; Iguzkiak argitzen ditu bizkarrak. Irabazirik Karlomagno ihesi faten da "bere pluma beltz eta bere kapa gorriarekin". Haurrak eta emazteak dantzatzen dira kontentuz beterik Ibañetan. Kanpokorik ez da ja Uskal Herrian eta menditarren irrintziak igaten dira zeruetaraino.	I Gaierdia da. Errege Karlomagno Aurizperrin dago bere ejerzito guziuarekin: ez dago goikorik ez izarrik zeurian; urrisaiarat brillatan dei suek mendien erdian. Frankoek kantatan dei hirian, otsoek marraka egiten dei Altabizkarrean eta bitartio uskaldunek xorroxtan ditei beren dardo eta aizkorak Ibañetako peina eta harrietan II; Karkomituruk Karlomagnok ez du lorik egiten; ohe sahitsean bere pajexko batek leitan du amoriozko historia bat; urrinxago, Erroldan fuerteak xahitan du ezpata famatiua Durandarte eta Turpin arzobispo onak errezatan du Jangoikoaren Ama saintiuari. III — Ene pajexkoa — erran zaun Errege Karlomagnok; — zer arroitu da kori haustan baitu gaiazko isiltarzuna? — Jeina — erresponditu zaun pajeak; — Dira Iratiko, itxasoa bino handiagoko, oxanaren hostoak, airearekin mobitan baitira. — A! gazte maitea, urudu du hiltearen hiragoa eta ene bihotza lotsatan da. IV; Gaia dago goikorik eta izarrik bage; suek brillatan dei mendien erdian; frankoek lo egiten dei Aurizperrin; otsoek marraka egiten dei Altabizkarrean eta uskaldunek xorroxtan ditei beren dardo eta aizkorak Ibañetako peinetan. V Zer arroitu da kori? — Berriz galtegin zion Karlomagnok, eta pajeak, loak harturuk, ez zaun erresponditu. — Jeina — erran zion Erroldan fuerteak; — da mendiko ugaltea, da Andresaroko ardi saldoen marraka. — Urudu da suspiro bat — erran zion errege frankoak. — Kala da, Jeina — erresponditu zaun Erroldanek; — Herri konek nexar egiten du gutaz guartan denean. VI; Karlomagnok inkietaturuk ez du lorik egiten; lurra ta zeuriak daude argirik bage; otsoek marraka egiten dei Altabizkarren; uskaldunen aizkorek eta dardoek Ibañetako haretx artetan brillatan dei. VII; A! — suspiratan du Karlomagnok. — Ez doked lorik egin; kalenturak ixikitan nu. Zer arroitu da kori? — Eta Erroldanek, loak harturuk, ez zaun erresponditu. — Jeina — erran zion Turpin onak; — erreza ezazu, erreza ezazu enekin. Arroitu kori da gerra kantu Uskaldunerriarena, eta egun da gore azken zeuriguna. VIII; Iguzkiak mendietan brillatan du. Karlomagno banzituruk ezkapatan da "bere pluma beltx eta bere kapa gorriarekin". Haurrak eta emazteak dantzatan dira Ibañetan. Ez dago ja extranjerorik Uskaldun Herrian eta montañesen irrintziriak zeuriaraino igaiten dira.	I Gauerdia da. Karlomagno erregea Aurizberrin dago bere armada guziarekin: zeruan ez da ageri ez ilargirik eta ez izarrik; urrunera su handi batzuk argitzen dute mendien artean. Frankoek kantatzen dute herrian, Altabizkarreko inguruan senti dira otsoen lotsagarrizko ainuriak (marrakak) eta euskaldunek zorrozten dituzte arte honetan (bitartean) beren dardo eta aizkorak Ibañetako haitz eta harrietan. II; Antsiarekin Karlomagnok ezin ahal izan du loa bildu beregana; ohe (ohatze) saihetsean bere pajexko batek leitzen du amodiozko kontu (istorio) bat; urruntxeago, Erroldan indartsuak garbitzen (xahutzen) du bere Durandarte ezpata famatua eta Turpin arzobispo onak errezatzen dio Jaungoikoaren Ama sainduari. III — Ene pajexkoa — erran zion Errege Karlomagnok; — zer da gauazko isiltasuna hausten duen arroitu hori? — Jauna — errespondatu zion pajeak; — Iratiko, itsasoa baino handiagoko, oihanaren hostoak dira, haizeak mugiturik. — A! gazte maitea, irudi du hiltzearen oihua (heiagora) eta ene bihotza beldur (lotsatzen) da. IV; Gaua guziz ilun dago. Ez da ageri ez ilargirik eta ez izarrik zeruetan; urrunera su handi batzuk argitzen dute mendien artean; frankoak lo daude Aurizberrin; Altabizkarreko inguruan otsoak ainuriaz (marrakaz) daude eta euskaldunek zorrozten dituzte beren dardo eta aizkorak Ibañetako haitzetan. V Zer da arroitu hori? — galdegin zuen berriz Karlomagnok, eta pajeak, loak errenditurik (harturik), ez zion errespondatu. — Jauna —erran zuen Erroldan indartsuak; — mendiko ugaldea da, Andresaroko ardi saldoen marraka da. — Suspirio bat irudi du — erran zuen errege frankoak. — Hala da, Jauna — errespondatu zion Erroldanek; — Herri honek negar egiten du gutaz oroitzen (ohartzen) denean. VI; Antsiarekin Karlomagnok ezin ahal izan du loa bildu beregana; lurra ta zeruak argirik gabe daude; otsoak ainuriaz (marrakaz) daude Altabizkarren; euskaldunen aizkorek eta dardoek argitzen dute Ibañetako haritzen artean. VII; A! — suspiratzen du Karlomagnok. — Ez dezaket lorik egin; kalenturak (sukarrak) erretzen (izekitzen) nau. Zer da arroitu hori? — Eta Erroldanek, loak errenditurik (harturik), ez zion errespondatu. — Jauna —erran zuen Turpin onak; — erreza ezazu, erreza ezazu enekin. Arroitu hori Euskal Herriko gerla kantua da eta egun gure gloriaren azken eguna da. VIII; Eguzkiak argitzen ditu mendiak. Irabazirik Karlomagno ihesi joaten da "bere pluma beltz eta bere kapa gorriarekin". Haurrak eta emazteak dantzatzen dira kontentuz beterik Ibañetan. Kanpokorik ez da ja Euskal Herrian eta menditarren irrintziak zeruetaraino igaten dira.
