= Gipuzkoan dialect =

Dialect of Basque

Gipuzkoan
- Gipuzkera
- Native to: Spain
- Region: Gipuzkoa, Navarre
- Language family: Basque (language isolate): Gipuzkoan

Language codes
- ISO 639-3: –
- Glottolog: guip1235
- IETF: eu-u-sd-esss

Gipuzkoan (Basque: Gipuzkera; Spanish: Guipuzcoano) is a dialect of the Basque language spoken mainly in the central and eastern parts of the province of Gipuzkoa in Basque Country and also in the northernmost part of Navarre. It is a central dialect of Basque according to the traditional dialectal classification of the language based on research carried out by Lucien Bonaparte in the 19th century. He included varieties spoken in the Sakana and Burunda valleys also in the Gipuzkoan dialect, however this approach has been disputed by modern Basque linguists.

== Area ==
Gipuzkoan is spoken not in all of Gipuzkoa but in the area between the Deba River and the River Oiartzun. The strip of Gipuzkoa from Leintz-Gatzaga to Elgoibar is part of the Biscayan (Western) dialect area, and the River Oiartzun flowing past Errenteria outlines the border with the Upper Navarrese dialect. However, borders between Gipuzkoan and High Navarrese are gradually disappearing, as Standard Basque is beginning to blur the differences among traditional dialects, especially for younger Basques.

== Features ==
Regional realizations of ⟨j⟩.

Some of the features of Gipuzkoan, as perceived by speakers of other dialect, are the following:

- The grapheme ⟨j⟩, which is highly variable among Basque dialects, is generally [x] (e.g. [xaˈkin] vs [ʝaˈkin], jakin).
- The verb for 'to go' is pronounced jun ([ˈxun]), as opposed to the general joan ([ˈʝoan]).
- The auxiliary verb forms are det, dek, dezu etc., as opposed to general Basque dut (Biscayan: dot).
- Verb infinitives end with -tu, (bizitu, bialdu, etc.), frequent in central dialects, as opposed to the older -i (bizi, bi(d)ali etc.).
- The root ending of nouns -a is often interpreted as an article and dropped in indefinite phrases: gauz bat vs gauza bat (transl. one thing).
- The postalveolar affricate /t͡ʃ/ (spelled ⟨tx⟩) replaces the lamino-dental fricative /s̻/ (spelled ⟨z⟩) at the beginning of words. For example: txulo vs zulo, txuri vs zuri.

== Variants ==
Gipuzkoan had four main variants:

- The Beterri variant (from the area surrounding Tolosa, towards San Sebastián).
- The Goierri variant.
- The Urola variant (from Zarautz to Mutriku).
- Navarrese Gipuzkoan (Burunda, Echarri-Aranaz).

== Historical role ==
Gipuzkoan is one of the four dialects known as the literary dialects of Basque (Biscayan, Lapurdian, Souletin and Gipuzkoan). It was used in Basque literature from the 17th century onward, but like Souletin and Biscayan, it had only a minor role because of the Lapurdian dialect's dominance. That was because the centre of Basque literary production was in Labourd from the 16th century to most of the 18th century.

== Source of Standard Basque ==
Gipuzkoan vocabulary was used as the main source for Standard Basque, the standardised dialect of Basque that is used in schools and the media.

== See also ==
- Basque dialects
- Batua (Standard Basque)
- Euskaltzaindia, the Royal Academy of the Basque Language
