= Navarro-Lapurdian dialect =

Dialect of Basque

Navarro-Labourdin
- Lower Navarrese–Labourdin
- Native to: France
- Region: Lower Navarre & Labourd
- Native speakers: (68,000 cited 1991)
- Language family: Basque (language isolate): Navarro-Labourdin
- Dialects: Lapurdian; Western Lower Navarrese; Eastern Lower Navarrese

Language codes
- ISO 639-3: bqe (merged into eus in 2007)
- Glottolog: basq1249
- Navarro-Lapurdian Salazarese

Navarro-Labourdin or Navarro-Lapurdian (Basque: nafar-lapurtera) is a Basque dialect spoken in the Lower Navarre and Labourd (Lapurdi) former provinces of the French Basque Country (in the Pyrénées Atlantiques département). It consists of two dialects in older classifications, Lower Navarrese and Labourdin. It differs somewhat from Upper Navarrese spoken in the Peninsular Basque Country.

Lower Navarrese or Low Navarrese (Standard Basque: behe-nafarrera) is actually two subdialects, eastern and western; the western dialect continues into eastern Labourd. Labourdin (French labourdin; Standard Basque lapurtera, locally lapurtara) is spoken in western Lapurdi.

Labourdin is felt by speakers of other dialect to be clear-cut and elegant, retaining like other northern Basque dialects the consonant /h/, and it was used along with Gipuzkoan and High Navarrese in the creation of the Batua, a standardised form of Basque intended for teaching and the media.

Classic Labourdin was a literary language of the 17th century, used by authors such as Axular. The type of syllable stress in Hondarribian Basque is considered to be a remainder of the one that may have been used in Classic Lapurdian.

Salazarese, spoken in Spain, was once thought to be a subdialect of Navarro-Lapurdian, but it is now classified as Eastern Navarrese.
