= Errementari =

2018 film by Paul Urkijo

- Basque theatrical release poster
- Directed by: Paul Urkijo Alijo
- Written by: Paul Urkijo Alijo; Asier Guerricaechebarría
- Produced by: Paul Urkijo
- Starring: Kandido Uranga; Uma Bracaglia; Eneko Sagardoy; Zigor Bilbao; Agung Bagus; Unax Gonzalez; Asier Oruesagasti; Jon Ander Alonso; Almudena Cid; Lisa Costanza
- Music by: Pascal Gaigne
- Production companies: Kinoskopik Film Produktion; Pokeepsie Films; Gariza Films; Nadie es Perfecto; Ikusgarri Films; The Project
- Distributed by: Filmax Netflix
- Release dates: October 12, 2017 (Sitges); March 2, 2018 (Spain)
- Running time: 1:38:00
- Countries: Spain; France
- Language: Alavese Basque

Errementari, also known as The Blacksmith and the Devil, is a 2017 internationally co-produced Basque-language period fantasy horror film directed by Paul Urkijo Alijo and written by Alijo and Asier Guerricaechebarría. The plot is based on the Basque folktale version of The Smith and the Devil, as collected by Father Joxemiel Barandiaran. The film sets the legend in 1843, with a blacksmith holding a demon in captivity, and an orphan girl who releases the demon from its cage.

== Plot ==
In 1835 in Araba, during the First Carlist War, rebels are captured by government soldiers and executed. One rebel, Francisco Patxi, survives with the aid of a demon and slays the soldiers.

Eight years later, government investigator Alfredo Ortiz arrives in Araba. He searches for Patxi, who now lives in a ruined forge in the woods. The nearby villagers avoid the forge due to rumours that Patxi murdered his wife and kidnaps young children. The villagers mistrust Ortiz as the government melted down all their metal during the war to make weapons, including their church bell. Benito, a boy from the village, steals a letter proving Ortiz is searching for gold that vanished during the war.

Usue, an orphan girl with a burn scarred face, is bullied by Benito who throws her doll over Patxi's fence. Ortiz hires men from the village to raid the forge where he suspects Patxi has the missing gold, but are driven away by Patxi while one of the men falls into a bear trap and dies. Usue attempts to retrieve her doll while Patxi disposes of the dead man. Inside the forge, she finds a boy captive in an iron cage, who begs her to steal Patxi's ring of keys to free him. She does so successfully, but the boy retrieves a pitchfork and is revealed to be the demon Sartael. He kidnaps Usue and promises to return her for Patxi's soul, but before he can escape, he is caught in another bear trap while Usue is knocked unconscious. Patxi breaks off one of the demons horns and locks him back in the cage. Benito tells Ortiz that Patxi and a demon have kidnapped Usue. Ortiz rallies the men to save Usue.

Usue wakes up and finds Patxi torturing Sartael, who reveals that he made a deal with Patxi during the late war. Sartael kept Paxti alive during the war, so he could see his wife again. On his return home, Patxi found that his wife had taken a new lover, believing Patxi to be dead. Patxi teaches Usue how to torture demons by throwing chickpeas on the floor, which demons are unable to resist trying to count, and by ringing gold bells blessed by the church.

Usue asks Sartael if he can free her mother Maite from Hell after she committed suicide. Sartael reveals that humans are compelled to enter Hell by their own guilt, and once inside, they can never leave. Sartael is then knocked unconscious by Patxi. The villagers arrive and arrest Patxi while the priest reveals the truth about Patxi. Usue's mother, Maite, was Patxi's wife, but after he returned from the war he found Maite had taken a lover and given birth to Usue. Enraged, Patxi burned Usue's face and murdered her father, while Maite, grief-stricken, hanged herself. Ashamed, Patxi gave Usue to the priest as an orphan, along with a replacement bell he forged for the church.

The villagers find Sartael and Ortiz orders Patxi tortured until he returns the gold. Once alone with Sartael, Ortiz that reveals he is actually Sartael's superior from Hell, the demon Alastor. Alastor reveals that Sartael has been demoted for failing to return to Hell with Patxi's soul. Alastor orders Patxi be hanged so he can collect his soul instead. The villagers, driven to religious hysteria, set fire to the forge. Sartael makes a deal with Usue to search for her mother in Hell if Usue frees him and rings the golden bell. Usue rings the bell, causing Ortiz to reveal his demon face. The two men hanging Patxi do flee, dropping Patxi to the floor. Usue frees Sartael but he is captured by the villagers. The priest slaps Usue for freeing Sartael and insults her mother, so Usue makes a deal with Alastor: her soul in exchange for being taken to her mother in Hell. Alastor agrees to this and kills her.

Grief-stricken, Patxi agrees to let Sartael take him to Hell in exchange for saving Usue. Sartael agrees as he wants revenge against Alastor, but remarks that Patxi will need more than his small golden bell to survive Hell. Patxi reveals that the giant bell that he forged for the church is made from the very gold Ortiz was looking for. Sartael kills Patxi with his pitchfork, taking them both to the gates of Hell where thousands of damned souls are waiting to enter. Patxi finds Usue and fends off the demons guarding the gate. Alastor attacks Patxi but Usue throws Patxi's jar of chickpeas at Alastor who is forced to try to count them. With Alastor's defeat, the gates begin to close. Patxi sends Usue back with Sartael while he decides to remain in Hell to search for Maite.

Usue wakes up back on earth. Sartael, grateful that Usue saved him from his cage, declares to the villagers that Usue was rejected from Hell because she is a true Saint and should be treated with respect. As the villagers gather around Usue, Sartael transforms into a young man and makes his way to the next town. On the way, Sartael is picked by a man travelling by cart and begins to tell him the tale of The Blacksmith, a man so ruthless and cruel that even the Devil himself came to fear and respect him.

In Hell, Patxi forces the gates of Hell open as he begins to search for his wife with his hammer and the golden bell on his back.

== Cast ==
- Kandido Uranga as Francisco Patxi/The Blacksmith
- Uma Bracaglia as Usue
- Eneko Sagardoy as Sartael
- Ramón Agirre as Alfredo Ortiz
- José Ramón Argoitia as Mateo
- Josean Bengoetxea as Santi
- Gotzon Sanchez as Faustino
- Aitor Urcelai as Benito (as Aitor Urtzelai)
- Maite Bastos as Blanca
- Iñigo de la Iglesia as Miguel
- Unax Gonzalez as Asier
- Jon Ander Alonso as Lukas
- Ortzi Acosta as Alastor / Gizon Gaztea 2 / Moloch Demonioa (as Ortzi Acosta Calvo)
- Zigor Bilbao as Nestor / Belfegor Demonioa
- Itziar Ituño as Ana
- Agung Bagus as Gizon Gastea 1
- Naia Garcia as Claudia
- Haizea as Cristina
- Ander Pardo as Soldadua 2
- Borja Amigo as Golik Demonioa
- Iskandar Hamawy as Andrusias Demonioa
- Jordi Llores as Manchubus Demonioa

== Production ==
The film was produced by Kinoskopik Film Produktion, Pokeepsie Films, Gariza Films, Nadie es Perfecto, Ikusgarri Films and The Project. It was shot in the extinct Alavese dialect of Basque.

== Release ==
The film premiered at the 50th Sitges Film Festival in October 2017. Distributed by Filmax, it was theatrically released in Spain on March 2, 2018. It was released on October 12, 2017, on Netflix streaming.

== Accolades ==
Year	Award	Category	Nominee(s)	Result	Ref.
2019	33rd Goya Awards	Best Special Effects	Jon Serrano, David Heras	Nominated	

== See also ==
- The Smith and the Devil
- List of Spanish films of 2018
