= Salazarese dialect =

Critically endangered Basque dialect

Salazarese
- Zaraitzuko uskara
- Native to: Spain
- Region: Salazar Valley, Navarre
- Extinct: 2000s
- Language family: Basque (language isolate): Salazarese

Language codes
- ISO 639-3: –
- Glottolog: None
- Salazarese

Salazarese (locally Zaraitzuko uskara) is the Basque dialect of the Salazar Valley of Navarre, Spain.

In English it is also known as Zaraitzu Basque, the Zaraitzu dialect or Salazar dialect; in Spanish as salacenco and in Basque as Zaraitzuko euskara.

Basque was spoken in the Salazar valley until the first half of the 20th century; ever since, the number of speakers started a dramatic decline. At the time of the 2002 linguistic census, there were only two native speakers, both with ages over 85, and within a few years Salazarese became extinct. However, its features had been documented over the 19th and 20th centuries.

From the 1980s there has been a revival of the Basque language in Spain. As a result, roughly a quarter of the valley's inhabitants now speak Standard Basque. It would be possible to revive the Salazarese dialect to some degree by teaching its features to Batua speakers.

== History ==
=== 18th century ===
Some religious texts were written: the Christian doctrines of Itzalle and Orontze and texts published by Satrustegi.

=== 19th century ===
Apart from more religious texts, there is a wealth of significant research work by Louis-Lucien Bonaparte.

Pedro Jose Sanper translated the Gospel of Matthew. and Jose Urrutia undertook the translation of Arturo Campion's “Orreaga”.

=== 20th century ===
- Ziriako and Federiko Garralda wrote several articles in the magazine "Euskal Esnalea" in the local Basque of Zaraitzu between the years 1911 and 1925, covering different subjects: tales, riddles, passages, local history, veterinary science, traditions and games for children.
- Azkue collected several proverbs and tales in Zaraitzu Basque in his works of Basque folklore and ethnography. Also he collected a significant amount of local words in his dictionary.
- Koldo Mitxelena studied thoroughly the dialect from 1958 onwards.
- Jose Estornes Lasa collected the stories and passages of Zoilo Moso in 1969.
- Koldo Artola has published the audio recordings that he taped between 1975 and 2003 in Zaraitzu.

=== 21st century ===
Aitor Arana has collected the testimonies of Basque-speakers of Zaraitzu, published a dictionary of the dialect in 2001, and next year a book of grammar. In 2004 he published a collection of texts and he gave some curses of the local Basque in the Valley. The work of the researcher Inaki Camino should be mentioned as well.

== Text ==
Salazarian	Standard Basque (Batua)
I Gauerdi da. Errege Karlomagno Aurizperrin dago bere ejerzito guziarekin: zeruan ez da ageri ez ilargirik eta ez izarrik; urruneala su handi batzurek argitzen die mendien artean. Frankoek kantatzen die herrian, Altabizkarreko inguru senti dira otsoen lotsagarrizko ainuriak, uskaldunek txorrosten ditie arte konetan beren dardo eta aizkurak Ibañetako peina eta harrietan. II; Antsiarekin Karlomagnok ezin ahal izan du loa bildu beregana; ohatze sahetsean bere pajexko batek leitzen du amoriozko kontu bat; urruntxeago, Erroldan azkarrak garbitzen du bere Durandarte ezpata famatua eta Turpin arzobispo onak errezatzen du Jangoikoaren Ama sanduari. III — Ene pajexkoa — erran zakon Errege Karlomagnok; — zer da gauazko isiltasuna hausten duen arroitu kori?—Jauna, — errespondatu zakon pajeak; — Dira Iratiko, itxasoa beino handiagoko, oihanaren hostoak, haizeak mogiturik. — A! gazte maitea, iduri du hiltzearen oihua eta ene bihotza beldur da. IV; Gaua guziz ilun dago. Ez da ageri ez ilargirik eta ez izarrik zeruetan; urruneala su handi batzurek argitzen die mendien artean; frankoak lo daude Aurizperrin; Altabizkarreko inguru otsoak ainuriaz daude eta uskaldunek txorroxten ditie beren dardo eta aizkurak Ibañetako peinetan. V Zer da arroitu kori? — galdegin zuen berriz Karlomagnok, eta pajeak, loak errenditurik, ez zakon kontestatu. — Jauna — erran zuen Erroldan azkarrak; — da mendiko ugaldea, da Andresaroko ardi-saldoen marraka. — Suspiro bat iduri du — erran zuen franko erregeak. — Kala da, Jauna — errespondatu zakon Erroldanek; — Herri konek near egiten du gutaz oritzen denean. VI; Antsiarekin Karlomagnok ezin ahal izan du loa bildu beregana; lurra ta zeruak argirik gabe daude; otsoak ainuriaz daude Altabizkarren; uskaldunen aizkurek eta dardoek argitzen die Ibañetako haritzen artean. VII A! — suspiratzen du Karlomagnok. — Ez doket lorik egin; su batek erretzen nu. Zer da arroitu kori? — Eta Erroldanek, loak errenditurik, ez zakon errespondatu. — Jauna —erran zuen Turpin onak; — erreza ezazu, erreza ezazu enekin. Arroitu kori da Uskal Herriko gerla kantua eta egun da gure gloriaren azken eguna. VIII; Iguzkiak argitzen ditu bizkarrak. Irabazirik Karlomagno ihesi faten da “bere pluma beltz eta bere kapa gorriarekin”. Haurrak eta emazteak dantzatzen dira kontentuz beterik Ibañetan. Kanpokorik ez da ja Uskal Herrian eta menditarren irrintziak igaten dira zeruetaraino.	I Gauerdia da. Karlomagno erregea Aurizberrin dago bere armada guziarekin: zeruan ez da ageri ez ilargirik eta ez izarrik; urrunera su handi batzuk argitzen dute mendien artean. Frankoek kantatzen dute herrian, Altabizkarreko inguruan senti dira otsoen lotsagarrizko ainuriak (marrakak) eta euskaldunek zorrozten dituzte arte honetan (bitartean) beren dardo eta aizkorak Ibañetako haitz eta harrietan. II; Antsiarekin Karlomagnok ezin ahal izan du loa bildu beregana; ohe (ohatze) saihetsean bere pajexko batek leitzen du amodiozko kontu (istorio) bat; urruntxeago, Erroldan indartsuak garbitzen (xahutzen) du bere Durandarte ezpata famatua eta Turpin arzobispo onak errezatzen dio Jaungoikoaren Ama sainduari. III — Ene pajexkoa — erran zion Errege Karlomagnok; — zer da gauazko isiltasuna hausten duen arroitu hori? — Jauna — errespondatu zion pajeak; — Iratiko, itsasoa baino handiagoko, oihanaren hostoak dira, haizeak mugiturik. — A! gazte maitea, irudi du hiltzearen oihua (heiagora) eta ene bihotza beldur (lotsatzen) da. IV; Gaua guziz ilun dago. Ez da ageri ez ilargirik eta ez izarrik zeruetan; urrunera su handi batzuk argitzen dute mendien artean; frankoak lo daude Aurizberrin; Altabizkarreko inguruan otsoak ainuriaz (marrakaz) daude eta euskaldunek zorrozten dituzte beren dardo eta aizkorak Ibañetako haitzetan. V Zer da arroitu hori? — galdegin zuen berriz Karlomagnok, eta pajeak, loak errenditurik (harturik), ez zion errespondatu. — Jauna —erran zuen Erroldan indartsuak; — mendiko ugaldea da, Andresaroko ardi saldoen marraka da. — Suspirio bat irudi du — erran zuen errege frankoak. — Hala da, Jauna — errespondatu zion Erroldanek; — Herri honek negar egiten du gutaz oroitzen (ohartzen) denean. VI; Antsiarekin Karlomagnok ezin ahal izan du loa bildu beregana; lurra ta zeruak argirik gabe daude; otsoak ainuriaz (marrakaz) daude Altabizkarren; euskaldunen aizkorek eta dardoek argitzen dute Ibañetako haritzen artean. VII; A! — suspiratzen du Karlomagnok. — Ez dezaket lorik egin; kalenturak (sukarrak) erretzen (izekitzen) nau. Zer da arroitu hori? — Eta Erroldanek, loak errenditurik (harturik), ez zion errespondatu. — Jauna —erran zuen Turpin onak; — erreza ezazu, erreza ezazu enekin. Arroitu hori Euskal Herriko gerla kantua da eta egun gure gloriaren azken eguna da. VIII; Eguzkiak argitzen ditu mendiak. Irabazirik Karlomagno ihesi joaten da “bere pluma beltz eta bere kapa gorriarekin”. Haurrak eta emazteak dantzatzen dira kontentuz beterik Ibañetan. Kanpokorik ez da ja Euskal Herrian eta menditarren irrintziak zeruetaraino igaten dira.
