= Pierre Lafitte Ithurralde =

French Basque priest and author

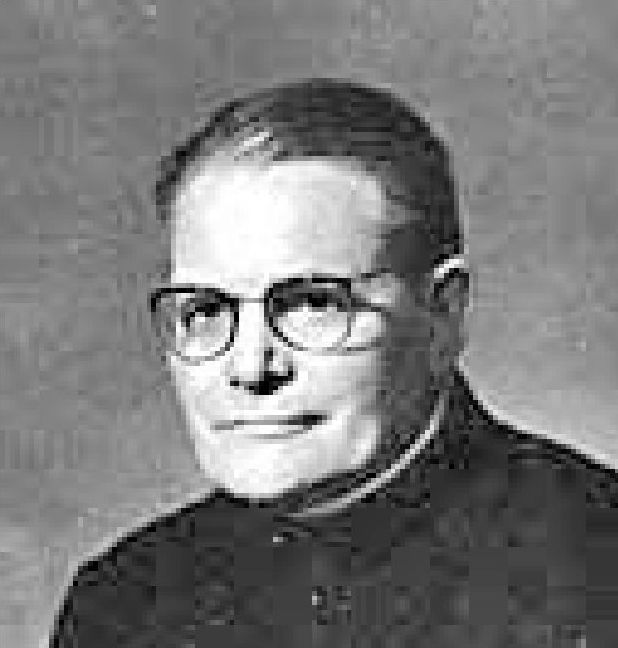
- Born: 21 May 1901; Louhossoa, Labourd, France
- Died: 23 February 1985 (aged 83); Bayonne, Labourd, France
- Occupation: Writer

Pierre Lafitte Ithurralde (21 May 1901 – 23 February 1985), better known as Piarres Lafitte, was a French Basque priest and author.

== Biography ==
Lafitte was born in Louhossoa on 21 May 1901. Orphaned at the age of seven, he was raised by his aunt and uncle in Ithorots, where he also went to the local school. From 1914 he continued his education at the seminary in Urt from where he graduated in 1919. He was ordained on 13 July 1924 and taught at the Catholic University of Toulouse for a number of years until returning to the Northern Basque Country where he eventually settled in Ustaritz for good. He contributed to many Basque and Basque-related publications, including Eskualduna and Gure Herria.

He was deeply involved in the Basque nationalist movement, North and South over many years and founded the first nationalist movement in the North. In 1949 he was called to sit on Euskaltzaindia, the official institution regulating the Basque language.

In 1982 he received an honorary degree from the University of the Basque Country. He died 23 February 1985 in Bayonne (Labourd).

== Works ==
Linguistics

He is known for several seminal works on the Basque language, including:

- Grammaire basque: navarro-labourdin littéraire (1944)
- Grammaire basque pour tous II – Le verbe basque (1981)

Narration

- Historio-misterio edo etherazainaren ipui hautatuak (1990)

Essays

- Koblakarien legea (1935)
- Mende huntako euskaldun idazleen Pentsa-bideak (1974)
- Pierre Topet-Etxahun (1970)

Anthologies

- Eskualdunen Loretegia. XVI-garren mendetik hunateko liburuetatik bildua. Lehen zatia (1645–1800) (1931)

Theater

- Hil biziaren ordenua (1963)
- Santcho Azkarra (1954)

Poetry

- Mañex Etchamendi bertsularia (1972)
- Murtuts eta bertze... (artho churitzeko zonbait ichorio chahar) (1945)

Other works

- Kazetari lan hautatuak (2002)
