= Biscayan dialect =

Dialect of Basque

Biscayan
- Western Dialect
- bizkaiera, euskera
- Native to: Spain
- Region: Biscay, into Álava and Gipuzkoa
- Native speakers: (247,000 (Basque speakers in Biscay, not necessarily Bizkaiera speakers) cited 2001)
- Language family: Basque (language isolate): Biscayan
- Dialects: Western, Eastern, Alavese (extinct)

Language codes
- ISO 639-3: –
- Glottolog: bisc1236 Biscayan aval1237 Alavan
- IETF: eu-biscayan
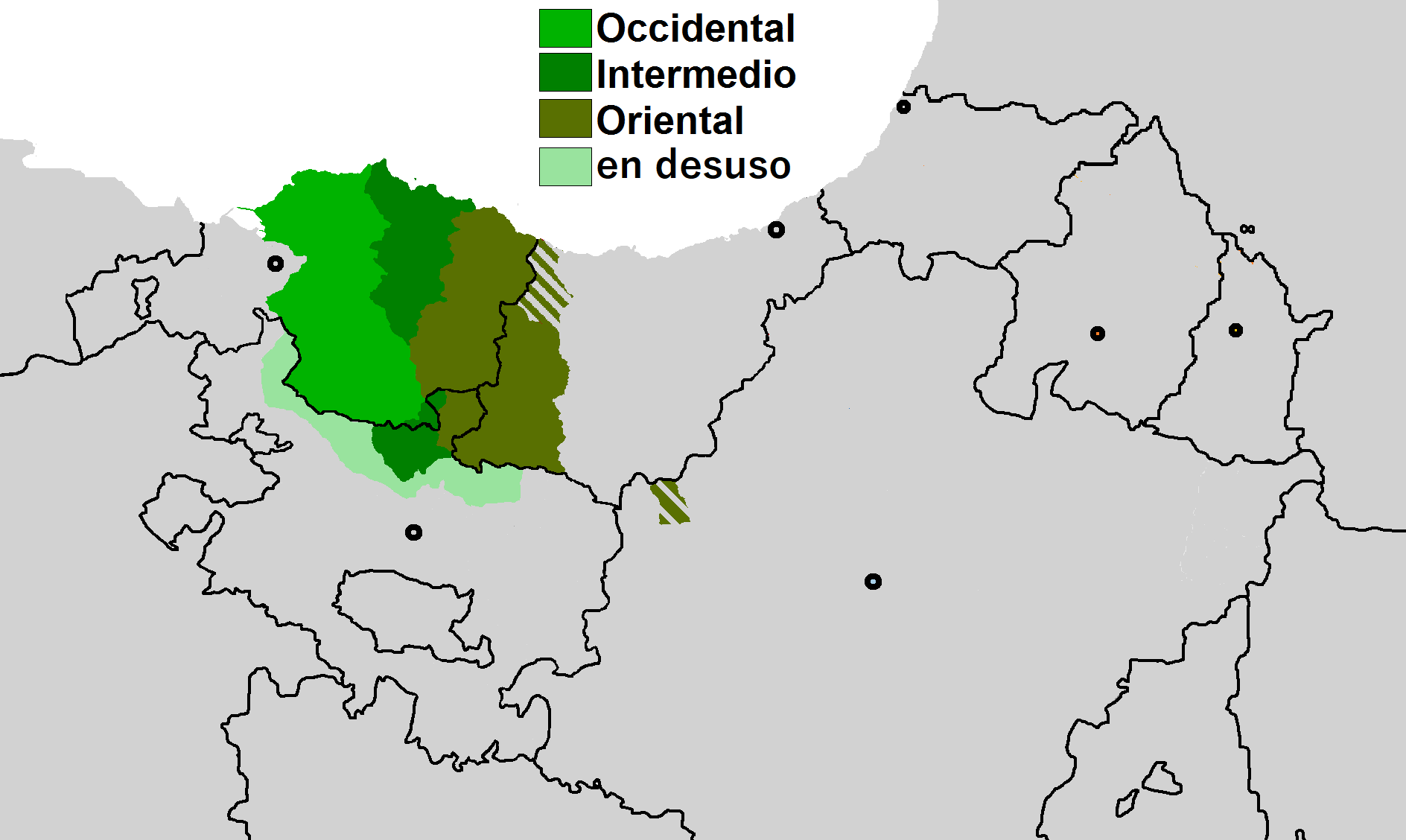

Biscayan, sometimes Bizkaian (Basque: bizkaiera, Spanish: vizcaíno or vizcaino), is a dialect of the Basque language spoken mainly in Biscay, one of the provinces of the Basque Country of Spain.

It is named as Western in the Basque dialects' classification drawn up by linguist Koldo Zuazo, since it is not only spoken in Biscay but also extends slightly into the northern fringes of Alava and deeper in the western part of Gipuzkoa. The dialect's territory bears great similarity to that of the Caristii tribe, as described by Roman authors.

While it is treated as stylish to write in Biscayan and the dialect is still spoken generally in about half of Biscay and some other municipalities, it suffers from the pressure of Spanish.

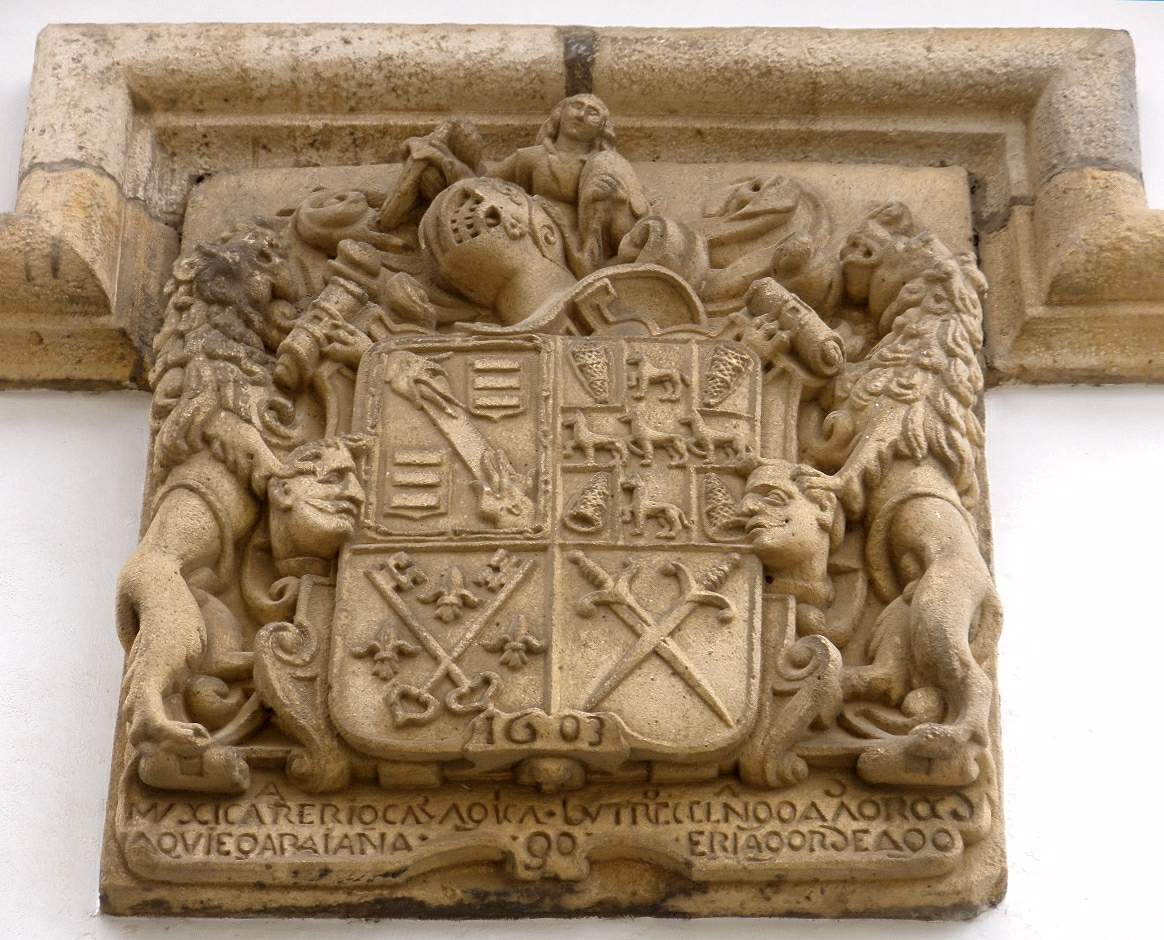
Relief from 1603 in Plentzia old town, with an epigraph in the topolect of the time. Muxica areriocaz agica Butroe celangoa da Oroc daquie garaianago eria gordeago."

Biscayan was used by Sabino Arana and his early Basque nationalist followers as one of the signs of Basqueness.

== Sociolinguistic features ==
In the words of Georges Lacombe, because of the special features of this dialect, Euskera could well be divided into two groups of dialects: Biscayan and the rest. He argued that this dialect was so different from the rest, that the isoglosses separating it from the adjacent dialects (Gipuzkoan or central) are so close to each other that form a clear line; that is, the phonetic-phonological, morphosyntactic and lexical features of Biscayan coincide geographically to the point of creating a distinctively clear and defined dialectical border.

Because of these differences both with the rest of the Basque dialects and also with Standard Basque or Batua, and respecting their corresponding uses, the Euskaltzaindia has produced a Model for Written Biscayan (Basque: Bizkaieraren idatzizko ereduaren finkapenak), a set of rules mainly focused on morphosyntax. The official use of the dialects of Euskera is regulated through Regulation 137 of the Euskaltzaindia, according to which the use of Batua should be limited to the fields of communication, administration and teaching.

Since 1997 and according to the new dialectical classification realized by Koldo Zuazo, author of Euskalkiak. Herriaren lekukoak (Elkar, 2004), the name given to Biscayan is the Western Dialect, due to its use not being limited to the province of Biscay, but with users in some Gipuzkoan regions such as Debagoiena (mainly) and Debabarrena, and also some Alavan municipalities such as Aramaio (Aramayona) and Legutio (Villarreal).

According to a study by Yrizar, this dialect was spoken in the seventies by around 200,000 people, with the number of estimated speakers approaching 300,000 by the eighties. In 1991 16% of the population of this province could speak Basque, and data gathered in 2001 data 22% of the total 1,122,710 Biscayans (i.e. 247,000) could speak and write in Basque. However, this data is only illustrative, as there is no record of how many of the Basque speakers spoke Biscayan specifically and it does not take into account Biscayan speakers in Gipuzkoan territory (Bergara, Leintz Gatzaga, Mondragon, Oñati, etc.)

== Subdialects and variations ==
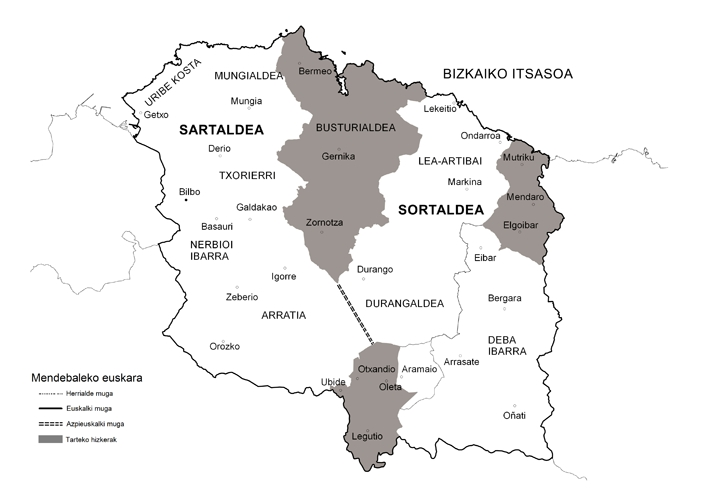
Current map of Biscayan dialects and subdialects.

Biscayan is not a homogeneous dialect, it has two subdialects and eight main variations.

The Biscayan used by Arana and his followers introduced several neologisms and purist forms. They also used a spelling with characters such as ĺ and ŕ, straddling away of the Spanish-influenced tradition. Only some of their innovations had been taken up by modern Biscayan and Standard Basque.

=== Western subdialect ===
- Uribe-Kosta
- Mungialdea
- Txorierri
- Nerbion Valley
- Zeberio
- Arratia
- Orozko

==== Variations ====
- Dialectal variation around the border between the Western and Eastern subdialects. The territory includes: Busturialdea, Otxandio and Villarreal.
- Dialectal variation happens the border between the Western dialect (Biscayan) and the Central dialect (Gipuzkoan). The territory includes: Elgoibar, Deba, Mendaro and Mutriku.

=== Eastern subdialect ===
- Lea-Artibai
- Durangaldea
- Aramaio
- Debagoiena
- Debabarrena
- Ermua
- Eibar
- Soraluze

== Geography and history ==
The borders of Biscayan match those of the pre-Roman tribe of the Caristii. Biscay was formerly included, along with Alava and the Valley of Amezcoa, within the ecclesiastical circumscription of Calahorra, which explains the wide influence of the Western Dialect in these regions.

== Phonology ==
Realizations of the diaphoneme //j//.

Some features of Biscayan as perceived by other dialect speakers may be summed up as follows:

- ⟨j⟩ is realized as [d͡ʒ] or [j].
- The verb root eutsi used for the dative auxiliary verb (nor-nori-nork), e.g. dosku/deusku vs. digu.
- Auxiliary verb forms dot-dok-dozu most of the time, as opposed to general Basque dut.
- Convergence of sibilants: z /s̻/, x /ʃ/ and s /s̺/ > x /ʃ/; tz /ts̻/, tx /tʃ/ and ts /ts̺/ > tz /ts̻/.
- Clusters -itz generally turned into -tx, e.g. gaitza > gatxa.
- The conspicuous absence of past tense 3rd person mark z- at the beginning of auxiliary verbs, e.g. eban vs. zuen.
- Assimilation in vowel clusters at the end of the noun phrase, notably -ea > -ie/i and -oa > -ue/u.
- VñV ending words, as opposed to the Beterri Gipuzkoan VyV or standard Basque V∅V: konstituziño vs konstituziyo, standard Basque konstituzio.
- In spelling, it has no h and it has -iñ- and -ill- where standard Basque has -in- and -il-.

== Vocabulary ==
Biscayan dialect has a very rich lexicon, with vocabulary varying from region to region, and from town to town. For example, while gura ‘to want’ and txarto ‘bad’ are two words widely used in Biscayan, some Biscayan speaker might use cognates of nahi and gaizki respectively, which are generally used in other dialects. One of the current main experts in local vocabulary is Iñaki Gaminde, who in the last years has extensively researched and published on this subject.

- abade: priest (batua (Standard Basque) and other dialects: apaiz).
- agorril: August (batua: abuztu).
- aitite/aittitte/aitxitxe: grandfather (batua: aitona).
- amaitu/ama(i)txu: to finish (batua and other dialects: amaitu or bukatu).
- amama: grandmother (batua: amona).
- amata(t)u: to shut down/turn off (other dialects: itzali).
- artazi(a)k: scissors (batua: guraizeak).
- bagil: June (batua: ekain).
- baltz: black (batua and other dialects: beltz).
- bari(xa)ku: Friday (batua: ostiral).
- baso: hill/mountain (other dialects: baso ‘forest’).
- batzar: meeting (other dialects: biltzar).
- beilegi: yellow (batua and other dialects: hori).
- berba: word (other dialects: hitz or ele).
- berakatz: garlic (other dialects: baratxuri).
- domeka: Sunday (batua and other dialects: igande or jai eguna ‘holiday’).
- ederto: good, well, satisfied, expression showing agreement... literally, ‘beautifully’ (other dialects: ederki).
- edur: snow (batua and other dialects: elur).
- eguazten: Wednesday (batua: asteazken).
- eguen: Thursday (batua: ostegun).
- garagarril: July (batua: uztail).
- gatzatua: curd (other dialects: mamia).
- gitxi: little, not much (batua and other dialects: gutxi).
- gura/gure: to want, to desire (other dialects: nahi).
- izara: sheet (other dialects: maindire).
- izeko: aunt (batua and other dialects: izeba).
- lorail: May (batua: maiatz).
- ilbaltz: January (batua: urtarril).
- ilen: Monday (batua and other dialects: astelehen or astelen).
- indaba: Bean (other dialects: babarrun).
- jaramon: to pay attention (batua and other dialects: arreta, kasu, etc.).
- jezarri: to sit (other dialects: eseri).
- jausi: to fall (other dialects: erori or amildu).
- jorrail: April (batua: apiril).
- kirikino: hedgehog (batua and other dialects: triku or sagarroi).
- karu: expensive (batua and other dialects: garesti).
- korta: stable (batua and other dialects: ukuilu, tegi, abeltegi, barruki, saltai , etc.).
- labandu: to slip (other dialects: labain).
- lantzean behin: sometimes, every now and then (batua and other dialects: noizean behin or noizbehinka).
- lapiko: pot, pan (batua and other dialects: lapiko or eltze).
- lar, larregi: too much (other dialects: gehiegi, aski, sobera).
- le(ge)z: like, such as... (other dialects: bezala).
- lei: ice (batua and other dialects: izotz, jela, horma).
- lepo: back (body part) (batua and other dialects: bizkar; lepo ‘neck’).
- lotu: to stop (batua and other dialects: gelditu).
- madari: pear (batua and other dialects: udare or txermen).
- mailuki: strawberry (batua and other dialects: marrubi).
- mi(i)n: tongue (body part) (batua and other dialects: mihi).
- martitzen: tuesday (batua: astearte).
- mosu: face (batua and other dialects: aurpegi).
- motz: ugly (batua and other dialects: itsusi; motz ‘short’).
- odoloste: black pudding/blood sausage (batua and other dialects: odolki).
- okela: meat (batua: okela or haragi).
- olgeta: game, fun, joke (batua and other dialects: olgeta or jolas).
- oratu: to arrive, to take/grab, to hold (other dialects: heldu).
- ortu: fruit/vegetable garden (batua: ortu or baratz; other dialects: baratz).
- osatu: to heal (batua: osatu or sendatu).
- oste: behind (other dialects: atze).
- ostarku: rainbow (other dialects: ostadar).
- otu: occur/come to mind (other dialects: bururatu).
- papar: breast (batua: bular or papar).
- pernil: ham (batua and other dialects: urdaiazpiko or xingarra).
- sama: neck (other dialects: lepo).
- txarto: bad (batua and other dialects: gaizki or txarto).
- txiker: small (batua and other dialects: txiki or tipi).
- txilio: shout/scream (other dialects: garrasi).
- udagoien: fall/autumn (batua: udazken).
- uger egin: to swim (batua and other dialects: igeri egin).
- urre: near (other dialects: hurbil, gertu).
- urrin: far (other dialects: urrun).
- uzki: anus (other dialects: ipurtzulo or ipurdi).
- zapatu: Saturday (batua: larunbata).
- zarama: trash (other dialects: zabor or zakar).
- zelan: how (other dialects: nola or zer moduz).
- zemendi: November (batua: azaro).
- zezeil: February (batua: otsail).

== Media ==
=== Radio ===
- Bizkaia Irratia: FM 96.7 MHz
- Arrakala Irratia: FM 106.0 (Lekeitio).
- Arrate Irratia: FM 87.7 (Eibar).
- Irratia Arrasate irratia: FM 107.7 (Debagoiena).
- Bilbo Hiria Irratia: FM 96.0 (Bilbao).
- Itsuki Irratia: FM 107.3 (Bermeo).
- Matrallako Irratixa: FM 102.8 (Eibar).
- Radixu Irratia: FM 105.5 (Ondarroa).
- Tas-Tas: FM 95.0 (Bilbao).

=== Newspaper ===
- Goiena: Debagoiena

=== Magazine ===
- Aikor: Txorierri.
- Anboto: Durangaldea.
- Bagabiz Aldizkaria: Gernika.
- Barren: Elgoibar.
- Begitu: Arratia.
- Berton: Bilbao.
- Bizkaie: Txurdinaga, Bilbao.
- Drogetenitturri: Ermua.
- Eta kitto!: Eibar.
- Kalaputxi: Mutriku.
- Pil-pilean: Soraluze.
- Prest!: Deusto, Bilbao.

=== Television ===
- GOITB: Debagoiena.
- Urdaibai Telebista: Gernika.

== See also ==
- Basque dialects
