= Upper Navarrese dialect =

Dialect of Basque

Upper Navarrese
- High Navarrese
- Native to: Spain
- Region: Navarre
- Language family: Basque (language isolate): Upper Navarrese
- Dialects: Aezkoan; Baztanese

Language codes
- ISO 639-3: –
- Glottolog: alto1238 Septentrional Upper Navarrese alto1237 Meridional Upper Navarrese

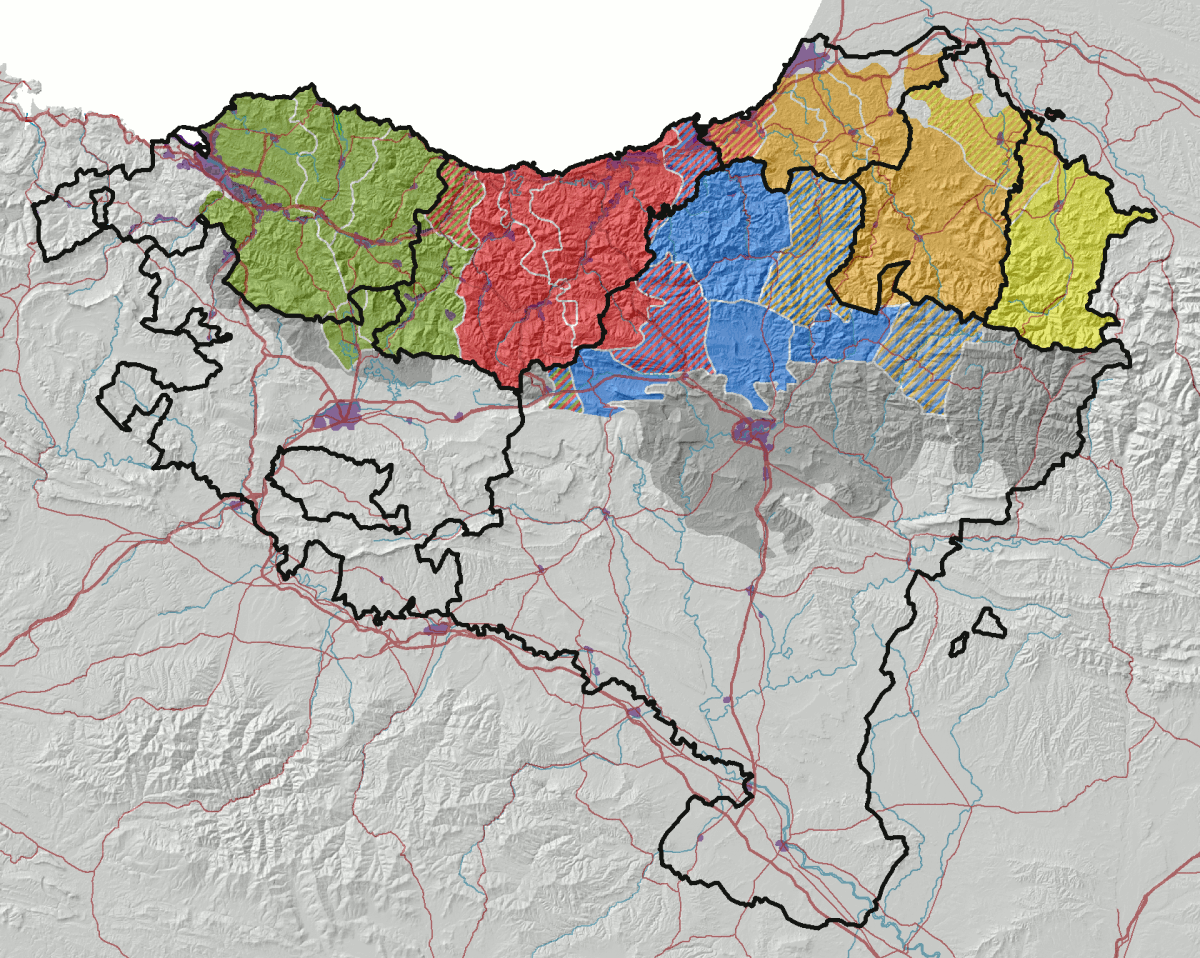
Modern map of Basque dialects. Upper Navarrese is shown in blue.

Upper Navarrese (sometimes called High Navarrese) is a dialect of the Basque language spoken in the Navarre (Basque: Nafarroa or Nafarroa Garaia) community of Spain, as established by linguist Louis Lucien Bonaparte in his famous 1869 map. He actually distinguished two dialects: Meridional (area of Pamplona and south) and Septentrional. However, the southern varieties became extinct early in the 20th century mainly after becoming absorbed by Northern Spanish or Aragonese. So documentation of the Meridional subgroup is rendered impossible. It is unknown whether the extinction was due to Francisco Franco's fierce suppression of Basque culture.

Upper Navarrese and Eastern Navarrese are no closer to each other than they are to Gipuzkoan.

== See also ==
- Basque dialects
