= Souletin dialect =

Dialect of Basque spoken in France

Souletin
- Zuberoan
- Zuberera
- Region: Soule, France
- Native speakers: (8,700 cited 1991)
- Language family: Basque (language isolate): Souletin

Language codes
- ISO 639-3: bsz (deprecated for eus in 2007)
- Glottolog: basq1250
- Souletin

Souletin (Occitan: Soletin) or Zuberoan (Basque: Zuberera) is the Basque dialect spoken in Soule, France. Souletin is marked by influences from Occitan (in particular the Béarnese dialect), especially in the lexicon. Another distinct characteristic is the use of xuka verb forms, a form of address including in third person verbs the interlocutor marker embedded in the auxiliary verb: jin da → jin düxü (s/he came → s/he came to you).

== Name ==
In English sources, the Basque-based term Zuberoan is sometimes encountered. In Standard Basque, the dialect is known as zuberera (the province name Zuberoa and the language-forming suffix -era). Various local forms are üskara, xiberera and xiberotarra. In French, it is known as souletin. In Spanish, the dialect is called souletino or suletino.

== Distribution ==
The southern dialect Roncalese was sometimes included within Zuberoan. A Basque language variety close to Zuberoan may have extended more to the east, into the Central Pyrenees, as attested by placenames and historical records about the Basque peoples (Wascones, qui trans Garonnam et circa Pirineum montem habitant, 'Vascons, who reside beyond [river] Garonne and around the Pyrenees' in the Royal Frankish Annals).

== Phonology ==
=== Consonants ===
Consonant phonemes in Souletin
		Labial	Lamino- dental	Apico- alveolar	Postalv./ Palatal	Velar	Glottal
Nasal		m		n	ɲ		
Plosive	aspirated	pʰ	tʰ			kʰ	
Plosive	voiceless	p	t		c	k	
Plosive	voiced	b	d		ɟ	ɡ	
Affricate			t͡s̻	t͡s̺	t͡ʃ		
Fricative	voiceless	f	s̻	s̺	ʃ		h h̃
Fricative	voiced		z̻	z̺	ʒ		
Lateral				l	ʎ		
Trill				r			

- /ɾ/ present in other dialects has been lost in Souletin.
- /z̻ z̺/ are found almost exclusively in loanwords; they are present in other varieties only as allophones of /s̻ s̺/.
- /ʒ/ corresponds to /x/ in other varieties.
- /h̃/ is found exclusively in intervocalic position, and triggers the nasalization of the adjoining vowels.
- /c ɟ/ are coronal [t̠ʲ d̠ʲ], not dorsal [k̟ʲ g̟ʲ].

=== Vowels ===
Vowel phonemes in Souletin
	Front				Central		Back	
	unrounded		rounded		Central		Back	
	oral	nasal	oral	nasal	oral	nasal	oral	nasal
Close	i	ĩ	y	ỹ			u	ũ
Mid	e	ẽ					o	(õ)
Open					a	ã		

- In addition to the five vowels present in all other Basque dialects, Zuberoan also has a close front rounded vowel /y/, which is markedly noticeable to speakers of other varieties.
- All six vowels can be nasalized, with nasalization being phonemic; /õ/ is absent in some Souletin varieties.
- It is likely that the sixth vowel arose influenced by the Béarnese vowel shift some centuries ago instead of being an ancient vowel lost in other dialects of Basque.

=== Orthography ===
Vowels
Grapheme
a	e	i	o	u, o	ü	a, an	e, en	i, in	o, on	u, un, o, on	ü, ün
Phoneme
a	e	i	o	u	y	ã	ẽ	ĩ	õ	ũ	ỹ

Consonants
Grapheme
b	d	dd	f	g	h	j	k	l	il, ll	m	n	in, ñ	p	r, rr	s	t	it, tt	x	z
Phoneme
b	d	ɟ	f	g	h	ʒ	k, kʰ	l	ʎ	m	n	ɲ	p, pʰ	r	s̺, z̺	t, tʰ	c	ʃ	s̻, z̻

== Example ==
This example of the "Orreaga" ballad composed by Arturo Campion shows some differences between this dialect and the standard Basque (Euskara batua).

Zuberoan (Note: Written around 1880 by Emmanuel Intxauspe.)	Euskara batua (Standard Basque)
I Gaiherdi da. Errege Karloman Auritz-berrin dago bere armadareki; zelü ülhünian ezta ageri, ez argizagi, ez izarrik; hürrünian sügar handi batzük argitzen die mendiartetan; Frantzesak khantatzen ari dira herrian; Altabizkarreko üngürünetan entzüten dira otsoen izigarriko orroak, eta holatan Üskaldünek zorrozten dütie beren eztenak eta aizkorak Ibañetako harri eta harbochietan. II; Khechü eta erreus, Karlomanek eztezake loik har. Ohe saihetsian bereter batek irakurten dü amoriozko khuntü bat; hürrünchiago Arrolan gaitzak argitzen dü bere Dürandal ezpata famatia, eta Türpin archebisko hona ari dá Jinkoaren Ama saintiari othoitzen. III; Bereter maytia, — dio Errege Karlomanek; — zer dá gaiazko isiltarzüna hausten dian herots hori? — Jauna,— ihardesten deio bereterrak; — Iratiko, ichasoa beno zabalago den, oihaneko ostoak dira aiziak erabilten. — Ah! haur maytia, heriotziaren deihadarra üdüri dik, eta ene bihotza lazten dük. IV; Gaia osoki ülhün da. Argizagirik ez izarrik ezta ageri zelietan; hürrünian sügar handi batzük argitzen die mendiartetan; Frantzesak ló daude Auritz-berrin: Altabizkarreko üngürünetan otsoak orroaz ari dira, eta Üskaldünek zorrozten dütie bere eztenak eta aizkorak Ibañetáko harroketan. V Zer dá herots hori? — galdatzen dü berriz Karlomanek, eta bereterrak, loaz egochirik, ezteio ihardesten. — Jauna, — dio Arrolan azkarrak; mendiko ur-turrusta da, Andresaroko artaldiaren marrakak. — Intziri bat üdüri dü, — ihardesten dü Errege Frantzesak. — Egia dá, Jauna, — dio Arrolanek; — herri hunek nigar eglten dü gützaz orhitzen denian. VI; Khechüeriareki Karlomanek ezin dezake loa bil; zelü lürrak argigabe dira; otsoak orrokoz ari dira Altabizkarren; Üskaldünen eztenek eta aizkorek distiatzen die Ibañetako haritzartetan. VII; Ah! — dio hasperenez Karlomanek. — Eztezaket loa bil; suharrak erratzen nai. Zer da herots hori? — Eta Arrolanek, loaz egochirik, ezteio ihardesten. — Jauna, — dio Türpin honak; othoi ezazü, othoi-ezazü eneki. Herots hori Üskaldünen gerla-ahairia dá, eta hau da gure omen handiaren azken egüna. VIII; Ekhiak argitzen dütü mendiak. Garhaiturik ihesi doa Karloman, «bere hegats beltz eta kapa gorriareki». Haurrak eta emaztiak dantzan ari dira boztarioz Ibañetan. Ezta atzerik Uskal-Herrian, eta menditarren oihiak heltzen dirá zelietarano.	I Gauerdia da. Errege Karloman Aurizberrin dago bere armadarekin; zeru ilunean ez da ageri, ez ilargi, ez izarrik; urrunean sugar handi batzuk argitzen dira mendi arteetan; Frantsesak kantatzen ari dira herrian; Altabizkarreko inguruneetan entzuten dira otsoen izugarrizko orroak, eta horrela euskaldunek zorrozten dituzte beren eztenak eta aizkorak Ibañetako harri eta harkaitzetan. II; Kexu eta artega, Karlomanek ez dezake lorik har. Ohe saihetsean bereter batek irakurtzen du amodiozko kontu bat; urrunxeago Arrolan gaitzak argitzen du bere Durandal ezpata famatua, eta Turpin artzapezpiku ona ari zaio Jainkoaren Ama sainduari otoitzen. III; Bereter maitea, — dio Errege Karlomanek; — zer da gaueko isiltasuna hausten duen zalaparta hori? — Jauna,— erantzuten dio bereterrak; — Iratiko, itsasoa baino zabalago den, oihaneko hostoak dira haizeak erabiltzen. — Ah! haur maitea, heriotzaren deiadarra irudi dik, eta ene bihotza lazten duk. IV; Gaua osoki iluna da. Ilargirik ez izarrik ez da ageri zeruetan; urrunean sugar handi batzuk argitzen dira mendiartetan; Frantsesak lo daude Aurizberrin: Altabizkarreko inguruneetan otsoak orroz ari dira, eta Euskaldunek zorrozten dituzte beren eztenak eta aizkorak Ibañetako arroketan. V Zer da zalaparta hori? — galdetzen du berriz Karlomanek, eta bereterrak, loaz egotzirik, ez dio erantzuten. — Jauna, — dio Arrolan indartsuak; mendiko ur-zorrotada da, Andresaroko artaldearen marrakak. — Auhen bat irudi du, — erantzuten du Errege frantsesak. — Egia da, Jauna, — dio Arrolanek; — herri honek negar egiten du gutaz oroitzen denean. VI; Kexuekin Karlomanek ezin dezake loa bil; zeru lurrak argigabe dira; otsoak orroz ari dira Altabizkarren; Euskaldunen eztenak eta aizkorak distiratzen dira Ibañetako haritz arteetan. VII; Ah! — dio hasperenez Karlomanek. — Ez dezaket loa bil; suharrak erretzen nau. Zer da zalaparta hori? — Eta Arrolanek, loaz egotzirik, ez dio erantzuten. — Jauna, — dio Turpin onak; otoitz egin, otoitz egin enekin. Zalaparta hori Euskaldunen gerla-doinua da, eta hau da gure omen handiaren azken eguna. VIII; Eguzkiak argitzen ditu mendiak. Garaiturik ihesi doa Karloman, «bere hegats beltz eta kapa gorriarekin». Haurrak eta emazteak dantzan ari dira boztarioz Ibañetan. Ez da atzerik Euskal Herrian, eta menditarren oihuak heltzen dira zeruetaraino.

== See also ==
- Basque dialects

== Bibliography ==
- Hualde, José Ignacio; Ortiz de Urbina, Jon (2003). A Grammar of Basque. Berlin: Mouton de Gruyter. ISBN 3110176831.
- Coyos, Jean-Baptiste (2002). "Zubereraren idazkeraz: ortografia, fonetika eta fonologia". Lapurdum (in Basque). 7: 201–219. doi:10.4000/lapurdum.1088.
