= Koldo Zuazo =

Basque linguist

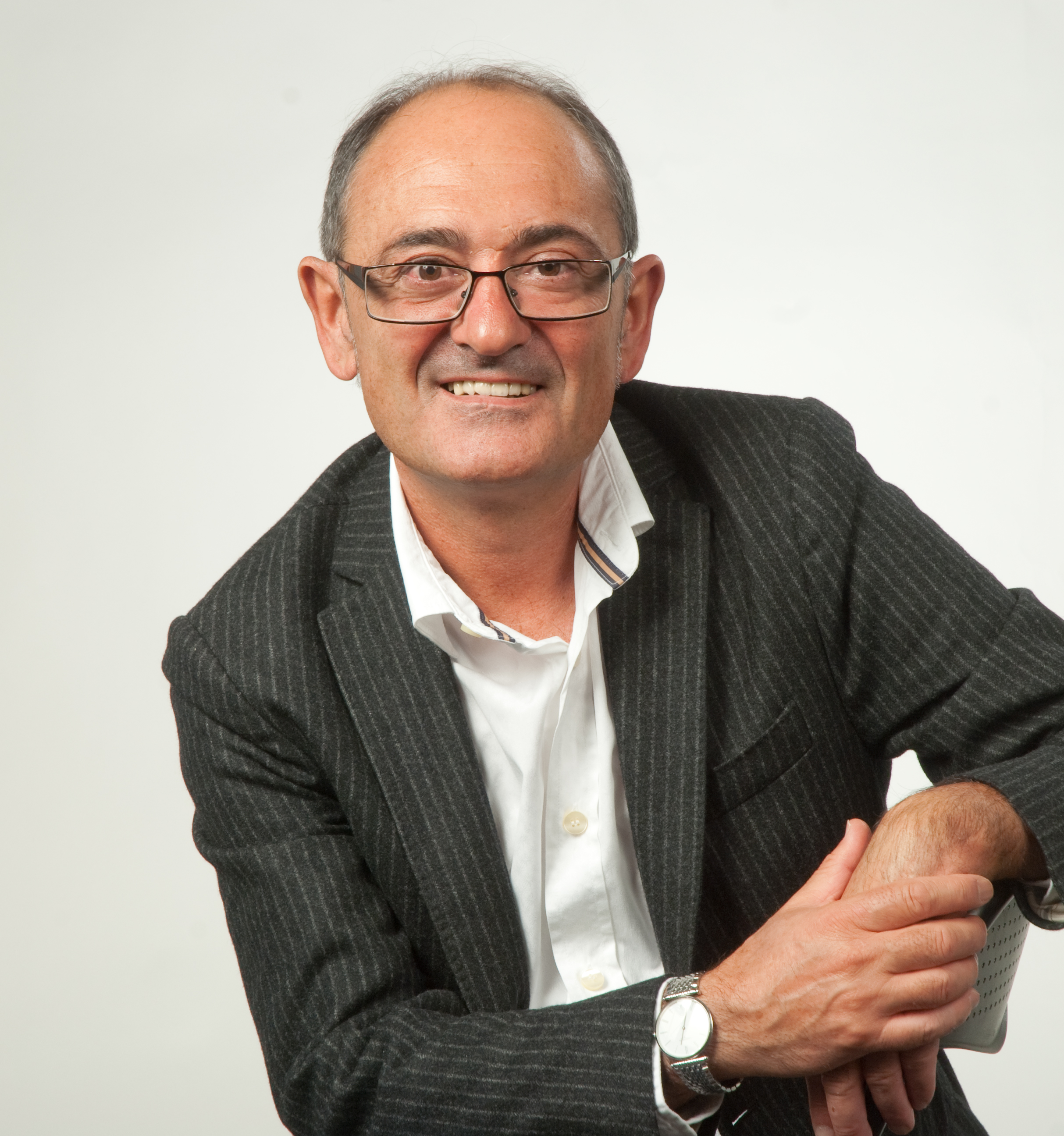
- Zuazo in 2011
- Born: 1956 (age 68–69); Eibar, Gipuzkoa

Koldo Zuazo (born 1956) is a Basque linguist, professor at the University of the Basque Country and specialist in Basque language dialectology and sociolinguistics.

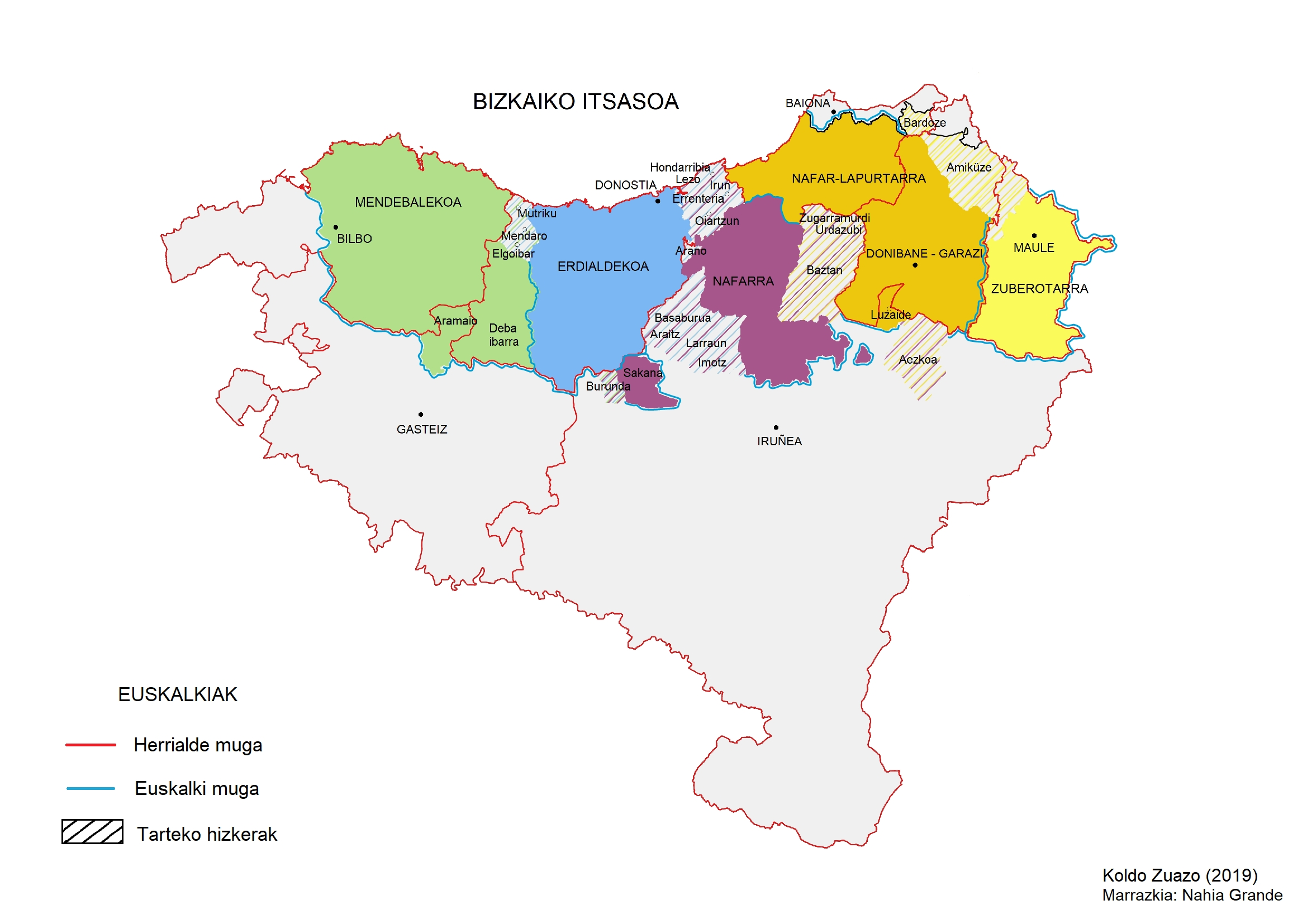
Map of Basque dialects (Zuazo, 2019)

== The dialects of the Basque language ==
Since 1998, Zuazo's work on the Basque dialects has drawn a new classification and a new map of these dialects—this has been a revolution in a field where few changes were made since Louis Lucien Bonaparte's works (1863).

According to Zuazo, the Basque dialects (together with other language innovations) originated in urban areas:

1. Iruña
2. Gasteiz
3. Central Biscay (Durango-Zornotza-Gernika-Bermeo)
4. Beterri in Gipuzkoa (Donostia-Hernani-Andoain-Tolosa)
5. Coastal Lapurdi
6. The source of the Eastern dialect is not clear, Zuazo states that it may have happened in Bearn or in Huesca

Zuazo has observed that all dialects had a similar influence of Latin and therefore he thinks that all dialects originated after Roman times. This is aligned with Mitxelena's earlier thoughts on this subject.

Zuazo thinks that the Western dialect originated in Araba, based on the similarities between the dialects of Biscay, west of Navarre, the Deba valley and Goierri.

== Bibliography ==
=== Non-fiction ===
- Euskararen batasuna (The standardization of Basque language). Euskaltzaindia, 1988 - ISBN 9788485479467
- Euskararen sendabelarrak (Tips and solutions for some of the problems of Basque language). Alberdania, 2000 ISBN 9788495589057
- Euskara batua: ezina ekinez egina (The challenge of the standardization of Basque language). Elkar, 2005 ISBN 9788490275191
- Deba ibarreko euskara. Dialektologia eta tokiko batua (Basque language in the Deba Valley. Dialects and local standards). Badihardugu, 2006 ISBN 9788461138135
- Euskalkiak. Euskararen dialektoak (Description of the dialects of Basque language). Elkar, 2008 ISBN 9788497836265
- Sakanako euskara. Burundako hizkera (Basque language in the region of Burunda). Nafarroako Gobernua eta Euskaltzaindia, 2010 ISBN 9788423532049
- El euskera y sus dialectos (Basque language and its dialects). Alberdania, 2010 ISBN 9788498682021
- Arabako euskara (Basque language in Araba). Elkar, 2012 ISBN 9788415337720
- Mailopeko euskara (Basque language in Mailope). UPV/EHU, 2013 ISBN 9788498608724
- Euskalkiak (The Basque dialects). Elkar, 2014 ISBN 9788490272381
- Uribe Kosta, Txorierri eta Mungialdeko euskara (Basque language in Uribe Kosta, Txorierri and Mungialde). UPV/EHU, 2016 (in collaboration with Urtzi Goitia) ISBN 9788490824122

=== Fiction ===
- Neure buruaren alde (novel). Alberdania, 2011 ISBN 9788498683301

== Other publications ==
- Euskalkiak (website): contains information about the standard Basque language and local standardsand dialects, combining text and media resources. Published in 2015 with the support of the University of the Basque Country. combining text and media resources. Published in 2015 with the support of the University of the Basque Country., . .
