= Standard Basque =

Standard variety of Basque, heavily based on Central Basque

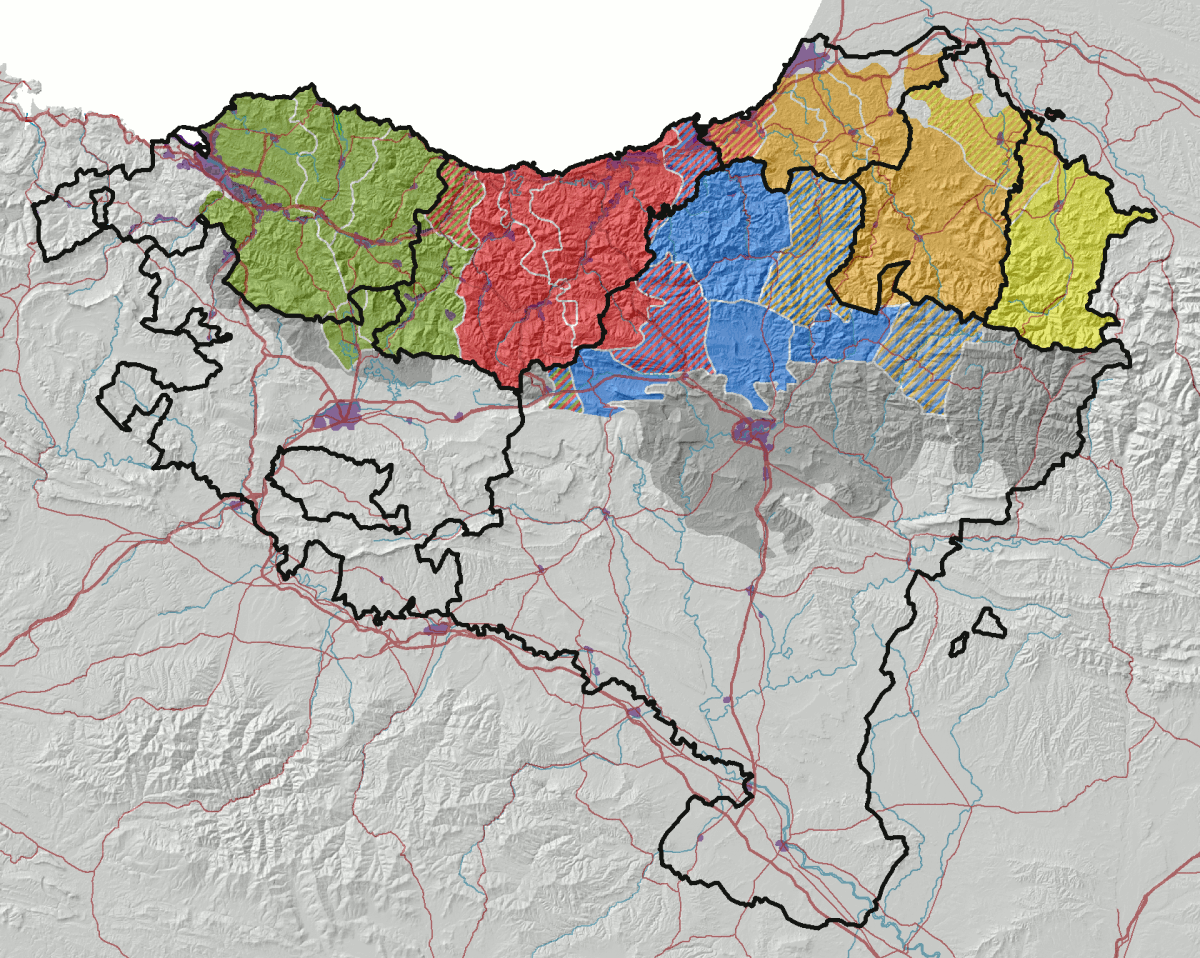
Basque dialects, according to the 21st-century classification by Koldo Zuazo Western (Biscayan) Central (Gipuzkoan) (Upper) Navarrese Navarro-Lapurdian Zuberoan other Basque areas ca 1850 (Bonaparte)

Standard Basque (Basque: euskara batua, lit. 'united Basque') is a standardised version of the Basque language, developed by the Basque Language Academy in the late 1960s, which nowadays is the most widely and commonly spoken Basque-language version throughout the Basque Country. Heavily based on the literary tradition of the central areas (Gipuzkoan and Lapurdian dialects), it is the version of the language that is commonly used in education at all levels, from elementary school to university, on television and radio, and in the vast majority of all written production in Basque.

It is also used in common parlance by new speakers that have not learnt any local dialect, especially in the cities, whereas in the countryside, with more elderly speakers, people remain attached to the natural dialects to a higher degree, especially in informal situations; i.e. Basque traditional dialects are still used in the situations where they always were used (native Basque speakers speaking in informal situations), while batua has conquered new fields for the Basque language: the formal situations (where Basque was seldom used, apart from religion) and a lot of new speakers that otherwise would not have learned Basque.

Euskara batua enjoys official language status in Spain (in the whole Basque Autonomous Community and in the northern sections of Navarre) but remains unrecognised as an official language in France, the only language officially recognised by that country being French.

== History ==
The standard version of Basque was created in the 1970s by the Euskaltzaindia (Royal Academy of the Basque Language), mainly based on the central Basque dialect and on the written tradition. Having been for centuries pressured by acculturation from both Spanish and French, and particularly under the rule of Franco in which the Basque language was prohibited and came closer to extinction in Spain, the Academy felt the need to create a unified dialect of Basque, so that the language had a greater chance of survival.

The 1968 Arantzazu Congress took place in the sanctuary of Arantzazu, a shrine perched in the highlands of Gipuzkoa and a dynamic Basque cultural focus, where the basic guidelines were laid down for achieving that objective in a systematic way (lexicon, morphology, declension and spelling). A further step was taken in 1973 with a proposal to establish a standard conjugation.

The debate arising from this new set of standard language rules (1968–1976) did not prevent Standard Basque from becoming increasingly accepted as the Basque standard language in teaching, the media, and administration (1976–1983), within the context of burgeoning regional government (Statute of Autonomy of the Basque Country, 1979; Improvement of the Charter of Navarre, 1982).

== Reasons for basing on the central dialect ==
Here are the reasons for basing the standardised Basque on the central dialect, the Gipuzkoan, according to Koldo Zuazo:

1. Linguistic: the central dialect is the meeting point of all Basque speakers. The westernmost dialect, Biscayan, is difficult to understand for the speakers from other dialects; and the same occurs with the easternmost dialect, Zuberoan.
2. Demolinguistic: the central area and the western area were in 1968 and still are the zones in which most Basque speakers live. Moreover, it was and is in Gipuzkoa and the surrounding areas that Basque is strongest.
3. Sociolinguistic: since the 18th century, the central dialect, more precisely, the Beterri sub-dialect, is most prestigious.
4. Economic and cultural: Bilbao is certainly the most important Basque city, but it is not Basque speaking. The same is true for Vitoria-Gasteiz, Pamplona, and Bayonne–Anglet–Biarritz. This left Gipuzkoa, the only Basque province with a multipolar structure and no powerful city.

Koldo Zuazo (a scholar and supporter of Basque dialects, especially his own, Biscayan) said that "taking all these characteristics into account, I think that it is fair and sensible having based the euskara batua on the central Basque dialect, and undoubtedly that is the reason of the Batua being so successful". (Note: "Ezaugarri hauek guztiok kontuan izanda, zuzena eta zentzuzkoa begitantzen zait Euskara Batua erdialdeko euskalkian oinarritu izana, eta horren ondorioa da, ezbairik gabe, lortu duen arrakasta.")

== Usage ==
In the 21st century, almost all texts in Basque are published in the standard variety, i.e. administrative texts, education textbooks, media publications, literary texts, etc.

The most widely used ISO 639-2 code is the EU code that always refers to standard Basque. ISO 639-3 code is EUS. The Eu-ES and Eu-FR codes have also been used, but the standard Basque used in Spain and France forms just one language, and most software translators prefer the EU code.

Currently the standard form of the language is widely used in education. In the Basque Autonomous Community and in the north of peninsular Navarre, Standard Basque is the most widely used working language. In the French Basque Country, Basque is used in several ikastolas and in one lyceum, but its use lags far behind French, the only official language of France.

Nowadays all school materials and all the written productions of teachers and students are always written in the standard form of Basque.

Different university studies are currently offered in (standard) Basque at some universities in Spain, France and the USA.

== Advantages of Standard Basque ==
According to Koldo Zuazo, there are six main advantages that euskara batua has brought to the Basque language:

1. Basque-speakers can easily understand each other when they use batua. When they use traditional dialects, difficulties in understand one another increase, especially between speakers of non-central dialects.
2. Before the creation of batua, Basque speakers had to turn to Spanish or French to discuss modern topics or work subjects: Euskara Batua gives them a suitable tool to do so.
3. Batua has made more adult people than ever able to learn the Basque language.
4. The geographic reach of the Basque language has been in retreat for centuries. Old maps reveal that Basque was formerly spoken in a significantly larger area than today. However, now, thanks to the euskaltegis and ikastolas, thanks to primary schools, high schools and universities that teach batua, the Basque-speaking area is expanding anew, as Basque speakers can now be found in any part of the Basque Country, and at times even outside it.
5. Batua has given prestige to Basque because it can now be used in high-level usages of society.
6. Basque speakers are more united: since batua was made, the internal boundaries of the language have also been broken, and the sense of being a community is more alive. With a stronger speakers' community, Basque language becomes stronger.

All of those advantages have been widely recognised and so have been used by Badihardugu, an organisation supporting the traditional dialects.

== Criticism ==
Standard Basque has been described as an "artificial language" by its critics, a "plastified Euskeranto", as it is at times hardly mutually intelligible with the dialects at the extremes (namely the westernmost one or Biscayan, and the easternmost one or Zuberoan). Moreover, Basque purists (such as Oskillaso and Matías Múgica) have argued that its existence and proliferation will kill the historic and genuine Basque languages. Others argue that standard Basque has safeguarded the future of a language that competes with French and Spanish.

Research by the Euskaltzaindia shows that Basque is growing most in the areas where euskara batua has been introduced and taught in preference of local dialects. Indeed, this has permitted a revival in the speaking of Basque, since many of the current elder generations cannot speak the language in part due to the suppression of public use during most of Francisco Franco's dictatorship.

Another point of contention was the spelling of ⟨h⟩. Northeastern dialects pronounce it as an aspiration while the rest do not use it. Standard Basque requires it in writing but allows a silent pronunciation. Opponents complained that some speakers would have to relearn their vocabulary by rote.

Federico Krutwig also promoted the creation of an alternative literary dialect, this time based on the Renaissance Labourdine used by Joanes Leizarraga, the first translator of the Protestant Bible. It also featured an etymological spelling.

The mainstream opinion accepts the batua variant because of the benefits it has brought:

The benefits that the Academy's standard has brought to Basque society are widely recognized. First of all, it made possible for Basque speakers to discuss any topic in their language. Secondly, it has eliminated the (sometimes serious) obstacles that previously existed in communication between speakers from different areas of the Basque Country. At the same time, euskara batua is still nobody's "real" native language, a situation that not uncommonly creates feelings of linguistic insecurity, together with a willingness to accept external norms of linguistic use.

— José Ignacio Hualde and Koldo Zuazo

On the other hand, some Basque authors or translators such as Matías Múgica characterize batua works as a mere pidgin with a severe loss of spontaneity and linguistic quality over the traditional dialects.

== Basque dialects ==
The relation between the Standard Basque and the local dialects is well summarized as follows by William Haddican:

Batua was not primarily intended as a replacement for local dialects, but rather to complement them as a written standard and for inter-dialectal communication. Nevertheless, dialect speakers often view Batua as more objectively "correct" than their own dialect.

— William Haddican

The following dialects were the pre-batua Basque and make up the colloquial or casual register of Basque, the euskara batua being the formal one. They were created in the Middle Ages from a previously quite unified Basque language and diverged from each other since then because of the administrative and political division that happened in the Basque Country.

They are spoken in the Spanish and French Basque regions. Standard Basque was then created using Gipuzkoan as a basis, also bringing scattered elements from the other dialects. They are typically used in the region after which they are named, but have many linguistic similarities.

Spain

- Biscayan
- Gipuzkoan
- Upper Navarrese

France

- Lower Navarrese
- Lapurdian
- Zuberoan

== See also ==
- Egunkaria newspaper, and its successor Berria.
- EITB, Basque television and radio broadcasting corporation
- Ethnologue on languages in Spain
- Languages of the European Union

== Bibliography ==
- Rijk, Rudolf P.G. de (2008), Standard Basque: A Progressive Grammar, Cambridge, Massachusetts: MIT Press
