= Louis Lucien Bonaparte =

French philologist and politician (1813–1891)

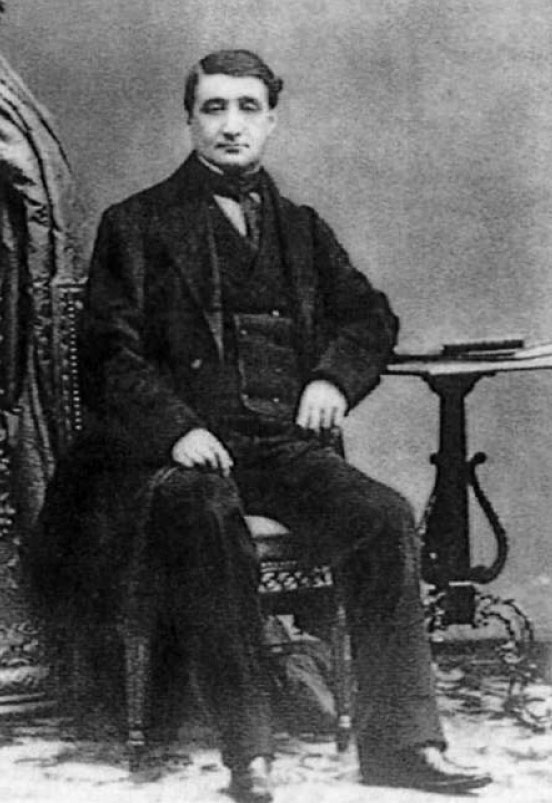
- Born: 4 January 1813; Thorngrove, Grimley, Worcestershire, England
- Died: 3 November 1891 (aged 78); Fano, Italy
- Burial: St. Mary's Roman Catholic Cemetery, Kensal Green
- Spouse: Anna Maria Cecchi; Clémence Richard
- Issue: Louis Clovis Bonaparte
- House: Bonaparte
- Father: Lucien Bonaparte
- Mother: Alexandrine de Bleschamp
- Occupation: Philologist, politician

Louis Lucien Bonaparte (4 January 1813 – 3 November 1891) was a French philologist. The third son of Napoleon's second surviving brother, Lucien Bonaparte, he spent much of his life outside France for political reasons. After a brief political career, he focused on his academic work, which particularly centered on the Basque language and the Celtic languages.

== Early life ==
In 1809, Lucien Bonaparte came under pressure from his brother Napoleon to divorce his wife, Alexandrine de Bleschamp, and return to France from his Italian estates, where he was a virtual prisoner, needing permission to leave his own land. He took ship to sail to the United States, but in 1810, on the way there, he and his wife were captured by the Royal Navy. The British government allowed Lucien and his wife to settle at Ludlow, and later at Thorngrove House, Grimley, Worcestershire, where Louis Lucien Bonaparte was born in 1813. Napoleon believed Lucien had gone to Britain as a traitor.

Following his brother's abdication in April 1814, Louis Lucien's father returned to France and then to Rome, where on 18 August 1814 he was made Prince of Canino, Count of Apollino, and Lord of Nemori by Pope Pius VII. In 1824 he was created Prince of Musignano by Pope Leo XII.

In the Hundred Days after Napoleon's return to France from exile in Elba, Lucien rallied to his brother's cause. Napoleon made him a French prince and included his children in the Imperial Family. However, this was not recognized by the restored Bourbon government after Napoleon's second abdication. In 1815, Lucien was proscribed and deprived of his seat in the Académie Française.

Louis-Lucien Bonaparte grew up in Italy and was educated at the Jesuit college at Urbino, before studying chemistry and mineralogy.

== Career ==
A philologist and briefly a politician, Bonaparte spent most of his early life in Italy. He attended the first Riunione degli Scienziati Italiani, a conference of scholars of natural sciences, at Pisa, and published some early work on scientific subjects in Italy. On 29 June 1840, by his father's death, he inherited various papal titles. His first work on languages, called Specimen lexici comparativi, was published at Florence in 1847.

He did not go to France until 1848, when he served two one-year terms in the National Assembly as representative for Corsica (1848) and for the Seine department (1849). In 1852, he was appointed as a Senator, but not long after moved to London, where he spent most of the rest of his life.

He had a printing press in his home printing 10 volumes in 1857 and five in 1858. Being "a passionate collector of bible translations for philological interest," in 1861 he published a Galician and Asturian translation of the Gospel of Matthew in London. In 1866 he was elected member of the Athenaeum Club and at that time presented the club with 137 of his publications bound in 24 volumes.

He worked on the classification of dialects of the Basque language, and his work is still used. He also worked on Cornish and denounced William Pryce for having plagiarized the research of Edward Lhuyd into Cornish and other Celtic languages. He owned the only surviving copy of Athravaeth Gristnogavl and gave permission to the Cymmrodorion society to publish a facsimile in 1880.

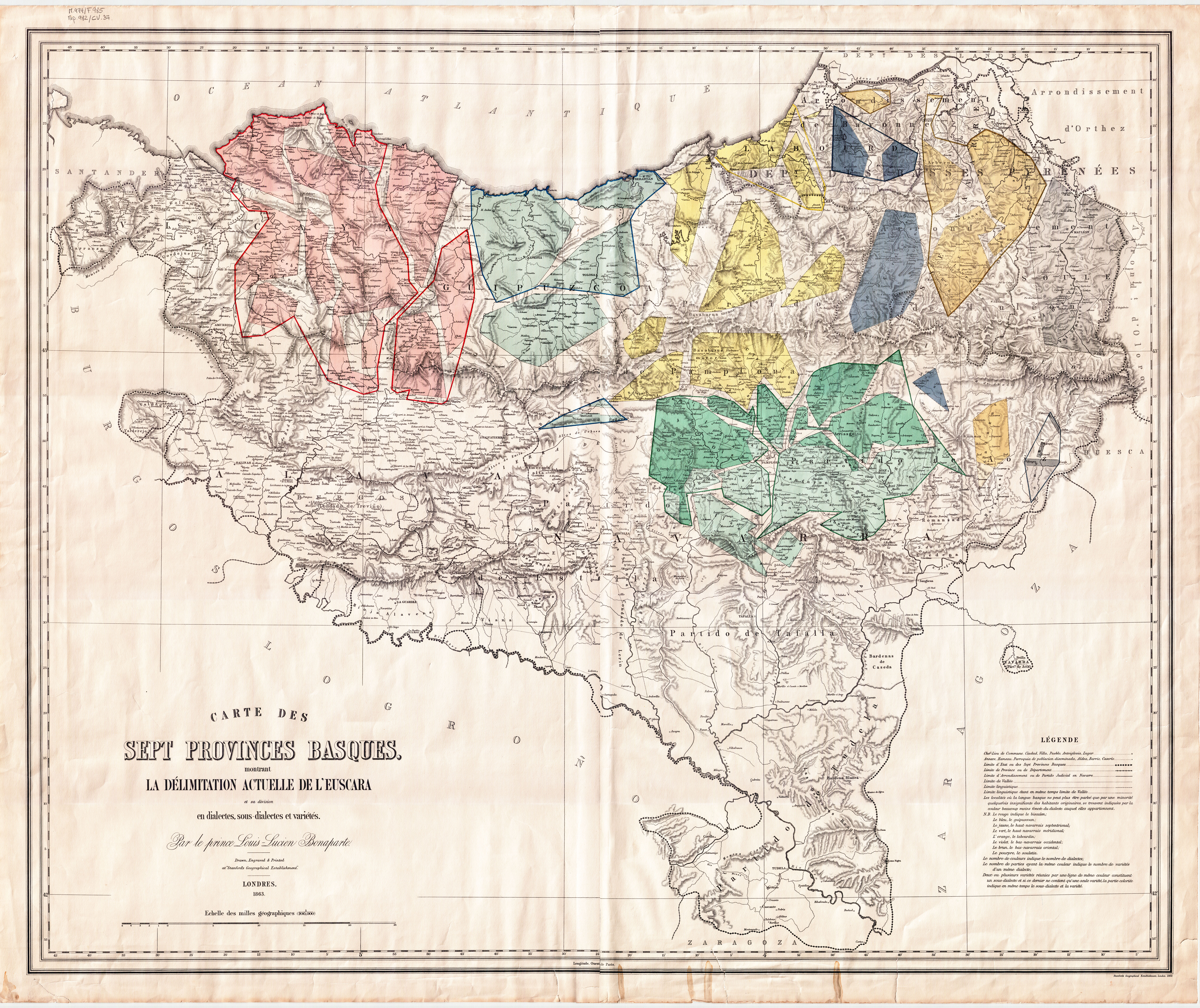
Carte des sept Provinces Basques

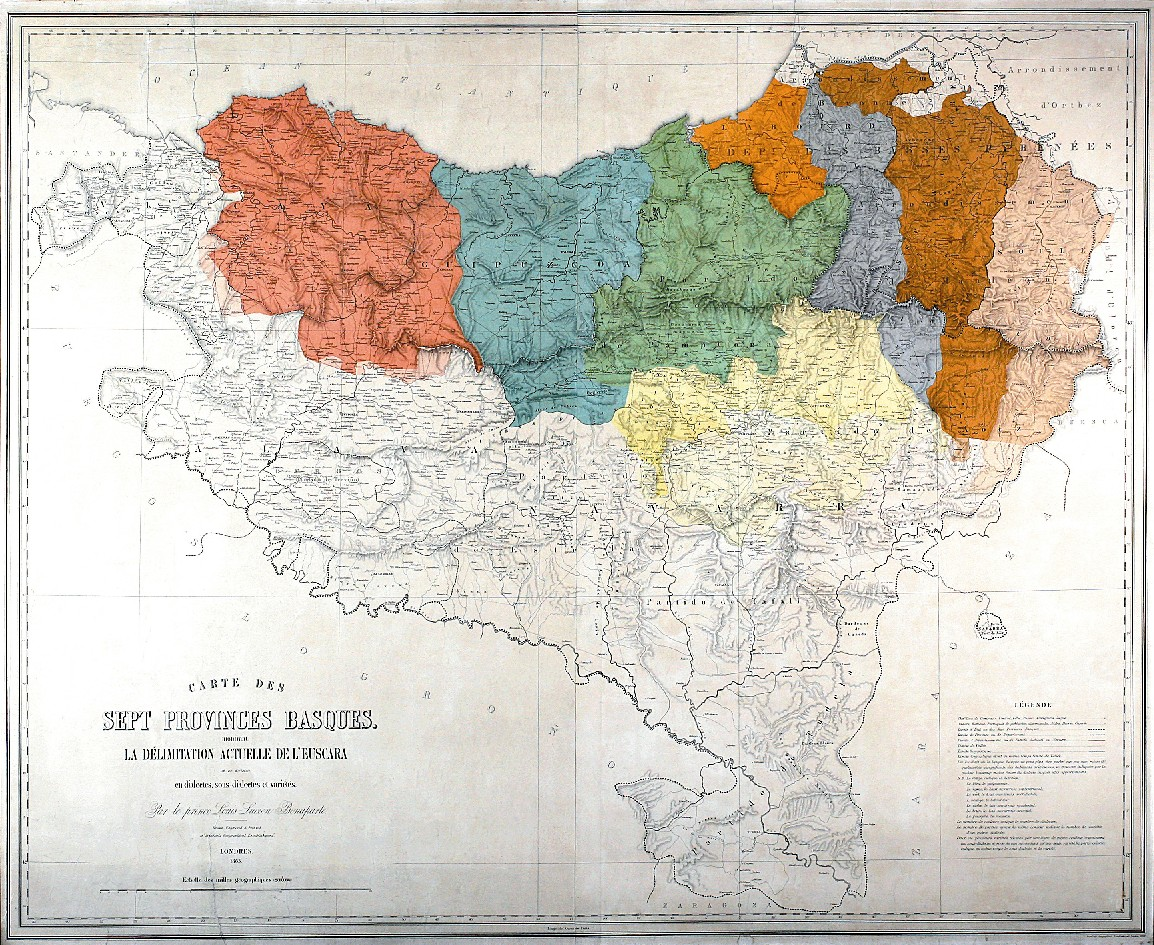
Carte des sept Provinces Basques

== Private life ==
On 4 October 1833, in Florence, Louis Lucien Bonaparte married Maria Anna Cecchi (1813–1891), the daughter of a Florentine sculptor. In 1850, he separated from his wife and later began to live with Clémence Richard, with whom he had a son, Louis Clovis Bonaparte (1859–1894).

In 1891, after Maria Anna's death on 17 March 1891, Louis Lucien and Clémence Richard were married in Kensington.

The Bonapartes' son Louis Clovis became a civil engineer, and on 14 October 1891, at Reigate, he married Laura Elizabeth Scott, the daughter of F. W. Scott of Redhill, another engineer.

Louis Lucien Bonaparte died at Fano, Italy. His widow, Clémence Bonaparte, lived on until 1915. He is buried at St. Mary's Roman Catholic Cemetery, Kensal Green next to his son and second wife. His collection of chemical elements was bequeathed to the Science Museum, London where it subsequently was on display during the UNESCO "International Year of the Periodic Table" in 2019.

His library was bought by the Newberry Library in Chicago.

== General references ==
- Howard Louis Conard, Encyclopedia of the History of Missouri (New York: 1901), Vol. IV, p. 530
- Out of the confusion of tongues: Louis-Lucien Bonaparte (1813–1891), British Library's detailed biography
