= 16th-century Basque literature =

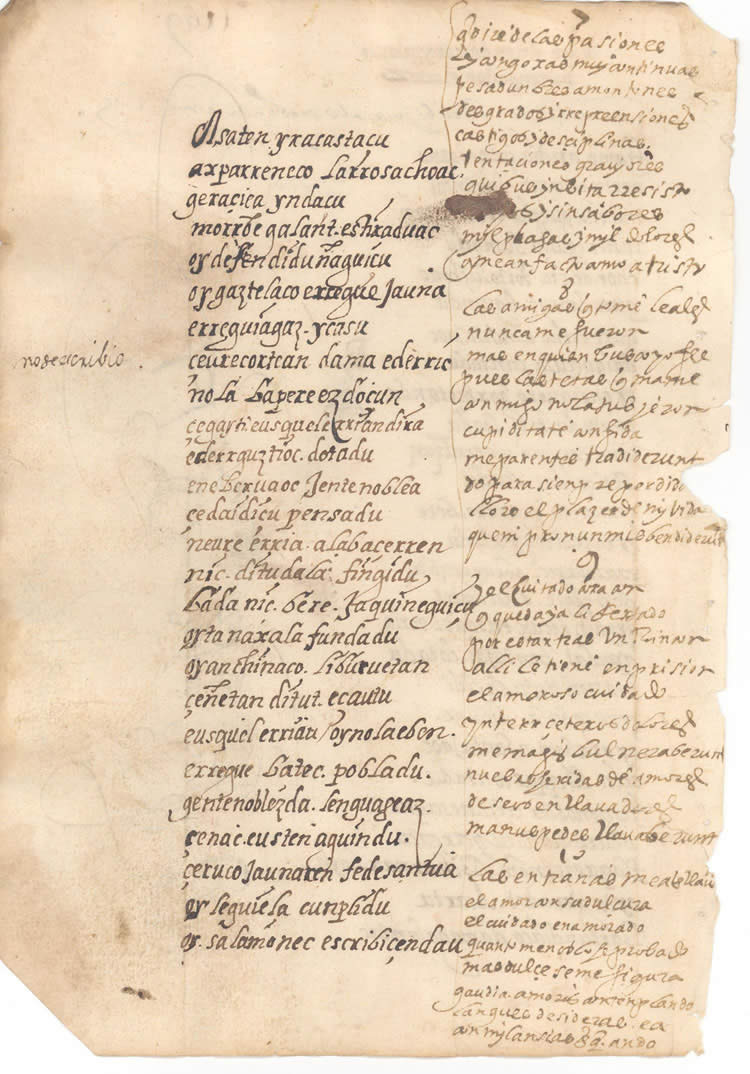
Manuscript of Joan Perez de Lazarraga discovered in the year 2004 by Borja Aginagalde.

16th-century Basque literature begins with three authors considered icons: Joan Perez de Lazarraga, Bernard Etxepare, and Joanes Leizarraga. In the manuscript of the first of them, discovered in 2004, the influence of the traditional court lyric, the Italian novela pastoril and the popular Basque templates can be observed. In the case of Etxepare, often compared to the Archpriest of Hita, the influence of French literature has been mentioned. (Note: "Lur hiztegi entziklopedikoa" Lur, 1991–1994: "...ezin dira ahaztu beste zenbait poeta, François Villon, Clément Marot eta Probentzako juglareak esaterako." Translation: "Nor can we forget the influence of other poets such as François Villon, Clément Marot and the minstrels (sic) of Provence.") Regarding Leizarraga, translator into Basque of the New Testament and other works on religious themes, he stands out for his attempt to find a unified language—a concern of many of the later authors—and for his use of cultured verbal forms and compound sentences, nonexistent in written literature up to that time.

In addition to the works of the aforementioned authors, a translation of the catechism of Jerónimo de Ripalda by Juan Pérez de Betolaza and two verses of an elegy by Juan de Amendux are also preserved. Another translation of a doctrinal text—now lost—is known.

== Historical context ==
In the 16th century, as nowadays, the linguistic domain of the Basque language was fragmented in different areas of sovereignty. The territories of Biscay, Alava and Guipuzcoa had been integrated into the Crown of Castile for centuries, and the Kingdom of Navarre became, from 1512, a viceroyalty, also under the authority of the King of Castile. However, the dynasty previously reigning in Navarre retained its domains of Ultrapuertos, where it would continue to reign until the definitive integration of the kingdom into France. Even in the kingdom of Navarre, Basque had traditionally been neglected in favor of the neo-Latin languages, despite the fact that, especially among the peasantry, but also among the elites, a large part of society was monolingual in Basque.

The main impulse to the literary use of Basque was given by the queen of Navarre Jeanne d'Albret, when, in 1559, she converted to Calvinism and decided to promote the Protestant Reformation. While this was happening in the French Basque Country, in Hegoalde (Spanish Basque Country) the feudal system suffered a severe blow with the appearance of a new legal figure, the universal hidalguia for Vizcaya, Guipúzcoa and some Navarre and Alava valleys, (Note: Specifically in the Province of Guipúzcoa—as also in Vizcaya—the preservation of the universal nobility was of great concern. With this objective in mind, a census of foreigners was carried out in Guipuzcoa in 1528, in which, in addition to Jews, Moors and Turks, French, Castilians, Navarrese, Galicians, Labortians, Irish, Greeks, Venetians and Agotes were also registered. All of them were required to have a title of nobility before proceeding to their settlement.) although clashes between the Ahaide Nagusiak (high nobility families) continued to dominate part of the political life.

== The first text: François Rabelais ==
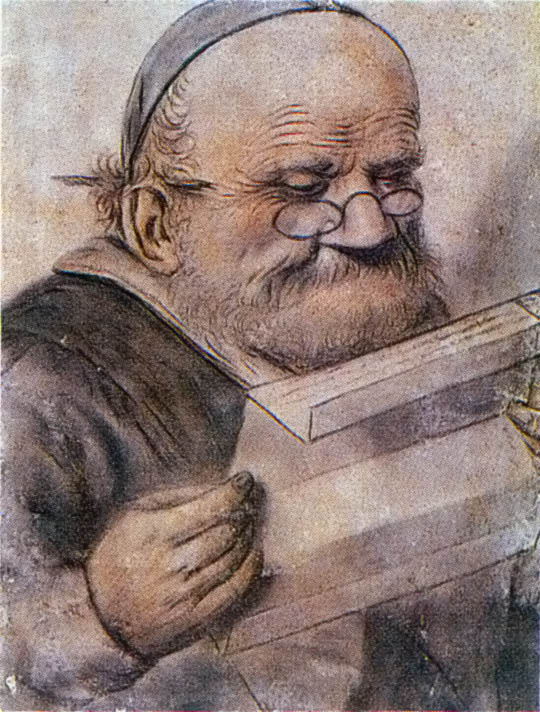
François Rabelais.

The first author to publish in Basque was the physician, priest and famous French writer François Rabelais, in 1542, three years before Etxepare. Rabelais studied at the College of Navarre in Paris, thanks to the protection of the kings of Navarre to that college. In 1534, he published Vie horrifique du grand Gargantua, père de Pantagruel, where he already included a sentence in Basque:

Lagona edatera!
(English: "Friend, let's drink!")

The second edition (1542) of Horribles et épouvantables prouesses du très renommé Pantagruel, roi des Dipsodes represents the appearance of the first complete and printed text in Basque (in chapter IX). According to Vinson, this text is in Souletin dialect or Lower-Navarre. The first part of the text is a sentence and the second part is Panurgo's answer to Pantagruel's question:

Jona andie, guassa goussyetan behar.

And it continues:

Anbates, otoyyes nausu, ey nessassu gourray proposian ordine den. Non yssena bayta fescheria egabe, genherassy badia sadassu noura assia. Aran hondovan gualde eydassu nay dassuna. Esou oussyc eguinan soury hin, et darstura eguy harm, Genicoa plasar vadu.

== Three classic authors ==
=== Bernat Etxepare ===
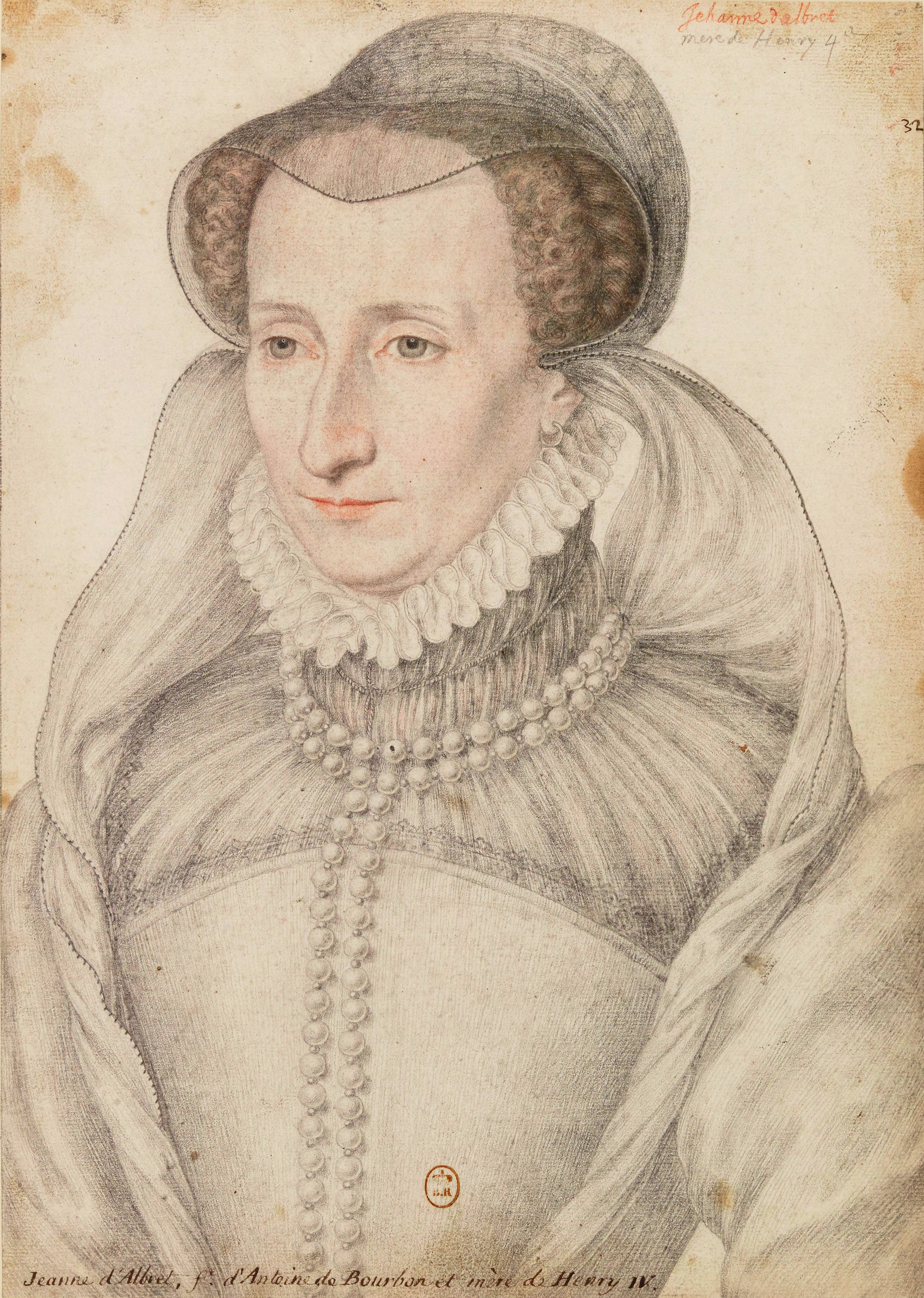
Jeanne d'Albret

The author of the first work in Basque was Bernat Etxepare—or Dechepare, according to the old Basque orthography. Little is known about his life, as was the case with most authors in Basque until the 20th century. According to the 31-line prologue he wrote in his work, he was parish priest of Eyheralar, a town near San Juan Pie de Puerto, in Lower Navarre, present-day France. Born around 1493—although other sources include his birth in the previous decade—he was imprisoned for political reasons, probably for having supported the side of the Beamonteses, supporters of Castilian domination, against the Agramonteses, followers of John III of Albret, king of Navarre, before Charles I of Spain returned the Lower Navarre territories to the house of Foix.

Etxepare was the first author to publish a work entirely written in Basque—something he was probably aware of himself. It was printed in Bordeaux in the year 1545, with the title Linguae Vasconum Primitiae, and it is a short collection of poems about four themes:

- Religion (chapters I and II): the Virgin Mary and Christian doctrine.
- Love (chapters III-IV): lustful and amorous verses.
- Autobiographical poems (chapter XIII): his hard stay in prison and plea of his innocence.
- Praise to the Basque language, to which he predicts a hopeful future (chapters XIV and XV).

Etxepare is innovative in the choice of themes, since there is no record of a similar theme having been used in popular Basque lyric poetry; in this respect, the Navarrese is innovative. In compiling his work, Etxepare employs, according to some authors, techniques typical of bertsolarism (4/4//4/3), (Note: Euskera eta literatura (Batxillergoa), pp. 19–20: "...Etxeparek aukeratutako bide bertsolaritzako bide herrikoiak neurri eta errimetan akatsak zeuzkan (...) Bertsolaritzaren moldeak erabili izanagatik Oihenartek kritika zorrotza egin zion." Translation: "Etxepare's chosen paths of bertsolarism had errors in metrics and rhyme. (...) it is due to the use of meters of bertsolarism that Oihenart harshly criticized his verses.") presumably because he did not know the metrics used in cultured poetry. Other authors, however, do not agree with this opinion. (Note: According to Juaristi, the verses used by Etxepare actually have 16 syllables and not 15, since one more syllable must be added due to their acute ending. According to this, the meter used by Etxepare would be the acute hexadecasyllable (Juaristi (1987, p. 35)). Juaristi also understands that we cannot properly speak of bertsolarism in such an early period. (Juaristi (1987, p. 24)).) He is considered a popular poet because of his use of meters typical of bertsolarism, (Note: Speech by Patxi Altuna. Euskaltzaindia, 1995: "Hori erakusten digute Azkuek Zaraitzun eta aita Donostiak Otxagabian herriaren ahotik jaso zituzten zenbait bertsok, herriak buruz mendeetan zehar gordeak, gure poetaren beste zenbait bertsorekin antz handia dutenak, edota, hobeto esan, hauek haiekin, eta poetak seguruenik harengandik ikasiak.") probably intended to be read or sung.

The theme of love is treated with innocence, but with freshness, according to Julio Urkixo, so it has been said that it is halfway between the Cantigas, by Alfonso X, and the Libro de buen amor, by Archpriest of Hita. It is far from the idealistic courtly lyric of the European Middle Ages; it treats the subject of love relationships with total naturalness, without any trace of Platonism.

For a time this author's work was criticized for the following reasons:

- The freshness and naturalness with which he treats love themes became unacceptable after the Council of Trent.
- The meters, measures and popular rhymes chosen by Etxepare had errors for the new Renaissance poetry, errors that Oihenart would criticize harshly.

Unlike Leizarraga, this author was not concerned with seeking a unified Basque, since his aim was to make Basque known, not that all Basques understood it. Because of this, he wrote in the only dialect he knew, Eastern Lower Navarrese. In general, Etxepare's orthography is quite irregular, given that, as his book was the first published in Basque, he lacked written models.

Bernat's work cannot be understood as that of a solitary author; it was the result of a context, since, as Oihenart wrote in 1665 in L'art poétique basque, at that time there were two other poets, the writer of pastorals Joan Etxegarai and Arnaut Logras, of whose works nothing has come down to us, since it is probable that they were published after Etxepare—which would explain the lack of references to these authors and that he says in his verses: "If until now you were unprinted, from today you will circulate all over the world.", or that they were not published, as happened with Lazarraga's manuscript.

One of the compositions of Etxepare's work, Contrapas, is an authentic hymn to the Basque language, to which a brilliant future was predicted by Koldo Izaguirre.

=== Joan Perez de Lazarraga ===
The manuscript found by Borja Aginagalde in 2004 and acquired by the Diputación de Guipúzcoa from an antiquarian in Madrid, has meant that many of the ideas conceived until now about the history of Basque literature need to be revised, among them the isolation to which literature in Basque was said to have been subjected until well into the Modern Era.

Little is known about the Lord of the Tower of Larrea, belonging to the influential lineage of Lazarraga, coming from Oñate, where he had settled at the end of the 15th century. He and his brother probably studied at the recently created University of Oñate. His brother, after becoming a widower, would later move to Toledo and then to the court of Madrid. Pruden Gartzia defends that Lazarraga could have had contact with Garibay due not only to the proximity, but also to the taste of both for history and chronicles, which the author would capture in the Genealogy of his family, by which he was known until the discovery of the manuscript.

The manuscript is composed of 102 pages in total, of which two-thirds are poetry and the rest is part of a growing genre that had many followers at the time, the novela pastoril from the renaissance. This genre had been inaugurated by Jacopo Sannazaro with La Arcadia and continued by authors such as Jorge de Montemayor, Miguel de Cervantes and many others, including Joan Perez Lazarraga. As in Sannazaro's, in Lazarraga's work prose and verse are intermingled. Far from petrarchism, he is closer to the traditional lyric songs of the 15th century. More elegant than Bernard Etxepare but without meeting the exactitude that Oihenart would ask for in the 17th century, he uses known forms of Basque verse.

If there is anything noteworthy, it is the use of prose, which was believed not to have been developed until the advent of the didactic asceticism of the School of Sara, in the 17th century. It is also valuable as a testimony of the existence of the disappeared Alavic dialect, which had already been proposed by Koldo Mitxelena in his study of Landucci's dictionary. The Basque used by Lazarraga is undoubtedly an archaic Basque, marked by forms in subjunctive already lost, the archaic nondik (ablative) and the old forms in the auxiliary verbs.

=== Joanes Leizarraga ===
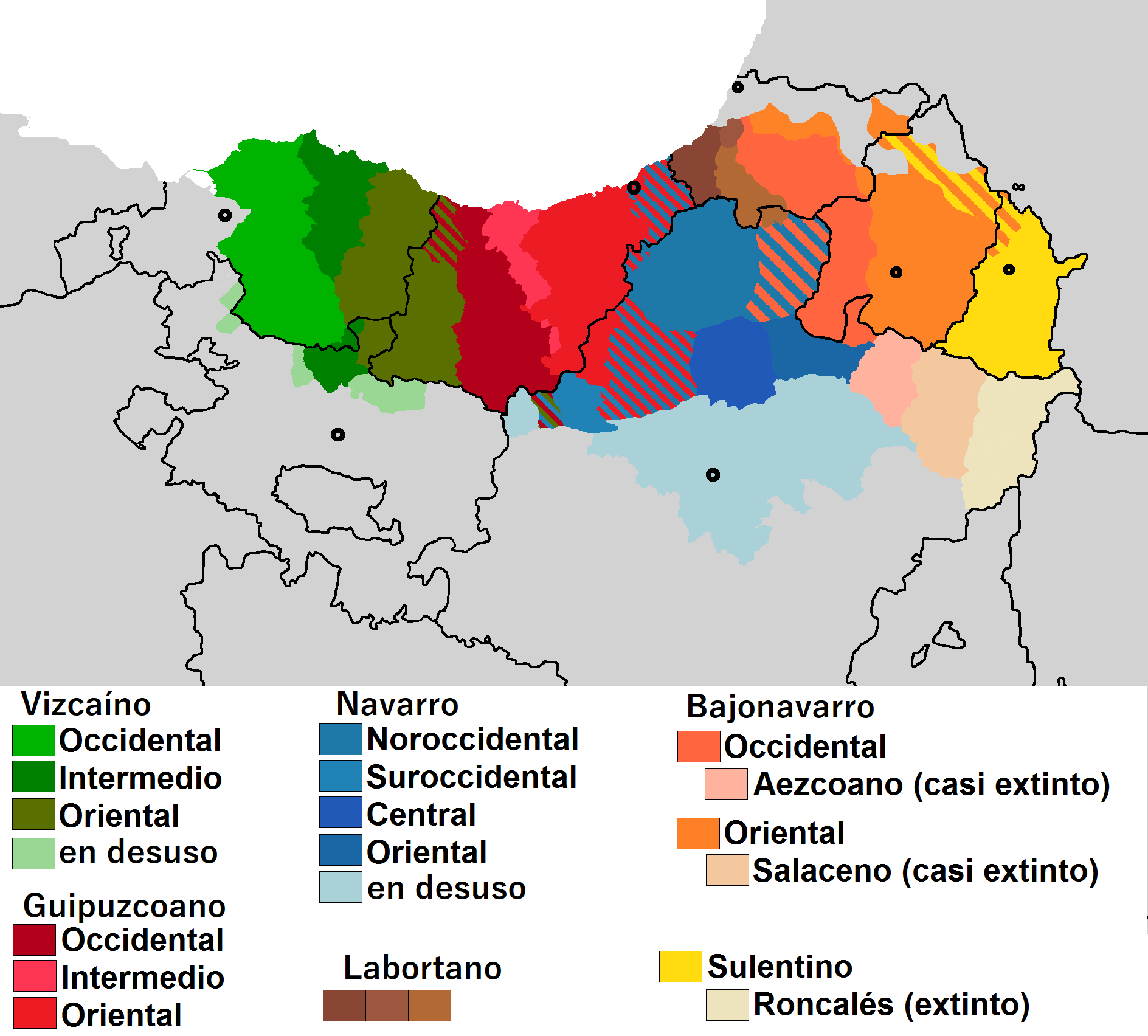
Basque dialects by region.

Dialectal distribution according to the doctoral thesis of Koldo Zuazo

Joanes Leizarraga is relevant for his translations of religious texts. He was born in 1525 in Beraskoitze (Labourd) and died in 1601 in Labastide-Clairence. In 1560 he converted to Protestantism—as did the queen—and placed himself at the orders of the Synod of Pau, which commissioned him to help spread the reformation by translating the New Testament into Basque. Leizarraga published three translations:

- Jesus Krist Gure Jaunaren Testamentu Berria (The New Testament).
- Kalendrera, (calendar of religious festivities).
- ABC edo Kristinoen instrukzionea, (on Christian teachings or doctrine).

The three works were published in 1571 in La Rochelle, the stronghold of the Huguenots. Critics highlight his merits as a translator, since, without having a model for writing prose in Basque, he had to do an immense work of translation. Influenced by Latin, he used a syntax similar to that of Romance languages, with abundant subordinate sentences, although he masterfully alternated short and long propositions.

The recipients of his translations were the Basque speakers of the French Basque Country, (Note: Euskera eta literatura. Elkar: "Iparraldeko euskaldunentzat idatzi zuela igartzen zaio, bestalde.") although it is also unclear which dialect he used, as he took from Labortano, lower Navarrese and Souletin dialects. It is considered that he decided to unite the three dialects to reach a wider audience. Or, perhaps, that he himself spoke this mixture of different dialects. In this regard, the following theories have been put forward:

- Piarres Lafitte sticks to what the author himself says in the prologue, namely that he used his native Basque, i.e. Lapurdi Labortano.
- According to Louis Lucien Bonaparte, the three dialects of the French Basque Country were once united, and Leizarraga would have written when this was still the case. This theory has a serious obstacle: barely a century later, different texts written in Labortano, Low Navarrese and Souletin are found.
- Mathieu René Lafon states that at that time many Lower Navarrese and Souletins traveled to the village of Leizarraga, Beraskoiz. Moreover, the writer's parents and grandparents were from Lower Navarre and the assistants assigned to him by the Queen of Navarre were Souletins. This would explain why all three forms are present in his texts.

On the other hand, it must be taken into account that the coast of Labort at that time was of great economic importance at the European level and, although it was not integrated within the Kingdom of Navarre, Leizarraga used the verbal inflection of this region as a basis.

Because of the cultured use of language that such a translation demanded and the meticulous fidelity he demanded of himself, Leizarraga used numerous cultismos to the detriment of Basque heritage words. For example, he translated "fisher of men" into giza pescadore, instead of the traditional arrantzale. Although innovative in the use of cultured lexicon, his Basque is somewhat archaic in terms of morphology and phonetics. As in Lazarraga's work, linguistic traces can be found prior to the 16th century.

== A Forgotten Translation: Doctrina christiana in romanca and basquence ==
The translation made by the Alava-born Juan Pérez de Betolaza is the first Christian doctrine published in Basque and the first testimony we have of the Western dialect—or Biscayan dialect—despite the clear influence of the Alavese dialect. Its interest is mainly linguistic, since except for an extensive prayer in verse, the rest of the work is a translation of the princeps edition of catechism by Jerónimo de Ripalda. Commissioned by the cardinal of Calahorra, Pedro Manso Zuñiga, it was republished several times after the author's death in 1600, and thanks to this copies are preserved.

Koldo Mitxelena recovered this translation due to its great linguistic interest, since the author was born in Álava and the work was published in the then Lordship of Biscay. Thanks to the manuscript of Lazarraga we know that the dialect spoken in Alava had not yet receded nor had it been absorbed by the Biscayan dialect, so probably the one spoken both in La Rioja and in Betolaza must have been that one. On the other hand, this doctrine was published for the Basque provinces and in Bilbao, and the Alavese dialect is similar in many grammatical and syntactic features to the current Biscayan—due to the fact that this one absorbed in later centuries the one spoken in Alava.

== Missing works ==
=== The Catechism of Sancho Eltso (1561) ===
This book, now lost, was written in 1561 with the title Doctrina cristiana y pasto espiritual del alma para los que tienen cargo de almas y para todos estados en castellano y vascuence (English: Christian doctrine and spiritual pasture of the soul for those with a heavy soul and for all states in Castilian and Basque). Its author was Sancho Eltso, and it is the first catechism printed in Basque, and the first book in Basque published in Hispanic Vasconia that is known. It was printed in Estella in 1568 by the Flemish printer Adriano Anvers, according to the Pamplona historian Isasti. In 1570, the author denounced the Tudela muleteer Juan Bastida for having failed to deliver to the priest of Cintruénigo 444 copies of the catechism. It is thanks to this litigation that we have knowledge of the first catechism in Basque of which no copy has been left to us, as that Flemish printer went to Pamplona in 1568, with all reference to it disappearing from then on.

=== Other lost works ===
- The songbooks of Juan de Undiano
- Joan Etxegarai and Arnaut Logras

== See also ==
- Basque literature
- Bertsolaritza
- Culture of the Basque Country

== Bibliography ==
- Juaristi, Jon (1987). Literatura vasca. Madrid: Taurus. ISBN 84-306-2529-1.
