= Culture of the Basque Country =

The Basque Country is a cross-border cultural region that has a distinctive culture including its own language, customs, festivals, and music.

The Basques living in the territory are primarily represented by the symbol of the flag Ikurriña, as well as the Lauburu cross and the Zazpiak Bat coat of arms. The Gernikako Arbola and the Agur Jaunak are its most recognizable anthems in music, and the oak its most revered tree (cf. the aforementioned Tree of Gernika).

Despite their present conspicuous secularization, the Basques have been Catholics for centuries. However, they owe much of their religious festivals to ancestral beliefs and pagan sites, sometimes extending as late as the 15th century. Saint Miguel, Saint Mary, Saint John and Saint Peter are its most worshiped and ancient cults, while during the Modern period new saints came into being, notably Saint Ignatius of Loyola and Saint Francis Xavier.

== Language ==
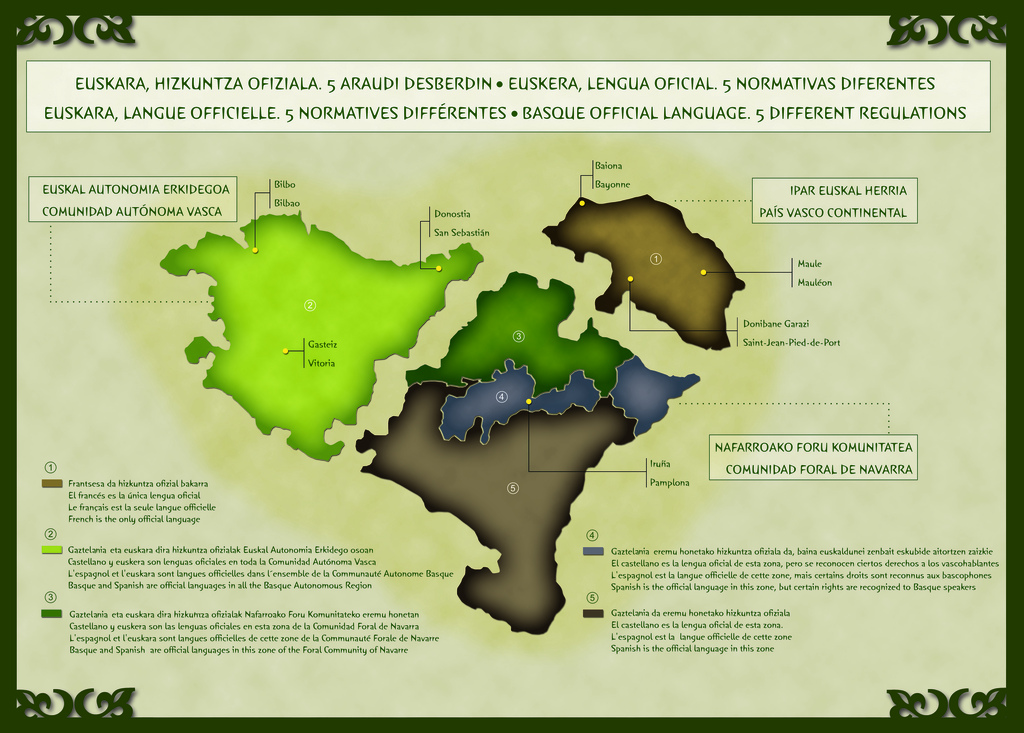
Legal status of Basque (21st century)

The traditional Basque districts are home to Basque, an ergative language. However, Basque has showed a receding trend, and it is nowadays a minority language due mainly to political fragmentation, with higher usage intensity in Biscay, Gipuzkoa, northern-western Navarre, and western sub-Pyrenean areas of the Pyrénées Atlantiques. Spanish and French remain the most widely used everyday communication languages in their respective administrative districts, with the legal status of Basque varying depending on the area.

Basque medium education is provided for by the Ikastola Federation, and sometimes the public network. It is the main linguistic option in the Basque Autonomous Community, while in some areas of the French Basque Country and Navarre its presence is small. Town councils operating in Basque clustered around the consortium UEMA for mutual support and legal assistance.

== Literature ==
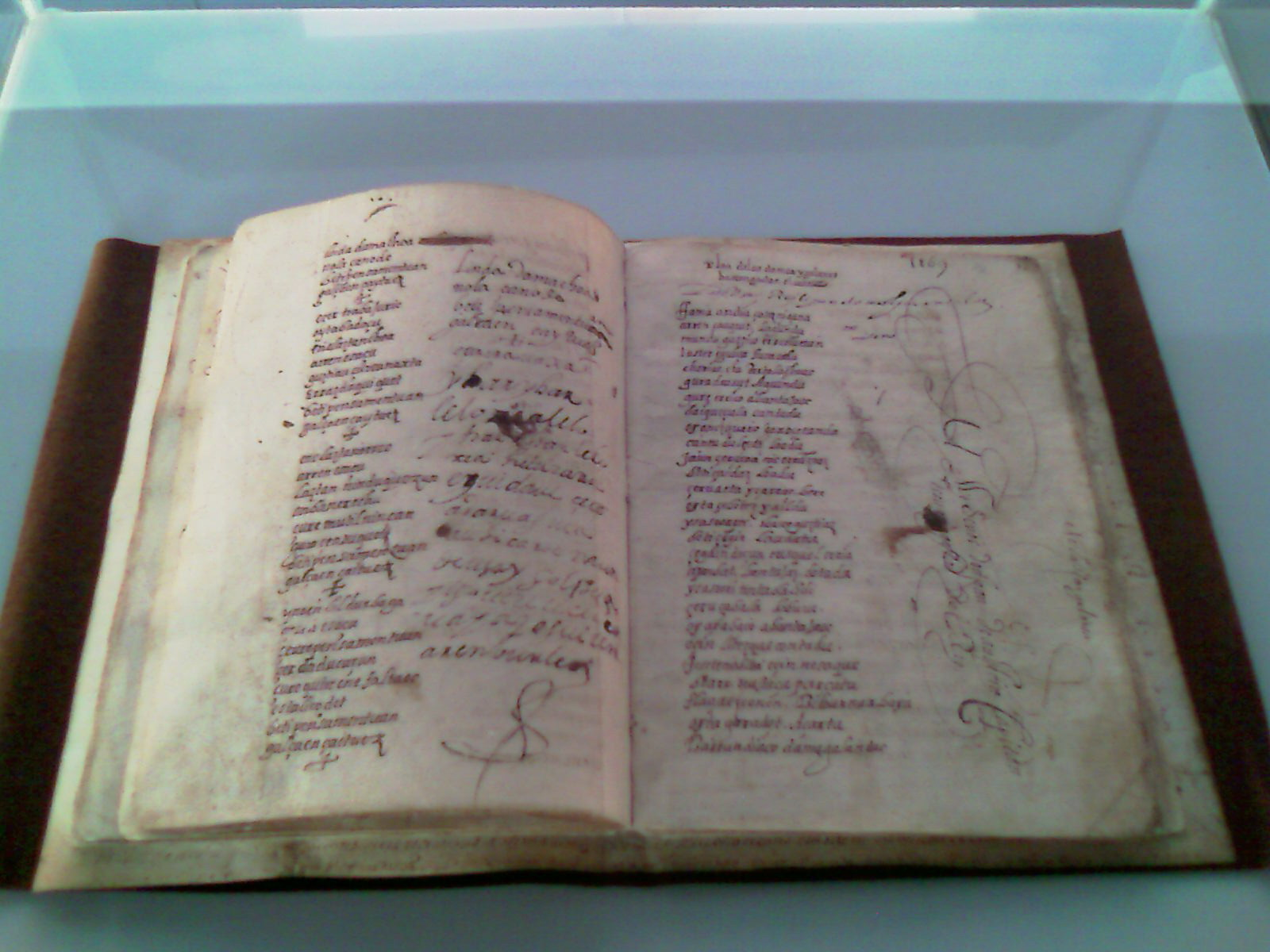
Lazarraga's pastoral novel and set of poems (1567-1602)

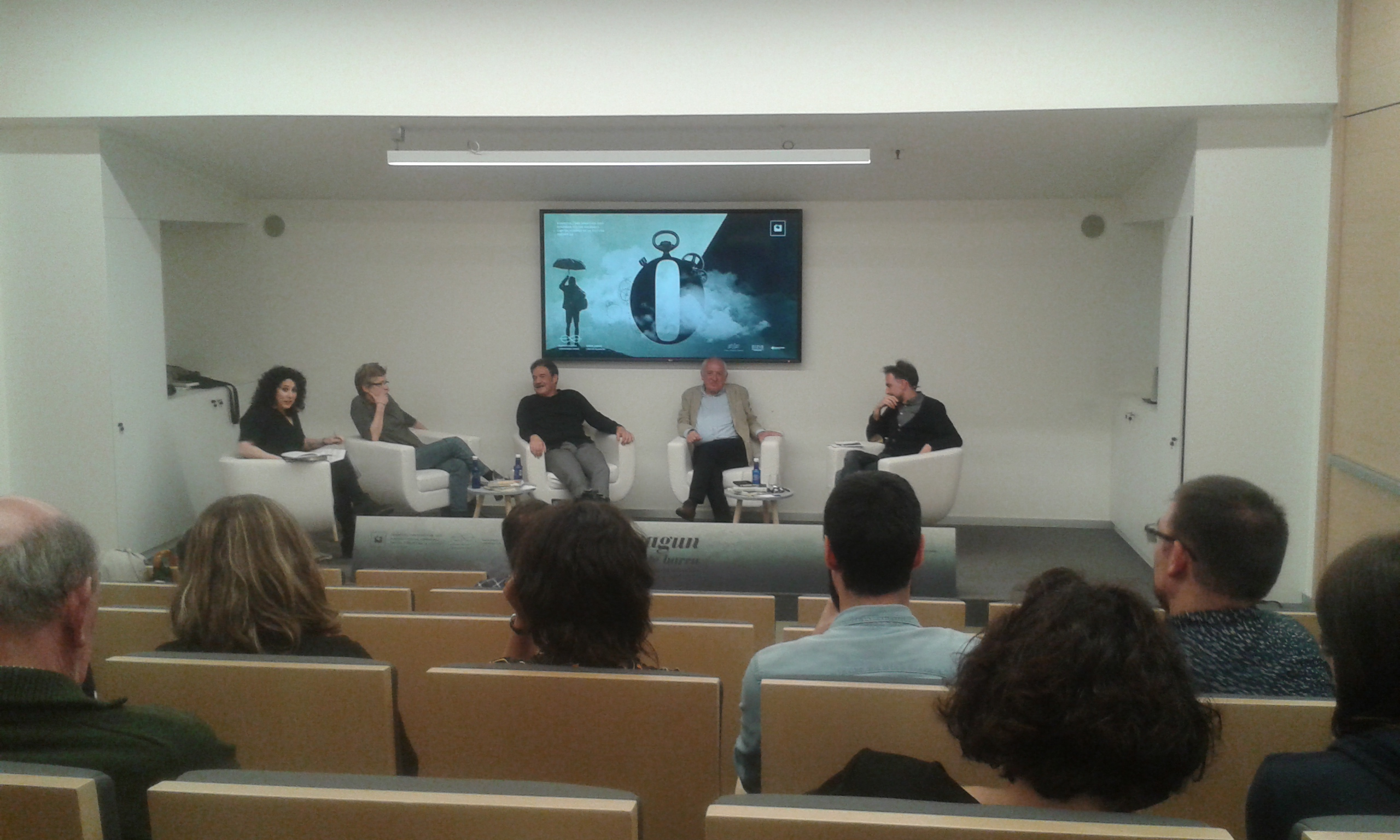
Debate on translation and Basque literature (2017)

Literature in the Basque Country may refer to the literature made in Basque, Spanish, and French. Basque, historically the primary language of the territory at either side of current French-Spanish border, was not prone to be written until the early Modern Period, aside some short poems (Beotibarko gudua), letters (between Navarrese high-ranking officials in the early 15th century), loose phrases, and notations. Stories and poems were transmitted down generations by oral tradition. The official Spanish and French languages were preferred (often compulsory) for written works starting in the 16th century. However, the coming of the printer allowed for the first glossy Basque literary sprouts to spring up (Bernard Etxepare with Linguae vasconum primitiae, 1545; Joanes Leizarraga) in the mid-16th century.

The Royal Basque Society fostered arts and literature in the late 18th century. Much of Basque literature was costumbrismo literature (Garoa by Txomin Agirre, 1912), or Romantic historic novels like Amaya o los vascos en el siglo VIII by Navarro Villoslada (1879) and, especially in Basque, often aimed at Catholic indoctrination up to the Second Republic period, but plays, lyric poems in bertso metre (Bilintx, Joan Batista Elizanburu, the Lore Jokoak festivals), and press articles were also produced. Meanwhile, Spanish language writers started to stand out in the context of the 1898 crisis, figures such as Unamuno and Pio Baroja (El árbol de la ciencia, 1911), hailing from urban areas like Bilbao and San Sebastián.

After the barren postwar years, a new generation set an innovative trend along the lines of contemporary European literature, authors like Txillardegi (influenced by existentialism), Ramon Saizarbitoria, Gabriel Aresti in Basque, or works in Spanish like Tiempo de silencio, as well as Ignacio Aldecoa and Blas de Otero (Pido la paz y la palabra, 1955 (1975)) with their social realism. A committed literature approach appeared unavoidable in the social and political context of Franco's dictatorship. However, the trend towards diversification in genres and styles was confirmed during the 80s and 90s with the emergence of regional editorial houses, and authors as diverse as Joseba Sarrionandia (Ni ez naiz hemengoa, 1985), Bernardo Atxaga (Obabakoak, 1988), Pako Aristi, Aingeru Epalza (in Basque), or Toti Martinez de Lezea, Miguel Sanchez Ostiz and Espido Freire in Spanish. In the 90s and on into the 2000s, Marie Darrieussecq from Bayonne should be highlighted in French language literature.

== Music ==
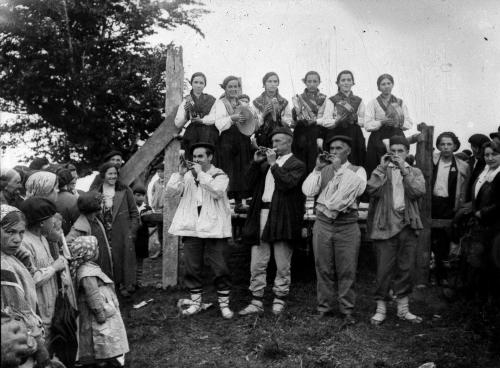
Alboka players of Zeanuri (Biscay)

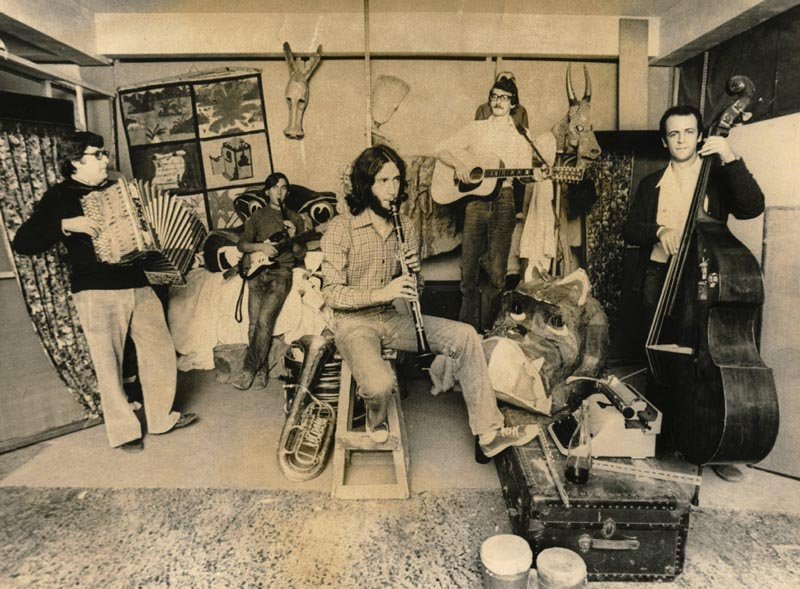
Folk band Oskorri (1977)

Music in the Basque Country has evolved from its historic characteristic instruments (txistu, xirula, trikitixa, etc.) and singing traditions to include a whole range of musical options in step with a modern European context. Popular tunes have been closely related to the bertso tradition, but the tunes used are often variations of a common European folk music heritage. The coming of the Enlightenment and the Royal Basque Society saw attempts of establishing an upper status music, e.g. bringing more dignity to the txistu, and technically developing it.

This trend toward a more sophisticated music catering to the upper classes saw its heyday in the early 20th century, with acclaimed composers like Jesus Guridi or Jose Maria Usandizaga (who held friendship ties with the French Basque Maurice Ravel), featuring Basque topic zarzuelas, operas, and operettas. In the run-up to the golden age of the opera theatres (Victoria Eugenia, Teatro Gayarre, Teatro Arriaga), among individual singers, Julián Gayarre from Roncal struck a chord in the opera scene. Local choirs and ochotes also developed. This is a period of strong influence of the costumbrismo and overall nationalist motifs.

In the early 1960s, the seeds of the Basque music revival were sown at either side of the French-Spanish border with new young figures eager to sing their ideals (Mixel Labeguerie, Benito Lertxundi, etc.), incorporating the guitar as musical instrument. Radio and television (ever more local) provided the springboard for numerous groups, and in the early 80s punk music saw a surge in the Southern Basque Country, crystallizing in a strong musical movement (Basque Radical Rock). Basque traditional music has come to integrate new influences and technical innovations (Tapia eta Leturia, Kepa Junkera, etc.), while many pop-rock bands have confirmed their own paths and even go international, groups as diverse as Gatibu, Barricada, Berri Txarrak, Fito y los Fitipaldis, or La Oreja de Van Gogh.

The proliferation of community centres (kultur etxeak) and private music venues have set the foundations of a vibrant music scene, complementing the existing squat circuit catering to emerging bands. In the late 90s, music festivals sprang up all over the Basque territory, events like Bilbao BBK Live (Bilbao), Euskal Herria Zuzenean (Arrosa, 40 km SE from Bayonne), Azkena Rock Festival (Vitoria-Gasteiz), as well as other smaller ones. Catering to the classical music tastes, the Quincena Musical stands out in San Sebastián, while jazz and folk find their best showcases in Getxo (International Folk and Jazz Festivals), Vitoria-Gasteiz (International Jazz Festival), and San Sebastián (Heineken Jazzaldia).

== Architecture ==
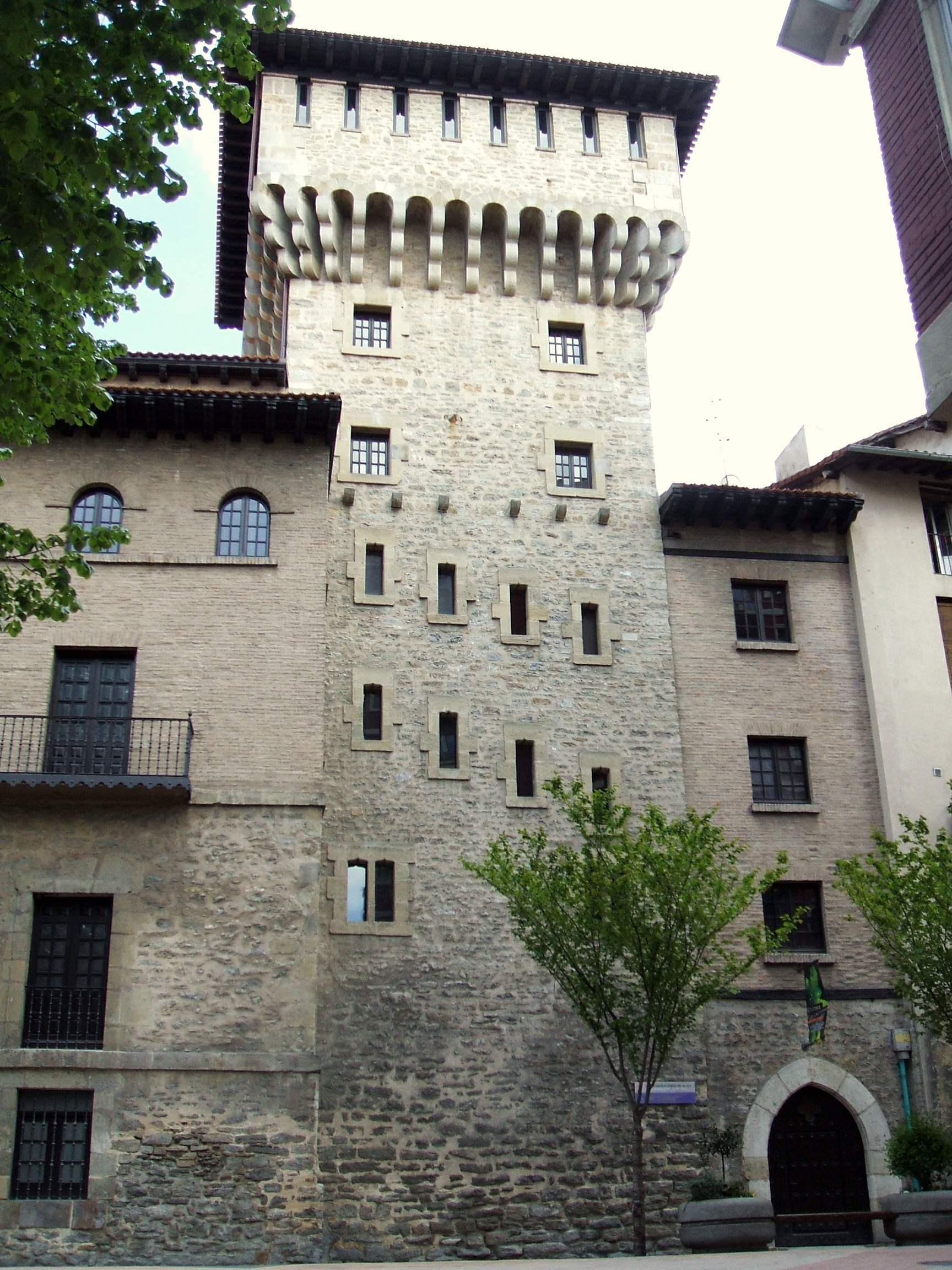
Doña Otxanda Tower (Vitoria-Gasteiz)

The concept of the house holds a special significance for the Basques, rendered as the generic etxea, one that according to tradition was indivisible and to be inherited by the eldest child. The house in the forest is the baserri or farmstead, ubiquitous across the Atlantic basin, but almost absent in the central areas of Álava and Navarre, where traditionally the prevailing type of settlement is the village dotting those areas. The southern fringes of the Basque Country follow a pattern of more scattered and larger settlements (towns). Initially the farmsteads were built all in timber, but as of the 15th century the ground floor started to be framed in stone, limiting timber for the upper floors. The slope of the roofs is not very steep except in the Pyrenean valleys (Aezkoa, Zaraitzu, Roncal, Soule), where the construction of the roofs are more vertical in order to better cope with snowfall.

In the late 19th century, new European styles left an imprint in the traditional Basque house. A blend of Art Deco and the traditional house coined a new style, especially in the French Basque Country, the neo-Basque style, best represented in the Villa Arnaga of Cambo-les-Bains (Kanbo), home to the writer Edmond Rostand. The European architectural trends expanded to the main Basque cities along with their new urban schemes, e.g. Art Deco, Romantic, Modernist, Rationalist.

The Ways of Saint James provided the channel for the penetration of civilian and especially religious architecture starting in the 12th century. The Romanesque and Gothic styles thrived in the period up to the 15th century, with its most outstanding samples found in central and southern Álava and Navarre.

== Religion ==
Traditionally Basques have been mostly Catholics. In the 19th century and well into the 20th, Basques as a group remained notably devout and churchgoing. In recent years church attendance has fallen off, as in most of Western Europe. The region has been a source of missionaries like Francis Xavier and Michel Garicoïts. Ignatius Loyola, founder of the Society of Jesus, was a Basque. California Franciscan Fermín Lasuén was born in Vitoria. Lasuén was the successor to Franciscan Padre Junípero Serra and founded 9 of the 21 extant California Missions along the coast.

In 2018, less than 1% of the population from Basque Autonomous Community carries out religious or civil participation and collaboration activities in organizations. In 2019, the proportion of Basques that identify themselves as Roman Catholic was 60%, while 24.6% were non-religious and 12.3% of Basques were atheist.

== Folklore ==
Ancient Basque mythology did not, for the most part, persist after the arrival of Christianity and is mostly known through the analysis of legends, toponyms and historical references to pagan rituals of the Basque.

== Sport ==
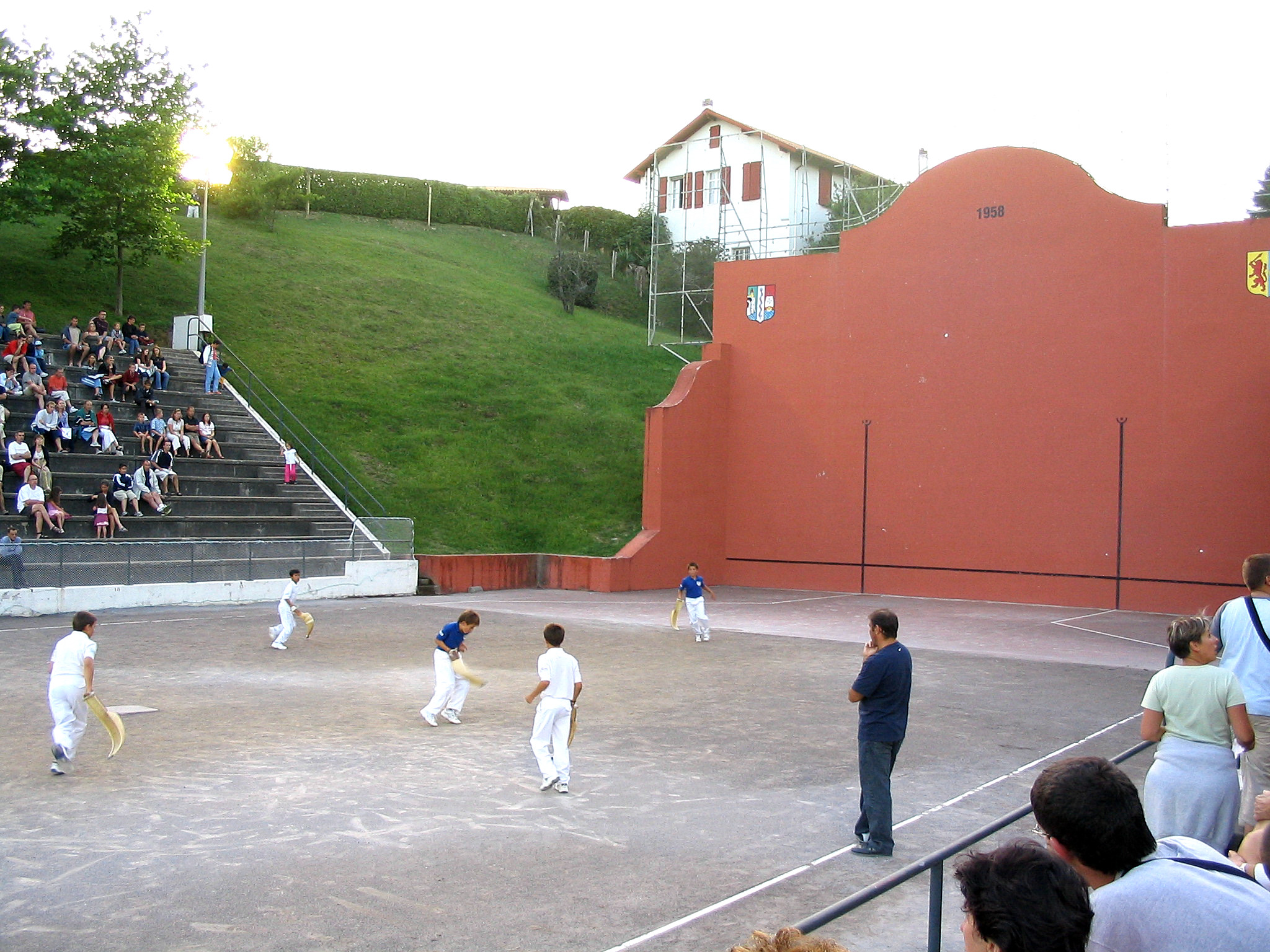
Chistera game in Bidart

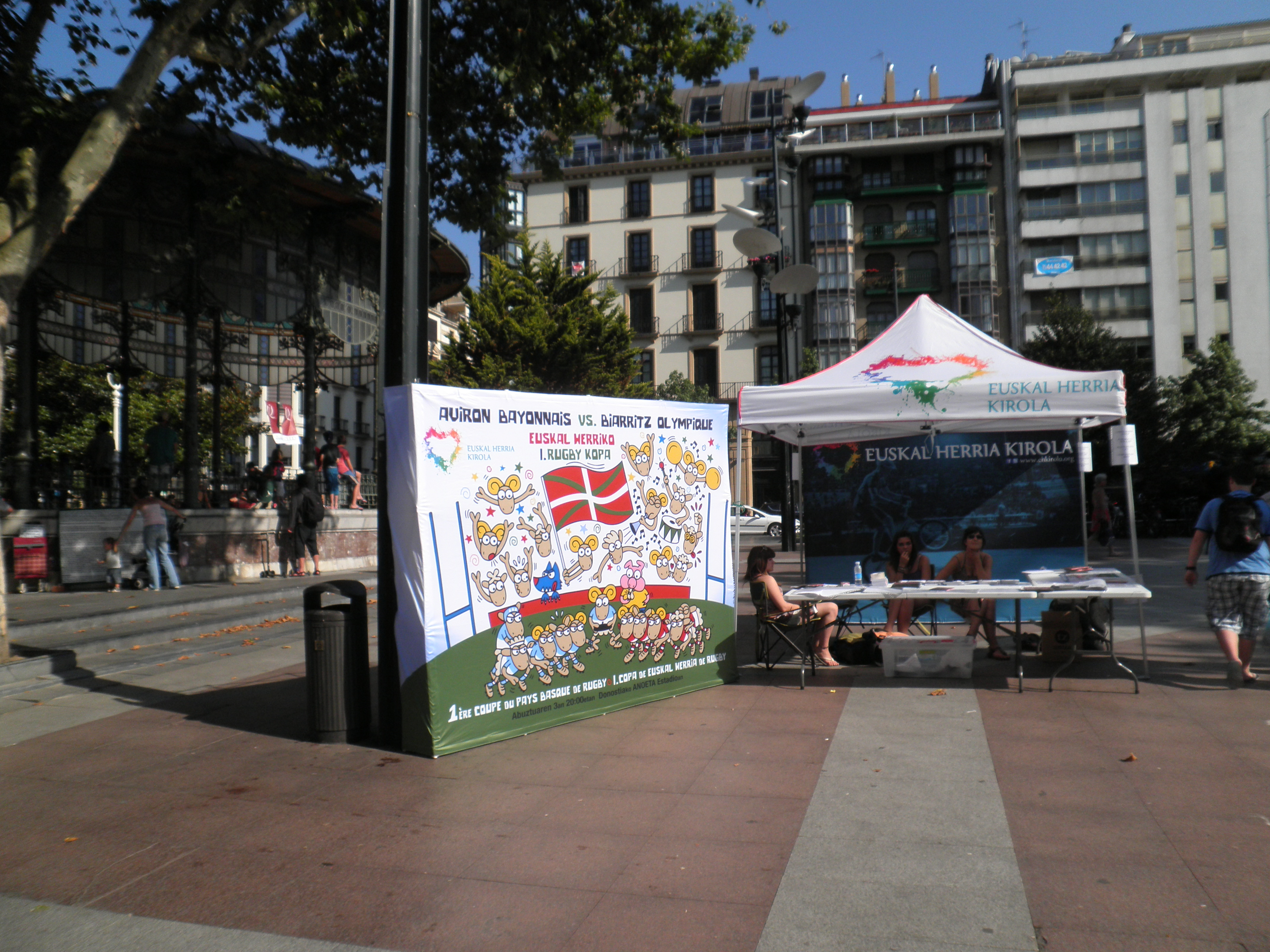
Stall in support of a Basque rugby selection

Basque sport has developed along the lines of the European countries. Originating from medieval games and rural sports based on intra- and inter-community rivalry and challenges, Basque native sports have specialized and expanded up to date, with various degrees of success. Basque pelota (especially esku-huska, handball) and rowing races are highly popular, while traditional bowls or hole drilling have remained largely local, limited to occasional events and celebrations.

Like overall in Europe, football (soccer) caught on early on in time expanding from its main influence focus in Bilbao (early 20th century), after it was imported by English iron industry operators from southern England. Spanish 1st League teams include Athletic de Bilbao, Real Sociedad, and SD Eibar in the 2014–15 season. Rugby union is not played at a professional level in the Southern Basque Country, but bears witness to a loyal following and important teams in Gipuzkoa and Biscay, like, Getxo Rugby Taldea, AMPO Ordizia and more playing in the Spanish Top League. Basque rugby does hold a higher, professional profile in the French Rugby League, with the Biarritz Olympique (BO) and the Aviron Bayonnais playing in the top-flight.

Mountaineering (hill walking, trekking) is a signature Basque sport with early entrenched roots in its history. The territory numbers 40,000 plus members associated in local federate mountain clubs, one of the highest concentrations in the world, ranging from family outings to the most competitive specialities (skiing, rock climbing, high mountain trekking...). The leisurely activity took on an institutional shape in 1924 with the establishment of the Basque-Navarrese Federation at Elgeta. One of its most memorable historic feats remains the 1980 expedition to the Everest, topped by Martin Zabaleta along with the sherpa Pasang Temba (14 May 1980). Other mountaineers with worldwide recognition include Juanito Oiarzabal, Edurne Pasaban, Iñaki Ochoa de Olza, or the brothers Iñurrategi.
