= Uxue Alberdi =

Basque writer

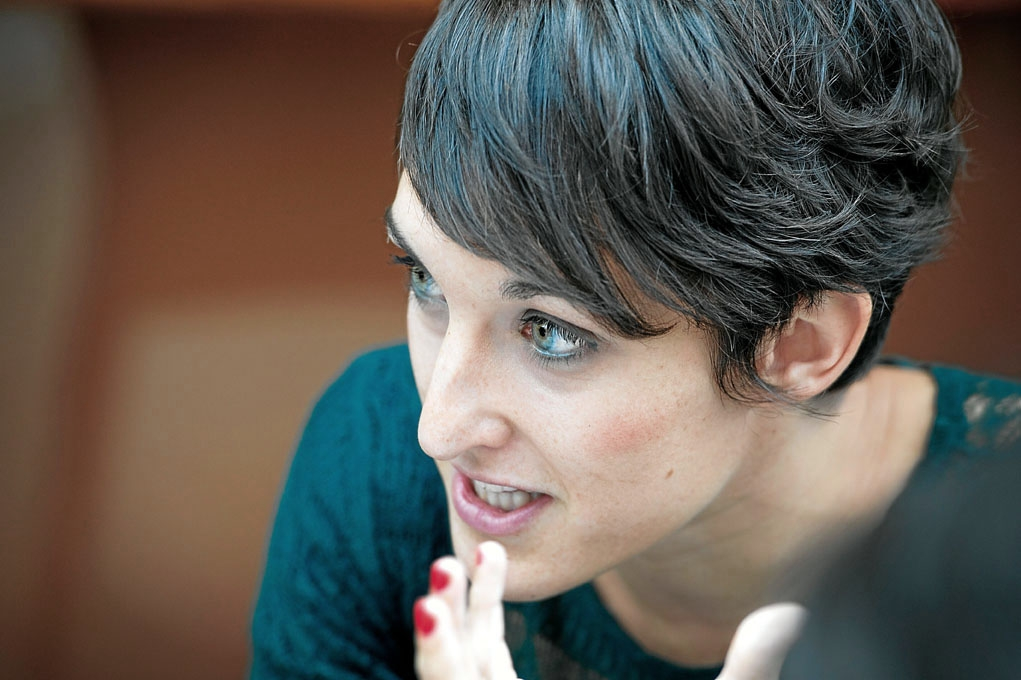
- Uxue Alberdi (2014)
- Born: Uxue Alberdi Estibaritz; 18 March 1984 (age 41); Elgoibar, Gipuzkoa, Spain
- Occupation: writer; bertsolari
- Language: Basque
- Notable works: Besarkada; Jenisjoplin; Kontrako eztarritik

Uxue Alberdi (The chair game) (2 minutes)

Uxue Alberdi (Besarkada) (1 minute)

Uxue Alberdi Estibaritz (Elgoibar, Gipuzkoa, 18 March 1984) is a Basque writer and bertsolari.

== Biography ==
She studied at the Leioa campus and graduated in journalism.

She started winning Bertsolaritza competitions in 2003, Julene Azpeitia from Durango was the first, followed by the Xenpelar Award in 2006, and the Osinalde Award for young bertsolari in 2008.

In 2005, thanks to the Igartza scholarship for young writers, she wrote his first book: Aulki bat elurretan (2007). In 2007, thanks also to another creative scholarship, the Joseba Jaka Scholarship, she wrote the book Aulki jokoa (2009). In 2013, she published Euli-giro and, in 2017, Jenisjoplin, by the publisher Susa.

In 2010, she delved into children's literature by publishing the story Ezin dut eta zer? In 2016, she won the Euskadi Prize for Children's and Youth Literature in Basque with Besarkada. She teaches literature workshops, writes opinion articles, and also works as a translator and lyricist. Together with Ainhoa Agirreazaldegi, she launched the so-called Feminist Bertsolaritza School.

== Literary awards ==
- 2016 - Euskadi Literatura Sariak for Besarkada
- 2017 - 111 Akademia saria for Jenisjoplin
- 2020 - Euskadi Literatura Sariak - Basque essay - for Kontrako eztarritik

== Bertsolaritza ==
- Great Bertsolari Championship
  - semi-final (1): 2009
- Gipuzkoa Bertsolari Championship
  - semi-final (1): 2007
- Awards:
  - Xenpelar award (1): 2006
  - Osinalde award (1): 2008

== Selected works ==
=== Novels ===
- Aulki bat elurretan (2007, Elkar)
- Aulki-jokoa (2009, Elkar)
- Euli giro (2013, Susa)
- Jenisjoplin (2017, Susa)
- Dendaostekoak (2020, Susa)

=== Essays ===
- Kontrako eztarritik: emakume bertsolarien testigantzak (2019, Susa)

=== Children's and youth literature ===
- Ezin dut eta zer?, (2011, Elkar)
- Marizikina naiz eta zer? (2012, Elkar)
- Zure denboraren truke (2013, Elkar)
- Txikitzen zaretenean (2013, Pamiela)
- Bi kobazulo (2015, Elkar)
- Besarkada (2015, Elkar)
- Poza (2018, Elkar)
