= Kortajarena =

Kortajarena is a Basque surname. Notable people with the surname include:

- Jon Kortajarena (born 1985), Spanish male model
- José Ángel Iribar, Spanish footballer (maternal surname)
- Lazkao Txiki (Joxe Miguel Iztueta Cortajarena), Spanish musician
