= Miren Amuriza =

Spanish bertsolari and Biscayan-language writer

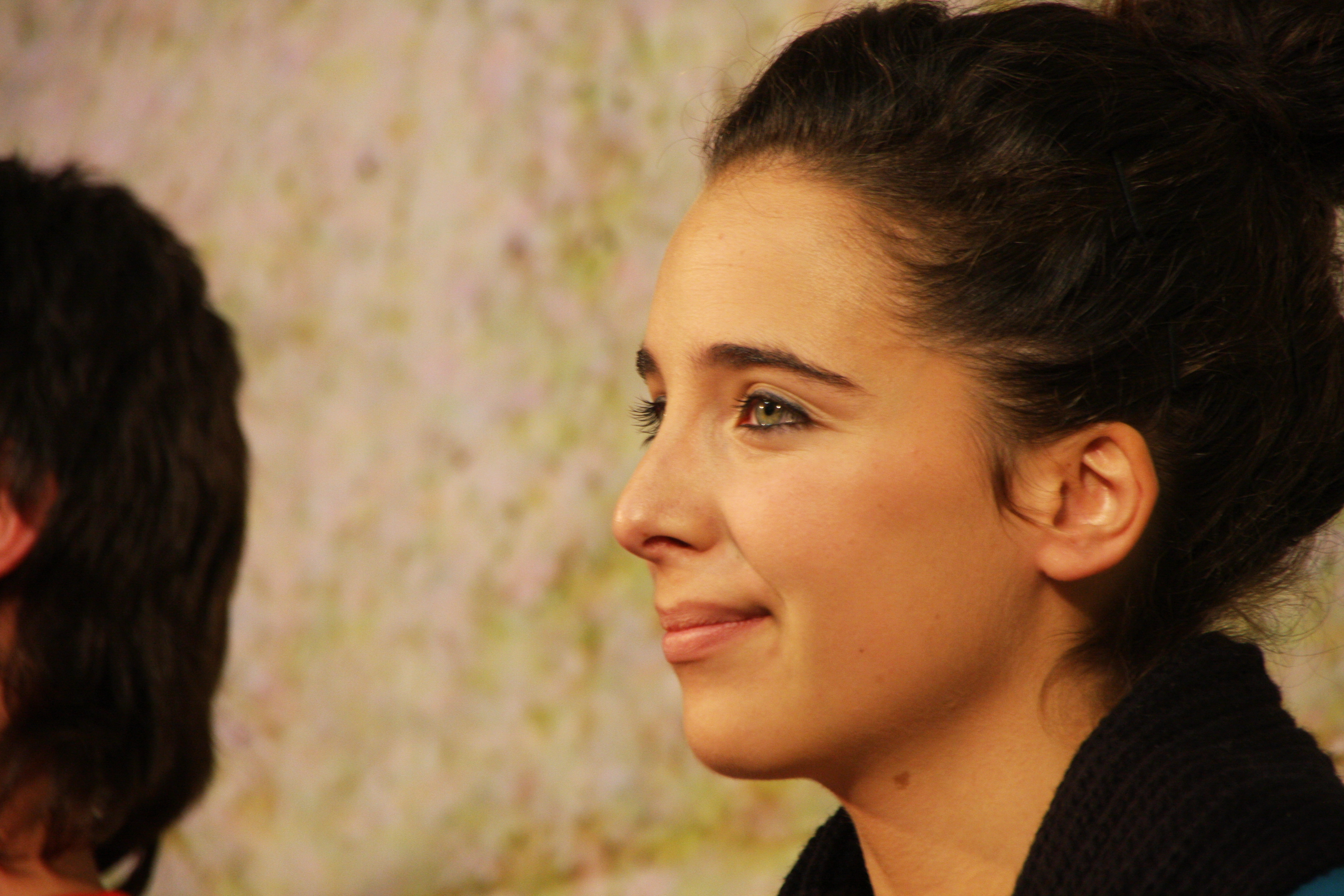
- Amuriza in 2011
- Born: Miren Amuriza Plaza; March 1, 1990 (age 36); Berriz, Biscay, Spain
- Education: University of the Basque Country
- Occupations: bertsolari; Biscayan writer
- Employer: Mondragon University
- Awards: Premio Igartza

Miren Amuriza Plaza (born March 1, 1990) is a Spanish bertsolari and Biscayan writer. She has collaborated with some music groups, singing and writing lyrics. In 2017, she was the recipient of the Premio Igartza.

== Biography ==
Miren Amuriza has lived in the world of Bertsolaritza since she was young. She accompanied her bertsolari parents from town to town, watching them sing. However, her parents never encouraged Miren to follow the same passion. She herself decided to follow in the footsteps of her father, Xabier Amuriza, who has always been the main point of reference for her in this profession.

Amuriza has a degree in Basque language Philology from the University of the Basque Country and has a master's degree in Teaching Qualification in Compulsory Secondary Education.

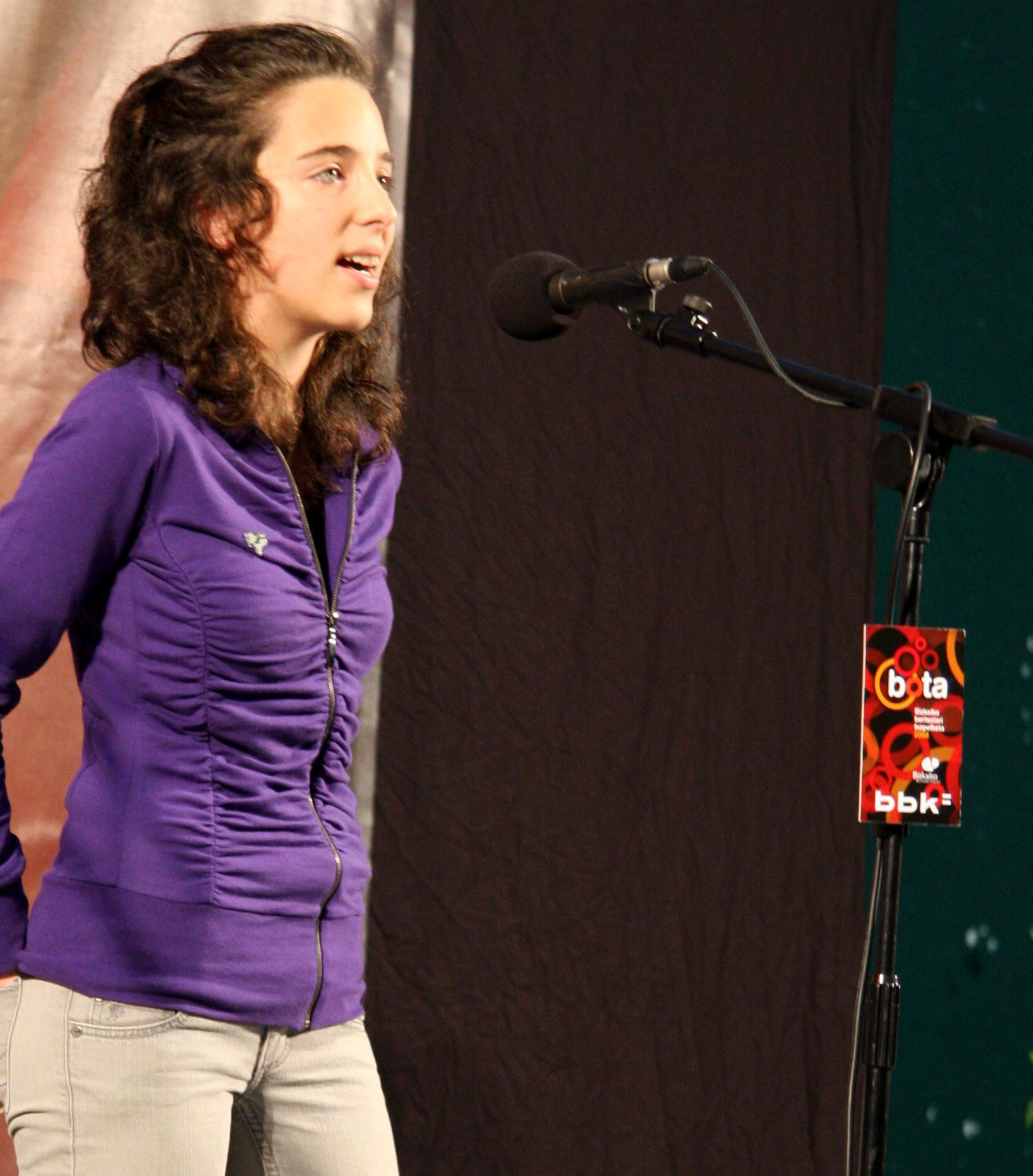
(2008)

In 2002, she sang for the first time in public when she participated in the Vizcaya school championship, in the El Carmen hall in Bilbao, and in 2003, she won the youngest category of this championship. That same year was the first time that she shared the stage together with her father, singing in the bertso-afari de Andikoa. In 2006, she participated in the Vizcaya school championship where she was proclaimed champion in the senior category and was also part of the Basque school championship where she would be a finalist. Two years later, she won the championship, and she also made her debut in the Vizcaya bertsos championship in which she participated three times, obtaining her best result in 2010, placing third. When she came of age, she appeared on television on the ETB 1 channel together with other bertsolaris such as her father, as well as Jexux Arzallus, Amets Arzallus, and Maddalen Arzallus, participating in the Euskal Kantuen Gaua program singing the popular song Gure Aitak amari. In 2009, she began her participation in the national championship of Bertsolaritza reaching the second phase. In 2010, on the occasion of the bertso eguna, together with her friend and fellow bertsolari, Maddalen Arzallus, they paid a resounding tribute to their mothers.

In the 2016 Vizcaya championship, Amuriza created a new rhythm for the verses, covering a song by Chavela Vargas.

Amuriza works as a teacher at the Mondragon University. She also likes to write. She collaborates with the Bertsolaritza association working as a teacher at the Bertsolaritza school giving classes to children.

She has collaborated with the magazine Anboto and the magazine Argia writing opinion articles. Her work has also been published in the newspaper Berria. As for literature, in 2017, she won the Igartza Award for the Paperezko txoriak project. In 2018, she obtained, together with Askoa Etxebarrieta, the lanku grant to develop the Tan takatan project, a project that tries to combine copla and flamenco.

== Awards ==
- 2017, Premio Igartza

== Bertsolaritza ==
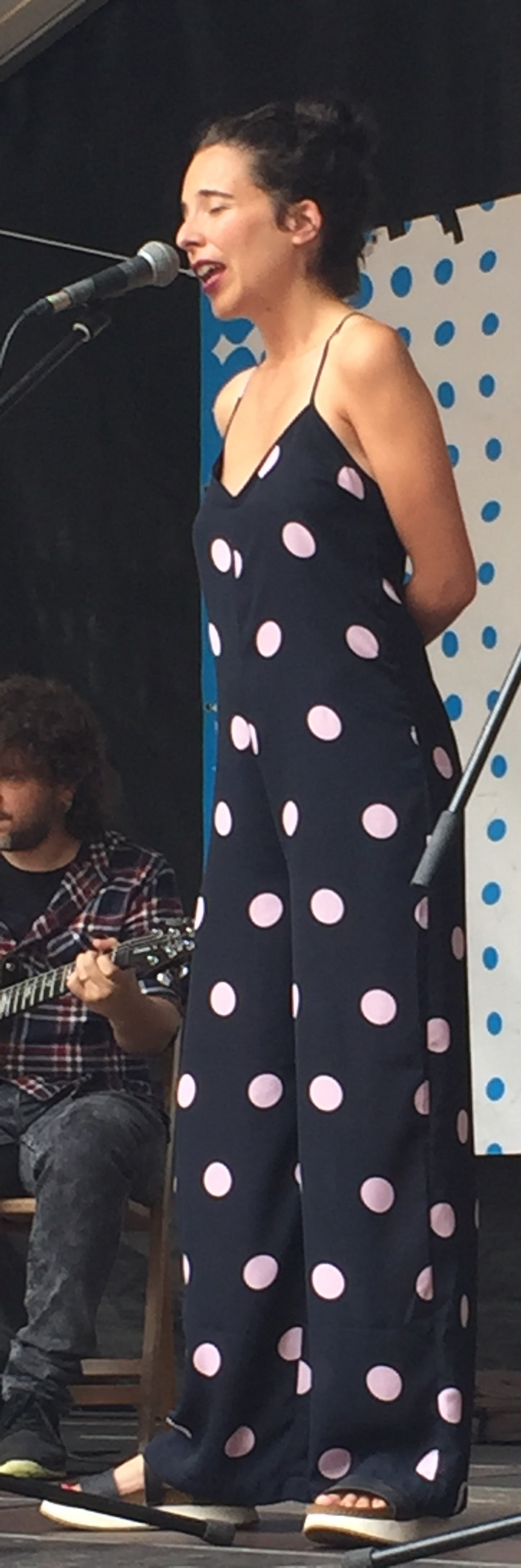
(2018)

- Great Bertsolari Championship
  - Bertsolari main tournament 2009: semi-final, second phase.
  - Bertsolari main tournament 2013: quarter finals.
  - Bertsolari main championship 2017: semifinal, second phase.
- Campeonato de versolaris de Vizcaya
  - Campeonato de Vizcaya 2008: semifinal
  - Campeonato de Vizcaya 2010: finalist, third place
  - Campeonato de Vizcaya 2012: finalist, fifth place
  - Campeonato de Vizcaya 2014: semifinal
  - Campeonato de Vizcaya 2016: finalist, seventh place
- Campeonato escolar de versolaris
  - Basque School Championship 2008: winner
  - Basque School Championship 2006: second place
  - Campeonato escolar de Vizcaya 2006: winner (majores)
  - Campeonato escolar de Vizcaya 2003: winner (little ones)

== Literature (selected works) ==
- Pupu eta Lore ikusi-makusi (Nor gara ?) (2016, Elkarlanean)
- Bainera bete itsaso (Album illustratuak) (2016, Elkarlanean)
- Badator korrika ! (Plaza ipuinak) (2016, Elkarlanean)
- Pirritx hizkuntza zer ote ? (Nor gara ?) (2016, Elkarlanean)
- Porrotx hizkuntzaren arnasa (Nor gara ?) (2016, Elkarlanean)
- Marimotots euskara ikasten (Nor gara ?) (2016, Elkarlanean)
- Patata, patata ! (Plaza ipuinak) (2016, Elkarlanean)
- Amalur (PIRRITX, PORROTX ETA MARIMOTOTS) (2016, Elkarlanean)
- Mattin eta Kattin (Familia mila kolore) (2018, Elkarlanean)
- Hodei (Familia mila kolore) (2018, Elkarlanean)
- Kakuenea (Familia mila kolore) (2018, Elkarlanean)
- Larunbata (FAMILIA MILA KOLORE) (2018, Elkarlanean)
- Basa (2019, Elkarlanean). Traducido al español: Basa por Miren Agur Meabe (2021, consonni)
- Kolonutt (2020, elkarlanean)
