= Pello Errota =

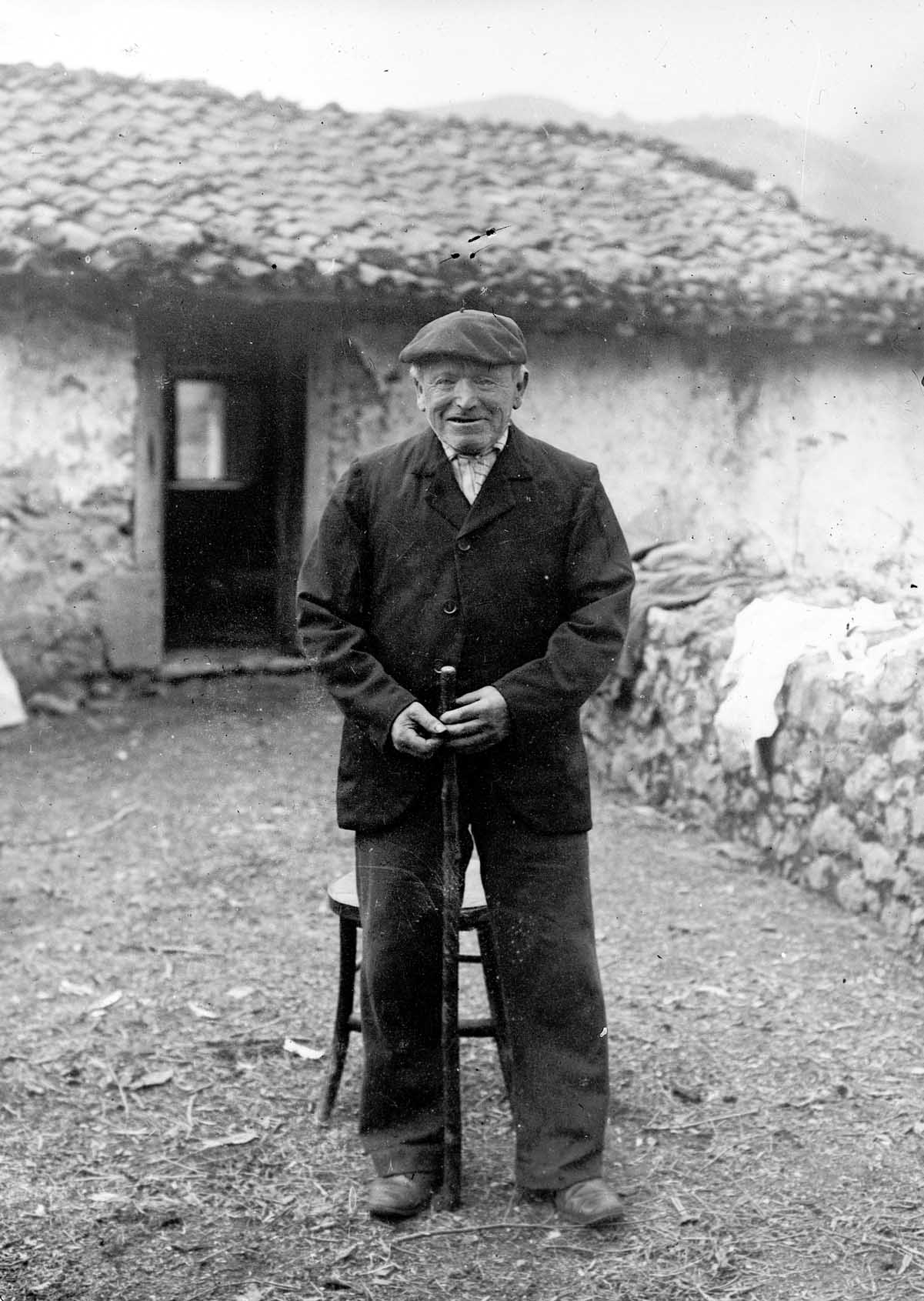
Pello Errota

Pedro Jose Elizegi “Pello Errota” (1840–1919) was born on the estate of Goikoerrota's Mill near Asteasu, a town in the Basque region of Gipuzkoa, and was one of the best known bertsolaris of all time.

A miller by trade, he married Joakina Antonia Bengoetxea from Zizurkil. A small man, he was keen and smart. His quick thinking and singing earned him a bright and prominent role in the bertso scene. As he was a miller and his income was scant, he would accept any request to sing. Good-humored and with a smile always on his lips, he had irony and the capacity to tease. Frequently petitioned to perform, he never refused.

Pello Errota sung with all bertsolaris of his era performing at fairs, weddings, contests, etc. He also published bertso-paperak (verses printed on paper). He once won a contest that was disputed on the Euskal Jaia of Azpeitia. He also went to the Basque Fairs of Euskara from Elizondo alongside José Bernardo Otaño. He became so popular that in 1895 some Americans took him to Argentina, paying him the return ticket.

He was 78 years old when he died at his home in Goikoerrota. His daughter Mikaela worked for many years copying her father's works and thanks to her amazing memory the bertsos composed by him, and that she herself wrote, have been preserved for over 80 years. Mikaela also wrote a book which related the life of her father. It narrates her family's history, and the Carlist Wars among other things.
