= Joan Amades =

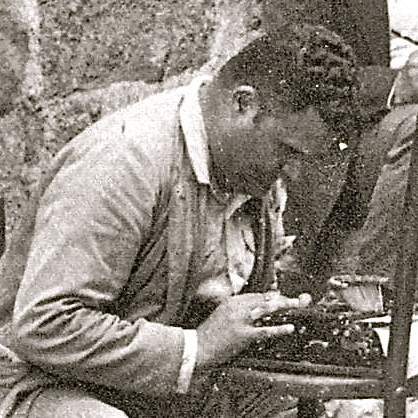
Joan Amades i Gelats

Joan Amades i Gelats (Catalan pronunciation: [ʒuˈan əˈmaðəz i ʒəˈlats]; Barcelona, 23 July 1890 - 17 January 1959) was a Catalan ethnologist and folklorist. An autodidact, he worked at the historical archive of the city of Barcelona and at the Museum of Industry and Popular Arts of the same city. From 1956 onwards, he collaborated with UNESCO. He was also an important promoter of Esperanto and founded the Federació Esperantista Catalana (Catalan Esperanto association). Perhaps the most important book in his large bibliography is Costumari Català (a collection of Catalan customs), the main work for the study of Catalan popular culture.

== In popular culture ==
- In 2012, 2princesesbarbudes released the album Cançons i rimetes, a minimalist and pop reinterpretation of songs collected by Amades in the book Folklore de Catalunya.

== Most important works ==
- Les diades populars catalanes (1932–1949) (the Catalan popular feasts)
- Les cent millor cançons populars (1949) (the 100 best folk songs)
- Refranyer català comentat (1951) (commented collection of Catalan sayings)
- Les cent millors rondalles populars (1953) (the 100 best popular fairy tales)
- Costumari Català (1950–1956) (collection of Catalan customs)
- Guia de les festes tradicionals de Catalunya. Itinerari per tot l´any (1958) (guide to traditional feasts in Catalonia. Itinerary for the whole year)

== Bibliography ==
- Antoni Anguela, Lluís Calvo [et al.], El món de Joan Amades, Barcelona, Departament de Cultura de la Generalitat de Catalunya, 1990. (Joan Amades’ World, in Catalan)
