= Lazkao Txiki =

Basque poet and musician (1926–1993)

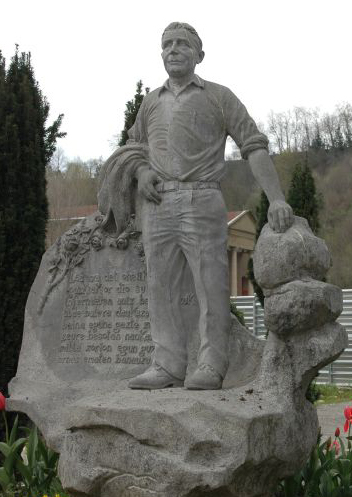

Joxe Miguel Iztueta Cortajarena (September 15, 1926 – April 3, 1993), better known as Lazkao Txiki was a Basque bertsolari poet and musician.

Iztueta was born in Lazkao, in the Goierri region of the province of Gipuzkoa, in the Basque Autonomous Community in the southern Basque Country in northern Spain. He had six brothers. He started attending school when he was 8. When he was 9, he watched bertsolaris for the first time, from which he developed an early and lasting enthusiasm for Basque bertsolaritza music.

Early in his life Lazkao Txiki worked as a bricklayer and farmer, and sold fodder for cows. His first public performance as a bertsolari took place in Legorreta in 1936. He came first in a competition for young improvisational musicians in 1950. Twelve years later he entered the prestigious championship (txapelketa), among the best bertsolaris of the Basque Country, reaching the finals. He ranked second in the same event three years later, coming up finalist again in 1967.

He continued to perform regularly until January 1993, when he suffered a heart attack following a public performance which included a tribute to Aita Santiago Onaindia and Alfonso Irigoyen. He died in San Sebastián in April 1993 following three months in a coma.

A bertsolari contest named after Lazkao Txiki, the Lazkao Txiki Bertsopaper Lehiaketa, was launched in 2007.
