= Pernando Amezketarra =

Fernando Bengoetxea Altuna (1764–1823), commonly known as Pernando Amezketarra or—not so often—Fernando Amezketarra, was a bertsolari and humorist in the Basque region of Spain.

He was born in the village of Amezketa (Gipuzkoa), specifically in the farm named Espizaltxe, on October 10, 1764. Since he was a child he was known for his wit. He became an indispensable character in every celebration. He worked as a shepherd, as most people in his village in those days. He married Maria Joxepa Sagastume, and they had 9 children, while they lived in Ixpille and Azentzin Txikia farms where he died.

He was honoured in many occasions. His anecdotes were collected and published by Gregorio de Mújica under the title of Pernando Amezketarra, a successful book many times reissued.

In the 1990s, ETB 1 broadcast a TV serial about this character.
