= 2princesesbarbudes =

Catalan band

2princesesbarbudes is a Catalan band known for minimalist pop music created using toy instruments such as toy pianos, xylophones, melodicas, ukuleles, small accordions, and timpani, led by musicians Marc Marcé and Helena Casas.

== History ==
In 2008, 2princesesbarbudes participated in the album Musiquetes per a la Bressola with a version of the song "La pastoreta". In 2012, they released the album Cançons i rimetes, a minimalist and pop reinterpretation of songs collected by Joan Amades in the book Folklore de Catalunya, with the show premiering at La Mostra d'Igualada that same year.

At the Fira Mediterrania in Manresa in 2014, the group presented the album and show Enciclopèdia baixeta de la nit, a series of compositions about the night. This work was translated and adapted into Basque under the name Gaueko entziklopeida koxkorra, with the collaboration of bertsolari Maialen Lujanbio on the song "Ondo lo egin", and was premiered at the Durangoko Azoka book and music fair in 2014. In 2015, they released Sempre de vacances, eleven songs in a documentary ornithological format about how swallows build nests, what they eat, parenting, travels, clothing, singing, and dreams.

In 2019, they presented the album La bona vida at the Mercat de Música Viva de Vic, ten songs that explore the life and customs of early humans during the Paleolithic era to offer a comparative analysis of modern life and human evolution, with fun lyrics and diverse rhythms ranging from yé-yé pop to tropical rhythms, ska, Romani music, and swing.

== Discography ==
- 2011: Cançons i rimetes
- 2013: Enciclopèdia baixeta de la nit
- 2015: Sempre de vacances
- 2019: La bona vida
