= Maialen Lujanbio =

Spanish bertsolari singer (born 1976)

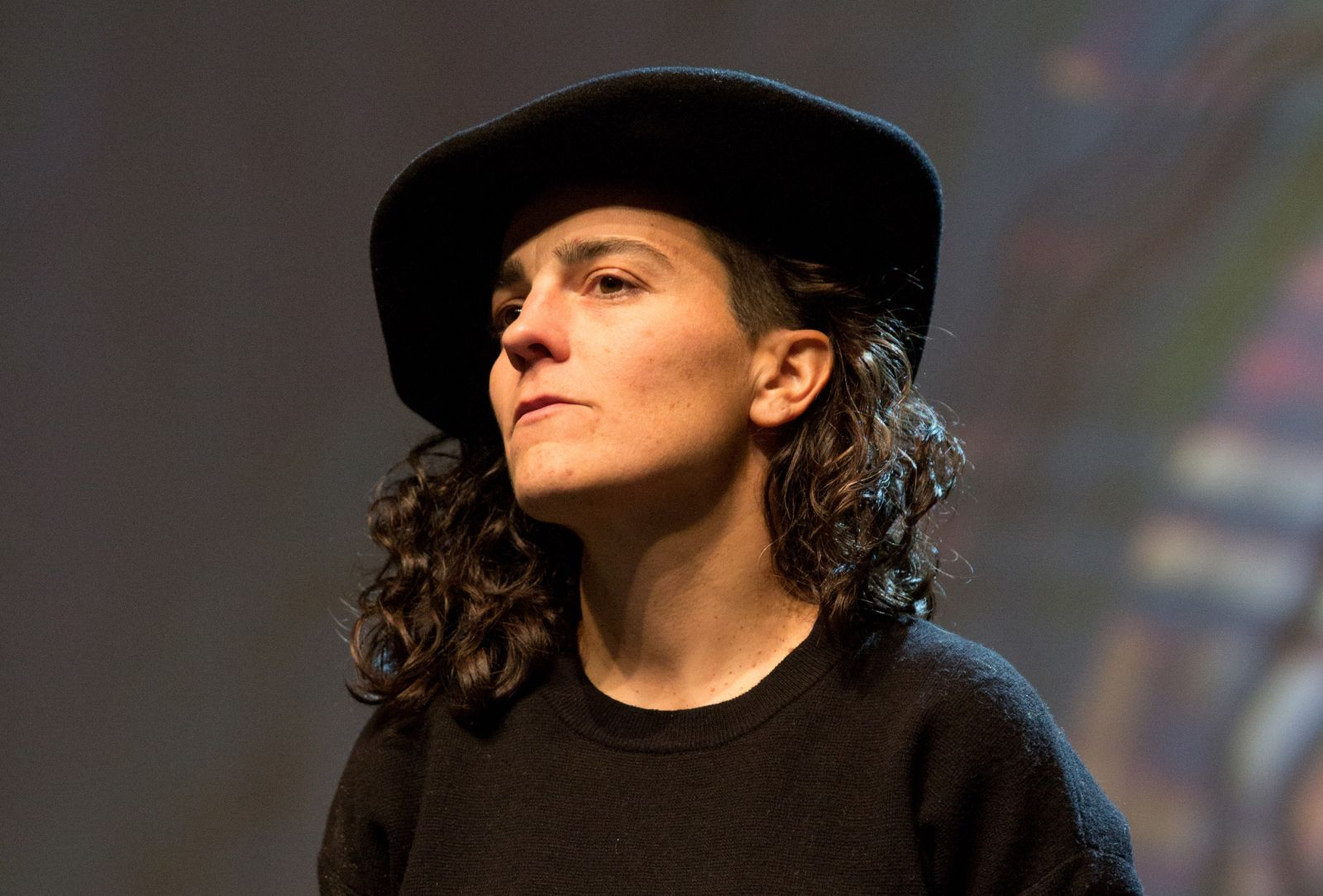
- winning again in 2017
- Born: 26 November 1976 (age 49); Hernani, Gipuzkoa, Spain
- Education: University of the Basque Country
- Occupations: singing, competing and writing
- Known for: bertsolari

Maialen Lujanbio (born 26 November 1976) is a Basque poet and bertsolari. She composes her oral poetry in the Basque language and, having won the Bertsolari Championship of the Basque Country three times, she is considered one of the best bertsolaris in history and the only woman to ever reach her level.

== Life ==
Lujanbio was born in Hernani in 1976. She took an interest in the Basque oral tradition of poetry whilst at secondary school. She attended specialist classes and continued to practise whilst at the University of the Basque Country. She won prizes at the junior and then senior level introducing novel approaches to the poetry discipline. In 1994 she became the Champion of Gipuzkoa.

Maialen Lujanbio's composing a bertso at the 2009 Txapelketa Nagusi.

In 2003 she wrote for the Basque newspaper, Berria, completing a column each day.

In 2007-8 she took a postgraduate course at Mondragon University in the Basque language and its transmission.

In 2009, Maialen Lujanbio Zugasti became the first woman to win the Basque-Country-wide championship. In 2013 she was second after Amets Arzallus and in 2017 and 2022 she won for the second and third time the Bertsolari Main Championship.

Lujanbio collaborated with pop band 2princesesbarbudes on the song "Ondo lo egin" from the album Gaueko entziklopeida koxkorra, a Basque adaptation of the Catalan original, Enciclopèdia baixeta de la nit. The adaptation premiered at the Durangoko Azoka book and music fair in 2014.

=== Solo challenge in 2009 ===
Maialen, you are a doctor. You're observing two children suffering from cancer organising a wheelchair race in a hospital corridor, to which she composed the following bertso:

Zabal-zabalik geratzen zaizkit nere begi nere aho.
Hospital hontan sartu zirala, denbora joan da luzaro:
abuztu, irail eta urria bihurtu zaie azaro,
ta zai-zai daude noiz irtengo edo noiz aginduko “akabo!”.
Elkarri nola deitzen dioten “burusoiltxo!” Eta “kalbo”,
minbizi duten bi umeeri begira-begira nago.
Eurengan minak badu indarra, baina bizitzak gehiago.

Egiten dute irrifar eta begitan dute dizdira
etsitzen dute nahiz ta lagunak eta eskola desira.
Denborarako egin zieten laguntxoei despedida
eta orain biak hemen dabiltza juerga, salto, buelta, biba.
Tututxo batek lotuta dauzka oxigenoan harira
baina kontentu ta lasai daude jolas hoietan argi da
ta maitasuna behar dutenak euren gurasoak.

Aita ta ama hor ikusten ditut ta nola ez konprenitu?
Esperantzazko eskatzen dute arren zerbait zirrikitu.
Euren aurrean negar ein nahi ez ta barrun ezin kabitu
urruntzen dira umeengandik ta orduan begiak blaitu.
Nik gurasoei esaten diet «Jarraitu! Gogor jarraitu!
Zuen umeak indartsu dira hemen ez da deus amaitu
ze bizitzeko gogoa dunak bizitzea lortzen baitu

Translation:

I am left mouth agape and with eyes wide
you have been in this hospital for a long time
August, September and October have turned into November,
and them wondering when it's time to leave or call an end
Calling each other "baldie" and "baldielocks",
I am looking after two children with cancer.
Strong is their cancer, but stronger so their life.

With a giggle and a twinkle in their eyes
Though missing their friends and school.
They bade farewell to their little friends for the time being
and here they are having a ball, jumping and turning with a yippie aye yay.
A small tube connecting them to their oxygen
but clearly they are content and calm in their games
and it is clear it is their parents who need love.

I see their mother and father and how could I not understand?
In hope they beg for a glimmer of hope.
Not wanting to cry in front of them and unable to control their tears
they move away from the children and then their eyes turn wet.
I tell the parents "Keep going! Don't give up!
Your children are strong, thise is not the end
for those who have the will to live will live.
