= Bilintx =

Basque writer

Indalecio Bizcarrondo "Bilintx"
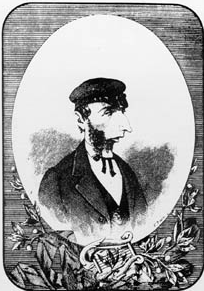
- Portrait of Bilintx

Background information
- Also known as: Bilintx, Moko
- Born: 1831
- Origin: San Sebastián, Gipuzkoa, Basque Country, Spain
- Died: July 21, 1876
- Genres: Bertsolaritza

Indalecio Bizcarrondo, also known as Bilintx (San Sebastián, 1831–1876) was a Basque improvisational poet or bertsolari living in Spain, who wrote largely in the Basque language. He associated in the liberal circles of the city, with the likes of Serafin Baroja and Manterola, in the period extending between the two main Carlist Wars.

The imprint of his life's experiences, including a number of accidents and failed love affairs, are evident in his poetry. He is considered a Romantic in style, and was an enthusiastic reader of Spanish romantic poets such as Becquer. He worked also in the bertso paperak style, producing poems on sheets of paper that could be sold loose and sung by the people, some of which caught on in popular culture. Bein batian Loyolan (spelling of that period) remains one of his most memorable poems, nowadays sung to John Denver's tune Annie's song popularised by the local music band Egan in the 1980s.

He was killed by a Carlist grenade shelled on San Sebastián on the San Sebastián Day during the Second Carlist War. Coincidentally, he died after months of suffering the same day the Charters (Foruak) were abolished on 21 July 1876.
