= Txirrita =

Jose Manuel Lujanbio Retegi
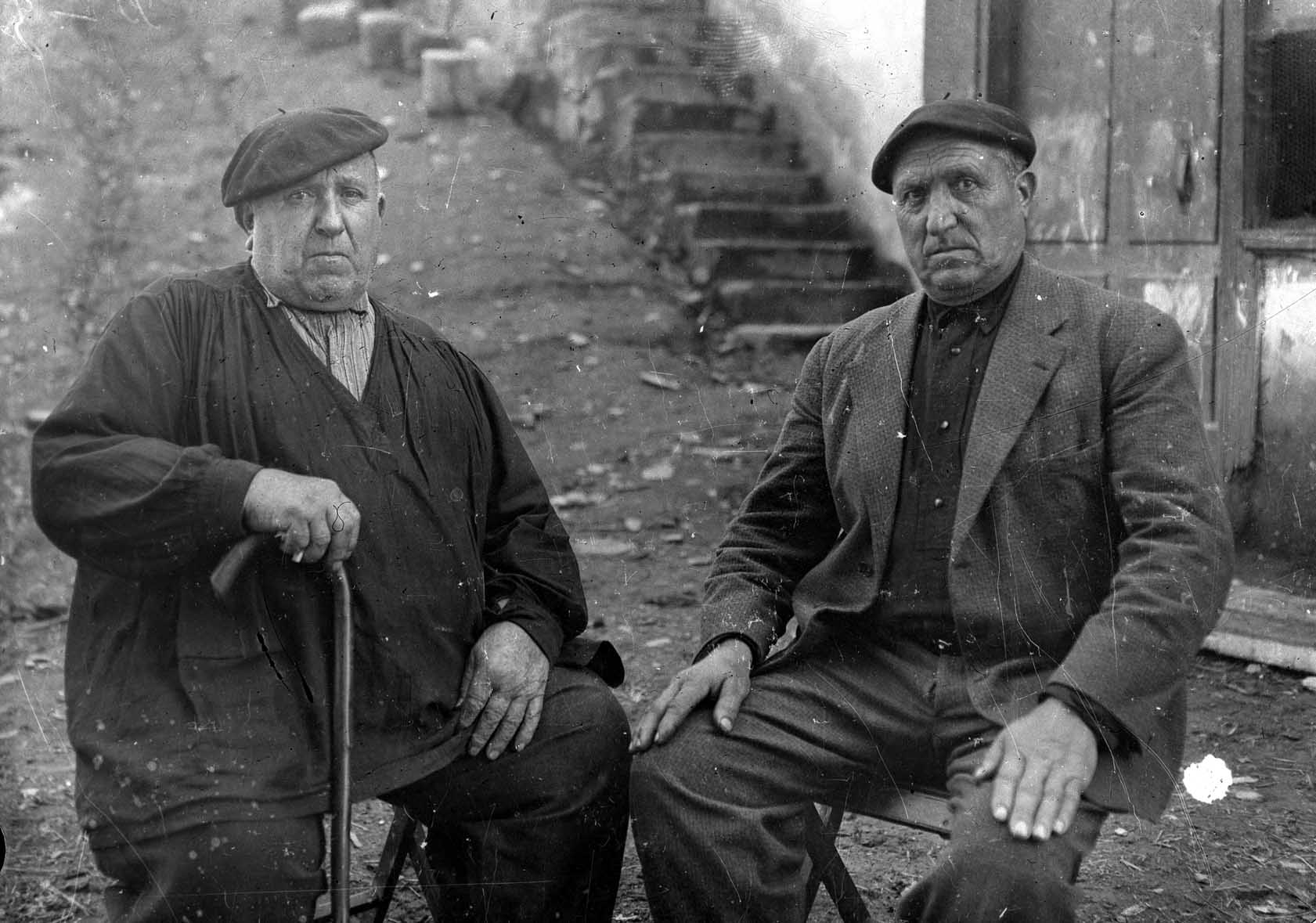
- Txirrita (on the left) and Saiburu

Background information
- Also known as: Txirrita
- Born: August 14, 1860
- Origin: Hernani, Gipuzkoa, Basque Country, Spain
- Died: June 3, 1936 (aged 75)
- Genres: Bertsolaritza
- Occupation: Bricklayer

Jose Manuel Lujanbio Retegi (also known as Txirrita, [tʃiʁita]), born on Hernani in 1860 and died in Altza in 1936, was a Basque composer of verse, known as bertsolaris.

== Life ==
He was born in the Ereñozu neighborhood of Hernani and when he was still a child, his family moved to a baserri in Errenteria named Txirrita, from whence he acquired his nickname. In his last years he lived in the Gazteluene baserri in Altza.

Due to an accident he suffered in Goizueta in May 1936, on June 3 of the same year he died in the Gazteluene baserri, in Altza.

== Txirrita the bertsolari ==
Although he was heir to the baserri, he left the farm and started working as bricklayer. He began his career as a bertsolari aged 14, being in the company of bertsolaris much older than himself. He stood out by his sharp wit and agile tongue, and his witticisms left a lasting memory.

Many of his bertsos deal with social issues, and the thoughts and feelings of the lower classes. As Antonio Zavala was told, many people sought out Txirrita to ask him to compose a bertso against other people. The subject of many of these bertsos was that of unrequited love. Txirrita composed his bertsos on the subject required and his nephew would write them down, later putting them into print, and after selling them on the fairs.

Thanks to collective memory and collectors of bertso-papers like Antonio Zavala, many of these bertsos were recorded. Txirrita became the prototypical bertsolari - an old bachelor, reveller and rogue. Although he was a skillful bricklayer, he didn't enjoy work, and at every opportunity he would seek out a tavern to drink, sing bertsos or bet. Txirrita was unschooled and although he could read, he could not write, and he would dictate bertsos to his nephew.

In 1935 he was the runner-up in the first bertsolari championship of the Basque Country, and the year after won the championship.

== Legacy ==
In Bilbao, Hernani and Altza three streets bear his name. In Errenteria there is an industrial park called Txirrita-Maleo, named after its location between the farmhouses of Txirrita and Maleo.
