= Jerónimo de Ripalda =

Spanish Jesuit priest and author of a widely used catechism

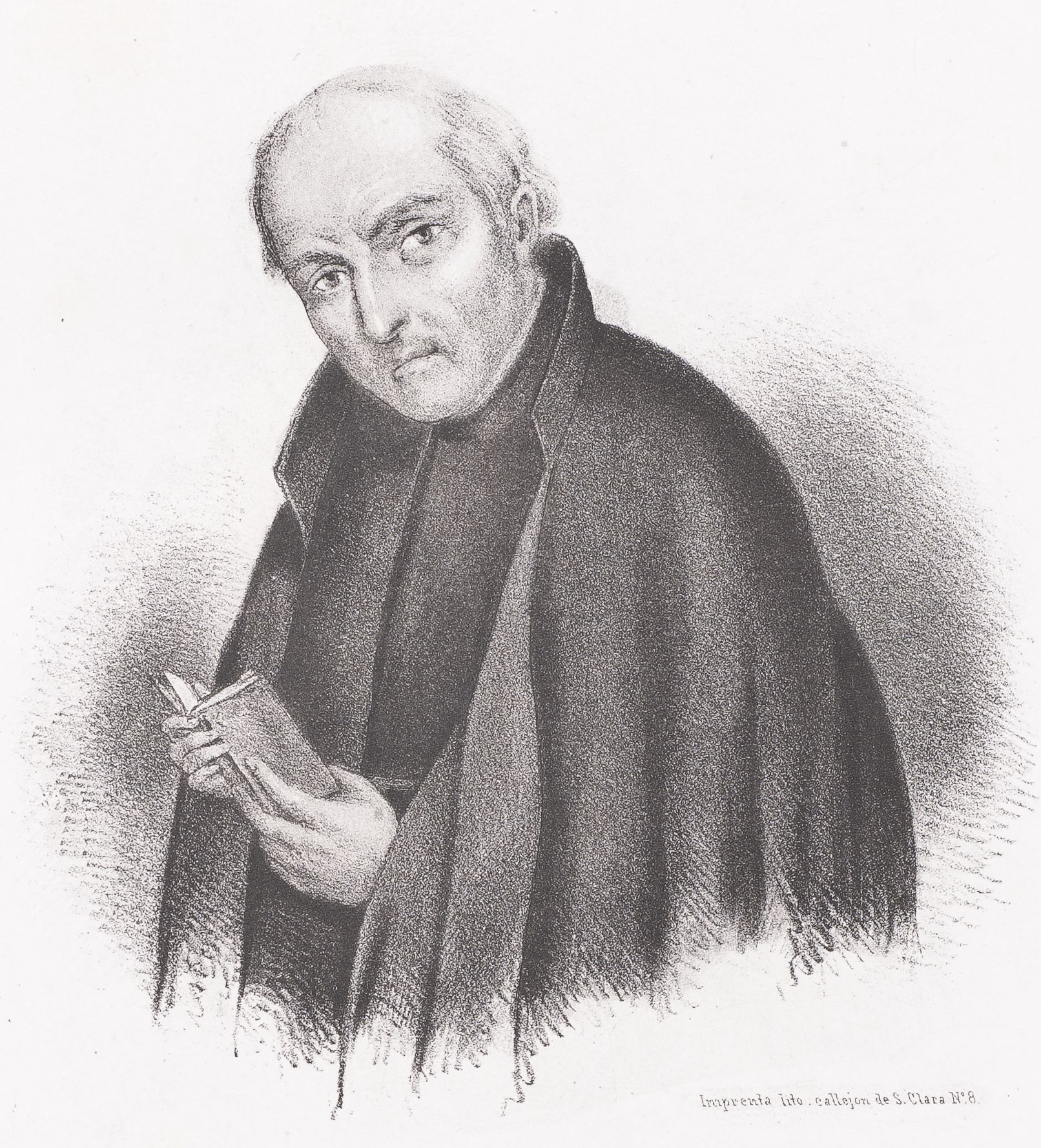
Engraved portrait of Jerónimo de Ripalda

Jerónimo de Ripalda (1535 – 21 April 1618) was a Spanish Jesuit priest and the author of the famous catechism Doctrina christiana con una exposición breve, compuesta por el Maestro Hieronymo de Ripalda de la Compañía de Iesús (Burgos: 1591).

== Biography ==
Jerónimo de Ripalda, of Basque ancestry, was born in Teruel in 1535. He was the son of the physician Bernardino de Ripalda, who had known Ignatius of Loyola when they studied in Alcalá. Bernardino firmly opposed his son's desire to enter the Society of Jesus, even obtaining a royal decree that he presented to the rector of the Jesuit college in Alcalá, where Jerónimo had enrolled at age 14 or 16. Nonetheless, he was unable to prevail, and his son entered the order.

Ripalda’s formation within the Society of Jesus took place in Gandía, Valencia, and again in Alcalá. He taught in Plasencia, Valladolid, and Ávila, and later served as rector of the Jesuit colleges in Villagarcía, Salamanca, Burgos, and Valladolid.

During his time in Salamanca, he was confessor to Teresa of Ávila. As she recounts in the prologue to the Book of the Foundations, she asked him to complete her account of the foundation of the first monastery of the Discalced Carmelite friars with an explanation of the seven additional monasteries.

Equipped with the innovations of the Council of Trent, these catechisms were taken to Spanish America, where they were translated into Indigenous languages. Ripalda’s catechism was translated into at least Nahuatl, Otomí, Purépecha, Zapotec, and various Mayan languages, among others. A Basque version was produced by Martín Ochoa de Capanaga in 1656.

== His name ==
In the historiography concerning Ripalda and his catechism, his name appears in multiple forms. The principal scholar of the catechism, Juan Manuel Sánchez, notes that Jesuit bibliographers generally refer to him as “Jerónimo Ripalda,” without the preposition “de”; only Father Uriarte includes it. However, in the numerous printed editions of the catechism, he appears as “Jerónimo de Ripalda,” which was the name he normally used.

The Enciclopedia Espasa lists him as "Jerónimo Martínez de Ripalda" without explanation, likely due to confusion with another Spanish Jesuit theologian, Juan Martínez de Ripalda (1641–1707).

== Works ==
In addition to his best-known work, Catecismo y exposición breve de la doctrina cristiana (Burgos, 1591; Toledo, 1618), which saw hundreds of reprints, he also published the following:

- A Spanish translation of Contemptu Mundi by Thomas à Kempis; three known editions, all identifying the translator only as “a Father of the Society of Jesus”:
  - Contemptu Mundi. De nuevo corregido por un Padre de la Compañía de Jesús, Alcalá de Henares, 1576.
  - Contemptu Mundi el más cumplido que hasta ahora se ha impreso, Sevilla, 1587.
  - Contemptu Mundi o de la Imitación de Cristo. Lib. IV. Amberes, 1612.
- Razonamiento que hace el pecador a Dios, Miguel Serrano, Madrid, 1614.
- Suave coloquio del pecador con Dios, Lérida, 1618.

== Bibliography ==
- Luis Resines, “Lectura crítica de los catecismos de Astete y Ripalda. Segunda parte,” Estudio Agustiniano 16 (1981), no. 2, p. 242.
- Biography of Jerónimo de Ripalda, Diccionario Biográfico Español of the Real Academia de la Historia.
- Entry “Ripalda, Jerónimo Martínez de” in the Auñamendi Basque Encyclopedia.
