= Great Bertsolari Championship =

Basque contest of improvised poetry

The Great Bertsolari Championship (Bertsolari Txapelketa Nagusia) is a championship among bertsolaris from all over the Basque Country. It is contested every four years and the current 2022 champion is Maialen Lujanbio.

== History ==
It was first organized by Euzko Gaztedi in 1935 and 1936. Then there was a hiatus of the Spanish Civil War and its subsequent repression. Euskaltzaindia took some years of organizational responsibility in 1960, 1962, 1965, and 1967. The next, with a thirteen-year break, were held in 1980 and 1982, and Xabier Amuriza won both. Although he was from Biscay, he sung in Standard Basque instead of the Biscayan dialect, breaking the mold, and establishing a precedent for modern bertsolaritza. Since 1986, the Basque Association of Friends of the Basque Country has organized the championship every four years.

== Winners ==
Year	Winner
1935	Inazio Eizmendi Manterola "Basarri"
1936	Jose Manuel Lujanbio Retegi "Txirrita"
1960	Inazio Eizmendi Manterola "Basarri"
1962	Manuel Olaizola Urbieta "Uztapide"
1965	Manuel Olaizola Urbieta "Uztapide"
1967	Manuel Olaizola Urbieta "Uztapide"
1980	Xabier Amuriza Sarrionandia
1982	Xabier Amuriza Sarrionandia
1986	Sebastian Lizaso Iraola
1989	Jon Lopategi Lauzirika
1993	Andoni Egaña Makazaga
1997	Andoni Egaña Makazaga
2001	Andoni Egaña Makazaga
2005	Andoni Egaña Makazaga
2009	Maialen Lujanbio Zugasti
2013	Amets Arzallus Antia
2017	Maialen Lujanbio Zugasti
