= Bertsolaritza =

Basque art of improvised poetry

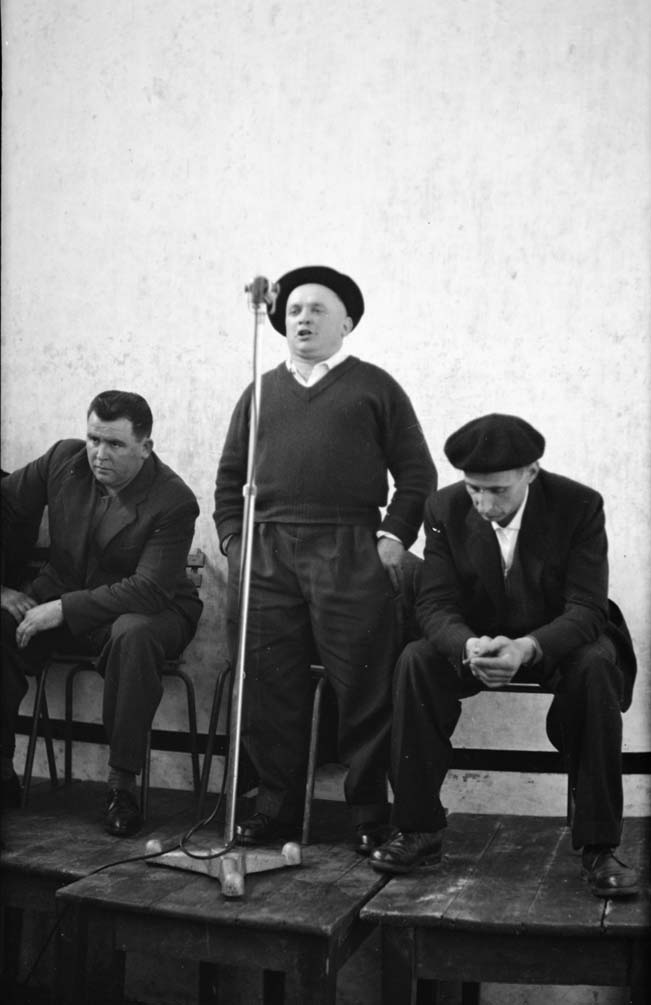
The bertsolari Mattin Treku composing a bertso in Sare in 1960

Txomin Ezponda composing a bertso

Bertsolaritza Basque pronunciation: [berˈts̺olaɾits̻a] or bertsolarism is the art of singing improvised songs in Basque according to various melodies and rhyming patterns. Bertsos can be composed at a variety of occasions but are performed generally by one or various bertsolaris onstage in an event arranged for the purpose or as a sideshow, in homage ceremonies, in benefit lunches and suppers, with friends or at a competition. Such a sung piece of composition is called a bertso, the person who sings it is called a bertsolari and the art of composing bertsos is called bertsolaritza in Basque. Traditionally these were sung by men but there is an increasing number of young female bertsolaris today.

Usually the Basque terms are used in Spanish and French but the Spanish terms versolarismo and bertsolarismo and the French terms bertsularisme (from Zuberoan bertsularitza), bertsolarisme and versification are also used.

== Bertso ==
A bertso consists of two main components: the spontaneous verse and the melody to which it is sung. The famous modern-day bertsolari Xabier Amuriza defined it in a bertso as:

Neurriz eta errimaz
kantatzea itza
orra or zer kirol mota
den bertsolaritza.

Translation:

Through metre and rhyme
to sing the word
that is what kind of sport
the bertsolaritza is.

Many different forms of metre exist for bertsos but 4 of the commonly encountered ones are the zortziko txiki "small of eight", zortziko handi "big of eight", hamarreko txiki "small of ten" and hamarreko handi "big of ten". An example of a Zortziko Txiki is the first stanza of the bertso Aitorren Izkuntz Zarra "Aitor's Ancient Language" by Z. Andonegi:

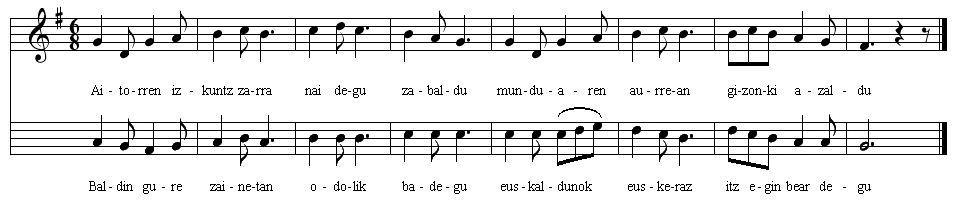
Music for Aitorren Izkuntz Zarra

Aitorren Izkuntz Zarra

Aitorren izkuntz zarra
nai degu zabaldu
munduaren aurrean
gizonki azaldu
baldin gure zainetan
odolik badegu
euskaldunak euskeraz
itz egin bear degu.

Translation:

Aitor's ancient language
we want to spread
in front of the world
courageously present
as long as in our veins
we have blood
we Basques in Basque
must speak.

The zortziko txiki is called the "small of eight" as the first lerro or "line" contains 7 oinak or "syllables" (literally called "feet"), followed by 6 syllables in the next line. Such a pair of lines is called a puntu, a "point", 4 puntu (or 8 lines) in total form one stanza in a zortziko txiki. The rhyme is carried in the lines of 6 syllables. The zortziko handi on the other hand contains 10 syllables in the first line, followed by 8 in the second. The hamarreko txiki and hamarreko handi only differ in the number of lines, of which they have 10 rather than 8.

An error in the rhyme is called a poto.

=== Music ===
There are scores of possible tunes which can be used for singing a bertso, stemming from traditional songs that once caught on and embedded themselves in folk culture. They are all, however, unaccompanied.

=== Occasions and presentation ===
Bertsos can be composed in a variety of settings and manners. The most elaborate forms are usually encountered at a formal bertsolari txapelketa, a "bertsolari competition" where a group of bertsolaris compete against each other for the txapela, the "winner's beret". At a formal competition the bertsolari are called upon to compose and sing different kinds of bertsos by the gai-jartzaile, the "subject setter". The gai-jartzaile informs the bertsolari(s) of the type of challenge, which tune they have to use, and the metre. Some common bertso challenges include:

- Hasierako Agurra "The Initial Greeting": the bertsolari has to address the audience at the start of the day's competition, usually with a free choice of metre and topic
- Gartzelako Lana "Prison Cell Task": the bertsolari has to compose and sing a bertso to a given topic.
- Elkarrizketa "Conversation": two bertsolaris have to deal with the topic together, singing the stanzas in turns and responding to the previous statement. Again the topic is given.
- Puntua Jarrita "Point Given": the jartzaile sings a puntu and the bertsolari has to complete it, staying within the given tune and metre.
- Hitza Emanda "Word Given": the jartzaile gives a key word to the bertsolari who has to compose a bertso containing this word.
- Oinak Emanda "Rhymes Given": the bertsolari is given the four (or more, depending on the metre required) rhyming words and is required to compose the bertso "around" these rhyming words.
- Txapeldunaren Agurra "The Winner's Farewell": here the bertsolari is allowed to compose their farewell to the audience.

=== Topics ===
Any topic can occur in a bertso, anything from world politics to a humorous discussion about sex. Nowadays, the topic most used is politics. Bertsolaris criticize the state they are living on today's society. A bertsolari might for example be asked to pretend to be a 17-year-old girl who has come home at 3 am to realise she has lost her house keys and must ring the doorbell. Bertsolaris may be required to compose an argument between two family members or to look at a topic from a philosophical point of view. The audience and the judges value humor as much as poetic value.

=== Language ===
Bertsos are always sung in Basque. Because it is primarily an oral art form, every bertsolari is free to use his or her own dialect and there is no requirement to use Standard Basque. For this reason the orthography and grammatical forms used in publications of bertsos often diverge from the standard language even today to accommodate for dialect forms. For example, h is silent in Western dialects, so it is generally not written in old bertsos from those dialects, and ll ([ʎ]) and ñ ([ɲ]) are used much more often than in Standard Basque; and ü ([y]) appears in the texts of Souletin bertsos. The use of dialectal forms may ease finding a suitable verse.

For example, the bertso Ürz' aphal bat by Etxahun was composed in his native Souletin dialect. If this was given in modern Standard Basque, it would not only be altered radically but also break the syllable structure of the bertso:

Zuberoan	Standard Basque	Translation
Ürz'aphal bat badügü herrian tristerik	Pagauso bat badugu herrian tristerik	We have a sad woodpigeon at home
Nigarrez ari düzü kaloian barnetik	Negarrez ari da kaiolan barnetik	It is crying from the cage
Bere lagün maitiaz beit' izan ützirik	Bere lagun maiteaz baita izan utzirik	Having been left by its beloved friends
Kuntsola ezazie ziek adiskidik.	Kontsola ezazue zuek adiskideak.	Friends, console it.

== History ==
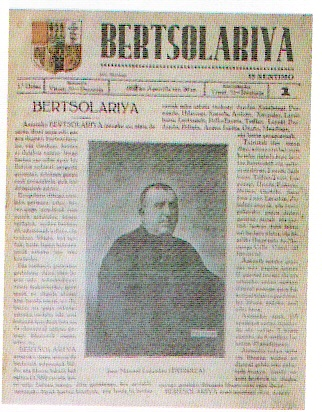
A title page of Bertsolariya, a bertso paper that appeared between 1931 and 1932

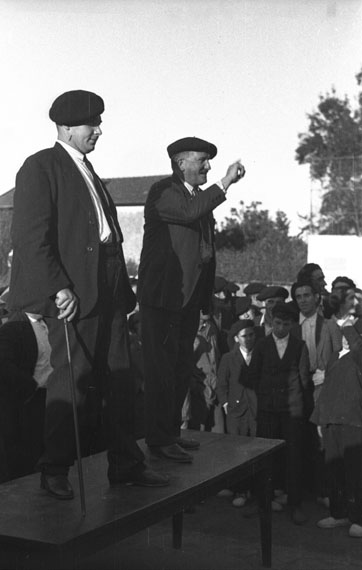
Bertsolaris Larralde and Hiriart performing in Sara, Labourd (1936)

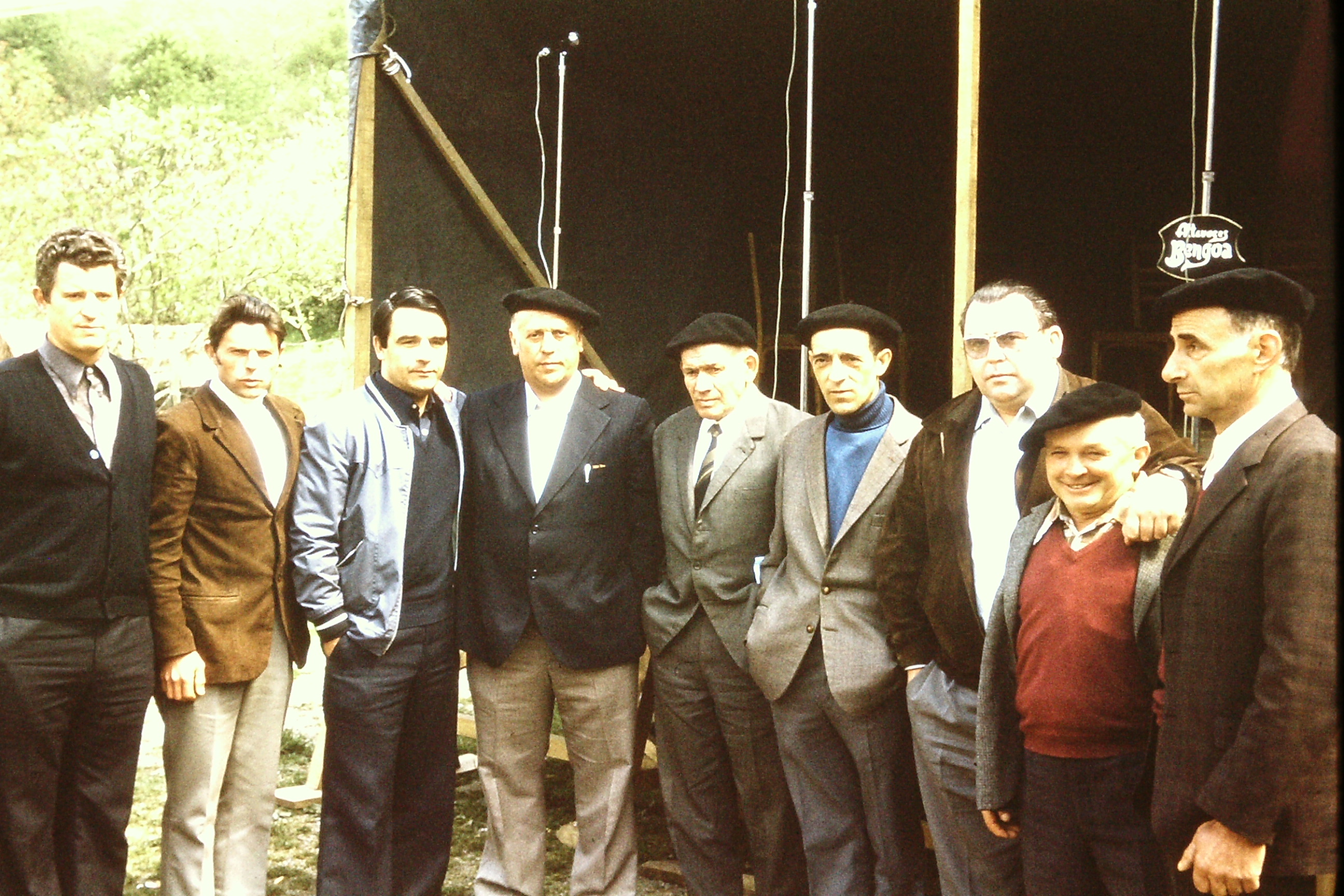
Popular bertsolaris of the mid-1970s

=== Late 18th century onwards ===
There exists evidence of bertso singing and written samples of akin bertso poems ("kopla zaharrak") since the late 15th century, e. g. bertso stories transmitted orally for generations in Soule, attestation of bertso singing in funerary rites of Biscay. It is unclear exactly how old this tradition is but the modern recorded history of bertsolaritza dates back to the beginning of the 19th century. Bertsolaris were for the most part illiterate people, who performed in informal situations. As such, they did not consider themselves as poets or a formal institution. However, they enjoyed great popularity and people often retained from memory their bertsos. Many of the most famous bertsolaris of this period came from the central province of Gipuzkoa. One of the earliest and most famous of these was a man called Fernando Bengoetxea Altuna. He was commonly known as Pernando Amezketarra, "Pernando from Amezketa (a village in Gipuzkoa)" and both a much loved bertsolari and trickster.

Coinciding with a turbulent period in Basque history (the Carlist Wars, World War I and World War II, the Spanish Civil War, Spain under Franco) bertsos were a popular way of reflecting on current issues and events, like in Norteko ferrokarrilla, on railway. Although bertsos which were considered to be worthy of passing on had been passed on orally before, the bertso-paperak, "bertso papers", became popular in this period and are the main source of information on these early bertsos today. They could become an effective means of spreading support for one political position or another during the Carlist Wars, e. g. Muñagorriren bertsoak.

=== Txirrita's period and postwar period ===
In the run-up to the Spanish Civil War, two kinds of bertsolari started to be distinguished, the eskolatuak, the "studied" bertsolaris who were aware of written Basque literature, and the eskolatu gabeak, the "unstudied" bertsolariak who were not as literate, e. g. Txirrita. The former, e. g. Basarri, were encouraged and advocated for by the Basque nationalist theoretician Aitzol, eventually tortured and killed by Spanish nationalist forces in the 1936 military uprising. He was the actual driving force behind the first major championship held in 1935 and the ensuing 1936 edition, while the Spanish Civil War put a halt to the national championships until 1960.

In the wake of the Civil War (1936-1937 in the Basque Country), all advancement on recognition of the bertsolaritza and Basque culture came to an end. Repression and hunger demoted the performances to low-key events, basically in a friend and family environment, since the new Francoist rule regarded this cultural activity with suspicion.

=== Social bertsolaritza ===
As the tight regime opened up in the 1950s, on-stage performances alongside provincial championships started to be held, with the bertsolaritza taking on a higher public profile. In this period, the pairs Lopategi and Azpillaga from the Spanish Basque Country and Mattin and Xalbador from the French Basque Country should be highlighted. In 1967, a controversial national championship took place in San Sebastian, when sadly frictions over the language gap between the eastern (French) and western dialects came to a head (contender Uztapide vs Xalbador).

=== Rise of new bertsolaritza ===
There were no more national championships until 1980, in San Sebastian. This time the celebration meeting of improvised poetry was attended by an audience of some 10,000 people, where a new kind of bertsolari emerged, Xabier Amuriza, one who had methodically re-learnt the Basque language and the way of fashioning bertsos (in prison), as opposed to the previous in-born bertsolaris. New ways of learning the art of singing extemporaneous verses were set up, i.e. schools, resulting in new generations of bertsolaris, such as the young Jon Sarasua, who qualified to the final in the 1986 national championship.

In the 90s, the educated new generations came to the spotlight, with Andoni Egaña from Zarautz bridging the generation gap between the largely rural uneducated or semi-educated bertsolaris from the old school and the new educated urban youths. The new bertsolaris were more technical and able to deal with almost all kind of issues in society, with young girls starting to stand out too. Furthermore, especially in the 2000s, young bertsolaris show a concern in forms and in opening up to new trends, like hip-hop or theatrical performances, instead of staying put on the stage.

Today the championships are conducted both at the provincial level and at the national level. Since having started again, they have drawn increasingly large crowds and the popularity of certain bertsolaris coupled with a renewed effort to foster traditional Basque culture have rejuvenated this tradition since the 80s, while an effort is being made to get close to other international extemporaneous verse traditions and mix different art disciplines. Many young people today have the opportunity to study bertsolaritza as a school subject or attend one of the many bertso schools for adults which today can be found in all 7 provinces of the Basque Country.

On December 13, 2009, the Main or National Contest (Txapelketa Nagusia) held on a 4-year basis took place at the Bilbao Exhibition Centre (BEC), with a massive turnout of 15,000. For the first time in the history of bertsolaritza, a woman, Maialen Lujanbio, won the contest after contending in the finals against the young Amets Arzallus, so taking over the txapela (or winner's beret) from Andoni Egaña, winner of four Main Contests in a row since 1993.

Basque Television routinely broadcasts the championships and has programmes about bertsolaritza such as Hitzetik Hortzera which has been running since 1988.

== Navarre and the French Basque Country ==
Both Navarre and the Northern provinces have begun to participate in the renaissance of the bertsolari tradition but with some conspicuous differences, mainly due to sociolinguistic issues. While Basque in the Autonomous Community enjoys relatively sound position, in the other provinces the transmission and use of Basque is weaker, especially in the North. Here, the bertso tradition almost vanished following the death of the veteran bertsolaris Martin Treku (Mattin) and Fernando Aire (Xalbador) (1981 and 1976) with only a handful of senior bertsolaris staging performances thereafter. In the north of Navarre, bertsolaris were also scarce with some notable exceptions such as Manolo Arozena.

In addition, the tradition in these parts of the Basque Country played down technical aspects of the verse (especially the rhyme), taking on forms closer to extemporaneous song. In the 90s, bertsolaritza began to show a renewed vitality in the north of Navarre thanks to young people keen on the practice, while at the turn of the century concerted efforts were made in the northern provinces aimed at restoring the bertsolaritza tradition by establishing bertso learning as an extracurricular activity in Basque language schools. The new bertsolaris emerging from these schools follow the prevailing bertso manners of the western provinces. The skill of some of these young bertsolaris such as Sustrai Colina or Amets Arzallus (from Labourd) is worth mentioning. The bertso school of Oiartzun, a town with close ties to the bordering areas of Navarre and nearby Labourd has played a major role in the efforts to sustain the bertsolaritza tradition.

== Bertsolaritza in the community and competitions ==
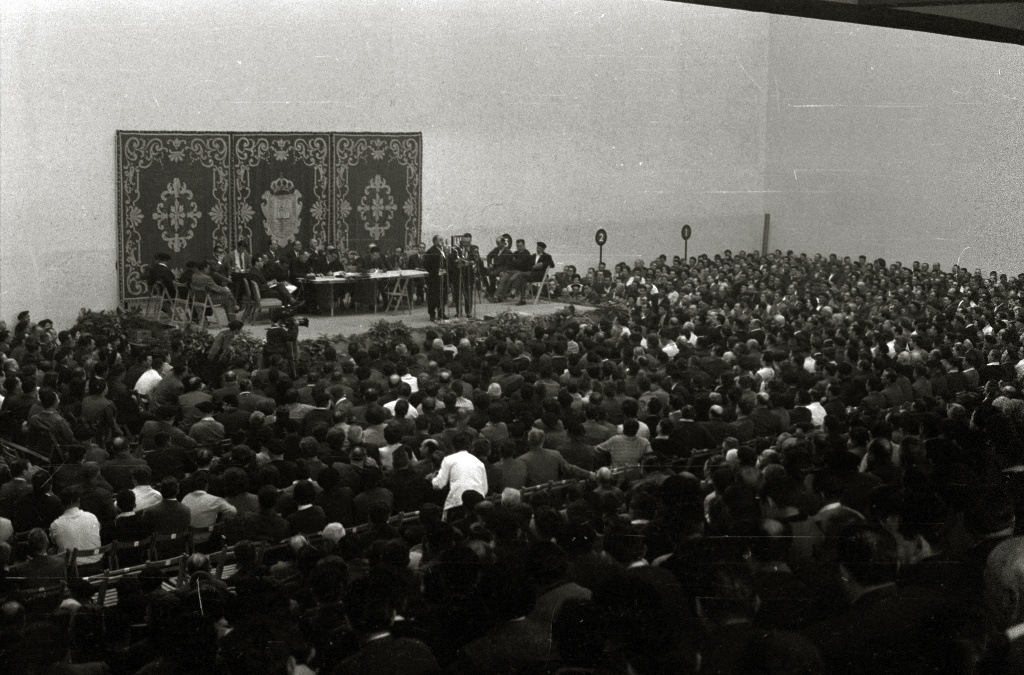
1967 Bertso Contest in Donostia

Bertsolaritza is practised both formally at competitions and informally at a wide variety of occasions, for example when visiting a Basque cider house, to give voice to a particular emotion or to settle a debate.

More formal competitions are often held at occasions such as town festivals or fairs. The most important over-regional competitions are the

- Arabako Bertsolari Txapelketa in Álava
- Bizkaiko Bertsolari Txapelketa in Biscay
- Gipuzkoako Bertsolari Txapelketa in Gipuzkoa
- Nafarroako Bertsolari Txapelketa in Navarre
- Iparraldeko Bertsolari Txapelketa in the Northern Basque Country

=== The Txapelketa Nagusia ===
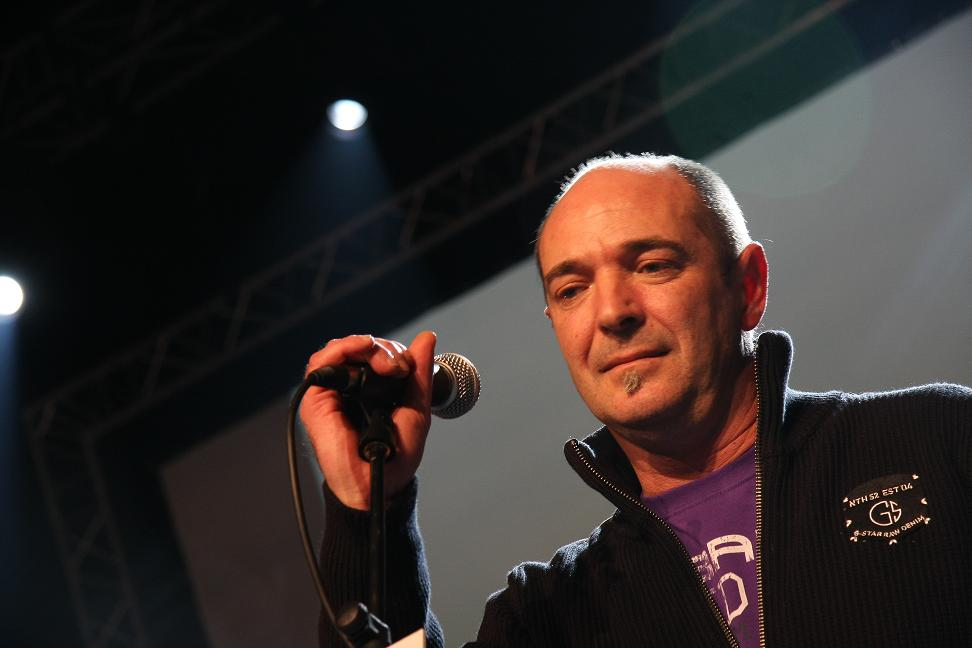
Andoni Egaña won the Bertsolari Txapelketa Nagusia four times in a row.

Above the provincial level, there is the Euskal Herriko Bertsolari Txapelketa Nagusia or "Great Bertsolari Championship of the Basque Country." This has been held (with considerable gaps due to the Second World War and the Spanish Civil War) since 1935 and involves local and regional heats prior to the finale.

==== Maialen Lujanbio ====
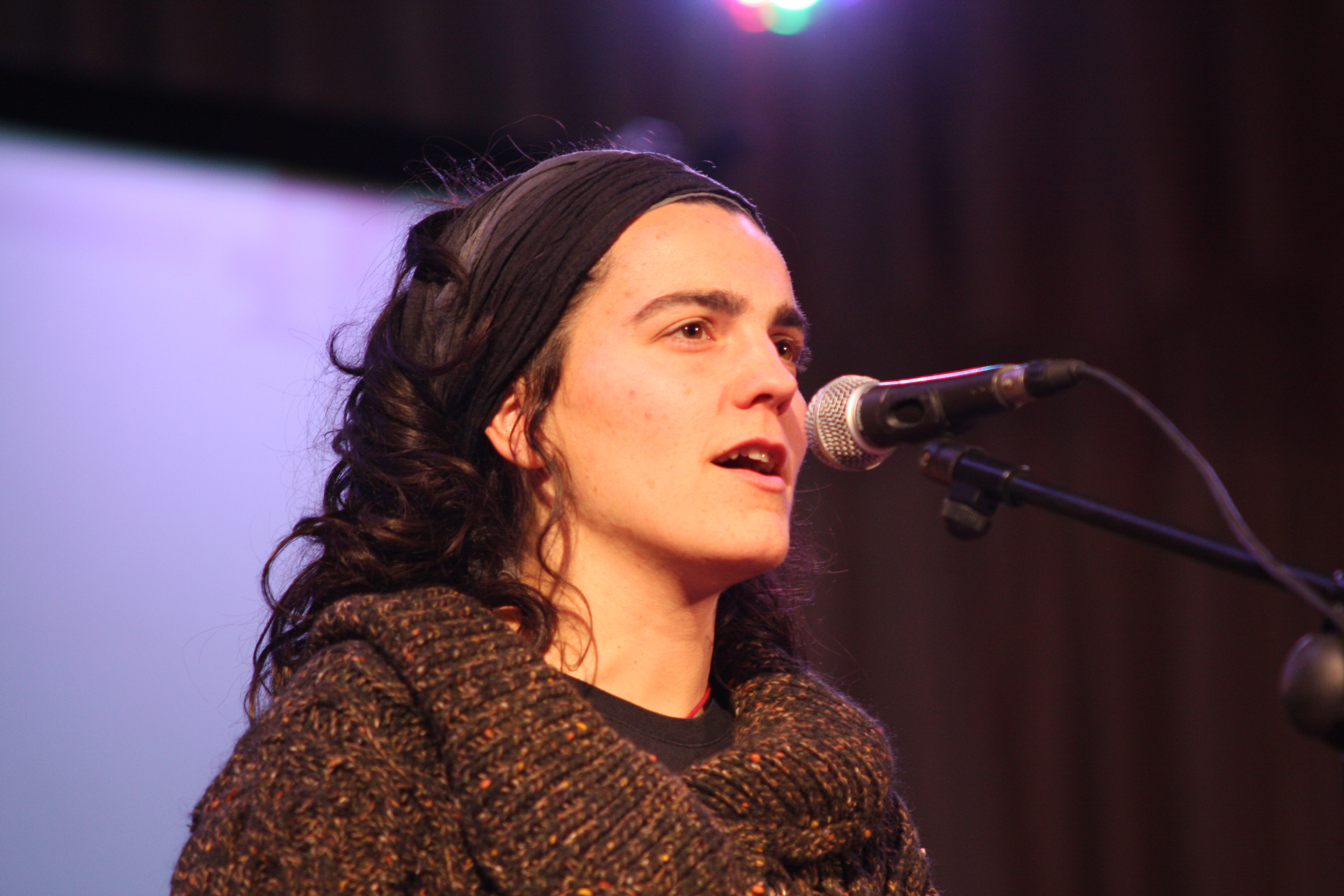
Maialen Lujanbio in 2008.

Maialen Lujanbio's composing a bertso at the 2009 Txapelketa Nagusi.

In 2009, Maialen Lujanbio Zugasti became the first woman to win the championship. Her solo challenge was as follows: Maialen, you are a doctor. You're observing two children suffering from cancer organising a wheelchair race in a hospital corridor, leading to the following bertso:

Zabal-zabalik geratzen zaizkit nere begi nere aho.
Hospital hontan sartu zirala, denbora joan da luzaro:
abuztu, irail eta urria bihurtu zaie azaro,
ta zai-zai daude noiz irtengo edo noiz aginduko “akabo!”.
Elkarri nola deitzen dioten “burusoiltxo!” Eta “kalbo”,
minbizi duten bi umeeri begira-begira nago.
Eurengan minak badu indarra, baina bizitzak gehiago.

Egiten dute irrifar eta begitan dute dizdira
etsitzen dute nahiz ta lagunak eta eskola desira.
Denborarako egin zieten laguntxoei despedida
eta orain biak hemen dabiltza juerga, salto, buelta, biba.
Tututxo batek lotuta dauzka oxigenoan harira
baina kontentu ta lasai daude jolas hoietan argi da
ta maitasuna behar dutenak euren gurasoak.

Aita ta ama hor ikusten ditut ta nola ez konprenitu?
Esperantzazko eskatzen dute arren zerbait zirrikitu.
Euren aurrean negar ein nahi ez ta barrun ezin kabitu
urruntzen dira umeengandik ta orduan begiak blaitu.
Nik gurasoei esaten diet «Jarraitu! Gogor jarraitu!
Zuen umeak indartsu dira hemen ez da deus amaitu
ze bizitzeko gogoa dunak bizitzea lortzen baitu

Translation:

I am left mouth agape and with eyes wide
you have been in this hospital for a long time
August, September and October have turned into November,
and them wondering when it's time to leave or call an end
Calling each other "baldie" and "baldielocks",
I am looking after two children with cancer.
Strong is their cancer, but stronger so their life.

With a giggle and a twinkle in their eyes
Though missing their friends and school.
They bade farewell to their little friends for the time being
and here they are having a ball, jumping and turning with a yippie aye yay.
A small tube connecting them to their oxygen
but clearly they are content and calm in their games
and it is clear it is their parents who need love.

I see their mother and father and how could I not understand?
In hope they beg for a glimmer of hope.
Not wanting to cry in front of them and unable to control their tears
they move away from the children and then their eyes turn wet.
I tell the parents "Keep going! Don't give up!
Your children are strong, thise is not the end
for those who have the will to live will live.

In 2017 and 2022 she won the contest for a second and third time, becoming the only woman to have won it thrice.

== Famous Bertsolaris ==
Most historic bertsolaris were generally known by their nickname, usually stemming from the family house or farm, not their given name (given in brackets).

=== Historic Bertsolaris ===
- Basarri (Inazio Eizmendi, 1913–1999) Gipuzkoa
- Bilintx (Indalezio Bizkarrondo, 1831–1876) Gipuzkoa
- Bordel (Joan Etxamendi Larralde, 1792–1879) Navarre
- Etxahun (Pierre Topet, 1786–1862) Soule
- Etxahun-Iruri (Pierre Bordazarra, 1908–79) Soule
- Etxamendi (Jean Etxamendi 1873-1962) Lower Navarre
- Lexoti (Jose Luis Lekuona (1925–2006) Gipuzkoa
- Lazkao Txiki (Joxe Migel Iztueta Kortajarena, 1926–1993) Gipuzkoa
- Mattin (Mattin Treku Inhargue, 1916–1981) Labourd
- Otaño (Pello Mari Otaño Barriola, 1857–1910) Gipuzkoa
- Pello Errota (Pedro Jose Elizegi, 1840–1919) Gipuzkoa
- Pernando Amezketarra (Fernando Bengoetxea Altuna, 1764–1823) Gipuzkoa
- Piarres Ibarrart (1838–1919) Labourd
- Txirrita (Jose Manuel Lujanbio Erretegi, 1860–1936) Gipuzkoa
- Urretxindorra (Kepa Enbeita Renteria, 1878–1942) Biscay
- Uztapide (Manuel Olaizola Urbieta, 1909–1983) Gipuzkoa
- Xalbador (Ferdinand Aire Etxart, 1920–1976) Lower Navarre
- Xanpun (Manuel Sein, 1928–2002) Labourd
- Xenpelar (Frantzisko Petrirena Errekondo, 1835–1869) Gipuzkoa
- Zepai (Akilino Izagirre Amenabar, 1906–1971) Gipuzkoa

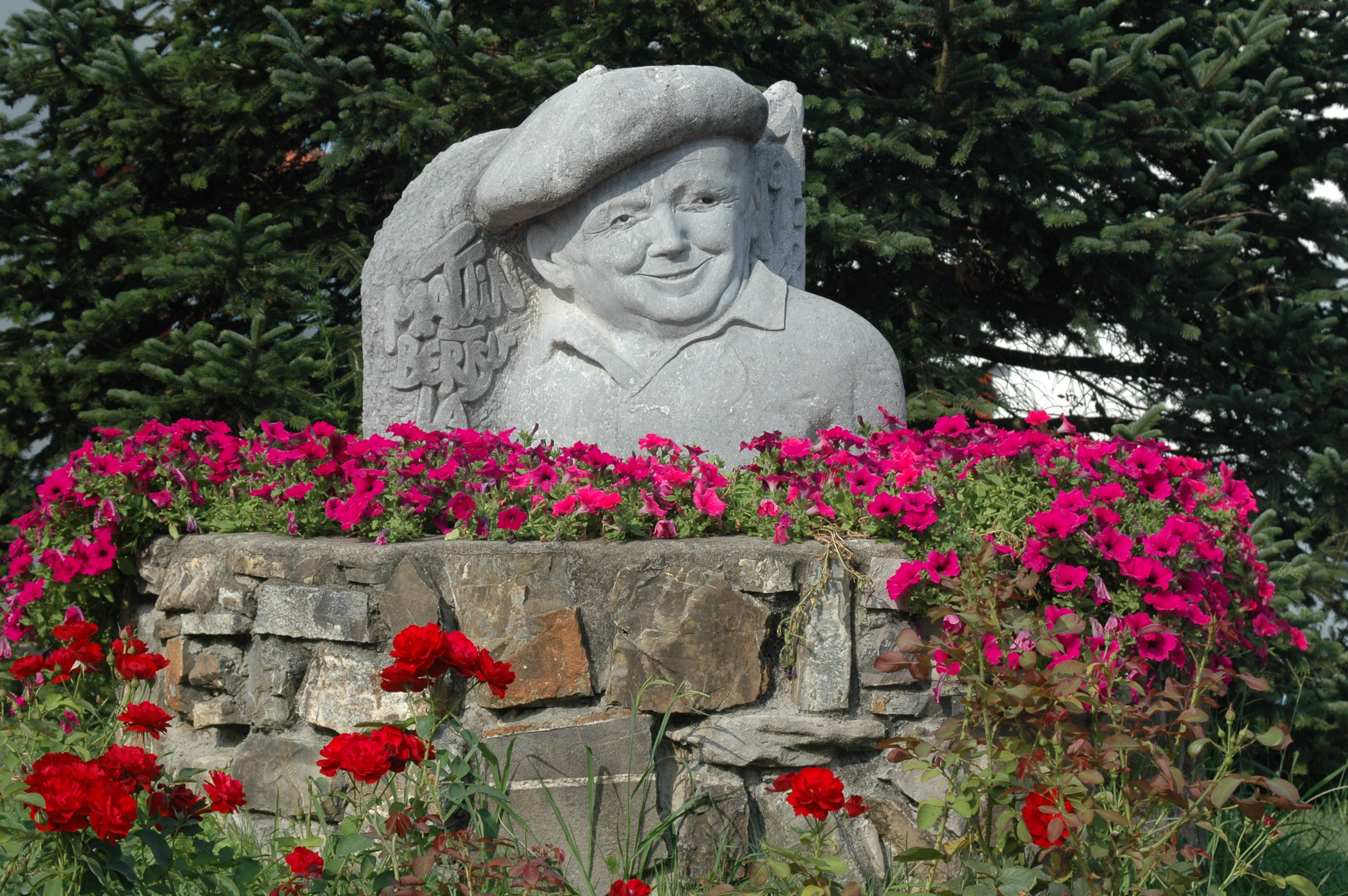
A statue of Mattin Treku in Ahetze

=== Modern Bertsolaris ===
- Uxue Alberdi (born 1984) Gipuzkoa
- Miren Amuriza (born 1990) Biscay
- Xabier Amuriza Sarrionandia (1941) Biscay
- Amets Arzallus Antia (1983) Labourd
- Sustrai Colina Akordarrementeria (1983) Labourd
- Andoni Egaña Makazaga (1961) Gipuzkoa
- Igor Elortza Aranoa (1975) Biscay
- Jon Embeita Ealo (1950) Biscay
- Unai Iturriaga Zugaza-Artaza (1974) Biscay
- Maialen Lujanbio Zugasti (1976) Gipuzkoa
- Jon Maia Soria (1972) Gipuzkoa
- Jon Martin Etxebeste (1981) Gipuzkoa
- Mañukorta (Gregorio Larrañaga Mandiola, 1943) Biscay
- Oihane Perea Perez de Mendiola (1977) Álava
- Xabier Silveira Etxeberria (1976) Navarre
- Aitor Usandizaga Izagirre (1976) Lower Navarre

== Similar traditions ==
Other cultures have traditions of sung extemporary verse not unlike bertsolaritza. Amongst them are the Austro-Bavarian Gstanzl, the Galician regueifa, the Italian improvvisatori, and the Sardinian mutos (also known as mutettus, repentina or ottada in different parts of the island.

Modernly bertsolaris have established contact with the Spanish-language traditions of Argentinian payadores and Cuban décimas. The Basque band Negu Gorriak experimented with bertso-hop, drawing from bertso and rap music.

== See also ==
- 16th-century Basque literature
