= Tribute of the Three Cows =

Annual ceremony on the France–Spain border

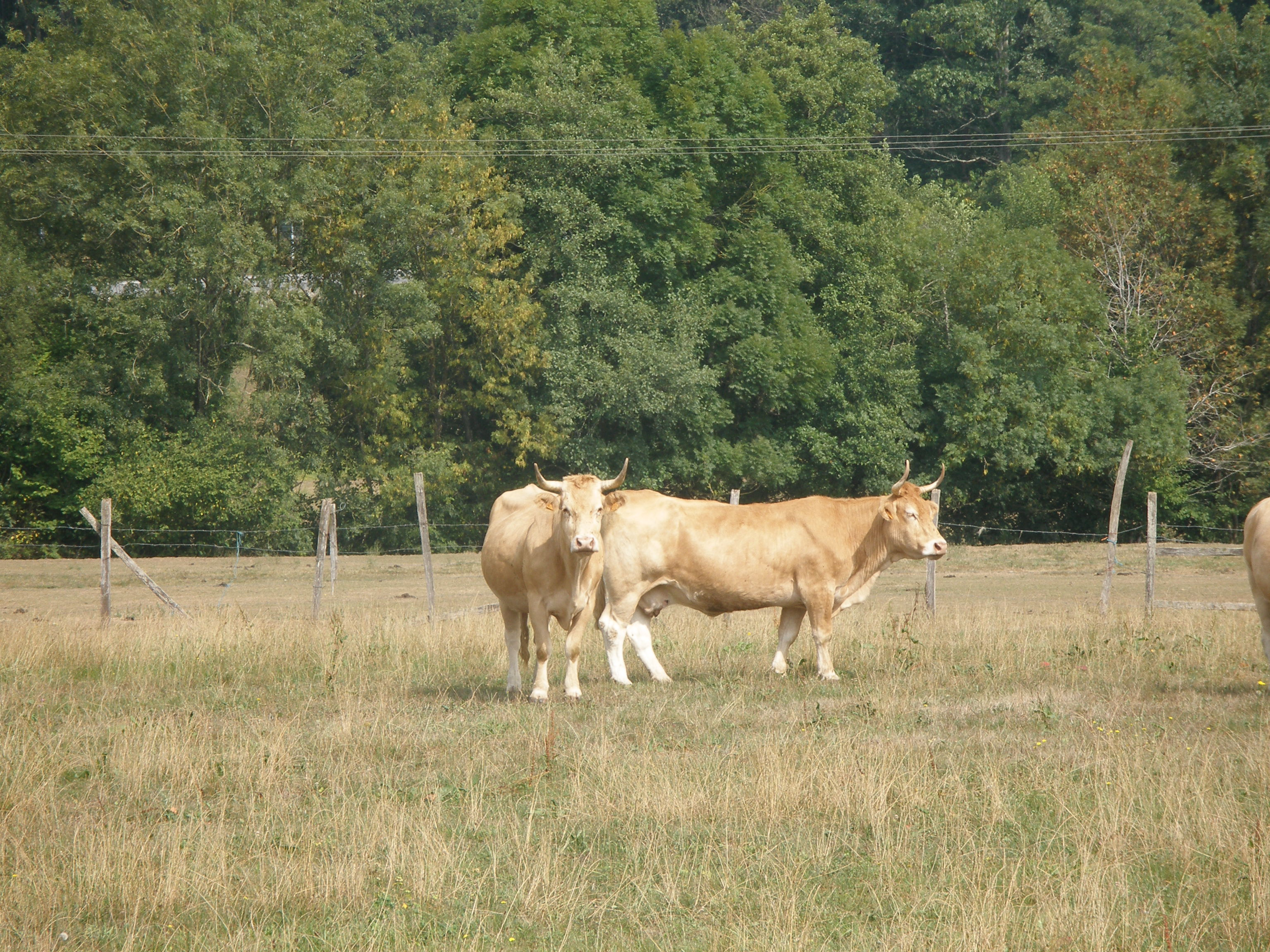
- The cows with which the tribute is paid belong to the Pirenaica breed.
- Native name: Tributo de las Tres Vacas (Spanish) or Junte de Roncal (French)
- English name: Tribute of the Three Cows
- Date: 13 July
- Location: Col de la Pierre St Martin, border between Spain and France
- Type: Ceremony
- Cause: Border disputes over grazing grounds in the 13th and 14th century.
- Organised by: Valleys of Roncal and Barétous

The Tribute of the Three Cows is a yearly ceremony that gathers together the people of the neighbouring Pyrenean valleys of the Barétous Valley (in Béarn, France) and the Roncal Valley (in Navarre, Spain). The ceremony takes place every 13 July on the summit of the Col de la Pierre St Martin near the site of the St. Martin's Stone, which traditionally demarcates the border between the towns of Roncal and Barétous. There, the people of Barétous hand over three cows to the people of Roncal, as a peace tribute that has been paid yearly since at least 1375.

The Tribute of the Three Cows is sometimes regarded as the oldest international treaty still enforced. Its exact origin is unknown, but documented evidence shows that it long predates the 1375 legal arbitration that established its current format. In fact, the war treaty after the invasion of Cimbri and Barétounais in 125 is thought to have been the start of this tribute.

Although it is traditionally referred to as a tribute, the payment of the three cows is a synallagmatic contract between equals. It was established through the mediation of a third party, the people of Ansó. The arbitration decision was issued in Ansó (Aragón, currently located in Spain) on 16 October 1375. Official records of its celebration date back to at least 1575. Records certifying its celebration before 1575 have not survived. The ceremony has since occurred almost every year, having been suspended only twice. The first suspension occurred in 1793 during the War of the Convention between France and Spain. The second suspension occurred in 1940 during the Nazi occupation of France. In both cases, the people of Barétous were prevented by regional authorities from attending the ceremony out of fear they would escape to Spain.

The ceremony attracts many tourists and is regarded as intangible cultural heritage by the government of Navarre.

== Ceremony ==
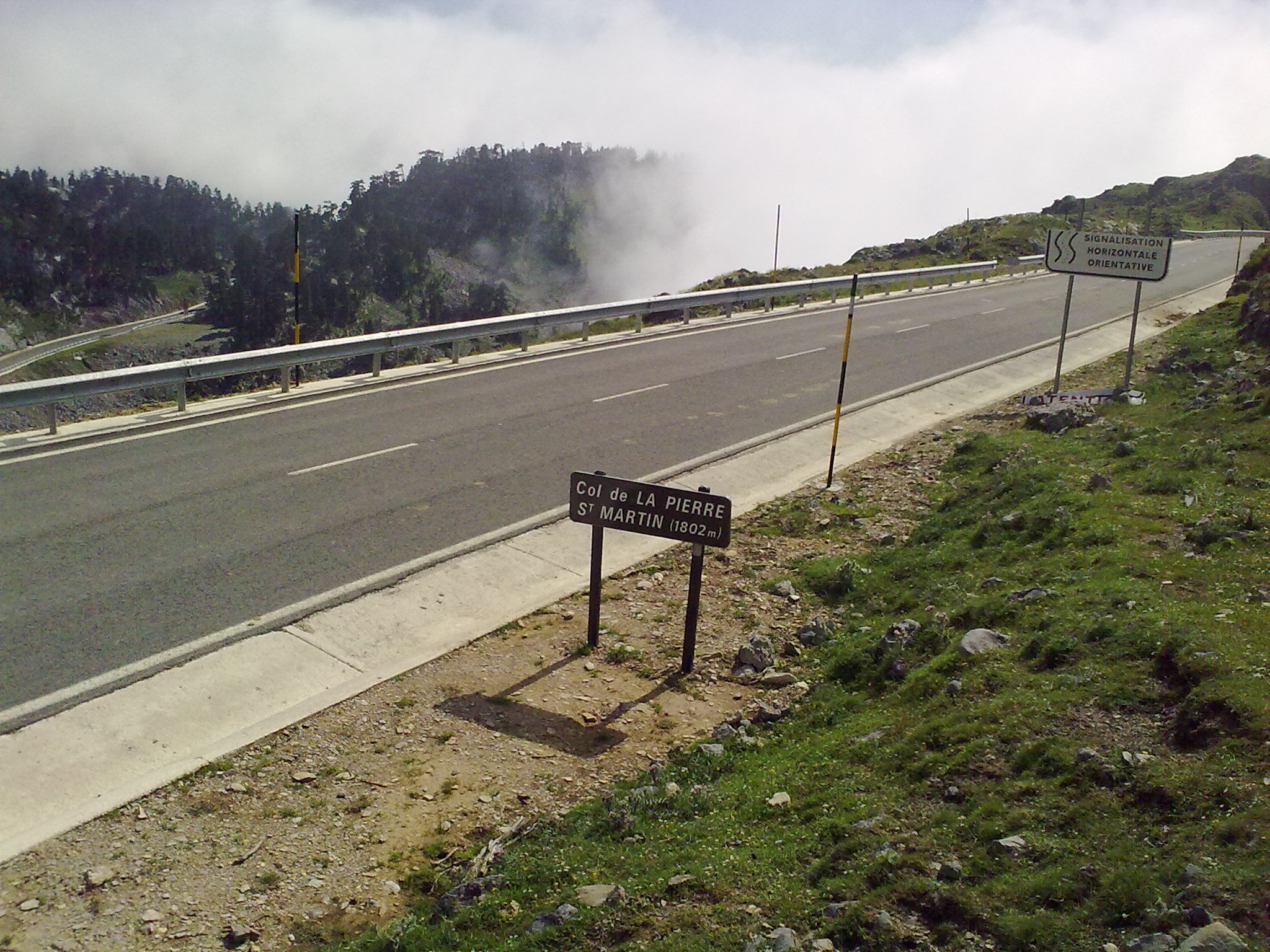
Mountain pass of the pierre de St Martin, where the ceremony takes place.

The ceremony involves a group of representatives from Barétous and Roncal, typically the mayors of the towns and villages of Isaba, Uztárroz, Urzainqui, and Garde representing the valley of Roncal, and the mayors of Ance, Aramits, Arette, Féas, Issor, and Lanne-en-Barétous representing the valley of Barétous.

At about 10 o'clock in the morning of July 13, the representatives of Roncal — wearing their traditional garment consisting of a short black cloak, doublet, breeches, broad linen collar, and a hat — gather on the Spanish side of boundary marker no.262, which substitutes for the traditional St. Martin's Stone (lost since 1858). The boundary marker is at the summit of the Col de la Pierre St Martin, 1,721 m (5,646 ft) high. The representatives of Barétous, dressed in Sunday clothes and holding the tricolor French flag, approach the boundary marker from the French side. Traditionally, the mayor of Isaba would hold a pike against the Barétous representatives, and these would also be held at gunpoint by the rest of the representatives of Roncal; this custom was dropped in the late 19th century.

The mayor of Isaba, presiding over the ceremony, asks the Barétous representatives three times, in Spanish, whether they are willing, as in previous years, to pay the Tribute of the Three Cows of two years of age, of the same coat and with the same sort of horns, and without blemish or injury. Each time the Barétous representatives answer in Spanish, "Sí, señor" [Yes, sir].

Following this, one of the representatives of Barétous places his or her right hand on the boundary marker; a representative from Roncal follows by placing his or hers on top of it, and so on, until all representatives have placed their right hands on the boundary marker. The last one to place his hand is the mayor of Isaba, who then utters the following words:

Pax avant, pax avant, pax avant
Let there be peace!

All those witnessing the ceremony repeat the same words. The representatives of Roncal are then presented with the three cows, which are then examined by the veterinarian of Isaba, who must certify that the cows are healthy. Afterward, the cows are divided amongst the towns and villages of the valley of Roncal: two cows are given to the city of Isaba, whilst the other one is given in alternating fashion to the villages of Uztarroz, Urzainqui, and Garde.

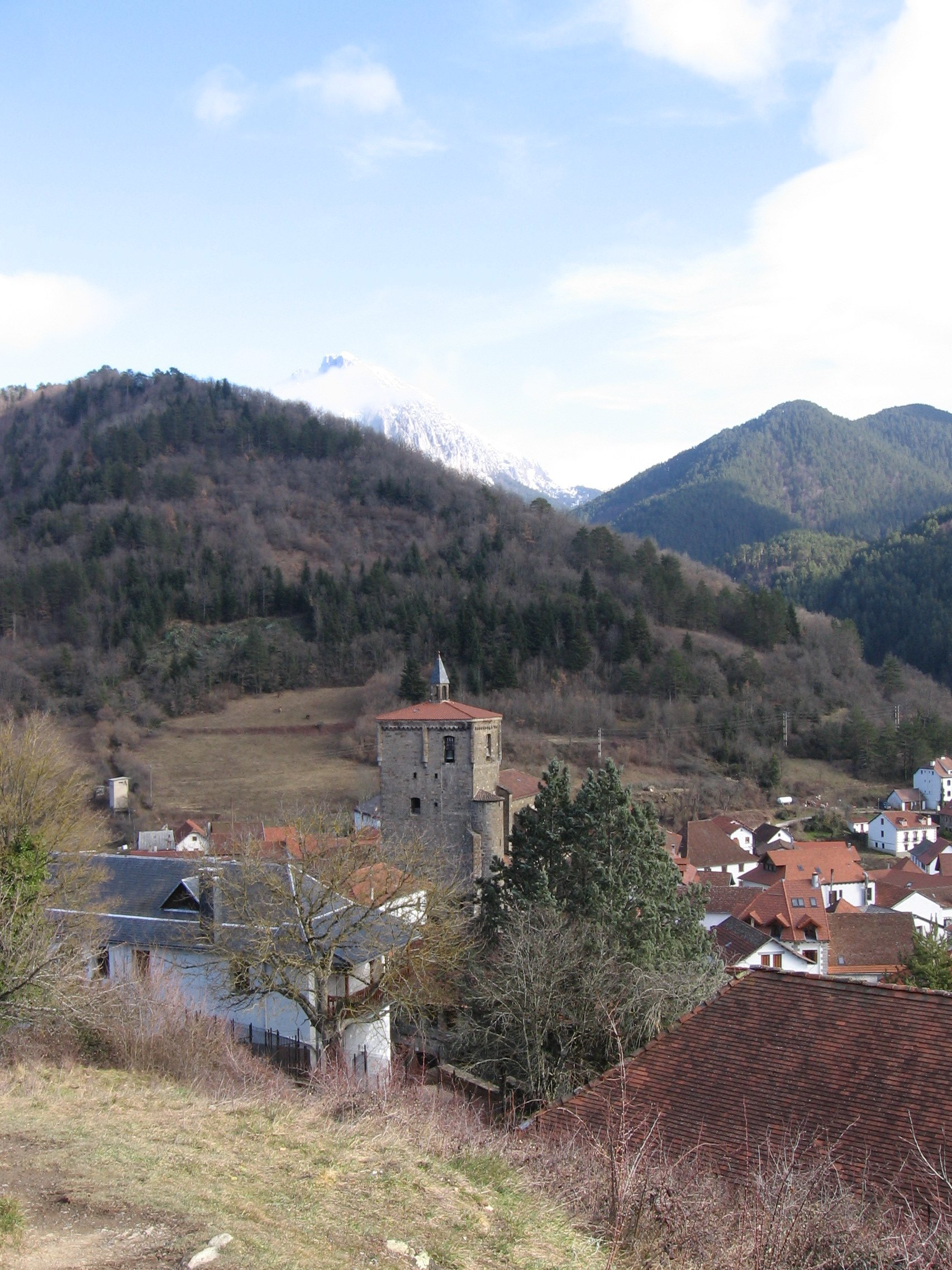
The town of Isaba. The mayor of Isaba presides over the Tribute of the Three Cows.

Following that, the mayor of Isaba hands over a receipt to the representatives of Barétous, and proceeds to name four guards for the passeries (the communal pastures established by the treaty) of Ernaz and Leja, who are then sworn over. He then asks any persons having any objections to step forward and declare them.

Once the ceremony is over, the minutes of the ceremony are readied by the secretary, and they are certified and signed by the representatives of Roncal and Barétous. Guests of honour usually sign the minutes as witnesses. Afterward, everyone gathers to share a communal meal where they eat stewed lamb.

Owing to the 1990s mad cow disease scandal, Spain and France banned mutual exports of non-quarantined cattle, so nowadays, the cows involved in the tribute are returned to Barétous after the ceremony, and the tribute is paid in money instead, amounting to the value of three cows.

== History ==
The valley of Roncal is the easternmost valley of the Navarrese Pyrenees, whilst the valley of Barétous is the first Pyrenean valley of Béarn. Historically, Roncal belonged to the kingdom of Navarre, which held territory both on the southern side of the Pyrenees (centred around Pamplona) and on the northern mountainside, including the provinces of Lower Navarre and Soule in modern France. The Béarn polity, albeit nominally under the sovereignty of the Duchy of Gascony (for a long time in the High Middle Ages under the control of the Kingdom of England), had acquired a de facto independent status, and was governed by the Viscounts of Béarn.

The Tribute of the Three Cows arises from boundary disputes over the high pastures of Navarre and Béarn. The origin of these disputes is unknown, but evidence of them can be found in documents dating back to the 13th century. The disputes were usually resolved by oral agreement, and sometimes via peace letters or the establishment of passeries (communal grazing grounds).

In the 14th century, the count of Foix, Gaston Fébus, acquired control over Béarn, and in 1374 he refused to acknowledge the sovereignty of France or England over it. In the following decades, the kings of France and England tried successively and in vain to assert their sovereignty over Béarn, whilst the counts of Foix remained largely independent. At the same time, on the death of Joan I of Navarre in 1305, the kingdom of Navarre passed to her son Louis X of France, whereby the crowns of Navarre and France fell under a personal union of the French monarchy, the main threat to the counts of Foix and viscounts of Béarn. Thus, it was at a time when the relationship between Navarre and Béarn was deteriorating that the border dispute between Roncal and Barétous arose.

During the 14th century, the disputes over grazing grounds escalated. While some form of the compact was in place where cows were paid by Baretous to Roncal to maintain the peace, the fights and brawls amongst shepherds of the valleys became increasingly violent. The most notorious of these fights was the so-called Battle of Beotivar of 1321, in which the governor of Navarre and two merinos (military governors) intervened, resulting in the death of one of the merinos and twelve other people. A similar incident occurred in 1335, and 35 people died then.

These altercations led to the drafting of a memorial in 1350, during the reign of Charles IV of France (who had inherited the crown of Navarre as well), that enumerated border disputes throughout the kingdom of Navarre. The document explains that the quarrels arise mainly over the use of water sources in the mountain passes between Roncal and Barétous. A mention is made in it that both the Viscount of Béarn and the King had tried to settle the disputes peacefully:

han paz, amiztat et bonos deudos, sin dicensión alguna, saluo que las gentes de Val de Roncal et las gentes de Val de Baretous, de la tierra de Bearn, han debat sobre labeurador de ciertas fuentes que son en los puertos, en el quoal debat los comisarios de ambas tierras ficieron ciertas providencias, segunt por el proceso paresce.

they are in peace, friendship, and reasonable terms, without exception, except for the people of the valley of Roncal and the people of the valley of Baretous, in the land of Bearn, who have quarreled over certain water springs in the mountain passes, which the commissaries of both realms tried to settle.

In a second document dating 1361, the lieutenant of the merino of Sangüesa mentions the dispute and that the king of Navarre ought to assert his rightful claim over certain mountain passes that the people of Baretous were trying to take over:

en razón de ciertos yermos, los quoales, dichos suplicantes dicen ser de dicho Seynor Rey, et por se efforzar et defender aqueillos, los dichos baratones los persiguen de cada día en personas et en bienes et los encalzan continuadament, en manera que biven en gran periglo.

in relation to certain lands, that those petitioners say belong to the Lord King, and that upon trying to defend the lands, the said Baretous chase them away every day, in such a way that they live in continuous danger.

In this case, Charles IV ordered the lieutenant to move troops to Isaba to ensure peace and that the mountain passes that were rightfully Navarrese remained so:

so pena de cuerpos et bienes, cada que serán requeridos por los dichos de Isava, bayan en ayuda deyllos apeyllidamente, en detenimiento de la tierra del Seynnor Rey, no atendiendo padre a fijo ni fijo a padre.

under penalty of death and seizure, as many as they are required by the people of Isaba will be drafted presently to their aid, from the lands of the Lord King, excluding the father when the son goes and the son when the father goes.

Throughout these years, several failed attempts at reconciliation were made, mediated by the Aragonese town of Ansó, and the bishops of Bayonne, Oloron, Pamplona, and Jaca.

=== Events of 1373 ===
Coat of arms of the valley of Roncal. Several villages in this valley are the beneficiaries of the tribute.

The conflict escalated further until 1373 when the legendary events leading to the arbitration of Ansó of 1375 took place.

The accounts say that in 1373 two shepherds, Pedro Karrika from Isaba and Pierre Sansoler from Arette, met with their flocks on the mountain Arlas, on what officially was the territory of the kingdom of Navarre. After an argument, they quarreled, and Karrika killed Sansoler. The cousin of Sansoler, Anginar Sansoler, gathered together a band of people from Barétous, and tried to track down Karrika. When they failed to find Karrika on the highlands, they descended towards Belagua in Roncal, where they found Karrika's wife, Antonia Garde, then pregnant. After asking her about the whereabouts of her husband, the band killed her. News of her death reached the town of Isaba, where Karrika and others formed an opposing group that set out to avenge her death. They arrived in Sansoler's house whilst the latter was celebrating the murder. The people of Isaba slaughtered everyone present except for Sansoler's wife and baby son, who were spared. Upon hearing of this killing, the people of Arette retaliated by ambushing Karrika and his band, who were then killed in a fight were a total of 25 people died. Legend has it that the people of Barétous were led by a terrifying cagot with four ears. However, Lucas Lopéz de Garde of Roncal managed to slay the cagot captain, and the rest of the group from Barétous fled the fight demoralised. News of the events reached the king of Navarre and the viscount of Béarn, who tried in vain to settle the dispute.

The dispute grew in strength until the so-called battle of Aguincea, were 53 Roncalese and 200 Baretouses died. In the end, the Barétous asked for a truce, and the Roncalese agreed for the dispute to be settled by arbitration in Ansó, a nearby town in the then independent kingdom of Aragon.

=== The arbitration of Ansó (1375) ===
The town of Ansó examined the causes of the dispute and on 16 October 1375, issued an arbitration that stands to this day. In the preamble, the arbitration states that the mayor of Ansó, Sancho García and five other residents of Ansó (árbitros arbitradores and amigables componedores, "arbitrating judges" and "amicable mediators") have heard the arguments of the representatives of Roncal and Barétous with the respective permission of the king of Navarre, Charles IV, and the viscount Béarn, Gaston Fébus. The residents of the valley of Soule are also mentioned as arbiters in the dispute. Many hombres buenos ("good men", respected local men) from the interested parties and from other locations were also present.

They met from 28 July to 18 August at the church of Sant Per or Saint Peter. After hearing witnesses and examining documents, they were seated in the manner of judges, and their purpose was expressed as follows:

...for the sake of peace and concord and to remove hatreds, resentments, ill will, damages, labours, expenses, interests, injuries, deaths, wounds, blows, fights, quarrels, raids, wars, and disputes between the said parties.

The arbitrators acknowledged the failure of earlier attempts at reconciliation in which bishops, knights and commissioners of the king of Navarre and the count of Foix had intervened. The arbitration details the work done by the mayor of Ansó and the rest of the arbiters to settle the dispute. They examined witnesses and relevant documents, and travelled to the disputed border. Their first action was to climb to the pass of Arlas, a formidable viewpoint at 2,062 metres above sea level, in order to fix the boundary markers in the presence of five men from each valley. They settled the border between Roncal and Barétous on the so-called rock of Saint Martin, between Isaba and Aramits. The springs and boundary lines where the disagreements were located were examined. Water sources were listed, and a detailed division of the usage of the latter by the flocks from Arette was established. It establishes that the high pastures and water sources lie in Navarrese territory, but the Barétous were granted right of grazing from 10 July to 8 September, and the people of Roncal thereafter until Christmas. From there the remaining passes and ridges were delimited. The ruling continues by regulating the use of pastures by the people of Arette, whose herds of large and small livestock would enter on 10 July and remain for 28 days in order to water at the springs of those sites. After that, the Roncalese herds would graze until Christmas Day. The water could be used freely for drinking or for kneading bread.

For transgressors, severe penalties of carneramiento (seizure of livestock) were established (the carneadores, those responsible for seizing livestock found outside the law, were then appointed for ten years, four from Isaba and four from Arette). Harsh fines were established for any transgression, involving seizure of lands and cattle, and a 300 sous fine for anyone that called to arms. If the offender could not pay the fine, the town would do so.

The sentence also ordered mutual pardon for the deaths that had occurred in both valleys, releasing the Baretous people from the delivery of the cows they owed. The prisoners they held from the opposite valley, two in each, were to be placed at the disposal of the arbitrators. The arbitrators also imposed a truce for ciento et un aynnos (101 years), that is, effectively perpetual.

The arbitration establishes that perhaps in compensation for the deaths and harm caused by Barétous against Roncal, or perhaps for the usage of the water sources, each year Barétous must pay three cows to the people of Isaba, Uztarroz, Garde, and Urzainqui. Thus the tribute of the three cows was established. Regarding the delivery of the cows, it states:

Because we truly find, from the said depositions and the statements of the witnesses and trustworthy persons, that the people of Baretous have always used and been accustomed to give three cows every two years, without blemish, on the fourth day after the feast of the Seven Brothers, for each year to the people of Isaba, Uztarroz-Goyena, Garde and Urzainqui in their territory. Some witnesses say this was because of the killings that the said Baretous people had carried out against those of Isaba, Uztarroz-Goyena, Garde and Urzainqui in their lands; other witnesses say it was because they might take water and water their animals at the said springs... we pronounce and order by sentence that the said Baretous people shall give and pay each year perpetually, from this time forward, the said three cows every two years without blemish... at the said Stone of Saint Martin... And because of the great evils that have passed between them, they shall not be obliged to pay anything up to the present day, but from now onward, as we have declared and judged.

The word "tribute" does not appear in this sentence, although it is applied to all public impositions and to taxes arising from vassalage. This term would be used later, although it is not strictly appropriate because it was a synallagmatic contract, that is, an agreement between two parties on equal terms, without vassalage and with mutual obligations. Some historians believe that in the 14th century, the delivery of three head of cattle had nothing degrading about it and was of little monetary value, almost symbolic, considering the great benefit represented by the use and enjoyment of the pastures and water.

Scholars tend to agree that although seemingly starting as compensation over the conflict, the tribute quickly evolved into a payment in kind for the Barétous to be allowed the use of grazing grounds and water sources in Roncalese territory; it also contributed to strengthening the bonds between the two valleys, and to keeping the peace amongst shepherds and cattle ranchers on either side of the Pyrenees.

The arbitration has thereafter been ratified numerous times, including in the Peace of the Pyrenees and in the Treaty of Bayonne of 1856 between Spain and France, which settled the current border between France and Spain.

== Subsequent history ==
The carta de paz (peace treaty) of 1375 succeeded in pacifying the relationships between both valleys, although in 1389 amendments had to be added to specify issues related to the breeding of cattle. Thereafter, the relationship between Roncal and Barétous became essentially friendly.

On 27 September 1427, a fire destroyed the town of Isaba, including the church that hosted the original treaty, and records of the ceremonies that had taken place thereto. Copies were issued in 1433 to substitute for the destroyed originals.

In 1450, another crisis is recorded, involving the seizure of some five thousand head of livestock by the Roncalese and a similar response from the Baretous people.

The first extant record of the ceremony of 13 July dates to 1477:

Et así bien prestaron et dieron, conforme a la dicha sentencia, las tres vacas a los de la val de Roncal et juraron la dicha paz.

And thus they provided, according to the said sentence, the three cows to the people of Roncal, and swore the peace.

The monarchs of Navarre and the viscounts of Béarn enforced and ratified the arbitration. In 1483, with the marriage of Catherine of Foix to John III of Navarre, the sovereignty of both territories fell under the personal union of the Navarrese monarchy until 1512, which strengthened the links between both valleys. That year, Ferdinand II of Aragon invaded Navarre, and after an extended war, the valley of Roncal fell under Aragonese sovereignty, whilst Béarn remained under the control of the remnants of Navarre. Despite this, Ferdinand II chose to ratify the arbitration.

In 1571, chronicler Esteban de Garibay recorded the first complete description of the ceremony (which remains largely unchanged), although with some errors: it wrongly states that on 13 "June" (instead of July) the famous annual assembly took place, attended by the jurors of the seven villages of Roncal and seven or eight "Breton" jurors (instead of Baretous). The two groups stand on either side of a stone boundary marker a vara and a half high, and the Roncalese ask the "French" (instead of Béarnais, then under Jeanne III as queen of Navarre and viscountess of Béarn) whether they are prepared to swear the oath. They then place their spear on the ground, following the line of the boundary stones, and immediately afterward the Roncalese lay theirs on top, forming a cross. The "French" place their hands on this cross, and the Roncalese, as the superior party, do the same above theirs, with the greatest silence within each jurisdiction. They swear the oath and declare "that the peace between them will go avant, which is the same as saying forward, and it means the same in the Portuguese language". The formula is repeated three times, and then about thirty men emerge from a forest with the cows, held by the horns and tails, of the proper age, markings and weight, and without any defect, since otherwise the Roncalese would refuse them "because they are for the tribute". The "French" lead half of each cow onto Navarrese soil, and it is accepted if in good condition, as are the other two, placing them in safekeeping, because if any of the animals returns to France, the French are not obliged to deliver another in its place. Then comes the appointment of the wardens and the settlement of grievances. The account continues: "after these things, the Roncalese, with the generosity of hidalgos, at once give the French a snack of bread, wine, and very fine hams of bacon, and they do the same for all who come to the festival". The rest of the day a fair takes place on the "French" side, with the sale of rams, oxen, mares and other livestock.

The greatest difficulties for the continuity of the international treaty occurred throughout the 17th century. At the ceremony of 1612, two of the cattle were rejected because, in the opinion of the Roncalese, they were more than two years old and had other defects. They lodged a formal protest and withdrew in bad temper to a distance of a musket shot from the Baretous people. Immediately, seeking agreement, the ceremony resumed, accepting one more cow but not the third. After "many give-and-takes" and rising tempers, no agreement was reached and each party returned to its own territory. Under the pact, there were three days to present the missing animal in the square of Isaba. However, this proved useless. After a month, the Roncalese decided to appeal. Although there were supporters of violent action, a formal demand was made to the people of Ansó, as guarantors of the sentence of 1375. However, this was not a good moment either, since the people of Ansó and Roncal were themselves in disputes over shared or facero lands. Ultimately nothing came of it. It was proposed to bring the matter before the queen of France Anne of Austria, wife of Louis XIII of France and II of Navarre, or to litigate in the French courts. However, these steps were not taken and they negotiated directly with the Baretous people (who at the time were also called Bretons or Périgourdins). They demanded that the cows be examined by persons external to the parties, which the Roncalese opposed on the grounds of long-established custom.

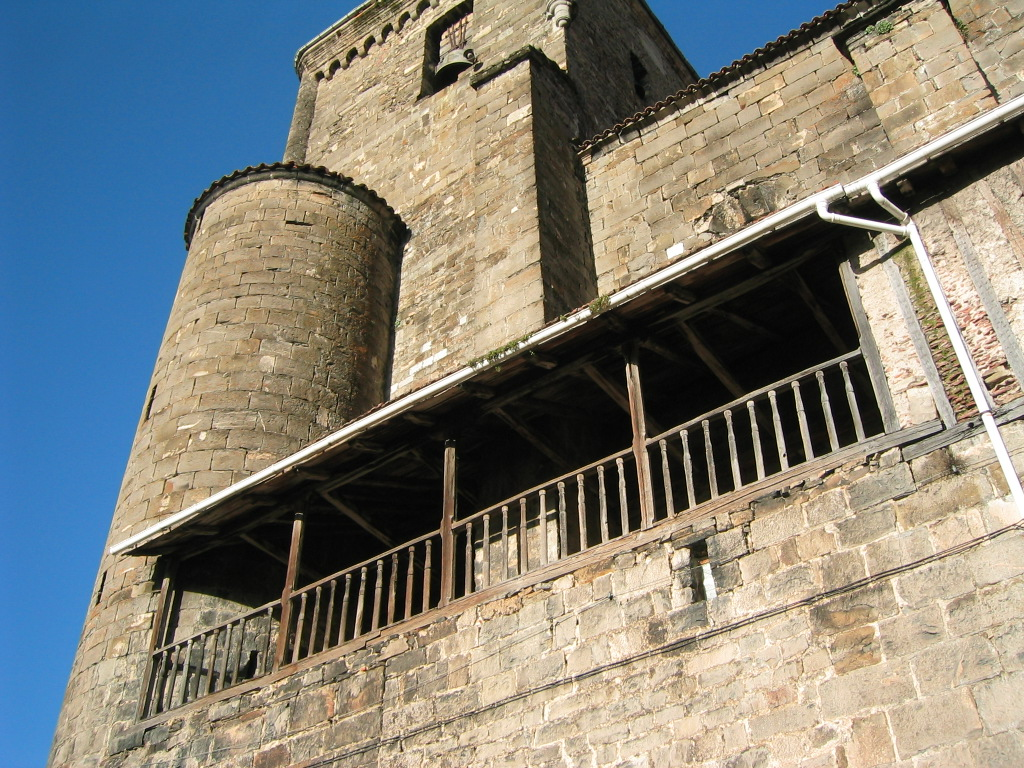
Church of Saint Cyprian in Isaba, built in the 15th century. The earlier church, along with almost the entire town, had burned in 1427. In this fire the original documents of the sentence were also destroyed, which helped intensify the conflict in the 17th century when the Baretous people demanded the originals.

At the ceremony of 1614, the presentation of the original sentence of 1375 was again requested; it had disappeared in the fire of Isaba in 1427. After swearing to keep the peace and the pasture arrangements as their ancestors had done, and after appointing the wardens, at the moment of delivery the Baretous representative demanded the original document to verify whether this obligation was temporary or perpetual. The man from Isaba replied that it was perpetual and had been fulfilled for more than four hundred years. The Baretous people were threatened with the three thousand marks penalty provided in the sentence, yet they persisted in their demand. To overcome the difficulty, the Roncalese requested from Ansó the authorised copy prepared by Johan de Caseterat, notary of Oloron.

Initially, the copies were not accepted as valid, even though the Baretous people also possessed them. At the hearings of 1615 the matter was settled and the parties reconciled, finally accepting the copy from Ansó, the place of arbitration. The customary assembly was held, and the Baretous people brought their payments up to date, returning matters to normal for some years. At that time the Roncalese possessed about one hundred thousand head of sheep and roughly six thousand cattle.

In 1628 calm was broken by disagreements that would last until 1642, further complicated by the Thirty Years' War which had begun in 1635. During this time livestock seizures occurred on both sides, and the valley of Baretous refused to make the payment of the three cows.

In this situation the towns of the valley were divided, since Roncal, Burgui, and Vidángoz were not direct beneficiaries, as they did not receive the cows, and therefore refrained from offering support or covering expenses. The people of Uztarroz took justice into their own hands by seizing a thousand head of livestock, which they had to return after their action was disapproved by the viceroy, Luis Bravo de Acuña, and the Royal Council of Navarre.

In 1635 the aforementioned Thirty Years' War began, and the viceroy Marquis of Valparaíso organised an expedition into the valley of Baretous, capturing more than four thousand head of small livestock and about eighty of large stock. These were divided into eight lots, two of them for Isaba. The Baretous people carried out retaliation and, despite the prohibition on Roncalese herds going up to the mountain passes, they managed to seize about five thousand sheep and rams and eighty head of larger livestock. They also stripped them of everything they carried: caps, cloaks, sandals, knitted stockings, bags, cauldrons, bread, and cheeses. Some of the shepherds were beaten, and four were taken to Oloron as hostages, where they were held for two years until ransomed.

Livestock seizures were repeated in 1638 by the Baretous people on two occasions, and the Roncalese did the same the following year and again in 1642. This was a situation similar to that of the 14th century, though apparently without any deaths. Contributing to this was the withdrawal of the people of Ansó from their role as arbitrators. Finally several meetings were held in Sainte-Engrâce, with the rector acting as arbitrator, and agreement was reached on 22 August 1642. By this concord, the old peace charter of 1375 remained in force and the Baretous people were exempted from all obligations for the years in which they had failed to deliver the cattle (since 1630). The Roncal valley had to pay eleven thousand francs to recover its herds, while Domingo Ederra remained as hostage in the house of the mayor of Arette.

This long lawsuit left internal divisions within the valley of Roncal itself, reflected in the case of 1647 (which was not upheld and therefore produced no change): Roncal, Burgui, and Vidángoz had requested that the cows of the Tribute be distributed among all the towns of the valley, with the expenses likewise shared.

The first recorded interruption of the tribute dates back to 1698, when the Barétous valley paid a fine of 300 silver marks instead. In 1755, one of the cows was rejected by Roncal, having been found blemished, small, ill-coated and with other defects. The cow was substituted within a fortnight, and carried by the Barétous to Isaba.

The first major interruption of the Tribute ceremony took place during the War of the Convention that started in 1793 between France and Spain. Due to the presence of troops in the Pyrenean mountain passes, the representatives of Aramits were prevented from climbing to the Col of la Pierre St Martin, so they instead took the cows all the way to Isaba the following month, leaving the cows in Isaba's main square on 17 August 1793.

During the Peninsular War, the dates of the ceremony were moved. In 1810, the ceremony took place on 16 July, and from 1811 to 1814 it was paid in money instead.

The Treaty of Bayonne of 1856 established the modern border between France and Spain, and was aimed at solving the proverbial problems surrounding the grazing grounds in the Pyrenees. As a result of this treaty, the pierre de St Martin (the traditional boundary marker around which the ceremony had taken place since 1375) was removed and substituted by a simple boundary marker, around which the ceremony takes place ever since.

The tribute started to become notorious at the end of the 19th century, when it was popularised in France in numerous books and news articles, usually in negative light as a humiliation towards the people of France. The negative press prompted an attempt in 1895 to substitute the cows for money, without success. That year, Le Figaro published an open letter protesting against a ceremony they deemed extravagant and anti-French. The ceremony was described as a war tribute, where the Barétous had to uncover their heads whilst the Roncalese could wear their hats, and where the Barétous had to advance towards the Roncalese whilst the latter pointed at them with pike. As a result, over 600 people climbed the Col de la Pierre St Martin that year to demonstrate against the ceremony.

The second major interruption of the ceremony took place in 1944, when the Nazis prevented the French from partaking of the ceremony out of fear they would attempt to escape to Spain instead. As compensation, the Barétous provided an additional cow for the following two years, the last one being forgiven by the Roncalese.

Due to difficult access and rough terrain around the Col de la Pierre St Martin, until the mid 20th century the representatives of Roncal and Barétous had to depart the day before the ceremony and then spend a night mid-way. In the 1960s, a road was built from Spain to the summit, and it was soon connected to the French valleys when the Arette-Pierre-Saint-Martin ski resort was built on the French side, near the summit. Thereafter, the ceremony has become a prime touristic event, drawing increasing numbers of people every year.

== Gallery ==
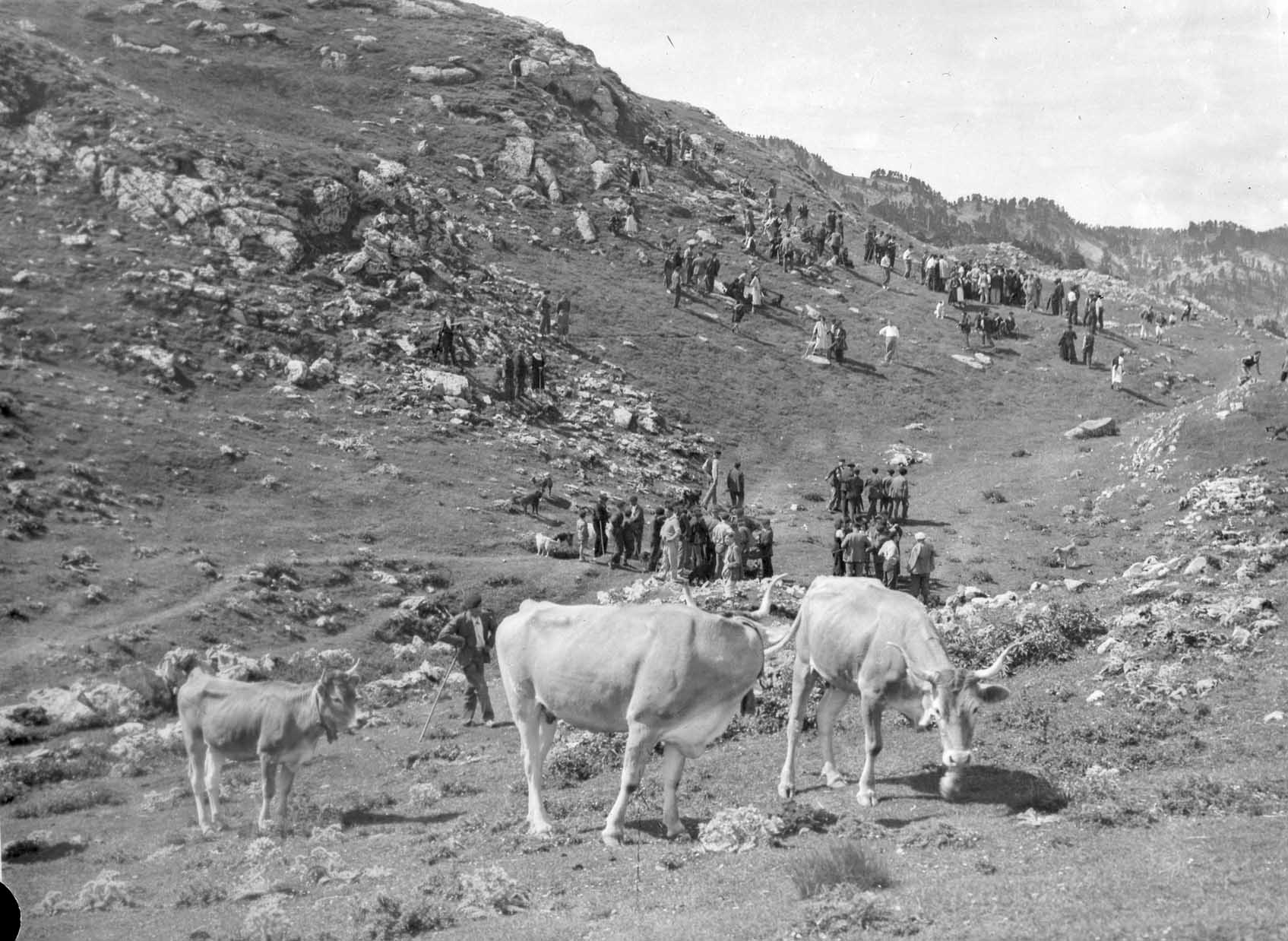
The tribute in 1960

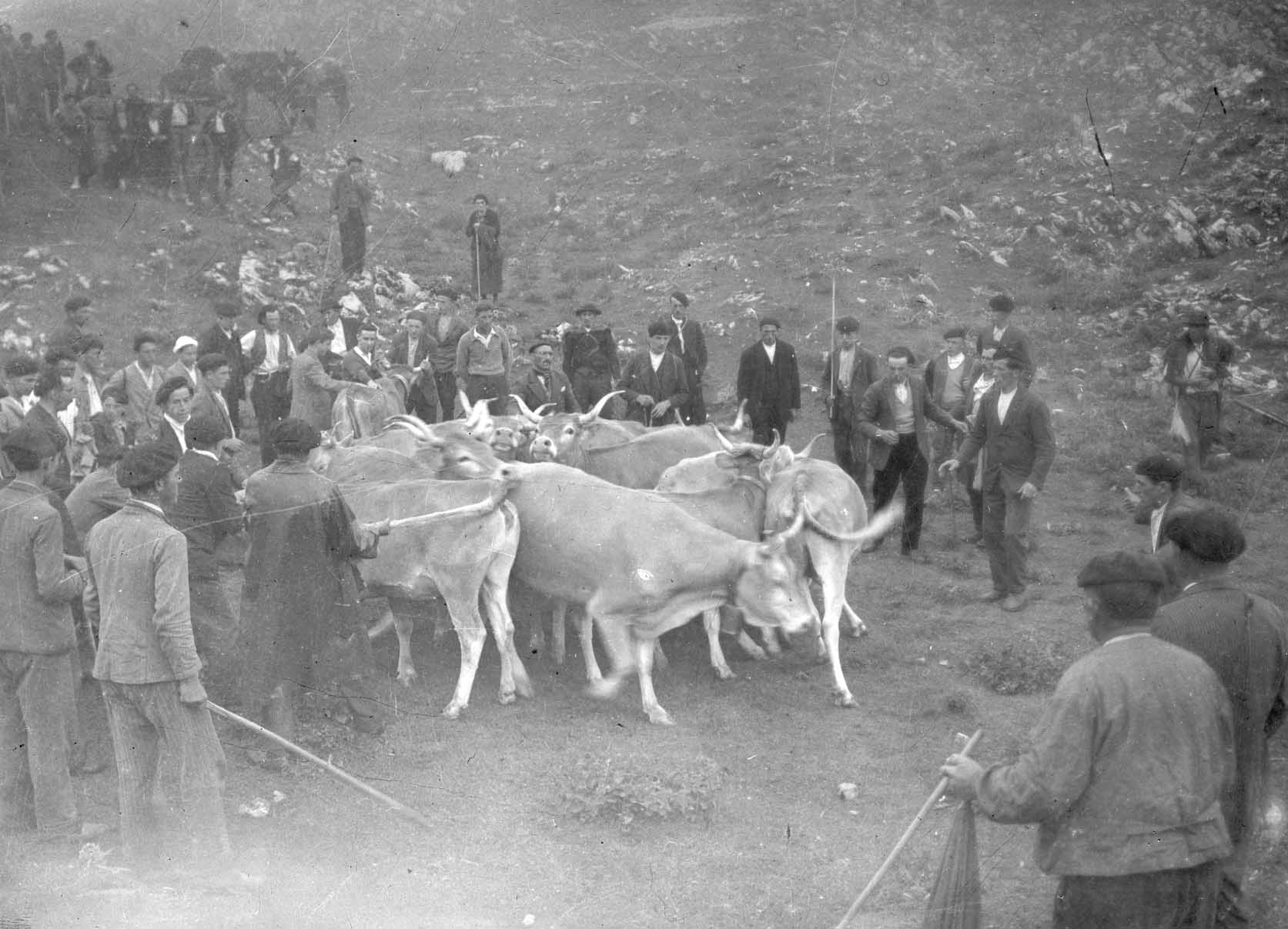
The tribute in 1960

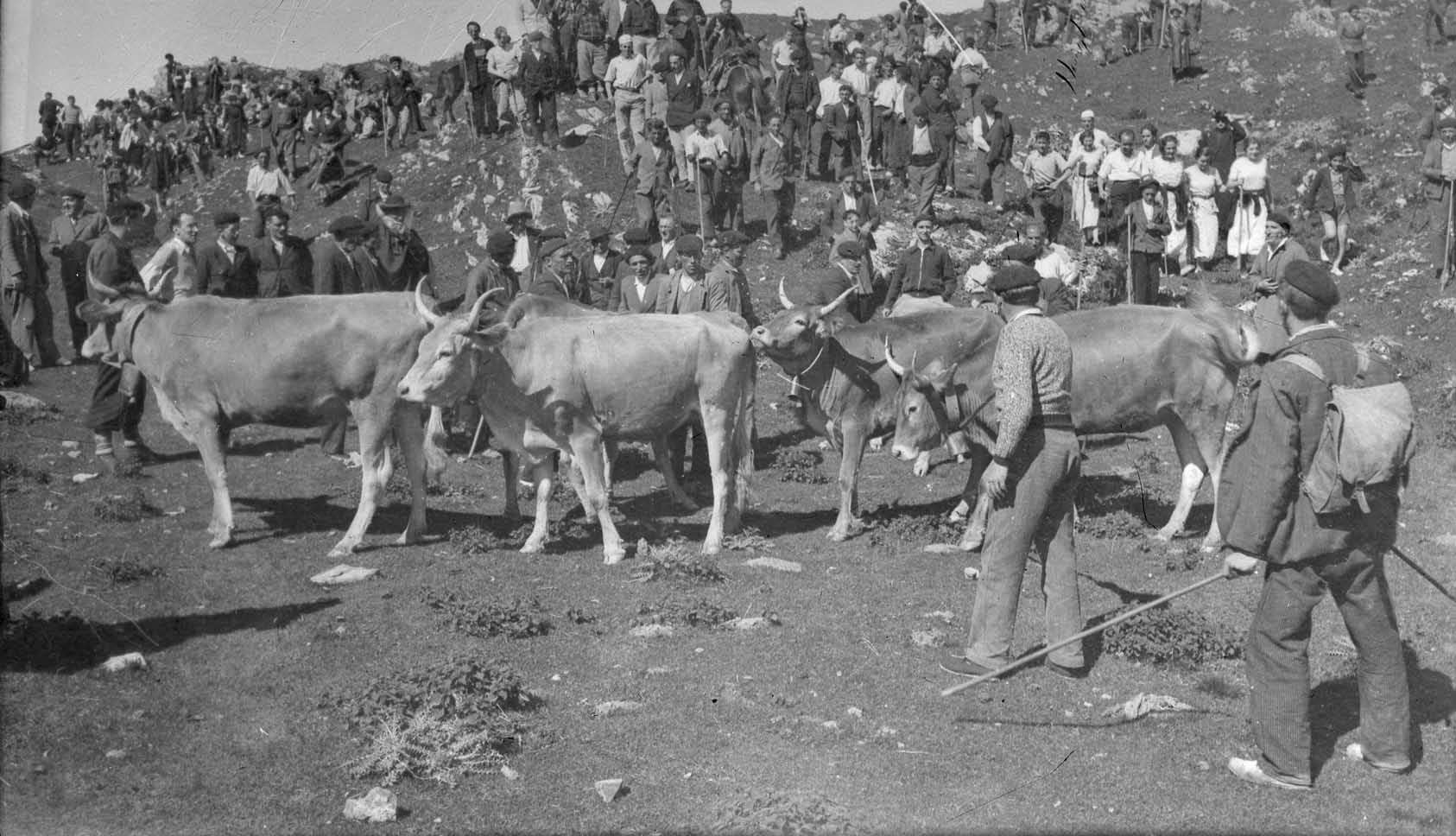
The tribute in 1960
