= Roncal Valley =

Coordinates: 42°49′58″N 0°53′16″W

Roncal Valley Valle de Roncal
- Mancomunidad
- Flag Coat of arms

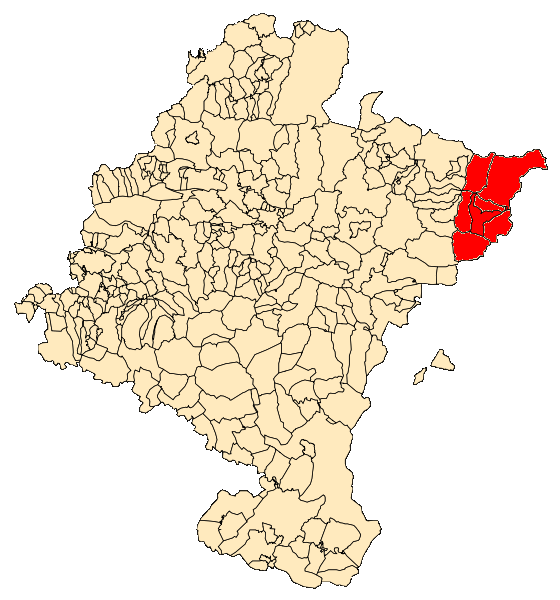
- Country: Spain
- Autonomous community: Navarre
- Municipalities: List: Burgui-Burgi; Garde; Isaba; Roncal – Erronkari; Urzainqui – Urzainki; Uztárroz – Uztarrotze; Vidángoz – Bidankoze

Population (2021)
  - Total: 1,266
- Time zone: UTC+1 (CET)
  - Summer (DST): UTC+2 (CEST)

The Roncal Valley (Standard Basque: Erronkaribar, Spanish: Valle de Roncal) is a valley and mancomunidad in the very east of Navarre, bordering the autonomous community of Aragon to the East and France to the north. It is part of the Merindad of Sangüesa. The Ezka, a tributary of the Aragón, flows from north to south through the center of the valley.

The Roncalese dialect of Basque was historically spoken within this valley. It shares its name with the town and municipality of Roncal. While the last speakers of the valley's traditional dialect have died, the valley is located in Navarre's mixed language zone and does have a number of Basque speakers.

== Government ==
The valley, as a local entity, is classified as an agrupación de carácter tradicional or "grouping of traditional character" within Navarre. It is governed by a junta general or general council, consisting of 21 members, three from each village.

== Tourism ==
As a tourist destination, the Roncal Valley is known for hiking trails in the Pyrenees, its villages, the tomb of the tenor Julián Gayarre, and the Larra-Belagua Ski Center.

== Cheese ==
The Roncal Valley is well known for its local artisan cheese, named Roncal cheese after the valley. Inhabitants of the valley have worked to develop food tourism based on the local cheese. The milk used to make Roncal cheese comes from Rasa Aragonesa and Latxa sheep who feed on pastures and forage. The cheese is left to mature for at least four months after being dry-salted, and it is said to smell like herbs and flowers after fully ripening. The cheese's flavor is slightly piquant, or rich and olive-like, and it has a smooth brown rind. Many of the methods involved in preparing Roncal cheese are family secrets. The cheese enjoys Spanish denominación de origen and EU Protected designation of origin status.

== Language ==
The Roncal Valley was historically home to the Roncalese dialect of Basque and all of its municipalities are located in Navarre's mixed language zone. The last native speakers of Roncalese Basque died in the 1970s and 80s, and the Spanish spoken in the area retains some influence from Basque.

Notably, in Spanish, word-final -r corresponds to a single, tapped -r- in related words. The demonyms used in the Roncal Valley's Spanish are likely the only exceptions to that rule, because of Basque influence. In Basque, word-final -r typically corresponds to a double, trilled -rr- in related words. According to José Ignacio Hualde, in the Roncal Valley's Spanish, each town's demonym is formed with the borrowed Basque suffix -(t)ar, whose final -r becomes a trill before the Spanish plural or feminine form. Thus, the masculine single form gardar 'man from Garde' corresponds to the feminine gardarra and the plural gardarres. This is restricted to the Roncal Valley because of a particularity of Roncalese Basque. In other dialects the citation form of nouns has the article -a at the end, and nouns and adjectives borrowed into Spanish under that form. Thus, in other areas the equivalent suffix is borrowed as -(t)arra, as in donostiarra 'from Donostia'.

== See also ==
- Salazar Valley
