= Treaties of Good Correspondence =

Agreements between French and Spanish Basques

Treaty of Good Correspondence
- Long title: Treaty of Good Correspondence
- Territorial extent: Basque Country and Territorial waters
- Signed by: Spain (BiscayGipuzkoa); Kingdom of France (Labourd, Bayonne)
- Commenced: Since the 13th century

The Treaties of Good Correspondence were agreements drawn up under the Ancien Régime by the Basques of France and those of Spain, designed to guarantee the continuity of their economic relations despite the wars between the two countries.

The first treaties appeared at the end of the 13th century and remained in use until the early 19th century. They were signed on Île des Faisans by representatives of each of the parties, under the supervision of the highest authorities of each of the two states, France and Spain.

Other examples of the same economic pragmatism can still be found today all along the border between Spain and France, the latest dating from 1957 between Bera and Sare. On the other hand, other peoples, such as the Sámi, still use the same logic to protect themselves from the political ups and downs between states.

== History ==
Arthur de Boislisle noted: "You know how difficult it is to prevent the people of Labourd from following their ancient customs; nor are you unaware that, at whatever price, the inhabitants of the mountains of France and Spain wish to consecrate their union, which the fiercest wars have never been able to interrupt [...]".

The first treaties, whose actual title is "Treaties of Commerce or Good Correspondence between the Inhabitants of the Government of Bayonne and the Bailiwick of Labourd and those of the Provinces of Guipuscoa and the Seigniory of Biscay (Note: p. 161 - Archives municipales de Bayonne - BB. 25, F.° 22.)", seem to date from the end of the thirteenth century (1294) and the beginning of the fourteenth century (1306, 1309, 1311 and 1328) (Note: References for the years 1294, 1306 and 1309 are given by Joseph Nogaret (1925). Saint-Jean-de-Luz des origines à nos jours (in French). Bayonne: Imprimerie du Courrier. p. 19..) (Note: p. 162 - Les références 1311 et 1328 sont issues du Livre des Êtablissements, pages 264 et 274.) - at the time, the aim was to regularize the restitution of pinnaces stolen by the inhabitants of Bayonne or Biarritz, as well as those of Santander or Castro-Urdiales. (Note: p. 302.) Nevertheless, the most numerous treaties date from the seventeenth century. M. Habasque and the Intendant de Bezons date the origin of these treaties to 1625 and 1653 respectively. (Note: p. 162 - Mémoire de l'intendant de Bezons, page 215.)

The Bayonne municipal archives record treaties dated October 17, 1536, September 30, 1537, December 23, 1652, December 20, 1653, December 13, 1654, (Note: p. 163 - For the three references of 1652, 1653 et 1654 : Bayonne's municipales archives, AA 13.) 1667, 1675 and 1690. (Note: p. 163 - Bayonne's municipal archives de, BB 27 for 1667, BB 28 for 1675 et BB 72 for 1690.) The Saint-Jean-de-Luz archives mention the treaty of 1719. (Note: p. 168 - Saint-Jean-de-Luz's municipal archives, BB 6.)

Following the alliance of the Bourbons of France and Spain in the 18th century, these treaties lost their usefulness. During this century, we should note the treaty of 1719, established during the Regent's war against Philip V, and that of 1795, during the occupation of Guipuscoa by Directory troops, concluded with Biscay.

As a final illustration of these treaties, in 1808 Napoleon authorized Bayonne to supply Irun, an authorization he extended in 1810 to the whole of Gipuzkoa and Biscay. (Note: p. 168.)

== Range ==
The treaties concerned commercial and pastoral activities in the French and Spanish parts of the Basque country. The Pyrénées-Atlantiques departmental archives noted that: "As Labourd borders Spain via the famous Mondarrain mountain at Itxassou, via Sare and the Urrugne pass, the inhabitants take their herds to graze on the Spanish mountains, which are not subject to flies like ours, and in turn, the Spaniards take their herds to our mountains where there is less snow. There are secret treaties between them, and so as not to be noticed, from time to time they take cattle away from each other, and this so-called war ends when the catches on both sides are equal [...]". (Note: p. 161 et 162 - Pyrénées-Atlantiques' departamental archives, C 105.)

Notwithstanding these pastoral realities, the real purpose of these treaties was to regulate maritime relations and exchanges between Bayonne, Labourd, Guipuscoa and Biscay, with the aim of making the ports prosper, following, for example, agreements allowing Labourd boats to winter in Spanish Basque ports, notably Pasajes, given the inadequacy of shelters in French or English ports (Bayonne). Inter-regional cooperation was hampered by the outbreak of war, which in particular enabled privateering.

The following commodities and goods were commonly traded: (Note: p. 166 - Bayonne's municipal archives, AA 9.)

- all types of vegetables and bread cereals such as wheat, rye and barley;
- preserved fish (dry and green cod, whale meat and blubber, pickled fish or escabetche);
- cattle, sheep and pigs;
- manufactured products (or petrecheries) such as pitch, resin, tar, tallow, rope, "Ollones and noyales (Note: Heavy-duty canvas manufactured in Noyal, near Rennes.) hemp except and except cannons, powder, wicks, bullets and any other kind of weapons, which will be prohibited on both sides [...]".

Treaties commonly stipulated that "vessels may reciprocally use the ports and remain there all the time necessary to refuel and repair their damage without being seized or captured, on condition that they are provided with safe-conducts, issued by the military governor of Bayonne, for Spanish vessels, and by the governors general of Biscay and Guipuscoa for French vessels [...]". (Note: p. 166 - Bayonne's municipal archives, BB 30.)

One of these treaties, dating from 1719, paved the way for the concepts that would become part of today's maritime law. It set at "four leagues from the coast the extent of the territorial sea, which forms a fictitious extension of the national territory". (Note: Four leagues are equivalent to 22.224 km.) It also stated that "no act of war may take place in this zone [...]" and that "if two enemy ships meet in the same port, one may not leave until twenty-four hours after the other [...]".

== Formalities ==
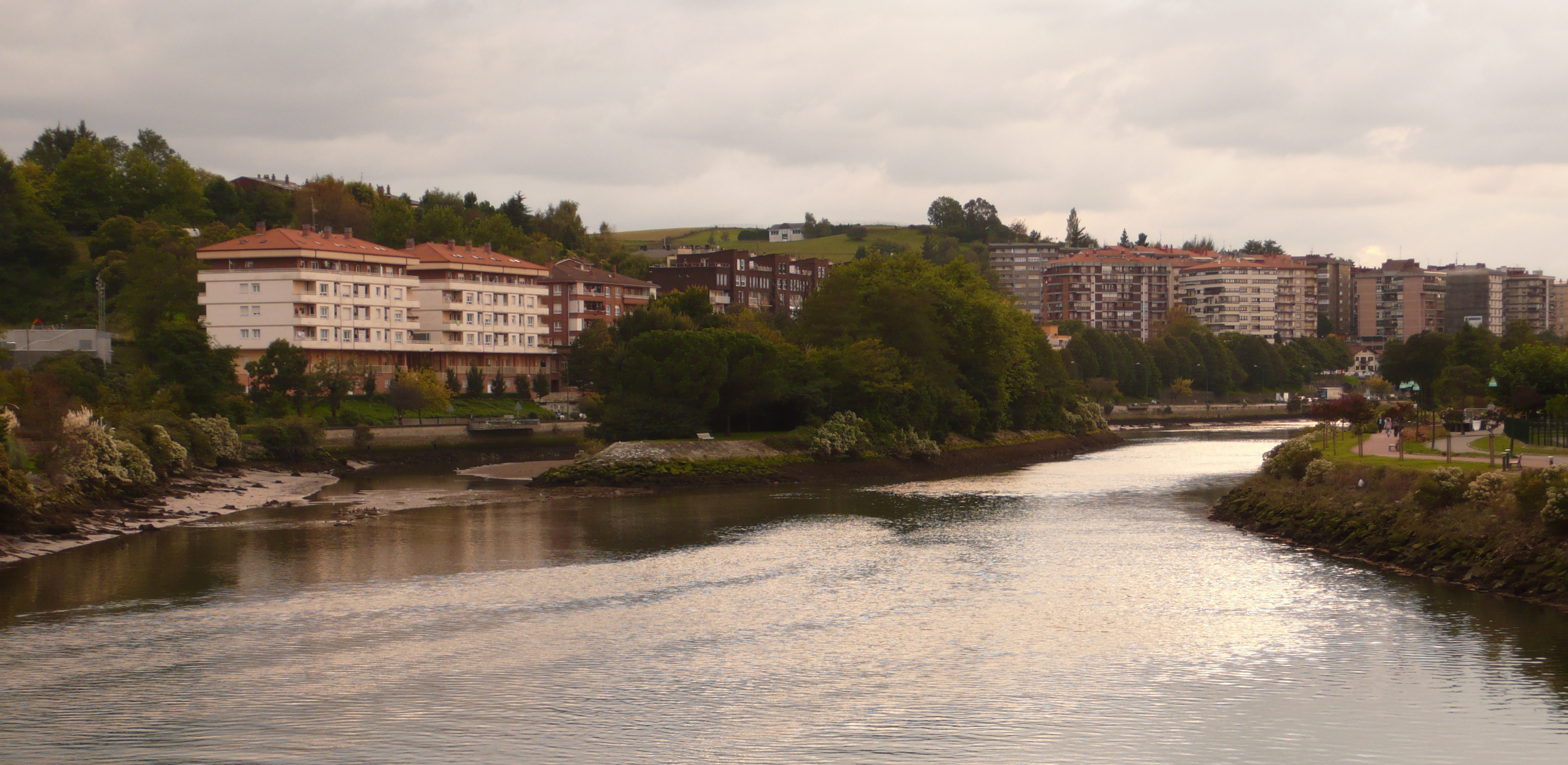
Ile des Faisans seen from the international bridge over the Bidassoa. Left Irun, Spain; right Hendaye, France.

These treaties had to bring together the four traditional representations, Labourd and Bayonne on the one hand, and Guipuscoa and Biscay on the other. In July 1694, for example, the city of Bayonne refused to establish a treaty of Good Correspondence with Biscay alone. (Note: "The town cannot deal with the Seigniory of Biscay unless the provinces of Guipuzcoa and Labourt also enter into the agreement." - Bayonne municipal archives - BB 32, folio 45.)

The treaties, which more or less follow the structure of the 1653 agreement, contain twelve articles - those of 1536-1537 have only nine. After the first four articles, which set out certain general provisions, (Note: According to Caroline Lugat (2006). Les Traités de Bonne Correspondance : une dérogation aux règles du droit maritime international ? (PDF). Itsas Memoria. Revista de Estudios Marítimos del País Vasco, Donostia-San Sebastián. p. 303., "Article 1 cancels ongoing disputes, whether on land or at sea. Article 2 seeks to maintain peace by preserving the future, by establishing penal sanctions against any offender to guarantee the proper application of the treaty. Articles 3 and 4 set out in very precise terms the territorial limits determining the treaty's jurisdiction".) the conventions of commerce and navigation themselves are dealt with, in particular the establishment of a passport which "legitimizes the voyage and protects the ship and merchandise from capture". (Note: p. 303.)

all ships [...] sailing with goods may not be taken by any subject of the kings of France and Spain, provided they are in possession of a passport [...]. (Note: Extract from article 5 of the Treaty of Good Correspondence of July 10, 1675 - Departmental Archives of Pyrénées-Atlantiques, Admiralty Register B 8695, cited by Caroline Lugat (2006). Les Traités de Bonne Correspondance : une dérogation aux règles du droit maritime international ? (PDF). Itsas Memoria. Revista de Estudios Marítimos del País Vasco, Donostia-San Sebastián..)

Article 7 goes even further, as it excludes Basque vessels from the "good catch" status recognized for privateer vessels:

In the event that, in violation of the present treaty, any of the subjects of the kings of France and Spain wish to take vessels or merchandise from those included in the said treaty, and that the said vessels or merchandise are taken either to the port of the said government or the said province, or to some other port in France or Spain [...] the inhabitants shall be respectively obliged to take the necessary steps [...] to have the said vessels and merchandise returned -article 7 then insists that only Basque vessels are concerned- [...] which others shall not enjoy this freedom [...]. (Note: However, the refund will be reduced by "men-of-war, munitions, cannons other than for the defense of said vessels [...]", which will be declared a good catch if found on board, as mentioned in article 7 of the Treaty of Bonne Correspondence of July 4, 1653, (Bayonne's municipal archives, AA8, Caroline Lugat (2006). Les Traités de Bonne Correspondance : une dérogation aux règles du droit maritime international ? (PDF). Itsas Memoria. Revista de Estudios Marítimos del País Vasco, Donostia-San Sebastián. p. 304.).)

The conclusion of these treaties was handled by deputies from each interested province. The Biltzar had the right to appoint delegates from Labourd. (Note: The minutes of the meeting of October 15, 1693, devoted to this choice, mentioned the obligation "to choose deputies from among the most apparent and intelligent, who know how to reason and follow the instructions they may be given". The syndic and the Procureur were generally appointed, and accompanied by one or two notables - Planthion, royal notary in Arbonne, Inventory and description of the Privileges and Franchises of Labourd, Bayonne - 1713 page 116.) Bayonne's delegates were elected by the "Corps de Ville". The recurring rivalry for precedence between the representatives of Labourd and Bayonne led the king to resolve the conflict by imposing the following diplomatic procedure: (Note: p. 164 - Bayonne's municipal archives, FF 460.) the delegates from Bayonne first discussed with the representatives of the two Spanish provinces, and the next day, the Labourdins began their talks with the same Spanish delegates. Although discussed on different days, the various treaties bear the same date (separate treaties which will nevertheless be signed on the same day), in order to spare the susceptibility of the Labourdins, disadvantaged by the order of precedence accorded to the Bayonnais.

On the appointed date, (Note: p. 164 - The Saint-Jean-de-Luz's archives (BB6) conserve a "letter from the Bayles and Jurats of Saint-Jean-de-Luz to MM. les Alcades Régidores de la très Valeureuse Cité de Fontarrabie, to ask them for a suitable day".) delegates from the four representations met on Île des Faisans, or Conference Island. A notary who had witnessed the separate negotiations then drew up the deed and handed a copy to each of the delegations.

Although these treaties appear to have been negotiated directly between the deputies of the Basque provinces belonging to two different countries, in the absence of any representative of the royal authority, this freedom is only apparent. In fact, the King of France granted prior authorization. (Note: July 13, 1635 - "We hereby allow you to trade with the Spaniards for the foodstuffs and merchandise they are accustomed to purchasing locally, while expressly forbidding you to send any ship from the said Government to the Ports of Spain until you have our permission and We have otherwise ordered it. For such is our pleasure" - Louis XIII to the aldermen of Bayonne - Archives municipales de Bayonne, BB 24, citées par Étienne Dravasa. Les privilèges des Basques du Labourd sous l'Ancien Régime. San Sebastiàn - 1950. p. 165..) (Note: The Marine Ordinance of 1681 prohibited provincial governors from issuing passports: "Let us forbid all governors of our provinces, lieutenants general, particular governors of places and other officers of war from giving leave, passports and safe-conducts to go to sea [...]". Article 13, Book I: Admiralty officers and their jurisdiction, quoted by Caroline Lugat (2006). Les Traités de Bonne Correspondance : une dérogation aux règles du droit maritime international ? (PDF). Itsas Memoria. Revista de Estudios Marítimos del País Vasco, Donostia-San Sebastián. p. 303..) In addition, the King expressly confirmed each of the treaties, as evidenced by the documents preserved in the Bayonne archives. (Note: July 24, 1653 - Letters patent of Louis XIV, quoted by Étienne Dravasa. Les privilèges des Basques du Labourd sous l'Ancien Régime. San Sebastiàn - 1950. p. 165. - The Treaties took place "under the good pleasure of the King [...] which the said inhabitants of our said Town of Bayone and Païs de Labourd would have very humbly begged us to agree and approve on our part to give them the means to earn their living in trade".) (Note: August 8, 1694 - Louis XIV to Marshal de Grammont - "I have been informed that the Peoples of the province of Guipuzcoa and the Seigniory of Biscay, having continued their requests for the renewal of a Treaty of Good Correspondence for Commerce with those of my Païs de Labourd and borders of Bayonne, as was done in 1653 [... ] whereupon I am writing you this Letter to tell you that in the event of renewal of the said Treaty, you are to allow my subjects from Bayonne and the Païs de Labourd to send some of the principal among them to assemble with the deputies from the provinces of Guipuzcoa and Biscaye as was done for the same purpose on the said borders to pass and conclude the said Treaty. And when it is agreed, you will send it to me to be confirmed by me." - Bayonne's municipal archives AA 10, cited by Étienne Dravasa. Les privilèges des Basques du Labourd sous l'Ancien Régime. San Sebastiàn - 1950. p. 165..) On September 20, 1694, the Duc de Grammont represented "in Bayonne the ratification of the Treaty of Correspondence made by the King between the Governor of Bayonne, the Syndic of Labourd, the Province of Guipuzcoa and the Seigneury of Biscay". (Note: p. 165 - Bayonne's municipal archives, BB 25, folio 50.) The same was true for the Spanish side, since article 12 of the 1653 treaty stipulated that "it shall be reciprocally ratified by Their Most Christian and Most Catholic Majesties" and registered in the "Admirautez de France et dans celles d'Espagne".

Complaints and claims arising from the application of these treaties were to be adjudicated within two months, by the "Alcades y Corregidores" - the mayors and procurators - of Biscay or Guipuscoa, on the Spanish side, or by the "mayors, aldermen and councils of Bayonne, by the bailiff of Labourd or the bayle of Saint-Jean-de-Luz", on the French side. (Note: p. 166.)

== Similar treaties ==
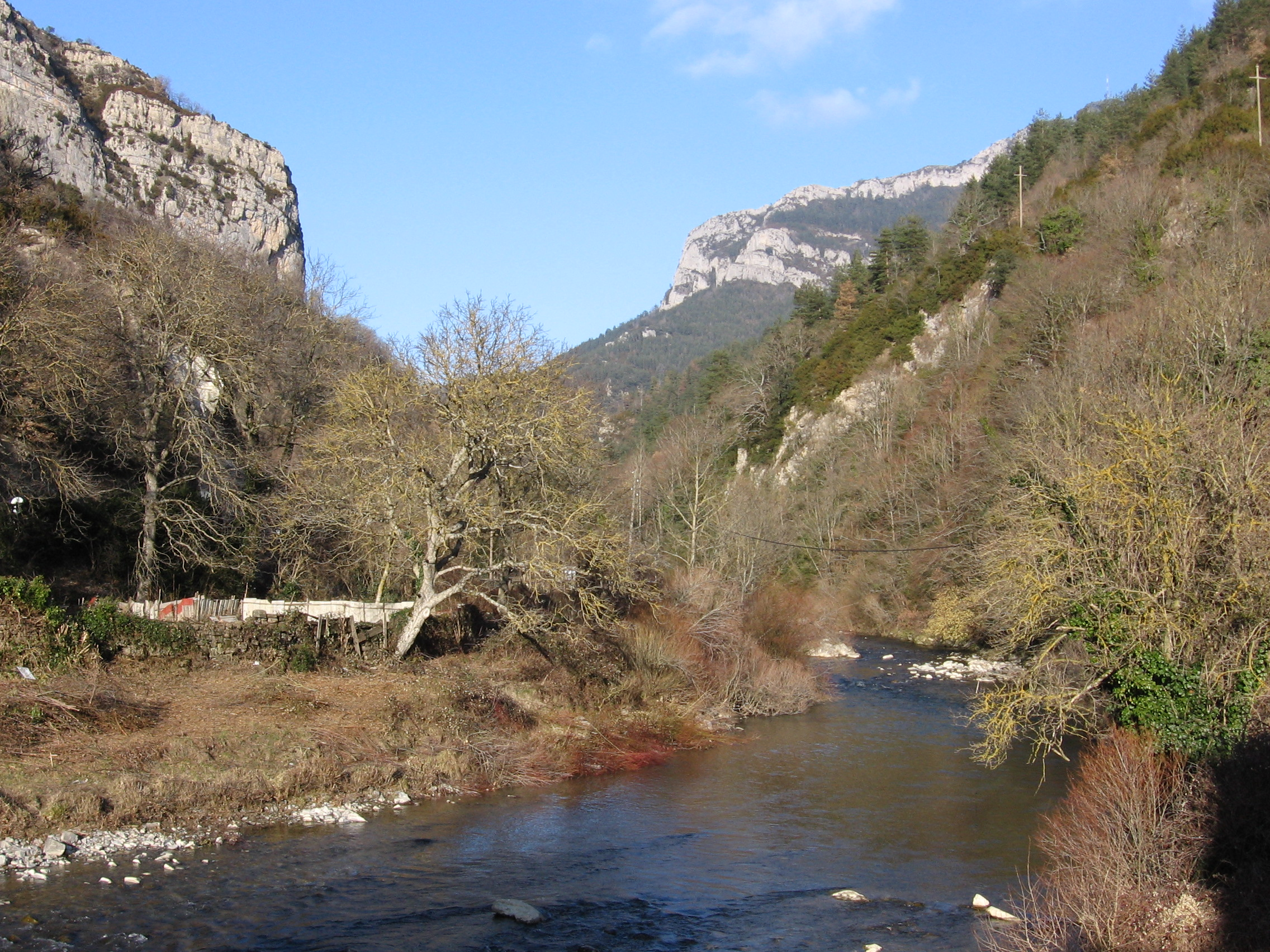
The Roncal valley near Urzainqui.

The ability to sign such cross-border treaties can be found further east, on the Franco-Spanish border, since, according to Léon Cadier, the Béarnais possessed this same faculty, also attributed by the fueros of the Val d'Aran to its inhabitants. The treaty bringing together the inhabitants of the Barétous valley and those of the Roncal valley are also worth mentioning, under the name of Tribute of the Three Cows, perpetuating to this day the pastoral dependence existing on both sides of the Pyrenees. The treaty of La Vesiau, or Port of Astun, was established between the Aragonese commune of Jaca and the communes of Etsaut, Urdos and Cette-Eygun in the upper Aspe valley.

Caroline Lugat likens these treaties, "in spirit and content, to the treaties of lees and passeries signed between the Pyrenean valleys during the Franco-Spanish wars". The Treaty of Bayonne acknowledged the survival of these treaties as part of customary pastoral law. The last treaty dates from November 3, 1957, between Vera de Bidassoa and Sare.

Étienne Dravasa points out that even today, the Sámi sign agreements with Sweden, Norway and Finland guaranteeing them access to grazing land, agreements that remain valid even in the event of war between the three states. (Note: p. 169, report Jean Fauchon. Laponie, Terre Étrange. Hommes et Mondes - juin 1949. p. 306..)

== See also ==
- Borders of France
- Quinto Real
- Institutions of the French Basque Country before 1789

== Bibliography ==
- Étienne Dravasa. Les privilèges des Basques du Labourd sous l'Ancien Régime (in French). San Sebastiàn - 1950.
- Maïté Lafourcade. Actes de la journée d'études du 16 novembre 1996 (in French). Centre d'Études basques de l'université de Pau et de Pays de L'Adour, Faculté pluridisciplinaire Bayonne-Anglet-Biarritz - 1996.Maïté Lafourcade is Professor of Legal History at the Université de Pau et des Pays de l'Adour.
- Caroline Lugat. Les Traités de Bonne Correspondance : une dérogation aux règles de droit maritime international (16th - 17th centuries) (in French). Itsas Memoria. Revista de Estudios Maritimos del Pais Vasco - San Sebastiàn - 2006.
- Joseph Nogaret (1925). Saint-Jean-de-Luz des origines à nos jours (in French). Bayonne: Imprimerie du Courrier.
