= Col de la Pierre St Martin =

Mountain pass on the France–Spain border

Col de la Pierre Saint-Martin
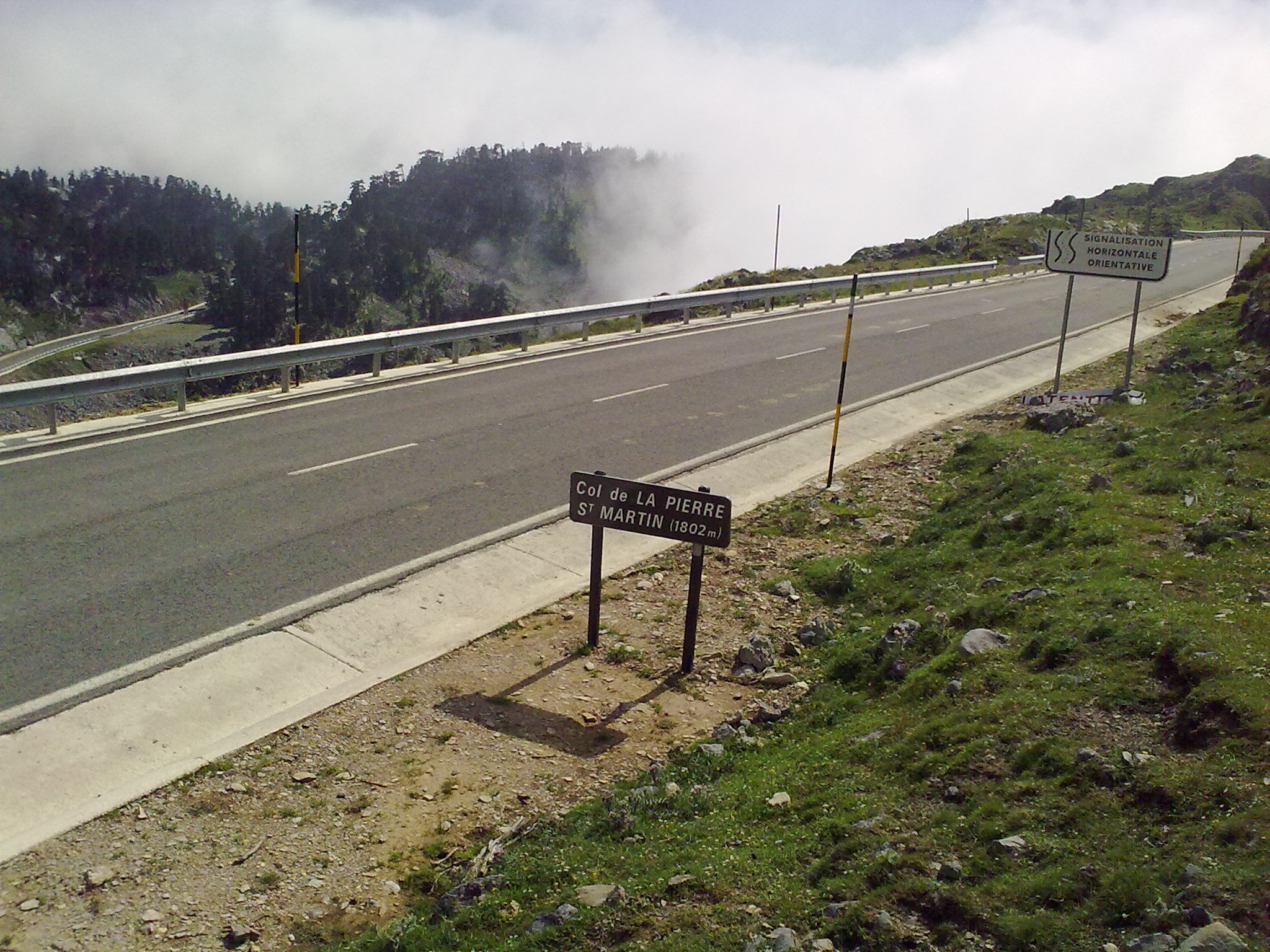

- Location within France
- Elevation: 1,765 metres (5,791 ft)
- Traversed by: D132/NA1370

Third Approach
- Location: Pyrénées-Atlantiques, France; Navarra, Spain
- Range: Pyrenees
- Coordinates: 42°58′13″N 0°45′57″W

Col de la Pierre Saint-Martin (elevation 1,765 m (5,791 ft)) is a mountain pass on the France–Spain border in the western Pyrenees in the department of Pyrénées-Atlantiques (France) and Navarra (Spain). The climb from the Spanish side was used in the 2007 Tour de France.

Close to the summit of the pass, there is the ski station of Arette-Pierre-Saint-Martin.

In 2015, on Bastille Day, the tenth leg of the Tour climbed the Col in the other direction, from Arette up to the village of Pierre Saint Martin, which hosted the end of a stage for the first time ever.

Every year on 13 July since 1375, the ceremony of the Tribute of the Three Cows takes place on the summit of the mountain pass.

== Details of the climb ==
The southern side of the climb, starting from Isaba (Navarra, Spain) is 27 km (17 mi) long at an average gradient of 3.6% (height gain – 966 m (3,169 ft)). The final stages of the climb start at Larra Belagua (1026m.) with 14 km (8.7 mi) at 5.2%, with a maximum of 7.4%.

The pass is situated south east of Oloron-Sainte-Marie. Starting from Arette (north east), the climb is 25.4 km (15.8 mi) long gaining 1,466 m (4,810 ft) (an average gradient of 5.7%). En route, the climb passes over the Col de Labays (1,351 m (4,432 ft)), the Pas de Guilhers (1,436 m (4,711 ft)) and the Col du Soudet (1,540 m (5,050 ft)).

== Tour de France ==
The climb from the south featured in 2007 in the Tour de France for the first time on the 218.5 km (135.8 mi) stage 16 from Orthez to Gourette–Col d'Aubisque. In 2015, the climb, coming from the north was featured as a stage finish for the first time on the 167 km (104 mi) stage 10 from Tarbes.

=== Tour de France stage finishes ===
Year	Stage	Start of Stage	Distance (km)	Category	Stage winner	Yellow Jersey
2015	10	Tarbes	167	HC	Chris Froome (GBR)	Chris Froome (GBR)

=== Passages in the Tour de France ===
Year	Stage	Category	Start	Finish	Leader at the summit
2007	16	1	Orthez	Gourette–Col d'Aubisque	Mauricio Soler (COL)
