= Ezka =

River in northeast Spain

Coordinates: 42°36′11″N 1°02′25″W

Ezka ibaia
- Ezka river
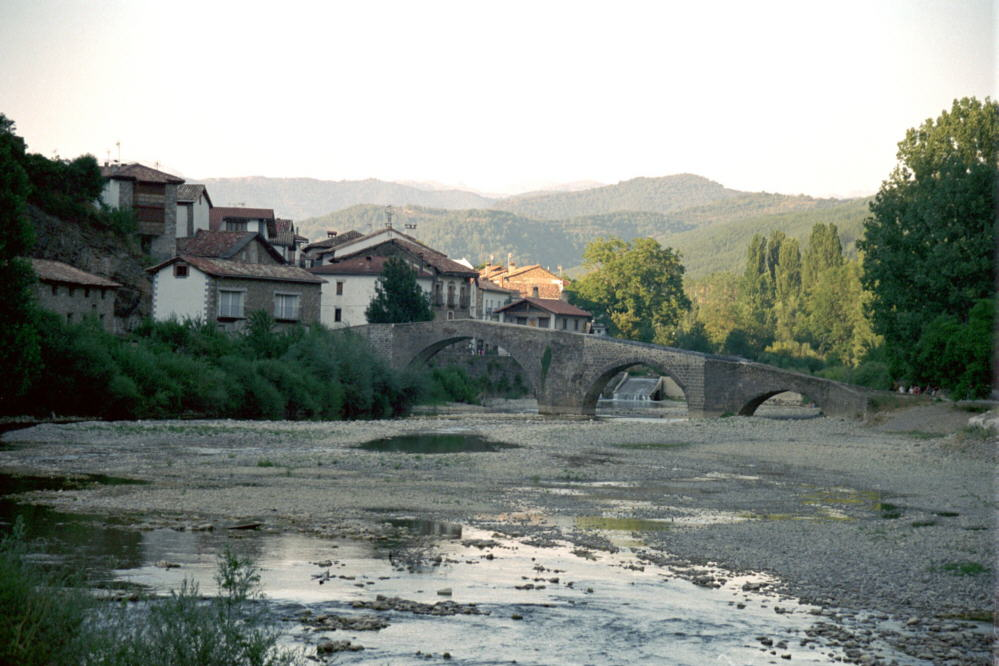
- Burgui and medieval bridge over the Ezka river.
- Location: Province of Navarre and Province of Zaragoza, Navarra, Spain
- Part of: Ebro river
- Primary inflows: Belagua river and Belabarze river
- Primary outflows: Aragón river

The Ezka river (in Spanish: Esca) is a tributary of the Aragon river that flows along 51 kilometers, mainly through the region of Navarra and to a lesser extent (14 kilometers) through Aragon (province of Zaragoza). It rises at the junction of the Belagua and Uztárroz rivers in the Navarre town of Isaba (Roncal Valley) and flows south through the valley to its mouth at the Yesa Reservoir, downstream from the Aragonese town of Sigüés (La Jacetania).

== Characteristics ==
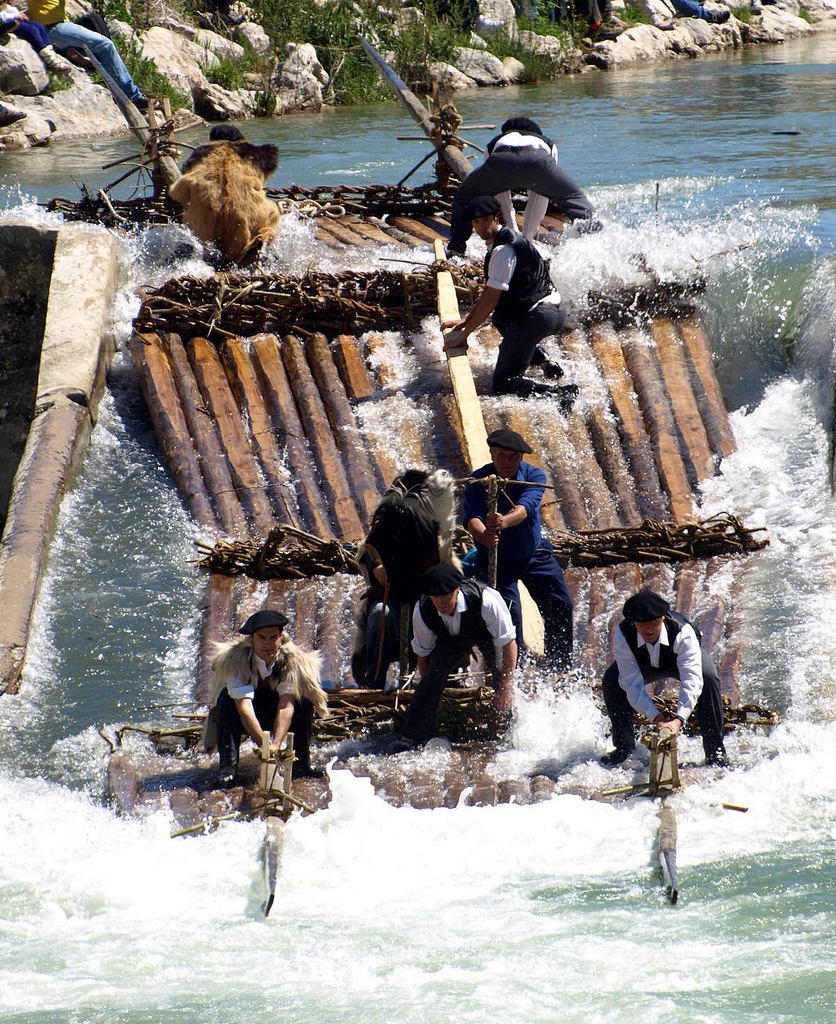
Image of the Day of the Almadía during the descent of the waters of the Ezka river.

=== Overflows ===
In times of great pluviometry, overflows of its waters take place that affect the communication way NA-137 (Burgui-Isaba-France).

=== Bathing area ===
The waters of this river are used as a bathing area during the summer in the Navarrese town of Burgui and in the Aragonese town of Salvatierra de Esca.

=== Festive events ===
Through the waters of this river, the Day of the Almadía takes place, a festival declared a Festival of Regional Tourist Interest in Navarra and a Festival of National Tourist Interest organized by the Cultural Association of Almadieros Navarros, which is held every year in the Navarrese town of Burgui (Roncal Valley).

== See also ==
- Aragón (river)
- Yesa reservoir
