= Amalia Núñez Dubús =

Spanish telegraphist and poet

- Born: March 22, 1889; Pamplona, Spain
- Died: August 30, 1977 (aged 88)
- Education: Teacher training (Magisterio)
- Occupations: Telegraphist, teacher, Esperantist, poet

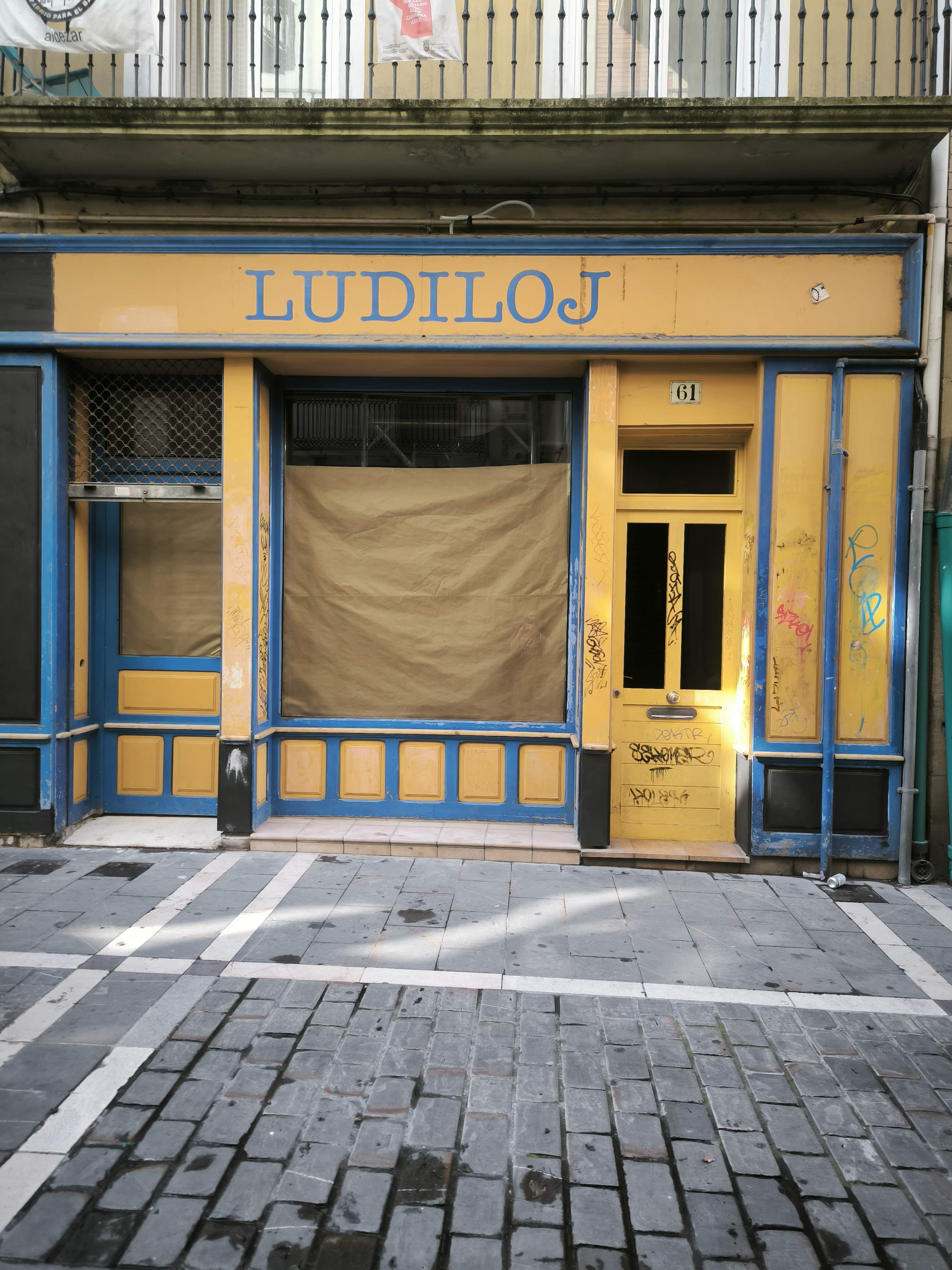
61 Mayor Street, Pamplona, with the "Ludiloj" ("toys" in Esperanto) sign. Amalia lived in this building. Today it is the headquarters of the Txalaparta bookstore.

Amalia Núñez Dubús (Pamplona, March 22, 1889 – August 30, 1977) was a Spanish telegraphist, teacher, Esperantist, and poet, notable for her contributions to Esperanto literature during the 20th century.

== Biography ==
She studied teaching (Magisterio) in Pamplona, combining her studies with her work as a telegraphist. Upon graduation, she worked as an assistant science teacher at the same teacher training school. Aligned with the progressive ideas of the era, she collaborated with the feminist press, serving as the Pamplona correspondent for the magazine La Voz de la Mujer, founded in 1917.

== Esperantist and literary career ==
She learned Esperanto in 1911. Shortly after, she joined the Board of Directors of the Pamplona Esperanto group alongside three other women. Starting in 1914, she began publishing Esperanto translations of Spanish literary classics in the magazine La Suno Hispana (including works by Lope de Vega, Larra, and Francisco Villaespesa), where in 1924 she published her first original poems: Fajroj ekbrulas ("Fires Ignite") and Soleco ("Solitude").

Her style caught the attention of the editors of the Budapest-based magazine Literatura Mondo. In 1934, editor Kálmán Kalocsay selected her poems for the famous anthology Dekdu Poetoj ("Twelve Poets"), commenting on her work:

«Some poems, with their helpless melancholy or their charming and soft love reverie, reveal the poetess; but in the others we are surprised by a philosophical depth, a cosmic meditation of dark hues and a severely restrained humor. The high themes are developed with the suggestion of a highly serious art. Here is, for example, "Rivero" (The River), in whose majestic and undulating Alexandrine verses all human destiny unfolds before us in a metaphor carried to perfection to the end. It is a truly "great" poem. But the "feminine" pieces are also of high rank. They are also built on an idea, but the fresh tone, the sincerity and the ease of expression give them a warm emotional background that strikes immediately.»

Following this recognition, she took charge of the literary section of the magazine Hispana Esperanto Gazeto. In her writings, she also addressed Basque themes, translating traditional legends and publishing an article on the Tribute of the Three Cows.

Between 1932 and 1934, she acted as Navarre's representative in the Federation of Esperanto Societies of Spain, which proposed to the Government of the Second Spanish Republic the introduction of Esperanto in schools. Her high level of proficiency in the language led her to become a member of the Spanish Esperanto Institute.

== Later years ==
Following the Spanish Civil War and during the Francoist regime, she had to maintain a low profile due to the language's associations with labor movements, though she remained active throughout her life. In 1958, Scottish poet William Auld included her in the international compilation Esperanta Antologio.

In 1966, she participated in the 27th Spanish Esperanto Congress held in Bilbao, where she presented Eterneco. Navarra legendo ("Eternity: A Navarre Legend"), a work based on the story of San Virila. She continued publishing texts regularly until the age of 86.

== Legacy ==
The preservation of her memory in Navarre has been linked to both local recognition and historical research. Towards the end of the 20th century, a shop named Ludiloj (meaning "toys" in Esperanto) was established on Mayor Street in Pamplona, near her former residence, as a tribute to her career. Furthermore, research by Basque Esperantism historian Rafa Blanco has been fundamental in locating, collecting, and cataloging her scattered literary work.
