= Orduna =

Orduna or Orduña may refer to:

- Orduña (officially Orduña-Urduña), a municipality in the province of Biscay, autonomous community of Basque Country, Spain
- Fructuoso Orduna (1893–1973), Spanish artist
- Joe Orduna (born 1948), American football running back
- Juan de Orduña (1900-1974), Spanish film director, screenwriter and actor
- Sergio Orduña (born 1954), Mexican football manager
- SS Orduña, an ocean liner (1913-1950)
