= Garde, Spain =

Garde
- Municipality
- Coat of arms

- Location in Spain
- Coordinates: 42°47′N 0°55′W
- Country: Spain
- Autonomous community: Navarre
- Province: Navarre
- Comarca: Valle de Roncal
- Mancomunidad: Merindad de Sangüesa

Government
  - Mayor: Marcos Ureña

Area
  - Total: 43.4 km^{2} (16.8 sq mi)
- Elevation: 737 m (2,418 ft)

Population (2025-01-01)
  - Total: 132
  - Density: 3.04/km^{2} (7.88/sq mi)
- Demonym: Gardar
- Time zone: UTC+1 (CET)
  - Summer (DST): UTC+2 (CEST)
- Postal code: 31414
- Dialing code: 948

Garde is a town and municipality located in the province and autonomous community of Navarre, northern Spain.
