= Monument to Alfonso XIII (Madrid) =

Monument in Madrid

Alfonso XIII
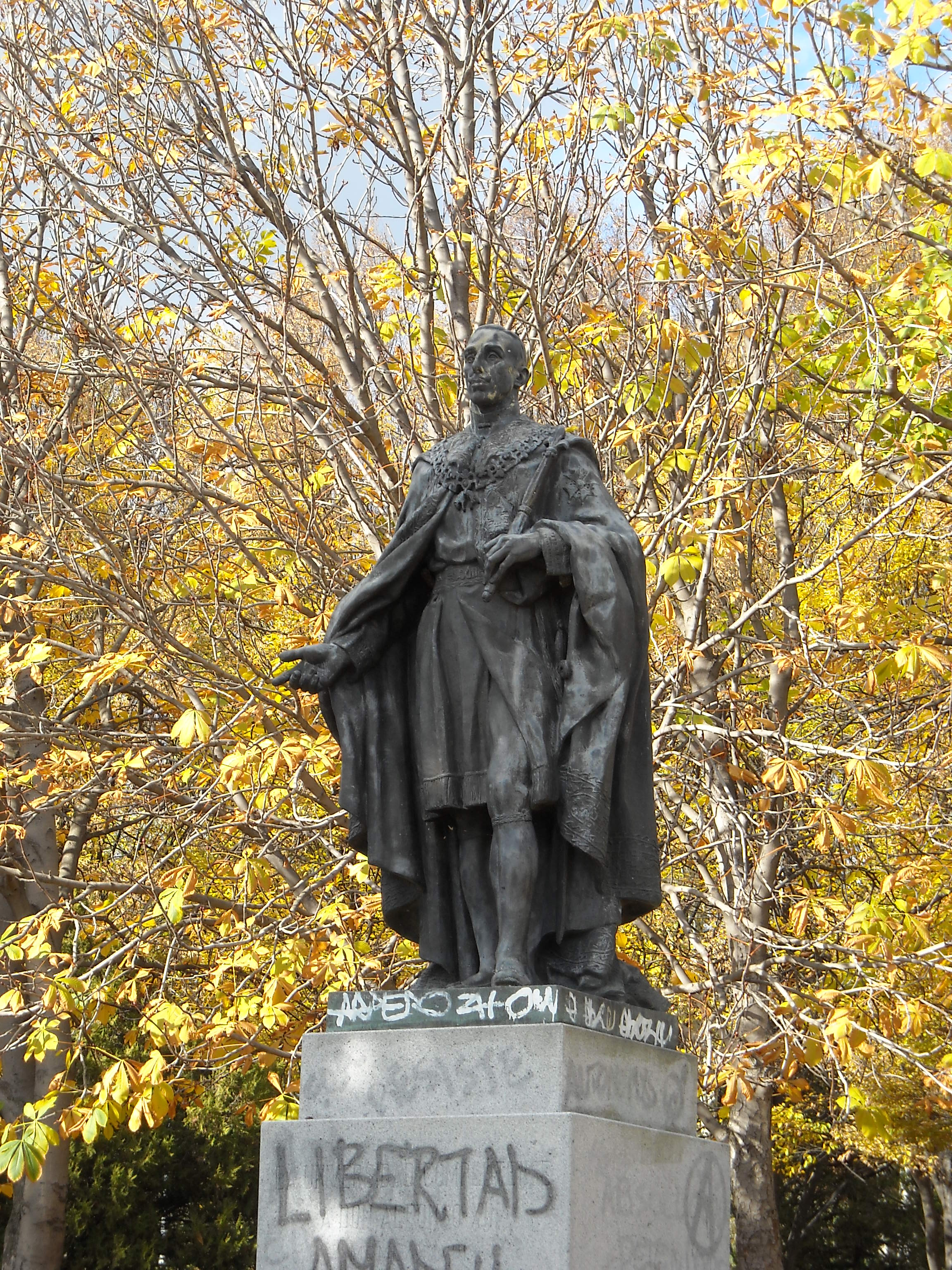
- 40.448711°N 3.728097°W
- Location: Ciudad Universitaria, Madrid, Spain
- Designer: Fructuoso Orduna
- Material: Bronze, stone
- Height: 2.5 m (statue)
- Opening date: 28 September 1988
- Dedicated to: Alfonso XIII

The Monument to Alfonso XIII is an instance of public art in Madrid, Spain. Located in the Ciudad Universitaria, it consists of a bronze statue dedicated to Alfonso XIII, signifying the latter's role as promoter behind the erection of the campus in the 1920s.

== History and description ==
The Permanent Committee of the Junta of Ciudad Universitaria awarded the design of a statue of Alfonso XIII to Fructuoso Orduna in March 1941. The statue is the casting of one of the two plaster models of the former monarch that Orduna completed back by 1946. The other one was about 5 metre high. The plaster sculpture languished for decades stored in Arganda del Rey until it was cast in bronze.

Gustavo Villapalos, the rector of the Complutense University of Madrid, decided to place the statue in the Ciudad Universitaria, and it was thus unveiled on 28 September 1988 during a ceremony attended by the Count of Barcelona (son of Alfonso XIII) and María de las Mercedes of Bourbon-Two Sicilies as well as their daughters Pilar and Margarita.

The bronze figure, about 2.5 metre high, consists of a standing full-body depiction of Alfonso XIII wearing the clothes of Grand Maester of the Order of Charles III and the collar of the Order of the Golden Fleece while holding a scepter with his left hand.

The discreet pasture chosen as location for the monument makes it easy for the latter to become a target for vandal attacks.

== Bibliography ==
Citations

Bibliography

- Fernández de Sevilla Morales, Miguel (1993). "Historia jurídico administrativa de la ciudad universitaria de Madrid" (PDF). Journal of Iberian and Latin American Literary and Cultural Studies. ISBN 978-84-669-0240-3. ISSN 2327-4751.
- Gómez Moreno, Ángel (2015). "Sociedad, política y cultura en la España regeneracionista: el legado de Alfonso XIII" (PDF). Studia Iberica et Americana. 2 (2). Fullerton, CA: California State University–Fullerton. Archived from the original (PDF) on 2021-10-20.
- Portela Sandoval, Francisco José (2001). "Pintura de los siglos XIX y XX. Escultura, orfebrería, mobiliario". Patrimonio artístico de la Universidad Complutense de Madrid. Madrid: Editorial Complutense. pp. 29–46. ISBN 8489784736.
