= Borders of France =

Political boundaries between France and neighboring territories

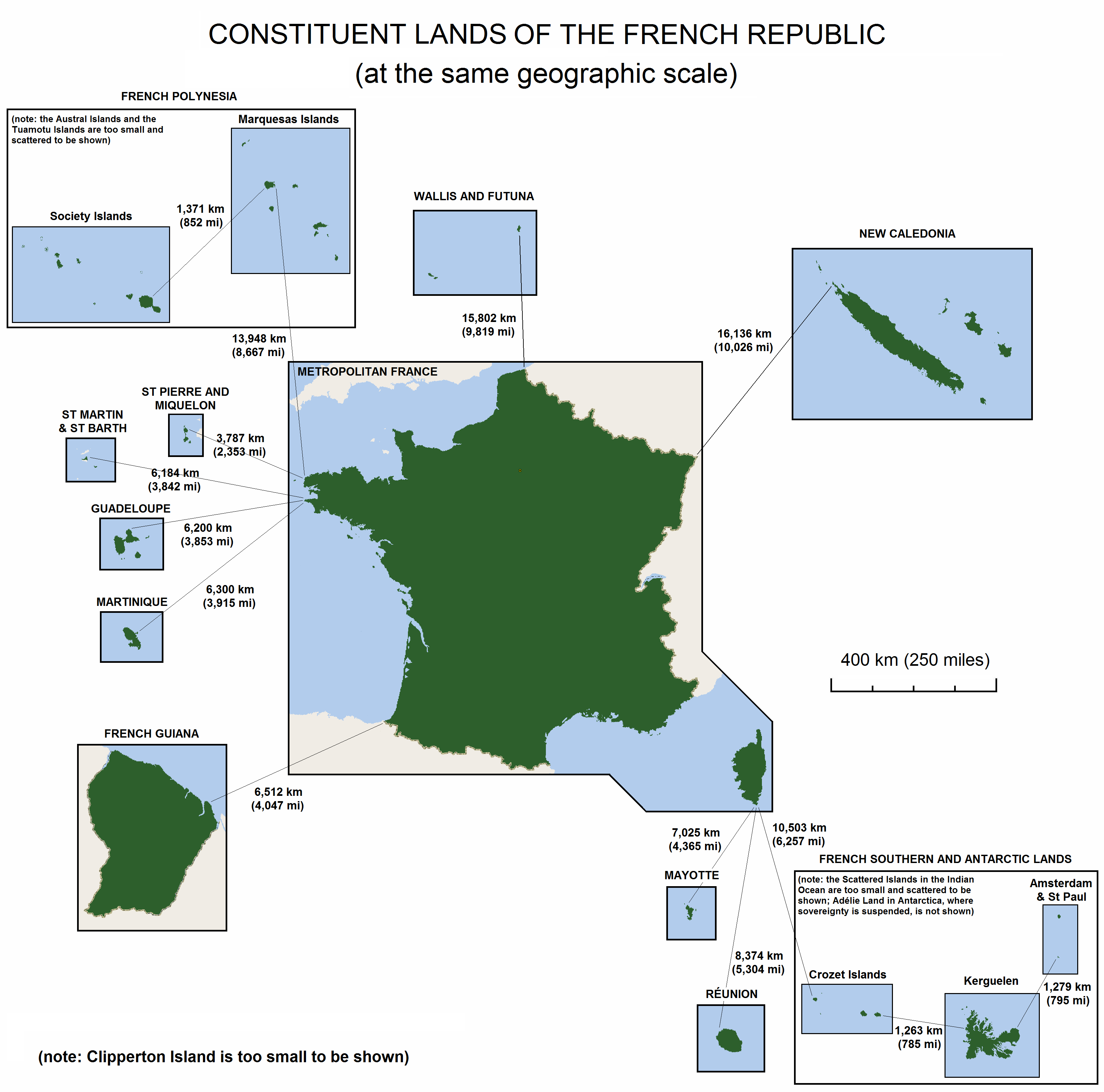
France and its territories

The French Republic has terrestrial borders with 10 sovereign states, 8 bordering Metropolitan France and 2 bordering the Overseas Departments of France, totaling 3,959 kilometres (2,460 mi). In addition, the territories of France border an additional 5 countries and territories.

== List ==
The lengths of the borders France shares with different countries and territories are listed below. Maritime borders are not all included.

=== Metropolitan France ===
Country	Length	Bordering regions
Belgium	556 km 345 mi	Hauts-de-France; Grand Est
Luxembourg	69 km 43 mi	Grand Est
Germany	418 km 260 mi	Grand Est
Switzerland	525 km 326 mi	Bourgogne-Franche-Comté; Auvergne-Rhône-Alpes; Grand Est
Italy	476 km 296 mi	Auvergne-Rhône-Alpes; Provence-Alpes-Côte d'Azur
Monaco	6 km 4 mi	Provence-Alpes-Côte d'Azur
Spain	646 km 401 mi	Nouvelle-Aquitaine; Occitanie
Andorra	55 km 34 mi	Occitanie
Total	2,751 km 1,709 mi	

=== Overseas departments ===
Country	Length	Bordering regions
Suriname	556 km 345 mi	French Guiana
Brazil	730 km 454 mi	French Guiana
Total	1,221 km 759 mi	

=== Overseas collectives and territories ===
Country	Length	Bordering Collective/Territory
Kingdom of The Netherlands	16 km 10 mi	Saint-Martin
Ross Dependency (New Zealand)	N/A	French Southern and Antarctic Lands
British Antarctic Territory (U.K.)	N/A	French Southern and Antarctic Lands
Australian Antarctic Territory (Australia)	N/A	French Southern and Antarctic Lands
Queen Maud Land (Norway)	N/A	French Southern and Antarctic Lands
Canada	N/A	Saint Pierre and Miquelon

== See also ==
- Exclusive economic zone of France
- Treaties of Good Correspondence
