= Roncal – Erronkari =

Town and municipality in northern Spain

Roncal Erronkari
- Municipality
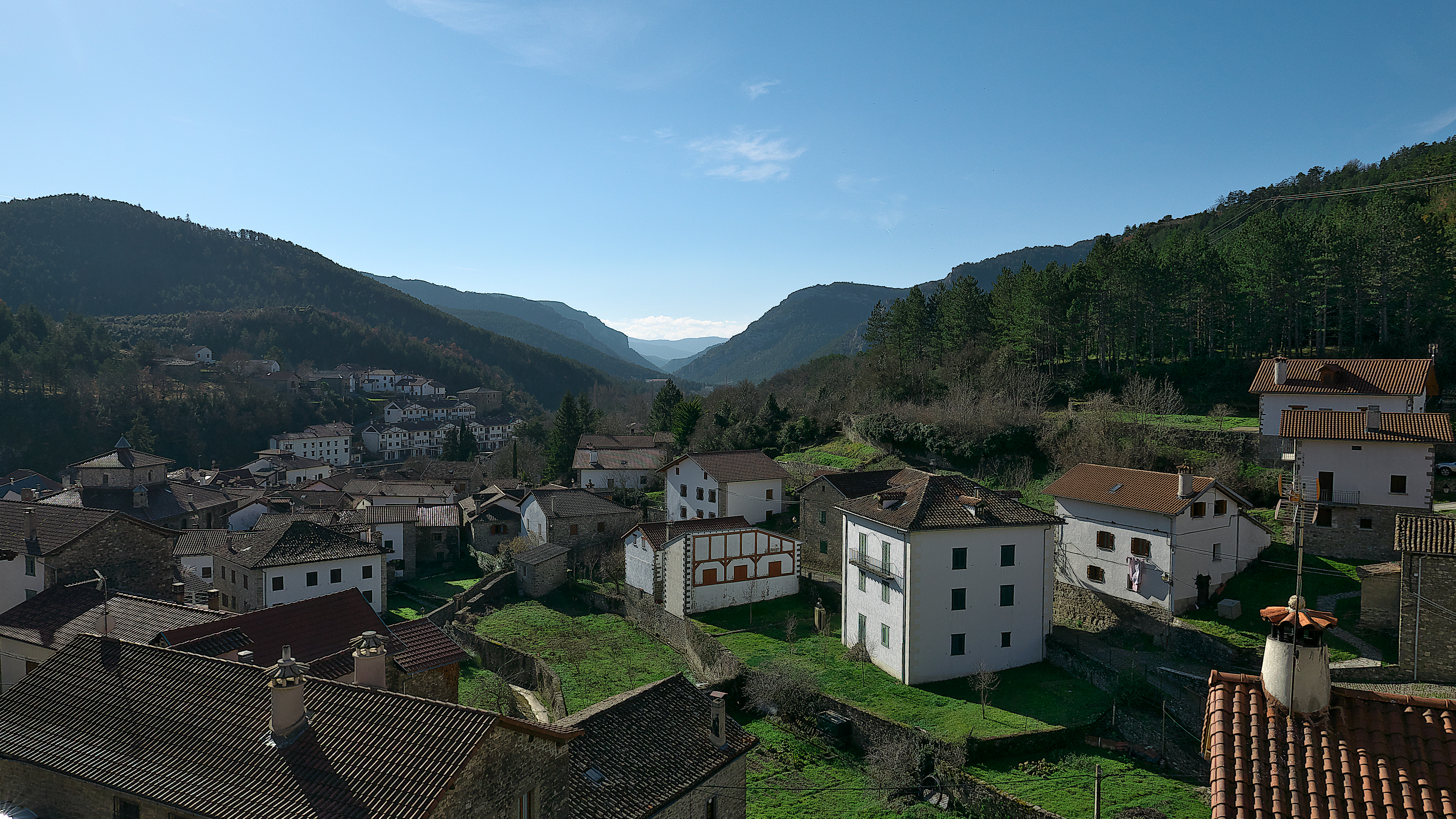

- Flag Coat of arms

- Location of Roncal – Erronkari within Navarre Location of Roncal – Erronkari within Spain
- Coordinates: 42°49′N 0°57′W
- Country: Spain
- Autonomous community: Navarre
- Comarca: Pirinioak

Government
  - Mayor: Alfredo Cabodevilla Munarriz

Area
  - Total: 38.80 km^{2} (14.98 sq mi)
- Elevation: 720 m (2,360 ft)

Population (2025-01-01)
  - Total: 206
  - Density: 5.31/km^{2} (13.8/sq mi)
- Time zone: UTC+1 (CET)
  - Summer (DST): UTC+2 (CEST)
- Postal code: 31415

Roncal – Erronkari is a town and municipality located in the province and autonomous community of Navarre, northern Spain. It is part of the Roncal Valley mancomunidad.

== Notable people ==
- Fructuoso Orduna (1893–1973), artist
