= Salvatierra de Esca =

Coordinates: 42°40′N 1°00′W

Salvatierra de Esca (Spanish) Salvatierra d'Esca (Aragonese)
- municipality
- Flag Coat of arms
- Interactive map of Salvatierra de Esca (Spanish)
- Country: Spain
- Autonomous community: Aragon
- Province: Zaragoza

Area
  - Total: 81 km^{2} (31 sq mi)

Population (2025-01-01)
  - Total: 187
  - Density: 2.3/km^{2} (6.0/sq mi)
- Time zone: UTC+1 (CET)
  - Summer (DST): UTC+2 (CEST)

Salvatierra de Esca (in Aragonese: Salvatierra d'Esca) is a municipality located in the province of Zaragoza, Aragon, Spain. According to the 2004 census (INE), the municipality has a population of 269 inhabitants.

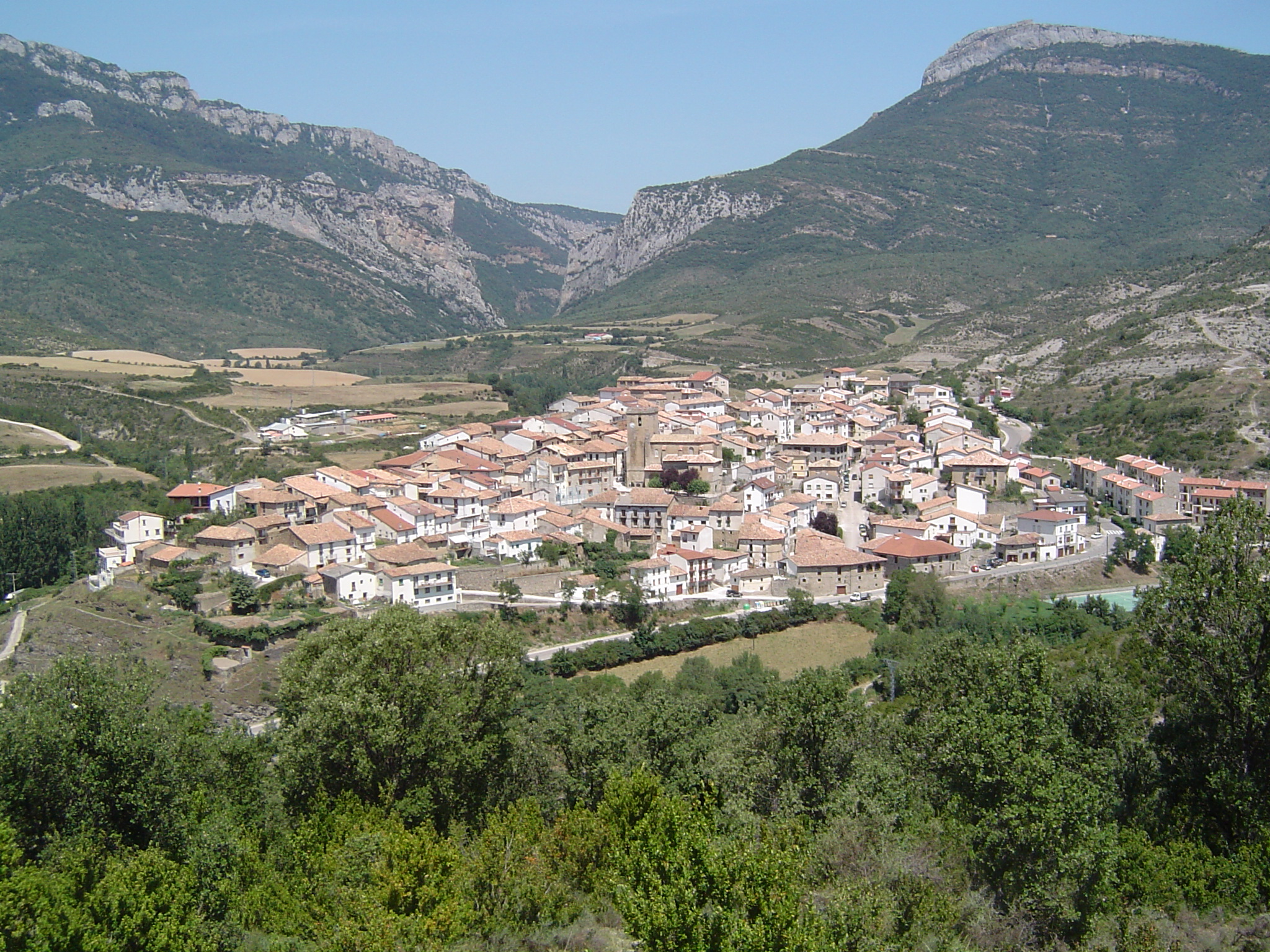
View of Salvatierra de Esca

== Villages ==
- Salvatierra de Esca
- Lorbés

== See also ==
- Esca (river)
