= Burgui-Burgi =

Town and municipality in northern Spain

Coordinates: 42°43′16″N 1°00′03″W

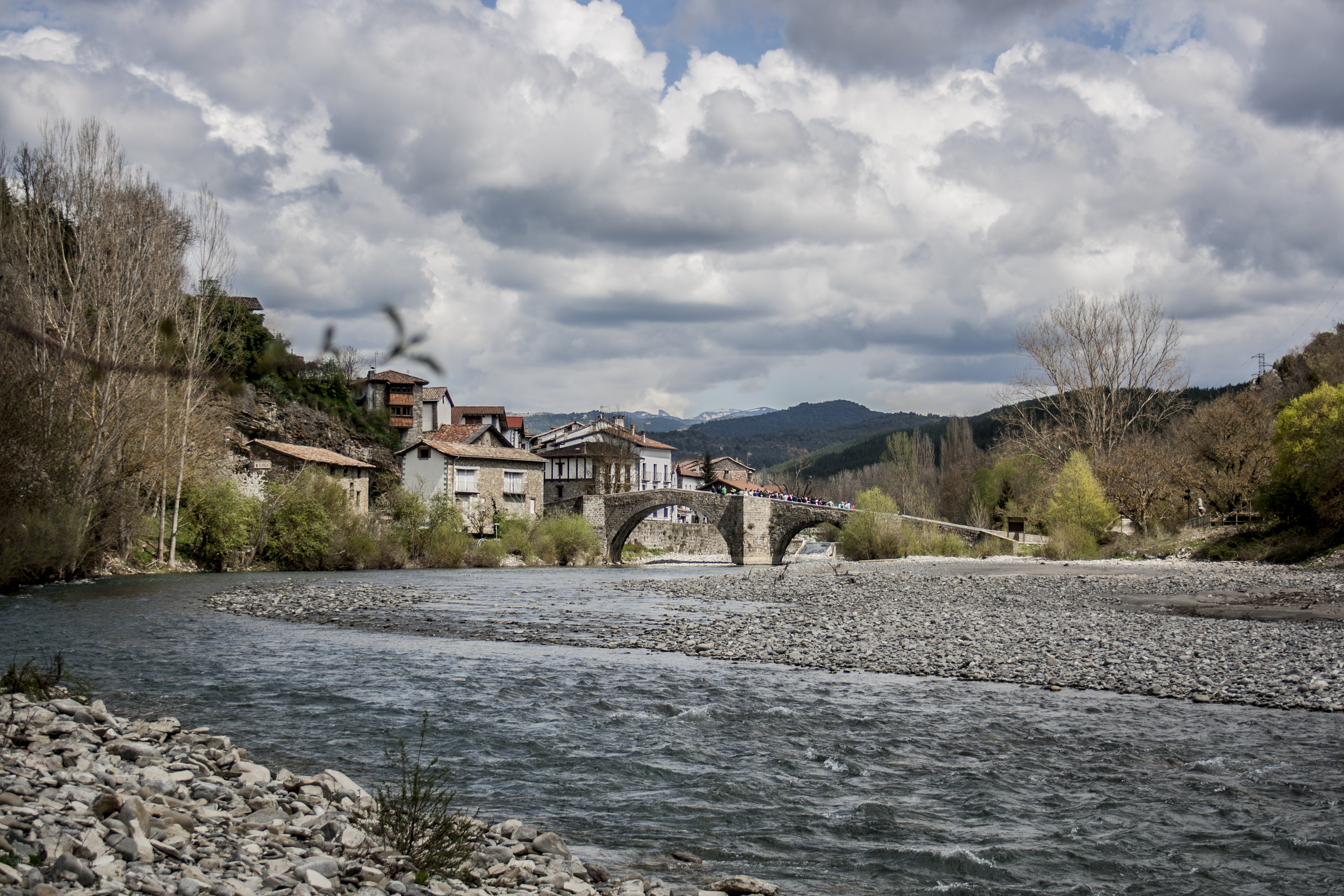
Bridge over the Esca river.

Burgui-Burgi's flag

Burgui-Burgi's coat of arms

Burgui – Burgi is a town and municipality located in the province of Navarre, in the autonomous community of Navarre, northern Spain.
