= Leja =

Leja is a surname. Notable people with this surname include:

- Franciszek Leja (1885–1975), Polish mathematician
- Frank Leja (1936–1991), U.S. baseball player
- Łukasz Leja, Polish-born American painter
- Walter Leja (1921–1992), Polish-born Canadian bomb disposal expert and soldier

== See also ==
- Lajat (alternatively spelled Leja), largest lava field in Syria
