= Fructuoso Orduna =

Spanish artist

Fructuoso Orduna y Lafuente (1893–1973) was a Spanish artist. He was born in Roncal, Navarre, on January 23, 1893 and died in Madrid on August 28, 1973. He was renowned as a sculptor of "urban sculpture" and won several awards for his outstanding work.

== Career ==
While he lived in Pamplona he obtained the assistance Floral of the Provincial Council moving to Madrid to perfect his skills with the sculptor, Mariano Benlliure. Between 1917 and 1922 he strengthened his training in Rome, sponsored by a grant from the same council. In 1962 he was named Fellow of Fine Arts in Madrid where he resided permanently. Years later he became the beloved Son of Roncal.

== Sculptures ==
- Monument to Pedro Navarro, Count of Oliveto, 1928, Garde, Navarre
- Monument to General José Sanjurjo, 1929, Navas de Tolosa Street, Pamplona
- Monument to José María Méndez Vigo, 1929, Paseo de Invierno, Tudela, Navarre (placa)
- Gable of the Provincial Council, 1932, façade of the Foral Provincial Council Palace, Pamplona
- Monument to Juan Huarte de San Juan, 1933, la Baja Navarra Avenue, Pamplona (placa)
- Monument to Valentín Gayarre, 1938, next to the local cemetery, Rocal, Navarre
- Monument to Julián Gayarre, 1950, La Taconera gardens, Pamplona
- Huesca, 1950. Image of Our Lord Jesus of Nazareth, for the Huesca Brotherhood of Veterans and former prisoners of Our Lord Jesus of Nazareth.
- "Navarra", 1951, façade of the Foral Provincial Council Palace, Pamplona
- "Reyes de Navarra", 1952, façade of the Foral Provincial Council Palace, Pamplona
- Monument to Julián Gayarre, 1953, Roncal, Navarre
- Huesca, 1955. Image of the Immaculate Conception, for the Excmo. Huesca City Council.
- Monument to César Borgia, 1965, Viana, Navarre
- Monument to San Francisco Javier, 1967, Javier, Navarre
- Monument to the Duke of Ahumada, 1969, Galicia Avenue, Pamplona
- Monument to Alfonso XIII, s/f, University City, Madrid
- Commemorative Plaque of Julián Gayarre, 1923, Casa Natal, Gayarre Museum, Roncal, Navarre
- Sepulchre of Hilarión Eslava, 1929, Burlada cemetery, Burlada, Navarre

== Distinctions ==
- Third Place Medal in the National Fine Arts Exposition (1920)
- First Place Medal in the National Fine Arts Exposition with the work "Post nubila Phoebus" (1922)
- Elected Fellow of the Royal Fine Arts (1963)
