= Urzainqui – Urzainki =

Coordinates: 42°50′N 0°57′W

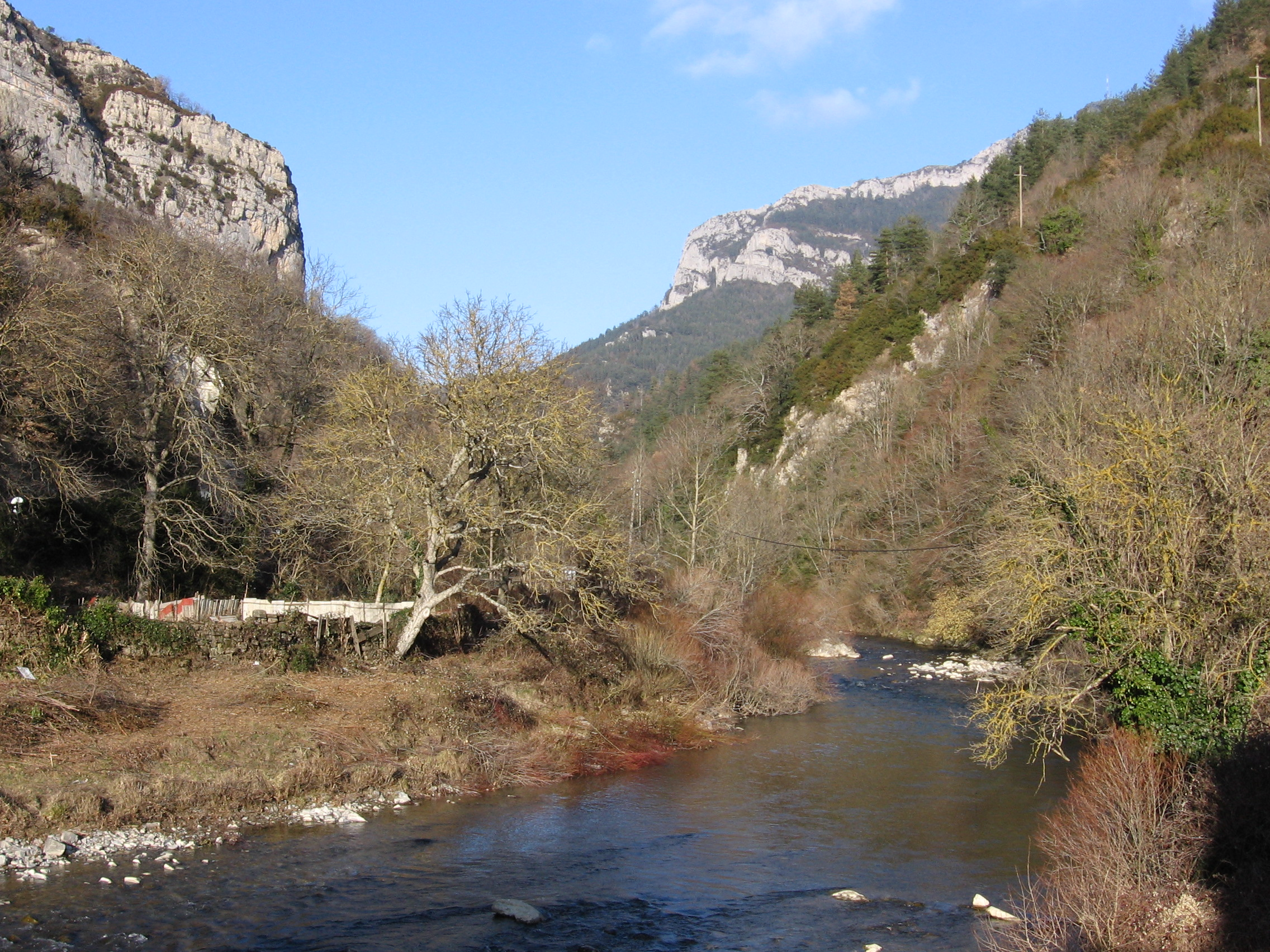
- Eska river in the Roncal valley, Urzainqui, Navarre, Spain

- Coat of arms

- Map of Navarre

Urzainqui is a town and municipality located in the province and autonomous community of Navarre, northern Spain. According to the 2017 census, there are 85 inhabitants in the area.
