= Vidángoz – Bidankoze =

Town and municipality in Navarre, Spain

Coordinates: 42.8°N 1°W

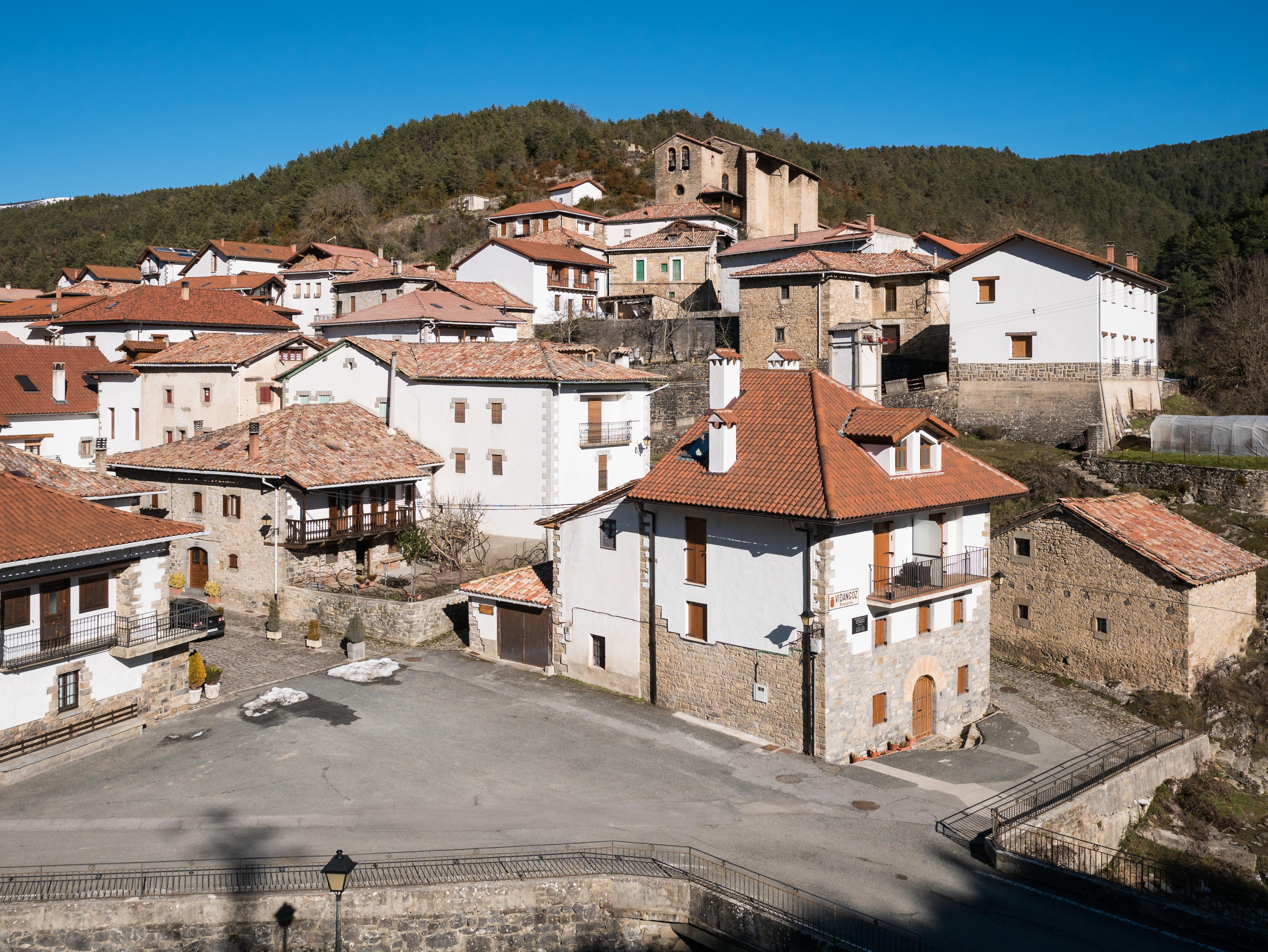
View of Vidángoz

Vidángoz – Bidankoze is a town and municipality located in the province and autonomous community of Navarre, northern Spain.
