= Mancomunidad =

Voluntary association of Spanish municipalities

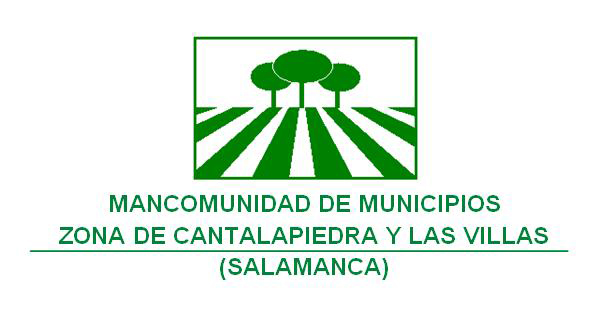
Logo of the Mancomunidad of Cantalapiedra y Las Villas, Province of Salamanca, Spain.

In present-day Spain, a mancomunidad (English: municipal association (Note: Aragonese: mancomunidat; Asturian: mancomunidá; Catalan: mancomunitat; Galician: mancomunidade; Basque: mankomunitatea)) is an association of municipalities voluntarily established by some municipalities with the aim of carrying out joint projects or providing common services.

A mancomunidad is one of the local entities defined for the purpose of local government, to which those municipalities may voluntarily delegate some of their functions and powers. There were 1,023 mancomunidades in 2011.

== Purpose ==
In general, mancomunidades are aimed at carrying out projects or providing common services.

A mancomunidad has legal personality, and can exist either for a particular period to achieve a concrete goal or can exist indefinitely.

A mancomunidad is similar to a comarca, with the difference that comarca has somewhat different meanings in the various autonomous communities of Spain and mancomunidad is defined identically throughout the country. The municipalities in a single mancomunidad need not be coterminous (though they usually are). They are required to set a clear goal, create management bodies distinct from those of the individual municipalities, and provide the mancomunidad with its own budget.

There are a number of historical or natural regions that, despite the strong identity and common goals of their inhabitants, are divided by provincial or even ancient kingdom boundaries. Examples of such regions are Tierra de Campos, Manchuela and Ilercavonia. Such regions or comarcas have often not been able to achieve the necessary legal recognition for their administrative development within the existing provincial or autonomous frameworks. Therefore, their municipalities have resorted to organizing themselves into a mancomunidad.

Other groups of municipalities that do not face the problem of borders cutting across their natural region or comarca may form a mancomunidad for economic reasons, to improve local services or in order alleviate some form of historical administrative neglect owing to distance from and lack of communication with current administrative centers.

== Other uses ==
The term mancomunidad and its cognates are also used to translate the English word "commonwealth".

== Bibliography ==
- Colino, César; del Pino, Eloísa (2010). "Spain: The consolidation of strong regional governments and the limits of local decentralisation". In Hendriks, Frank; Lidström, Anders; Loughlin, John (eds.). The Oxford Handbook of Subnational Democracy in Europe. Oxford University Press. pp. 356–383. doi:10.1093/oxfordhb/9780199562978.001.0001. ISBN 978-0199562978.
- "Local Government Act, Organic Law 7/1985" (in Spanish). Agencia Estatal Boletín Oficial del Estado. 1985.
- Cools, Marc; Verbeek, Leen (19–21 March 2013). Local and regional democracy in Spain. Council of Europe.
- Spanish Ministry of Economic Affairs and Digital Transformation. "Register of Local Entities". Local Entity Portal (in Spanish).
