= Uztárroz – Uztarrotze =

Coordinates: 42.893°N 0.939°W

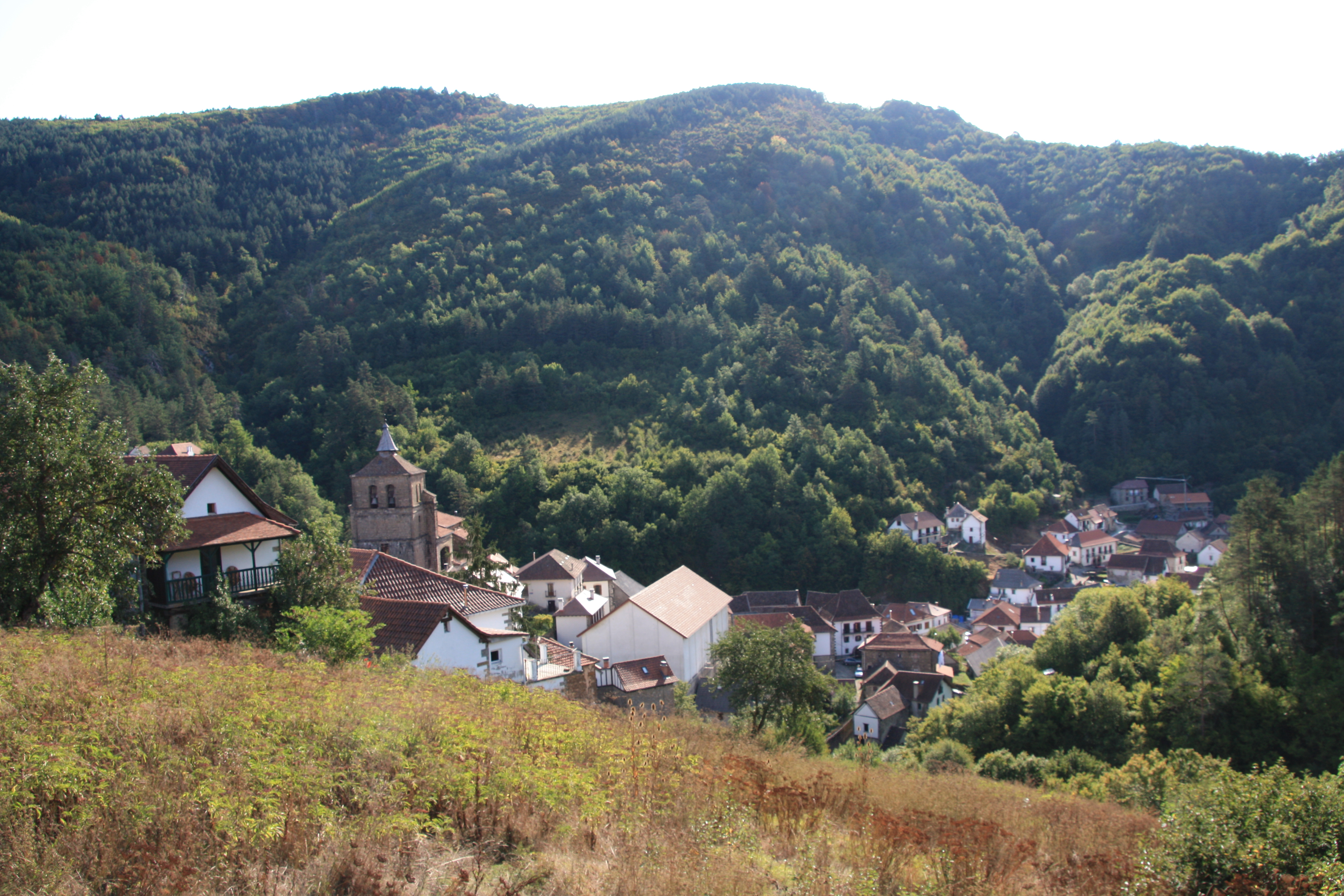
- View of Uztarroz

- Coat of arms

- Map of Uztárroz

Uztárroz – Uztarroze is a town and municipality located in the province and autonomous community of Navarre, northern Spain. According to the 2017 census, it had a population of 146.
