= Isaba =

Town and municipality in northern Spain

Coordinates: 42°52′N 0°55′W

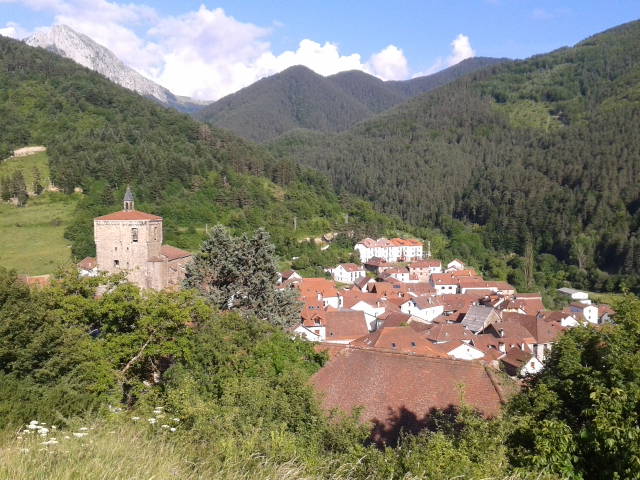
View of Isaba

Isaba (Basque: Izaba) is a town and municipality located in the province and autonomous community of Navarre, northern Spain. Is the main town of the Roncal valley and is sited in the Pyrenees of the autonomous Region.
