= Basque grammar =

Grammar of the Basque language

This article provides a sketch of Basque grammar. Basque (Euskara) is the language of the Basque people of the Basque Country (Euskal Herria), which borders the Bay of Biscay in Western Europe.

== Noun phrases ==
The Basque noun phrase is structured quite differently from those in most Indo-European languages.

=== Articles, determiners and quantifiers ===
Determiners and quantifiers play a central role in Basque noun phrase structure. Articles are best treated as a subset of the determiners.

Common determiners and quantifiers
Some determiners			Some quantifiers	
-a, -a(r)- singular article; -ak, -e- plural article; -ok, -o- plural proximal article; -(r)ik negative-polar article	hau, hon- "this"; hauek, haue- "these"; hori, horr- "that"; horiek, horie- "those"; hura, har- "that" (distal); haiek, haie- "those" (distal)	zein "which"; zer, ze "what"; beste "other"	batzuk, batzue "some"; zenbait "some"; asko "many"; anitz "many"; gutxi "few"; guzti "all"; zenbat "how many"; hainbeste "so many"	bat "one", "a", "an"; bi "two"; hiru "three"; lau "four"; bost "five"; etc.
The "articles" take the form of suffixes. See the following description of their uses. The forms -a, -ak and -ok correspond to the absolutive case; in other cases, -a-, -ar-, -e- and -o- are used, followed by a case suffix. The negative-polar article, often called the partitive suffix, does not combine with case suffixes. When glossing examples below, these elements are referred to collectively as ART.	The demonstrative stems, like the articles and unlike other nominal elements, show irregular allomorphy between singular and plural and, in the singular, between the absolutive (hau, hori, hura) and other cases (hon-, horr-, har-). The same forms function both as demonstrative determiners and demonstrative pronouns.			

The articles -a, -ak, -ok, -ik and -rik, the demonstratives hau, hori and hura, and some of the quantifiers follow the noun they determine or quantify.

etxea
house-ART
"(the) house"

etxeak
house-ART
"(the) houses"

etxe hau
house this
"this house"

etxe horiek
house those
"those houses"

etxe bat
house one
"one/a house"

etxe batzuk
house some
"some houses"

Other determiners and quantifiers, including beste "other", the interrogatives, and numerals above one or two (depending on dialect), precede the noun.

zein etxe?
which house
"which house(s)?"

zenbat etxe?
how-many house
"how many houses?"

zenbait etxe
some house
"some houses"

hiru etxe
three house
"three houses"

bi etxe / etxe bi
two house / house two
"two houses"

A normal noun phrase with a common noun as head must contain exactly one determiner or exactly one quantifier but not both, as in the above examples. However, the numerals may co-occur with a determiner.

hiru etxeok
three house-ART
"these three houses", "those [nearby] three houses"

hiru etxe haiek
three house those
"those [distant] three houses"

zein hiru etxe?
which three house
"which three houses?"

The items beste "other" and guzti "all" do not fill the determiner or quantifier position and therefore require an article, determiner or quantifier.

beste etxea
other house-ART
"the other house"

beste etxe bat
other house one
"another house", "one other house"

etxe guztiak
house all-ART
"all houses", "all of the houses"

The article -a, -ak acts as the default determiner, obligatory with a common noun in the absence of another determiner or quantifier (even in citation forms in popular usage).

etxea
"house"

etxeak
"houses"

Nola esaten da euskaraz "house"? — "Etxea".
"How do you say 'house' in Basque? 'Etxea'."

The articles -ik and -rik, traditionally called a partitive suffix (cf. French de), replaces -a and -ak in negative-polar contexts, especially with indefinite noun phrases in negative sentences. It is never treated as grammatically plural.

etxerik
"any house", "any houses"

Ba al daukazu etxerik?
"Do you have a house?"

hemen ez dago etxerik
"there is no house here", "there are no houses here"

hemen ez daude etxerik
"there are no houses here"

A noun phrase with a proper noun or a pronoun as head usually does not contain either a determiner or a quantifier.

Andoni
"Anthony"

Tokio
"Tokyo"

Wikipedia
"Wikipedia"

ni
"I", "me"

nor?
"who?"

The absence of any determiner or quantifier from a common-noun–head noun phrase is not possible except in certain specific contexts, such as in certain types of predicate or in some adverbial expressions.

- Lehendakari izendatuko dute. 'They will appoint him (as) president.' [They will name him president.]
- Bilbora joan zen irakasle. 'He went to Bilbao (to work) as a teacher.' [He went to Bilbao teacher.]
- eskuz 'by hand' [hand (esku) + by (-z)]
- sutan 'on fire' [fire (su) + in (-tan)]

=== Genitive and adjectival constructions ===
A genitive noun phrase precedes its possessed head to express possessive or similar relationships.

- Koldoren etxea 'Koldo's house'
- nire etxea 'my house'
- basoko etxea 'house in ("of") the forest'

The possessed noun phrase retains the same determination and quantification features described above for noun phrases generally.

Koldoren etxeak
Koldo's house-ART
'Koldo's houses'

Koldoren etxe hori
Koldo's house that
'that house of Koldo's'

Koldoren etxe bat
Koldo's house one
'one house of Koldo's'

Koldoren zein etxe?
Koldo's which house
'which house of Koldo's'

The head noun of a possessed noun phrase may be omitted. In this case the article or other determiner is still retained, now attached to the genitival element.

Koldorena
Koldo's-ART
'Koldo's (e.g. house)'

Koldorenak
Koldo's-ART
'Koldo's (e.g. houses)'

Etxe hau Koldorena da.
house this Koldo's-ART is
'This house is Koldo's.'

Nireak gorriak dira.
my-ART red-ART are
'Mine are red.'

Noun phrases are turned into genitives by the addition of one of two genitive case suffixes, -(r)en or -ko (see below on declension suffixes).

- Koldo → Koldoren
- Paris → Parisko
- etxe-a 'house' → etxearen, etxeko (not interchangeable)

The genitive formation of personal pronouns is irregular.

- ni 'I, me' → nire 'my'

-Ko (or -go) can be suffixed to a wide range of other words and phrases, many of them adverbial in function, to form adjectival expressions which behave syntactically just as genitive phrases do.

atzoko lana
yesterday-ko work-ART
'yesterday's work'

hemengo etxeak
here-ko house-ART
'the houses here'

oinezko bidaia bat
foot-by-ko journey one
'a journey on foot'

Tokiorako bidaia bat
Tokyo-to-ko journey one
'a journey to Tokyo'

bi urteko haur hori
two year-ko child that
'that two-year-old child'

=== Adjectives ===
Lexical adjectives, in contrast to adjectival expressions (see above), immediately follow the head noun but precede any article, determiner or quantifier.

etxe gorri bat
house red one
'one red house'

etxe txikia
house small-ART
'(the) little house'

etxe zuriak
house white-ART
'(the) white houses'

nire etxe txikia
my house small-ART
'my little house'

When adjectives, adjectivals or genitives are used as predicates, they usually take the article (singular -a, plural -ak).

Etxe hau txikia da.
house this small-ART is
'This house is small.'

Etxe hauek txikiak dira.
house these small-ART are
'These houses are small.'

Ogi hau atzokoa da.
bread this yesterday-ko-ART is
'This bread is yesterday's.'

Etxe hau nirea da.
house this my-ART is
'This house is mine.'

=== Number ===
Basque has three numbers: singular, unmarked and plural. Unmarked appears in declension when it is not necessary to specify singular or plural, such as because it is a proper name or is next to a determiner or a quantifier. Plural markers occur in two parts of Basque grammar: in some pronouns, determiners and quantifiers and in argument indices on verbs (see Basque verbs). For nouns, it depends on how the article -a/-ak is considered: as an enclitic, nouns would be number-neutral, as a suffix, nouns would be three-numbered. An unarticled noun such as etxe rarely occurs alone and normally appears within a noun phrase containing either a determiner or a quantifier, its number is likely to be indicated by this element:

etxea	'house'	(singular because of -a)
etxeak	'houses'	(plural because of -ak)
etxe hau	'this house'	(singular because of hau)
etxe hauek	'these houses'	(plural because of hauek)
etxe bat	'one/a house'	(singular because of bat)
etxe batzuk	'some houses'	(plural because of batzuk)
hiru etxe	'three houses'	(plural because of hiru)

Transitive verbs add a suffix, for example -it-, when the object of the verb is plural.

osaba bat dut
uncle one I-have
'I have an uncle'

hiru osaba ditut
three uncles I-have
'I have three uncles'

Most determiners, including the article, have distinct singular and plural forms (the latter ending in a k in the absolutive case, cited here). Most quantifiers (except bat versus batzuk) do not show such morphological variation, but many (including the numerals above one, of course) have intrinsically plural lexical meanings.

Singular:

- -a (article)
- hau, hori, hura (demonstratives)
- bat (quantifier)

Plural:

- -ak, -ok (articles)
- hauek, horiek, haiek (demonstratives)
- batzuk (quantifier)
- bi, hiru, lau... (numerals)

Sometimes the grammatical number of a noun phrase can be deduced only from general context or from verbal indexing

- zein etxe? 'which house?' or 'which houses?'

or from the lexical or semantic noun type:

- zenbat esne? 'how much milk?' (esne is a mass noun)
- zenbat etxe? 'how many houses?' (etxe is a quantitative noun)

=== Pronouns and adverbs ===
==== Personal pronouns ====
Personal pronouns differentiate three persons and two numbers. Zu must once have been the second-person plural pronoun but is now only the polite singular, having partially displaced the original second-person singular pronoun hi, now a markedly familiar form of address. Zuek represents a repluralised derivative of zu and is now the only second-person plural pronoun.

Diachronic development of second-person pronouns
Reconstructed proto-system	Attested present-day system
hi 'you (singular)' zu 'you (plural)'	hi 'you (familiar singular)' zu 'you (polite singular)' zu-ek 'you (plural)'

The function of third-person personal pronouns may be filled by any of the demonstrative pronouns or their emphatic counterparts in ber-.

Personal pronouns
		Singular	Plural
1st person		ni 'I/me'	gu 'we/us'
2nd person	very familiar	hi 'you'	zuek 'you'
2nd person	polite or neutral	zu 'you'	zuek 'you'
3rd person		hau, hori, hura, bera 'he/him, she/her, it'	hauek, horiek, haiek, bera(ie)k, eurak... 'they/them'

Besides these ordinary personal pronouns, there are emphatic (or intensive) ones, whose forms vary considerably between dialects: the first-person singular is neu, nerau, neroni or nihaur.

==== Demonstrative pronouns ====
The demonstrative determiners (see above) may be used pronominally (as indeed can all the determiners except for the articles). There are also emphatic (intensive) demonstrative pronouns beginning with ber-.

Demonstrative pronouns
	proximal		medial		distal	
	singular	plural	singular	plural	singular	plural
Ordinary	hau	hauek	hori	horiek	hura	haiek
Intensive	berau	berauek	berori	beroriek	bera	beraiek

It has often been noted that in traditional usage (but less so among modern speakers), there is often an explicit correlation between the three degrees of proximity in the demonstrative forms and the grammatical persons, such that hau is made to correspond to ni, hori to hi/zu and so on. One manifestation of this (others lie beyond the scope of this sketch) is the now old-fashioned mode of addressing persons in social positions commanding special respect (such as a priest, for example) using third-person verb forms and, for the personal pronoun, the second-degree intensive demonstrative berori (see the above table).

==== Other pronouns and correlative adverbs ====
Other pronouns and deictic adverbs
	Pronouns	Place adverbs	Manner adverbs	Time adverbs
Demonstrative	(see above)	hemen 'here'; hor 'there (nearby)'; han 'there (distant)'	honela 'like this'; horrela 'like that'; hala 'like that, so'	orain 'now'; orduan 'then'
Interrogative	nor? 'who?'; zer? 'what?'; zein? 'which one?'	non? 'where?'	nola? 'how?'	noiz? 'when?'
Indefinite	norbait 'somebody'; zerbait 'something'	nonbait 'somewhere'	nolabait 'somehow'	noizbait 'sometime'
Negative polarity	inor 'anybody'; ezer 'anything'	inon 'anywhere'	inola 'any way, at all'	inoiz 'ever'

==== Further forms ====
- All the demonstrative pronouns and adverbs may be extended by the suffix -xe (-txe) which lends further emphasis: hauxe (this very thing), hementxe (exactly here), honelaxe (exactly in this way), oraintxe (right now).
- The pronouns can all be declined in any case (see below). The personal and demonstrative pronouns exhibit allomorphy between absolutive and non-zero cases. The adverbs can be adjectivalised by addition of -ko (-go), and some can also take other locative suffixes.
- There are two further series of indefinites, as illustrated by edonor, edonon... and nornahi, zernahi..., respectively; both series may be translated as 'whoever, wherever...' or 'anyone, anywhere...'.
- Negative pronouns and adverbs consist of the negative polarity series together with ez 'no' or as part of a negative sentence: inor ez 'nobody', Ez dut inor ezagutzen 'I don't know anybody' = 'I know nobody'.

=== Declension ===
==== Cases ====
Basque noun phrases are followed by a case suffix, which specifies the relation between the noun phrase and its clause (playing roughly the role of prepositions in English). The most basic cases are shown here, for convenience divided into three main groups: nuclear, local (or locative) and others.

Case suffixes are attached to whatever element (noun, adjective, determiner etc.) comes last in the noun phrase according to the rules already given. The different forms or "declensions" of each case suffix given in the following tables are selected in accordance with the nature of the nominal element to which the case ending is attached, as will be explained below.

Nuclear cases
Name	Meaning/Use	Forms ("declensions")			
Name	Meaning/Use	1	2	3	4
Absolutive	intransitive subject; transitive direct object	-a	-ak	—N/a	
Ergative	transitive subject	-ak	-ek	-(e)k	
Dative	recipient or affected: 'to', 'for', 'from'	-ari	-ei	-(r)i	

Local cases
Name	Meaning/Use	Forms ("declensions")			
Name	Meaning/Use	1	2	3	4
Inessive	place where/time when: 'in', 'at', 'on'	-(e)an	-etan	-(e)tan	-(e)n
Allative	where to: 'to'	-(e)ra	-etara	-(e)tara	-(r)a
Ablative	where from/through: 'from', 'since', 'through'	-(e)tik	-etatik	-(e)tatik	-tik/-dik
Terminative	up to what limit: 'up to'	-(e)raino	-etaraino	-(e)taraino	-(r)aino
Directive	towards what: 'towards'	-(e)rantz	-etarantz	-(e)tarantz	-(r)antz
Local genitive	pertaining to where/when: 'of', 'from'	-(e)ko	-etako	-(e)tako	-ko/-go

Other cases
Name	Meaning/Use	Forms ("declensions")			
Name	Meaning/Use	1	2	3	4
Possessive genitive	possessive/genitive: 'of', '-'s'	-aren	-en	-(r)en	
Instrumental	means or topic: 'by', 'of', 'about'	-az	-ez	-(e)z, -(e)taz	
Comitative	accompaniment or means: 'with'	-arekin	-ekin	-(r)ekin	
Benefactive	beneficiary: 'for'	-arentzat	-entzat	-(r)entzat	
Causal	cause, reason or value: 'because of', '(in exchange) for'	-a(ren)gatik	-engatik	-(r)engatik	

==== Sets of case forms ("declensions") ====
The four sets of forms, labelled 1 to 4 in the preceding tables, have the following uses and characteristics:

Set	Type	Comments	Examples
1	SINGULAR ARTICLE	Represent the combination of the singular article -a with the case suffixes. There is a formal absence of any trace of the -a- morpheme in the local cases, however. The -(e)- in the local cases occurs after consonants.	mendia, mendiak, mendiari, mendian, mendira... (mendi 'mountain'); zuhaitza, zuhaitzak, zuhaitzari, zuhaitzean, zuhaitzera... (zuhaitz 'tree')
2	PLURAL ARTICLE	Represent the combination of the plural article -ak with the case suffixes. Notice the pre-suffixal plural article allomorphs -eta- (in local cases) and -e- (elsewhere).	mendiak, mendiek, mendiei, mendietan, mendietara...; zuhaitzak, zuhaitzek, zuhaitzei, zuhaitzetan, zuhaitzetara...
3	NO ARTICLE	Used in the absence of an article: when another determiner or quantifier is employed (zein menditan? 'on which mountain?', zuhaitz askori 'to many trees') or occasionally when there is none at all (cf. oinez and sutan above). The -(e)- and -(r)-, shown with some suffixes, appear following consonants and vowels, respectively.	mendi, mendik, mendiri, menditan, menditara...; zuhaitz, zuhaitzek, zuhaitzi, zuhaitzetan, zuhaitzetara...
4	PROPER NOUNS	Used with proper nouns. They are identical to set 3 except in the local cases. This set contains the most basic form of each case suffix. The local forms -dik and -go are used after a voiced consonant except r.	Tokio, Tokiok, Tokiori, Tokion, Tokiora, Tokiotik, Tokioko...; Paris, Parisek, Parisi, Parisen, Parisa, Paristik, Parisko...; Dublin, Dublinek, Dublini, Dublinen, Dublina, Dublindik, Dublingo...

From the above, it may be deduced that the essential formal characteristics of the Basque cases are as shown in the following table:

Case morphemes
NUCLEAR
Absolutive	—N/a
Ergative	-k
Dative	-i
LOCAL
Inessive	-n
Allative	-(r)a
Ablative	-tik
Local genitive	-ko
OTHER
Possessive genitive	-en
Instrumental	-z
Comitative	-ekin
Benefactive	-en-tzat
Cause etc.	-en-gatik

==== Declension of personal pronouns, demonstratives and bat, batzuk ====
For the most part, the application of the suffixes to any word in the language is highly regular. In this section are the main exceptions:

Personal pronouns and demonstratives display some irregularities in declension. The personal pronouns ni, hi, gu, zu form their possessive genitive by adding -re rather than -ren: nire, hire, gure, zure. They are the pronominal possessives:

Pronominal possessives
Singular	Plural
nire 'my' hire 'your (very familiar)' zure 'your (polite or neutral)' haren, beraren 'his, her, its' bere 'his, her, its (reflexive)'	gure 'our' zuen 'your' haien, beraien 'their' beren 'their (reflexive)'

As has been seen, the demonstratives each have three stems: one for the absolutive singular (hau, hori, hura), another for all other singular cases (hon-, horr-, har-), and one for the plural, all cases (haue-, horie-, haie-). In the plural, they take a -k suffix in the absolutive, as does batzuk 'some').

Demonstratives and bat 'one', batzuk 'some'
Singular absolutive	Singular other	Plural absolutive	Plural other
hau 'this' hori 'that' hura 'that (distant)' bat 'one, a'	honek, honi, honetan... horrek, horri, horretan... hark, hari, hartan... batek, bati, batean...	hauek horiek haiek batzuk 'some'	hauek, hauei, hauetan... horiek, horiei, horietan... haiek, haiei, haietan... batzuek, batzuei, batzuetan...

==== Animate local cases ====
As a rule, the local case suffixes given above are not used directly with noun phrases that refer to a person or an animal (called animate noun phrases). An inessive, allative or ablative relation affecting such noun phrases may be expressed by using the suffixes inessive -gan, allative -gana, and ablative -gandik, affixed to either the possessive genitive or the absolutive: nigan 'in me', irakaslearengana 'to(wards) the teacher' (irakasle 'teacher'), zaldiengandik 'from the horses' (zaldi 'horse'), haur horrengandik 'from that child', Koldorengana 'to(wards) Koldo'.

==== Compound case forms ====
In addition to the basic case forms given above, further forms are found derived from them through the addition of further suffixes or extensions. Some of the additional forms provide for the expression of more nuanced relations; others have the same or similar meanings to the basic forms, with which they merely contrast stylistically or dialectally:

Some compound cases
Basic case	Compound cases
ALLATIVE: -ra 'to'	-rat 'to, towards'; -rantz 'towards'; -raino 'as far as'; -rako 'for'
ABLATIVE: -tik 'from'	-tikan same meaning
COMITATIVE: -ekin 'with'	-ekila(n) same meaning; -ekiko 'in relation to'
BENEFACTIVE: -entzat 'for'	-entzako same meaning

==== Adjectival -ko ====
The -ko suffix (see above) may be added to some case forms to make their syntactic function adjectival.

Examples of adjectival -ko after case suffixes
Case	Primary use	Adjectival use
Allative	Errepide honek Bilbora darama. 'This road leads to Bilbao.'	Bilborako errepidea berria da. 'The Bilbao road (= road to Bilbao) is new.'; Bilbo-ra-ko; Bilbao-to-ko
Instrumental	Liburu hau euskaraz dago. 'This book is in Basque.'	Badauzkate euskarazko liburuak. 'They have Basque-language books (= books in Basque).'; euskara-z-ko Basque-INSTR-ko
Benefactive	Liburu hori haurrentzat idatzi nuen. 'I wrote that book for children.'	Haurrentzako liburuak idazten ditut. 'I write children's books (= books for children).'; haurr-entza(t)-ko child-for.PL.ART-ko

Any such adjectivalised forms may be used without an overt head noun, then likely to appear with a suffixed article:

haurrentzakoa
child-for.PL.ART-ko-ART
'(the) one for (the) children'

haurrentzakoak
child-for.PL.ART-ko-PL.ART
'(the) ones for (the) children'

Such nominalised adjectival forms may further take case suffixes of their own:

haurrentzakoarekin
child-for.PL.ART-ko-with.ART
'with the one for children'

euskarazkoentzat
Basque-INSTR-ko-for.PL.ART
'for the ones in Basque'

While the potential to generate and understand (in a reasonable context) such complex forms is built into Basque grammar and perfectly intelligible to speakers, in practice, the use of such very complex constructions is not common.

==== Local cases with adverbs ====
The fourth set is local case suffixes (etymologically the primary forms) incorporated into the place adverbs, which gives these following (partly irregular) forms:

Place adverbs
		Demonstrative			Interrogative 'where?'
		'here'	'there (near)'	'there (distant)'	Interrogative 'where?'
Inessive	'here, there, where?'	hemen	hor	han	non
Allative	'to here, to there, where to?'	hona	horra	hara	nora
Ablative	'from here/there, where from?', 'this/that way, which way?'	hemendik	hortik	handik	nondik
Genitive	'pertaining to here/there/where?'	hemengo	horko	hango	nongo

Many other adverbs may be adjectivalised with -ko. Some may take certain other case suffixes (usually from set 4), particularly ablative -tik/-dik: atzotik 'since yesterday', urrundik 'from far away'.

=== Postpositions ===
Basque postpositions are items of sufficient lexical substance and grammatical autonomy to be treated as separate words (unlike the case suffixes) and specifying relations. They are so called because they follow the word or phrase whose relation they express (compare prepositions, which precede a word or phrase, but do not exist in Basque).

Most Basque postpositions require the complement after which they are placed to adopt a particular case form (such postpositions are sometimes said to govern a certain case). Postpositions in Basque furthermore often take a case suffix (or may take several different case suffixes) themselves. An English compound preposition is on top of, of being comparable to the case taken by a Basque noun preceding a postposition (in this case it would be the genitive) and on is like the case suffix (inessive, in this case) taken by the postposition (to which top corresponds). The examples on the right show how Basque expresses on top of and a few other postpositional notions.

harriaren gainean
stone-GEN top-INE
of.the.stone on.top
'on top of the stone'

legearen arabera
law-GEN rule-ALL
of.the.law to.the.rule
'according to the law'

euriari esker
rain-DAT thank
to.the.rain thank(s)
'on account of the rain'

diruari dagokionez
money-DAT as-it-is-to-it
'as regards money'

The most typical Basque postpositions are built on nominal structures: -aren gainean 'on top of' centres on the word gain 'top', but not all postpositional nuclei consist of nouns that can be used independently of the postpositional construction in which they participate.

One subset of postpositions that express spatial relationships (again exemplified by gainean) have a lexical stem whose syntactic behaviour is roughly noun-like but is limited to a much narrower range of possible patterns (in the grammars of some non-European languages such elements are called relational nouns or relationals). Here are some Basque relationals:

Some relationals
arte- 'between, among'; atze- 'behind, rear'; aurre- '(in) front'; azpi- 'below, underside'; barru- 'inside'	erdi- 'middle'; gain- '(on) top, above'; inguru- 'around'; ondo- 'next to, beside'

Typical Basque relationals can enter into two possible relations with the preceding (governed) complement: firstly, the complement can be a noun phrase in a possessive genitive relation:

mendiaren gainean
of.the.mountain on.top
'on top of the mountain'

mendien gainean
of.the.mountains on.top
'on top of the mountains'

mendi txiki honen gainean
mountain small of.this on.top
'on top of this small mountain'

nire gainean
of.me/my on.top
'on (top of) me'

secondly, the complement can be an unsuffixed noun (not a noun phrase) in a relation resembling a lexical compound:

mendi gainean
mountain on.top
'on top of the mountain, on the mountain top'

In these examples, the relational (gain-) takes the set 1 (singular) inessive case suffix (-(e)an), as in mendiaren gainean and these further examples,

mahai(aren) azpian
(of.the).table at.bottom
'under the table'

etxe(aren) barruan
(of.the).house at.inside
'inside the house'

begien erdian
of.the.eyes in.middle
'between the eyes'

but other local case suffixes (glossed in capitals) may occur instead of the inessive as sense or usage conventions require, for example,

etxe(aren) barrura
(of.the).house TO.inside
'into the house'

nire atzetik
of.me/my FROM/THROUGH.back
'behind me, following me'

mendi(aren) gaineko gurutzea
(of.the).mountain {OF/PERTAINING TO.top} the.cross
'the cross on top of the mountain'

The relationals are often used in an adverbial function without a preceding complement (thus not as postpositions):

- barruan dago 'he/she/it is inside' [at.inside]
- barrura doa 'he/she/it is going inside' [to.inside]
- Aurrera! 'Forwards! Onwards!' [to.front]
- atzetik aurrera 'backwards, back-to-front' [from.back to.front]

There are a few relationals, such as kanpo- 'outside', goi- 'up' and behe- 'down', that cannot be preceded by a complement of the kind described but have an adverbial uses resembling them: Kanpora noa 'I'm going outside', Goian dago 'It is above', etc. The irregular allative of goi is gora 'up(wards)'.

=== Comparison ===
In English, the comparative and superlative of many adjectives and adverbs are formed by adding the suffixes -er and -est respectively (from big, for example, bigger and biggest are formed). Basque adjectives and adverbs similarly take such suffixes, but there are three morphologically derived degrees of comparison. From handi 'big' is handiago 'bigger', handien(a) '(the) biggest' (where -a is the article) and handiegi 'too big':

Comparison suffixes
- COMPARATIVE: -ago '-er, more...'
- SUPERLATIVE: -en(a) '(the) -est, most...'
- EXCESSIVE: -egi 'too...'

Comparative, superlative and excessive adjectives may be used in the same syntactic frames as adjectives in the positive (basic) degree: compare mendi altuak 'high mountains' [mountain high.PLURAL.ART] and mendi altuagoak 'higher mountains' [mountain higher.PLURAL.ART]. The noun preceding a superlative often takes the partitive suffix -(r)ik, either mendi altuenak or mendirik altuenak 'the highest mountains' is possible.

Occasionally, such suffixes may be added to other word forms: from gora 'up' (irregular allative of the relational goi-, hence literally 'to above') can be formed gorago (for gora + -ago), 'more up', i.e. 'higher'. Just as English has a few irregular forms of comparison such as better and best (from good or well), so does Basque: on 'good' but hobe 'better'. Other ways of comparing quality or manner, in both Basque and English, involve using a separate word, such as hain handi 'so big'.

Special words are used to compare quantities (how much or how many of something), such as gehiago 'more', gehien(a) '(the) most', gehiegi 'too much, too many'. They follow the noun quantified: liburu gehiago 'more books', gatz gehiegi 'too much salt', and hainbeste 'so much, so many', which precedes the noun: hainbeste diru 'so much money'. All of them can also be used adverbially (comparing the extent to which something occurs or is the case): Ez pentsatu hainbeste! 'Don't think so much!'.

Comparisons may involve reference to a standard (of comparison): compare English is easier (no standard mentioned) to English is easier than Basque (there, Basque is referred to as the standard of comparison). English puts the word than in front of the standard. In Fish is as expensive as meat, meat is the standard, indicated by the second as (compare Fish is as expensive or Fish is so expensive, where no standard is mentioned). Comparisons of the as...as type are called equative. With superlatives, as in Donostia is the prettiest city in the Basque Country, on the other hand, the Basque Country is not really a standard but a domain or range within which the superlative applies. The structures used in such comparisons in Basque are as follows (the second table shows examples); the word orders shown are the most common and considered basic, but certain variations are also possible.

Comparison constructions
	Qualitative		Quantitative	
	Construction	Meaning	Construction	Meaning
Comparative	STANDARD baino COMPARATIVE	ADJ/ADV-er than STANDARD	STANDARD baino NOUN gehiago	more NOUN(s) than STANDARD
Superlative	DOMAIN-(e)ko NOUN-(r)ik SUPERLATIVE-a	the ADJ/ADV-est NOUN in the DOMAIN	DOMAIN-(e)ko NOUN-(r)ik gehienak	most NOUNs in the DOMAIN
Equative	STANDARD bezain ADJ/ADV	as ADJ/ADV as STANDARD	STANDARD adina NOUN	as much/many NOUN(s) as STANDARD

Examples of comparison constructions
		Example	Meaning
Comparative	Qualitative	Euskara ingelesa baino errazagoa da.	'Basque is easier than English.'
Comparative	Quantitative	Zuk nik baino diru gehiago daukazu.	'You've got more money than me.'
Superlative	Qualitative	Donostia Euskal Herriko hiririk politena da.	'Donostia is the prettiest city in the Basque Country.'
Superlative	Quantitative	Arabako lanposturik gehienak Gasteizen daude.	'Most of the jobs in Araba are in Gasteiz.'
Equative	Qualitative	Arraina haragia bezain garestia da.	'Fish is as expensive as meat.'
Equative	Quantitative	Zuk nik adina lagun dituzu.	'You have as many friends as I (do).'

== Verbs ==
Although several verbal categories are expressed morphologically, periphrastic tense formations predominate. Up to three arguments (subject, direct object and indirect object) can be indexed morphologically on single verb forms, and further sets of synthetic allocutive forms make for an even more complex morphology. The verb is also an area of the language subject to a fair amount of dialectal variation. Due to the complexity of this subject and its traditional centrality in descriptions of Basque grammar, it is the subject of a separate article.

== Syntax ==
=== Information structure ===
==== The focus rule and the topic rule ====
Basque word order is largely determined by the notions of focus and topic which are employed to decide how to "package" or structure the propositional content (information) in utterances. Focus is a feature that attaches to a part of a sentence considered to contain the most important information, the "point" of the utterance. Thus in different discourse contexts, the focus of the same (basic) sentence can be on different parts, giving rise (in a language like Basque) to different grammatical forms. Topic, on the other hand, refers to a part of a sentence that serves to put the information it contains into context, i.e. to establish "what we are talking about". Basque word order involves in a very basic two way rules, the "focus rule" and the "topic rule", as follows:

- Focus rule: Whichever constituent of a sentence is in focus immediately precedes the verb.
- Topic rule: A topic is emphasised by placing it at the beginning of the sentence.

Compare, for example:

Txakurrek hezurrak jaten dituzte.
dog.PL.ART.ERG bone.PL.ART eat.IMPERF AUX
'Dogs eat bones.'

- Topic: Txakurrek 'dogs'
- Focus: hezurrak 'bones'
- Verb: jaten dituzte '(they) eat (them)'

Hezurrak txakurrek jaten dituzte.
bone.PL.ART dog.PL.ART.ERG eat.IMPERF AUX
'Dogs eat bones,' 'Bones are eaten by dogs,' 'It is dogs who eat bones.'

- Topic: Hezurrak 'bones'
- Focus: txakurrek 'dogs'
- Verb: jaten dituzte '(they) eat (them)'

Basque is sometimes called an SOV (i.e. subject–object–verb) language, but as one can see, the order of elements in the Basque sentence is not rigidly determined by grammatical roles (such as subject and object) and has to do with other criteria (such as focus and topic). In Basque the SOV is more common and less marked than the OSV order, although each is appropriate in different contexts (as are other word orders). That is to say, it is more common and less marked (other things being equal) for the subject to be topic and for the object to be in focus than vice versa. This may be explained by intrinsic qualities of the concepts "subject" and "object". It is compatible with the cross-linguistic tendency for topichood to be a characteristic feature of prototypical subjects, for example.

==== Verbal focus ====
A possibility seemingly not taken into account by the above focus rule, which states that the focused element precedes the verb, is the circumstance wherein the verb itself is in focus. One situation in which this occurs is a clause with no (or no focused) non-verbal constituents, only perhaps a topic-subject, as in 'He knows' or 'John is coming' (in contexts where 'he' or 'John' are not focused). Of course there may be other constituents, as long as none of them are focused, e.g. 'She has money' (where the point of the utterance is not to tell us what she has, but whether or not she has it). This type of sentence is sometimes described as one in which what is in focus is not so much the verb as the affirmation of the predicate; i.e. 'She has money' does not really stand in contrast to, say, 'She eats money', but only to 'She doesn't have money'. For the present practical purpose this distinction may be ignored and the term "verbal focus" will be applied to such cases.

The most notable verb-focusing strategy in Basque grammar is use of the affirmative prefix ba-. Attached to a synthetically conjugated finite verb, this has the effect of putting that verb (or its affirmation, if one prefers) in focus, thereby implying that whatever (if anything) precedes the verb is not in focus. Thus the use of ba- looks as if it blocks application of the general focus rule which assigns focus to an element in pre-verbal position.

Berak daki.
he.ERG (he).knows.(it)
'He knows,' 'He's the one who knows.'

- Focus: berak 'he'
- Verb: daki '(he) knows (it)'

Badaki.
ba-(he).knows.(it)
'He knows.'

- Verb/Focus: (ba)daki '(he) knows (it)'

Berak badaki. (or: Badaki berak.)

'(As for) him, he knows,' 'He knows, (he does).'

- Topic: Berak 'he'
- Verb/Focus: (ba)daki '(he) knows (it)'

The affirmative use of ba- (not to confused with the homophonous subordinating prefix meaning 'if') is normally used with synthetic finite forms, thus also John badator or Badator John 'John is coming' (as opposed to John dator 'John is coming'), Badu dirua (or in western Basque Badauka dirua) 'She has money'. In most varieties of Basque, however, affirmative ba- is not so common with compound tenses or compound verbs.

To place a compound verb form (or its affirmation) in focus, it may be enough to place the main sentence stress (which normally goes on the focused item) on the first component of the verbal compound expression. Here it seems that the auxiliary part of the expression is treated as representing the "verb" in the general focus rule, thereby predictably throwing the focus onto the preceding component, which is now the main verb. In western dialects an alternative procedure used to emphasise the placement of focus on the verb is to make this a complement of the verb egin 'do'.

Bérak ikusi du.

'He has seen it,' 'He's the one who has seen it.'

- Focus: berak 'he'
- Verb: ikusi du '(he) has seen (it)'

Ikúsi du.

'He has seen it (he has indeed!).'

- Verb/Focus: ikusi du '(he) has seen (it)'

BERAK ikúsi du. (or: Ikúsi du BERAK.)

'(As for) him, he has (indeed) seen it.'

- Topic: BERAK 'he'
- Verb/Focus: ikusi du '(he) has seen (it)'

Western Basque alternative:

(Berak) ikusi egin du.

==== Further observations on focus and topic ====
There are certain exceptions to the general focus rule:

"Heavy" constituents may be placed after an unfocused verb even when they are (pragmatically) focused.

- Atzo ikusi nuen asto bat betaurrekoekin. 'Yesterday I saw a donkey with (i.e. wearing) glasses.'

Imperative verbs often precede other constituents (except for topics).

- Ekarri hona bi botila ardo mesedez! 'Bring two bottles of wine here please!'
- Bihar arratsaldean, zatoz nire etxera. 'Tomorrow afternoon, come to my house.'

Some subordinate clauses are exempt from certain rules. For example, an unfocused verb is allowed to occur without any focused clause constituent in such clauses.

- datorren astean 'next week' (lit. 'the week that is coming', 'the coming week')
- dakigunez 'as we know'

Systematic exceptions apart, focus assignment (as defined in the preceding sections) is an obligatory feature of Basque clauses. Because it is obligatory and automatic, such focus assignment need not be pragmatically marked and does not necessarily signify emphatic focusing or foregrounding. This observation is particularly applicable when focus is assigned in accordance with predictable or prototypical patterns, such as when the direct object takes the focus position in a transitive clause, or when the verb is formally focused in an intransitive clause.

In some varieties or styles of Basque, e.g. in poetic diction, one may achieve more emphatic focus (even on an object) by inverting the usual verb-auxiliary order: Txakurrek hezurrak dituzte jaten. In ordinary colloquial usage many speakers do not allow this, but some allow other such "inversions", e.g. with compound verbs (light-verb constructions), e.g. normal Irakaslearekin hitz egingo dut 'I'll speak to the teacher' (ordinary focus on irakaslearekin) versus more marked Irakaslearekin egingo dut hitz (emphatic focus on irakaslearekin).

A topic may be backgrounded (although arguably still remaining a topic) by placement at the end of a sentence rather than at the beginning, e.g. Hezurrak jaten dituzte txakurrek, roughly 'They eat bones, dogs'; so also Ez dakit, nik 'I don't know', where nik is no doubt a topic of sorts since if it weren't there would be no need to mention it at all (unmarked: Ez dakit).

==== Clause-initial verbs ====
Although the following restrictions on the placement of verbs within the clause are the outcome of the various rules already given, it may be useful to summarise those restrictions here.

A finite verb form (a synthetically conjugative verb or auxiliary) cannot stand in absolute clause-initial position unless:

1. it is preceded by affirmative (verb-focusing) ba-...
  Badakit. 'I know.'
2. it is preceded by negative ez (see below)...
  Ez dauka dirurik. 'She hasn't got any money.'
3. it is imperative (or optative)...
  Zatoz hona! 'Come here!'
  Datorrela bihar. 'Let him come tomorrow.'
4. certain subordinate clauses...
  datorren astean 'next week'

A compound verb form (a verb in a compound tense or a compound verb construction) may be clause-initial in cases of verbal focus:

- Ikusi (egin) du. 'He has seen it.'
- Maite nau. 'He loves me.'

=== Negation ===
Negation is expressed by ez preceding the finite verb form.

- John ez dator. (Or: Ez dator John.) 'John is not coming.'

If there is no finite verb in the clause, such as when the participle on its own is used as an imperative or in non-finite subordinate clauses, ez may precede a non-finite verb. (VN stands for verbal noun here.)

- Ez etorri! 'Do not come!'

Esan nion ez etortzeko.
say.PTCP AUX not come.VN-ko
'I told him not to come.'

There is a strong tendency for other sentence constituents to follow a negated finite verb, except when topicalised. Thus the general focus rule (see above) does not apply with negated finite verb forms (in the same way as it doesn't apply with verbs with the affirmative ba- prefix, see also above).

Ez dauka dirurik.
not (she).has.(it) money.ART
'She hasn't got any money.'

- cf. Dirurik ez dauka. 'Money she hasn't got.' (here 'money' is emphatically topicalised or foregrounded)

Compound tense forms of verbs, and also compound verbs, are negated by placing ez in front of the finite auxiliary (or light verb); the other components of the verbal construction are normally placed after the negated finite form.

Ez du ikusi.
not AUX see.PTCP
'He hasn't seen it.'
(cf. Ikusi du. 'He has seen it.')

Johnek ez nau maite.
John.ERG not AUX love
'John doesn't love me.'
(cf. Johnek maite nau. 'John loves me.')

In this construction the postposed verb component(s) may be separated from the finite auxiliary or light verb. Focused constituents, unless somewhat heavy, will be placed between the two.

Ez dut inor ikusi hemen.
not AUX anyone see.PTCP here
'I haven't seen anyone here.'

Berak ez du John maite.
he.ERG not AUX John love
'He doesn't love John.'

Ez dut irakurri liburu hori.
not AUX read.PTCP book that
'I haven't read that book.'

An indefinite subject of an intransitive verb, or an indefinite direct object of a transitive verb, usually take the negative polarity article -(r)ik instead of the normal article -a, -ak in negative (or other negative-polar) sentences.

Ez dut dirurik ikusi hemen.
not AUX money.-ik see.PTCP here
'I haven't seen any money here.'

Ez dago urik.
not is water-ik
There is no water.'

Badago urik?
ba-is water-ik
'Is there any water?'

There are no true negative pronouns (or adverbs, etc.) as such. The negative-polar pronouns etc. are used in negative contexts (and other negative-polarity contexts too). All such words may be combined directly with ez (or gabe 'without', which also has an intrinsically negative meaning). Some speakers do accept uses of negative-polar words in isolation, with ez implicit.

Ez dut inor ikusi hemen.
not AUX anyone see.PTCP here
'I haven't seen anyone (I have seen no one) here.'

Ez dut ezer nahi.
not I.have.(it) anything want
'I don't want anything.'

Ez dago inon.
not (it).is anywhere
'It isn't anywhere.'

Ba al dago inor?
ba INTERR is anyone
'Is there anyone (there)?'

Inor ez!
anyone not
'No one!'

Ezer gabe etorri da.
anything without come.PTCP AUX
'He has come without anything.'

=== Questions ===
Yes–no questions either take the same form as the corresponding statement, or incorporate a question marker.

- John ikusi duzu? or John ikusi al duzu? 'Have you seen John?'
  [John see.PARTICIPLE (al) AUXILIARY]
- Badaki? or Ba al daki? 'Does he know?' [ba (al) he.knows.it]

There are two question markers: al for straightforward yes–no questions, and ote for tentative questions of any kind (yes–no or not). Both al and ote are placed immediately in front of the finite verb form. The question marker al is not used pan-dialectally. In some dialects the same function is performed by a suffix -a attached to the finite verb form (thus the equivalents of the above examples are John ikusi duzu(i)a? and Badakia?). Still other dialects lack either interrogative al or interrogative -a.

See Negation above concerning the use of negative polarity items; these may occur in yes–no questions.

Badator inor?
ba-(he).comes anyone
'Is anyone coming?'

Ardorik edan duzu?
wine-ik drink.PTCP AUX
'Have you drunk any wine?'

In choice questions, 'or' is either ala or edo, although the former is often taught as more correct.

- Zer nahiago duzu, beltza ala gorria? 'What do you prefer, red wine or rosé?' (lit. 'black or red')

Question words (see also Pronouns and adverbs)
nor 'who'; zer 'what'; zein 'which'; zenbat 'how many'	non 'where'; noiz 'when'; nola 'how'; zergatik 'why'

Word order in wh-questions (i.e. those with question words) is fully accounted for by the general rules of Basque word order, granted a further rule for Basque (shared by many other languages) which states that interrogative words and phrases (e.g. nor 'who?', zein etxe zuritan? 'in which white house?', zenbat diru 'how much money?', etc.) are obligatorily focused.

Therefore, wh-expressions must immediately precede the verb, and none of the verb-focusing constructions are possible (since these would result in moving the focus away from the wh-expression).

- Zer da hau? 'What is this?'
- Nora zoaz? 'Where are you going?'
- Nora joango zara? 'Where will you go?'
- Non bizi da zure laguna? 'Where does your friend live?'
- Zenbat etxetan bizi izan zara zure bizitzan? 'How many houses have you lived in in your life?'
- NOT: *Nora bazoaz? 'Where are you going?' (because ba- focuses zoaz, the verb, but nora, the question word, needs to have the focus)

The interrogative phrase is often placed first, but as in other sentences, topics may be foregrounded through fronting and so precede the wh-expression; such constructions are fairly common in Basque.

- Hau zer da? 'What is this?'
- Eta zure laguna non bizi da? 'And your friend, where does she live?'
- Zure bizitzan zenbat etxetan bizi izan zara? 'In your life how many houses have you lived in?'

== Bibliography ==
- Agirre Berezibar, J.M. (1991). Euskal gramatika deskriptiboa. Bilbao: Labayru Ikastegia. (in Basque)
- Allières, Jacques (1979). Manuel pratique de basque. Paris: Picard. (in French)
- Altube, S. (1929/1975). Erderismos. Bilbao. (in Spanish)
- Azkue, R.M. (1905/1969). Morfología vasca. Bilbao: La Gran Enciclopedia Vasca. (in Spanish)
- Campión, Arturo (1884). Gramática de los cuatro dialectos literarios de la lengua euskara. Bilbao: La Gran Enciclopedia Vasca. (in Spanish)
- Goenaga, Patxi (1980). Gramatika bideetan (second edition). Donostia: Erein. (in Basque)
- Hualde, José Ignacio & Ortiz de Urbina, Jon, eds. (2003). A grammar of Basque. Berlin: Mouton de Gruyter, 2003. ISBN 3-11-017683-1.
- King, Alan R. (1994). The Basque language: A practical introduction. University of Nevada Press. ISBN 0-87417-155-5.
- King, Alan R. & Olaizola Elordi, Begotxu (1996). Colloquial Basque: A complete language course. London and New York: Routledge. ISBN 0-415-12109-4.
- Lafitte, Pierre (1944/1979). Grammaire basque : navarro-labourdin littéraire. Donostia: Elkar. (in French)
- Rijk, Rudolf P.G. de (2008), Standard Basque: a progressive grammar, Cambridge, Massachusetts: MIT Press
- Saltarelli, M. (1988). Basque. London: Croom Helm.
- Trask, R, Larry (1996). The history of Basque. London and New York: Routledge. ISBN 0-415-13116-2.
