= Basque verbs =

Important set of words in the Basque language

The verb is one of the most complex parts of Basque grammar. It is sometimes represented as a difficult challenge for learners of the language, and many Basque grammars devote most of their pages to lists or tables of verb paradigms. This article does not give a full list of verb forms; its purpose is to explain the nature and structure of the system.

== Verb stems ==
One of the remarkable characteristics of the Basque verb is the fact that only a very few verbs can be conjugated synthetically (i.e. have morphological finite forms); the rest only have non-finite forms, which can enter into a wide variety of compound tense structures (consisting of a non-finite verb form combined with a finite auxiliary) and are conjugated in this way (periphrastically). For example, 'I come' is nator (a synthetic finite form), but 'I arrive' is iristen naiz (a periphrastic form, literally 'arriving I-am').

Synthetically conjugated verbs like 'come' can also be conjugated periphrastically (etortzen naiz). In some such cases the synthetic/periphrastic contrast is semantic (e.g. nator and etortzen naiz are not generally interchangeable); in others the contrast is more a matter of style or register, or else of diachrony (some synthetic forms of conjugation are archaic or obsolete). A few synthetic forms occurring in twentieth-century Basque literature are even a posteriori extrapolations or back-formations of historically unattested forms, created for stylistic, poetic or puristic purposes.

Traditionally Basque verbs are cited using a non-finite form conventionally referred to as the participle (although not all its uses are really participial). Other non-finite forms can be derived from the participle, as will be seen in a later section. When the verb possesses synthetic finite forms, these are based on an ultimate stem (called the "basic stem" here) which is normally also present in the participle. For example, the verb etorri 'come' has the basic stem -tor- from which are derived both the participle etorri (with the non-finite prefix e- and the participle suffix -i) and the finite present stem -ator- and non-present stem -etor-.

The participle is generally obtained from the basic stem by prefixing e- or i- (there is no rule; if the stem begins with a vowel, j- is prefixed instead), and suffixing -i (to stems ending in a consonant) or -n (to stems ending in a vowel). Occasionally there is no suffix. The verbal noun stem, another non-finite form, is obtained by replacing the suffixes -i and -n (and also -tu or -du, see below) of the participle by either -tze or -te. A third non-finite form which we shall call the "short stem" is obtained from the participle by omitting any of these suffixes except -n, which is retained in the short stem in those verbs whose participle has it.

Some primary verb stems having finite forms
Finite			Non-finite			Meaning
Basic stem (root)	Present stem	Non-present stem	Participle	Verbal noun	Short stem	Meaning
-tor-	-ator-	-etor-	e-torr-i	e-tor-tze	e-tor	'come'
-bil-	-abil-	-ebil-	i-bil-i	i-bil-tze	i-bil	'go about'
-kar-	-akar-	-ekar-	e-karr-i	e-kar-tze	e-kar	'bring'
-uka- (< -duka-)	-auka-	-euka-	e-duki	e-duki-tze	e-duki	'hold, have'
(irregular: see below)			i-za-n	i-za-te	i-za-n	'be', auxiliary
-go-	-ago-	-ego-	e-go-n	e-go-te	e-go-n	'stay, be'
-oa-	-oa-	-i(h)oa-	j-oa-n	j-oa-te	j-oa-n	'go'
-rama-	-arama-	-erama-	e-rama-n	e-rama-te	e-rama-n	'take'
-(a)ki-	-aki-	-eki- (dial. -aki-)	j-aki-n	j-aki-te	j-aki-n	'know'

A larger number of Basque verbs have no finite forms, but their non-finite forms follow the same pattern described above (they show an e-/i-/j- prefix, and the participle ends in -i, -n or occasionally zero.

Some primary verb stems without finite forms
Participle	Verbal noun	Short stem	Meaning
e-baki	e-baki-tze	e-baki	'cut'
e-da-n	e-da-te	e-da-n	'drink'
e-gos-i	e-gos-te	e-gos	'boil'
e-ho	e-ho-tze	e-ho	'grind'
e-ror-i	e-ror-tze	e-ror	'fall'
e-ros-i	e-ros-te	e-ros	'buy'
e-uts-i	e-us-te	e-uts	'take hold (of)'
e-zarr-i	e-zar-tze	e-zar	'put, place'
i-go-(n)	i-go-te/tze	i-go-(n)	'go up, rise'
i-kas-i	i-kas-te	i-kas	'learn'
i-pin-i	i-pin-tze	i-pin	'put'
i-reki	i-reki-tze	i-reki	'open'
i-tzal-i	i-tzal-tze	i-tzal	'go/put out (light, fire)'
i-tzul-i	i-tzul-tze	i-tzul	'return'
j-aits-i	j-ais-te	j-aits	'go down'
j-a-n	j-a-te	j-a-n	'eat'
j-antz-i	j-anz-te	j-antz	'dress'
j-arr-i	j-ar-tze	j-ar	'put'
j-i-n	j-i-te	j-i-n	'come'
j-o	j-o-tze	j-o	'strike'

There is also another large group of verbs which again have only non-finite forms, in which the non-finite stem is unanalysable (as a verb, at least), thus there is no e-/i-/j- prefix. In most cases the participle of such verbs has the suffix -tu (-du if the stem ends in n or l). Occasionally we find zero or -i instead. This is replaced by -tze or -te in the verbal noun, and by nothing in the short stem. The stems of these secondary verbs may be (1) a nominal or other non-verbal stem (e.g. poz-tu, garbi-tu...), (2) a phrase (e.g. ohera-tu), (3) a Latin or Romance verbal stem (e.g. barka-tu, kanta-tu...) or (4) an unanalysable (primary) verb stem (e.g. har-tu).

Some secondary verb stems
Participle	Verbal noun	Short stem	Meaning	Lexical source
afal-du	afal-tze	afal	'eat supper'	afari 'supper'
alda-tu	alda-tze	alda	'change'	alde 'difference'
garbi-tu	garbi-tze	garbi	'clean'	garbi 'clean (adj.)'
ohera-tu	ohera-tze	ohera	'go/put to bed'	ohe-ra 'to bed'
poz-tu	poz-te	poz	'be/become happy'	poz 'happiness, joy'
baina-tu	baina-tze	baina	'bathe'	Spanish baña- 'bathe'
barka-tu	barka-tze	barka	'forgive'	Latin parc- 'spare'
begira-tu	begira-tze	begira	'look after, look at, observe'	begira 'looking', from begi 'eye'
kanta-tu	kanta-tze	kanta	'sing'	Spanish canta- 'sing'
gal-du	gal-tze	gal	'lose'	
har-tu	har-tze	har	'take'	
ken-du	ken-tze	ken	'take away, remove'	
sal-du	sal-tze	sal	'sell'	
sar-tu	sar-tze	sar	'enter'	
atera	atera-tze	atera	'take out, go out'	ate-ra 'to (the) door'
bota	bota-tze	bota	'throw'	Spanish bota- 'throw'
hil	hil-tze	hil	'die, kill'	
has-i	has-te	has	'begin'	

=== Defective or anomalous verb stems ===
==== Izan ('be') ====
The verb 'to be', the most common verb in the language, is irregular and shows some stem allomorphy in its finite forms. Its participle is izan.

==== Egon ====
Another verb, egon, is used in western dialects (and in writing) as a second verb 'to be' in a way similar to estar in Spanish.

==== Izan ('have') ====
The verb 'to have', also extremely common, also shows irregularities in its finite conjugation. In western and central dialects and in standard Basque, izan is used as its participle, i.e. the same participle as for 'to be'; the two meanings are disambiguated by the context. Given that Basque verbs are conventionally cited in their participle form, this presents a problem for metalinguistic terminology, because the verb izan is ambiguous.

==== Ukan/*Edun ====
Eastern dialects avoid this ambiguity by using ukan as the participle of 'to have', reserving izan for 'to be', and some grammarians employ izan and ukan in this way for convenience, but this could create confusion since most Basque speakers do not actually employ ukan (or even know it as a metalinguistic term). Other grammarians refer to 'to have' as *edun, which is a hypothetical, unattested form derived from the finite stem -du-; again, the problem is that *edun does not exist in real Basque usage.

To avoid such problems, this article simply refers to "the verb 'to be'" and "the verb 'to have'".

==== *Edin, *Ezan ====
The two standard aorist auxiliaries (see below) lack any non-finite forms, and so also have no obvious citation forms. As with *edun, some grammars construct hypothetical participles based on the finite stems, referring to *edin (the intransitive aorist auxiliary) and *ezan (the transitive aorist auxiliary).

==== Eduki ====
There is another verb which also means 'have', at least in western dialects, namely eduki. As a lexical verb (rather than an auxiliary), many speakers and writers frequently use this verb. (This is somewhat reminiscent of, though not entirely parallel to, the Spanish distribution of haber and tener.)

==== Esan ====
The verb esan ('to say') possesses finite forms which have a different stem, -io- (e.g. diot 'I say'). Some grammarians treat these as different defective verbs, while others consider them a single word with stem allomorphy.

== Synthetic conjugation ==
=== Tense structure and stem forms ===
Synthetic (single-word) conjugation involves the following finite "tenses":

The simple "tenses"
	(Non-potential)	Potential	Imperative
Present	Present	Present potential	Imperative
Past	Past	Past potential	
Hypothetic	Hypothetic	Hypothetic potential	

Finite verbs have a basic finite stem that is either an unanalysable lexical root (e.g. -bil- 'go about, move (intr.)') or such a root preceded by the causative/intensive prefix -ra- (e.g. -rabil- 'cause to move, use'). From regular basic stems two tense stems are derived as follows: the present stem with prefix -a- and the non-present stem with prefix -e-, e.g. -abil- and -ebil- are the regular present and non-present stems of -bil-, -arabil- and -erabil- are the corresponding tense stems of -rabil-, and so on. The present stem is used in the present tense, the present potential tense and the non-third-person imperative, e.g. present d-abil 'he/she/it goes about', present potential d-abil-ke 'he/she/it may go about', second-person imperative h-abil! 'go about!'. The non-present stem is used in the past and hypothetic tenses (non-potential and potential), and in third-person imperative forms, e.g. z-ebil-en 'he/she/it went about', ba-l-ebil 'if he/she/it went about', z-ebil-ke-en 'he/she/it might or would have gone about', l-ebil-ke 'he/she/it might or would go about', b-ebil! 'let him/her/it go about!' (not in common use).

Non-present stems are further characterised by prefixes containing an n whenever the primary index (defined below) is non-third-person, e.g. z-ebil-en 'he went about' but n-enbil-en 'I went about', h-enbil-en 'you went about'; l-erabil-ke 'he would use it' but n-inderabil-ke 'he would use me'.

The suffix -(e)n is a marker of the past tenses, and -ke of the potential tenses (the past potential has both: -ke-en). The hypothetic non-potential tense usually occurs with the subordinator prefix ba- 'if', which will therefore be shown in examples; use of ba- is not restricted to the hypothetic, however (e.g. ba-dabil 'if he goes about', etc.). Apart from the tense markers mentioned, third-person prefixes distinguish between present, past, hypothetic and imperative tenses, as will be seen below.

Synopses of two verbs are given in the following table as illustrations. The verb 'to be' (izan) is irregular but in extremely frequent use, because it also serves as an important auxiliary. The verb ibili 'go about, move, etc.' (root -bil-) is regularly conjugated, although not all its synthetic forms are in widespread use. This synoptic table shows third-person forms.

Synopsis of simple "tenses"
	izan 'to be'			ibili 'to go about'		
	Non-potential	Potential	Imperative	Non-potential	Potential	Imperative
Present	da 'is'	daiteke 'may be'	biz (archaic) 'let (it) be!'	dabil 'goes about'	dabilke 'may go about'	bebil 'let (it) go about!'
Past	zen 'was'	zatekeen 'would have been'		zebilen 'went about'	zebilkeen 'would have gone about'	
Hypothetic	ba-litz 'if X were'	litzateke 'would be'		ba-lebil 'if X went about'	lebilke 'would go about'	

=== Primary person indices ===
All conjugating verb stems (unless defective) can take the following set of person-indexing prefixes: n- (first-person singular), h- (second-person singular informal), g- (first-person plural), z- (second-person singular formal and second-person plural). With intransitive verbs, these prefixes index the subject; with transitives, they index the direct object. For convenience, we shall refer to this as the set of 'primary person indices'.

First- and second-person primary indices
Person	Pronoun	Prefix
1 singular	ni	n-
2 singular informal	hi	h-
1 plural	gu	g-
2 singular polite/plural	zu/zuek	z-

The following table shows some examples of how these prefixes combine with verb stems to produce a wide range of finite verb forms.

First- and second-person primary indices (examples)
		Intransitive		Transitive	
		'to be'	ibili 'to go about'	'to have'	ekarri 'to bring'
Present	ni	n-aiz (I am)	n-abil (I go about)	n-au (has me)	n-akar (brings me)
Present	hi	h-aiz	h-abil	h-au	h-akar
Present	gu	g-ara	g-abiltza	g-aitu	g-akartza
Present	zu	z-ara	z-abiltza	z-aitu	z-akartza
Past	ni	n-intz-en (I was)	n-enbil-en	n-indu-en	n-indekarr-en
Past	hi	h-intz-en	h-enbil-en	h-indu-en	h-indekarr-en
Past	gu	g-in-en	g-enbiltza-n	g-intu-en	g-indekartza-n
Past	zu	z-in-en	z-enbiltza-n	z-intu-en	z-indekartza-n
Hypothetic	ni	ba-n-intz (if I were)	ba-n-enbil	ba-n-indu	ba-n-indekar
Hypothetic	hi	ba-h-intz	ba-h-enbil	ba-h-indu	ba-h-indekar
Hypothetic	gu	ba-g-ina	ba-g-enbiltza	ba-g-intu	ba-g-indekartza
Hypothetic	zu	ba-z-ina	ba-z-enbiltza	ba-z-intu	ba-z-indekartza

=== Third-person forms ===
Third-person verbs (here the "person" again refers to the subject in intransitive verbs but the object in transitives) also take a prefix, which is invariable for number (singular or plural) but varies for tense, as follows: d- is used in the present tense, z- in the past, l- in the hypothetic and b- in third-person imperative forms (generally archaic or literary).

Third-person prefixes
Tense	Affix
Present	d-
Past	z-
Hypothetic	l-
Imperative	b-

Some illustrative examples follow.

Third-person verb forms
		Intransitive		Transitive	
		'to be'	ibili 'to go about'	'to have'	ekarri 'to bring'
Present	Singular	d-a (is)	d-abil (goes about)	d-u (has him/her/it)	d-akar (brings him/her/it)
Present	Plural	d-ira (are)	d-abiltza	d-itu (has them)	d-akartza
Past	Singular	z-en (was)	z-ebil-en	z-uen	z-ekarr-en
Past	Plural	z-ir-en	z-ebiltza-n	z-itu-en	z-ekartza-n
Hypothetic	Singular	ba-l-itz	ba-l-ebil	ba-l-u	ba-l-ekar
Hypothetic	Plural	ba-l-ira	ba-l-ebiltza	ba-l-itu	ba-l-ekartza

Third-person imperative
Imperative	Singular	b-iz (archaic) (let him/her/it be)	b-ebil (rare)	b-eu (obsolete)	b-ekar (literary)
Imperative	Plural	b-ira (obsolete) (let them be)	b-ebiltza (rare)		b-ekartza (literary)

=== Plural marking ===
Plural number is marked in finite verbs in various ways, depending on the arguments whose plurality is being indexed. One set of plural forms are "primary", that is, once again they refer to either the "intransitive subject" or the "transitive object" (the absolutive case agreement). The form of primary plural marking varies irregularly according to the verb stem, and may involve miscellaneous stem changes or the placement of a plural marker immediately adjacent to the singular stem (-z, -zki, -tza, it-, -te). Singular and plural forms of some finite verb stems are shown in the following table.

Some singular and plural finite stems (present tense forms)
Intransitive			Transitive		
Singular subject	Plural subject	Meaning	Singular object	Plural object	Meaning
-a-iz, -a-∅	-a-ra (< *-a-ira), -∅-ira (verbal root change)	'be'	-a-u, -∅-u	-a-it-u-[z], -∅-it-u-[z]	'have'
-a-go	-a-u-de (< *-a-go-te)	'stay, be'	-a-u-ka	-a-u-z-ka	'hold, have'
-a-bil	-a-bil-tza	'go about, move'	-a-kar	-a-kar-tza	'bring'
-oa	-oa-z	'go'	-a-ra-ma / -a-r-oa (both from *-a-ra-oa, with causative infix -ra-)	-a-ra-ma-tza / -a-r-oa-z	'take'
-a-tor	-a-to-z (< *-a-tor-z)	'come'	-a-ki	-a-ki-zki	'know'

Primary plural marking occurs whenever the indexed argument (subject or direct object) is plural. The second-person singular polite (pronoun zu) is also treated as plural for this purpose (because originally it was a second-person plural), although syntactically and semantically singular. To index the second-person plural (pronoun zuek), in addition to the markers corresponding to zu a further ('secondary') plural marker -te is suffixed.

Plural marking associated with primary arguments
(PRESENT)		Intransitive		Transitive	
(PRESENT)		'to be'	i-bil-i 'to go about'	'to have'	e-karr-i 'to bring'
Singular	ni	n-a-iz	n-a-bil	n-a-u	n-a-kar
Singular	hi	h-a-iz	h-a-bil	h-a-u	h-a-kar
Singular	hura	d-a-∅	d-a-bil	d-∅-u	d-a-kar
Plural	gu	g-a-ra (< *g-a-ira)	g-a-bil-tza	g-a-it-u	g-a-kar-tza
Plural	zu	z-a-ra (< *z-a-ira)	z-a-bil-tza	z-a-it-u	z-a-kar-tza
Plural	zuek	z-a-re-te (< *z-a-ira-te)	z-a-bil-tza-te	z-a-it-u-z-te (*)	z-a-kar-tza-te
Plural	haiek	d-∅-ira	d-a-bil-tza	d-∅-it-u	d-a-kar-tza

Note: The underlying plural stem of the transitive auxiliary -u is -ituz: its final -z only surfaces before the plural marker -te and potential marker -ke:

- zaituzte (they have you)
- dituzte (they have them)
- lituzke (s/he could have them)

=== Ergative person and number suffixes ===
The ergative case is the case of subjects of transitive verbs. Such arguments are indexed in a different way "primary" arguments. Person of the ergative marker may be indexed in one of two ways: using suffixes or prefixes. The ergative-index plural marker is always a suffix (-te). The ergative person suffixes are as follows; those for the first- and second-person singular end in -a whenever another suffix morpheme follows them. The absence of an ergative suffix in transitive verbs (except those discussed in the next section) implies a third-person subject.

ERGATIVE SUFFIXES
PERSON	PRONOUN	SUFFIX	
PERSON	PRONOUN	(word-final)	(non-word-final)
1 singular	nik	-t	-da-
2 singular informal masculine	hik	-k	-a-
2 singular informal feminine	hik	-n(a)	-na-
3 singular	hark	—	
1 plural	guk	-gu(-)	
2 singular polite	zuk	-zu(-)	
2 plural	zuek	-zue(-)	
3 plural	haiek	-te(-)	

A few sample paradigms follow.

Ergative suffixes (examples)
		'to have'			ekarri 'to bring'
		'(I ... ) have him/her/it'	'(I ... ) have them'	'(you ... ) have me'	'(I ... ) bring him/her/it'
Present	nik	d-u-t	d-itu-t	—	d-akar-t
Present	hik male	d-u-k	d-itu-k	n-au-k	d-akar-k
Present	hik female	d-u-n	d-itu-n	n-au-n	d-akar-na
Present	hark	d-u	d-itu	n-au	d-akar
Present	guk	d-u-gu	d-itu-gu	—	d-akar-gu
Present	zuk	d-u-zu	d-itu-zu	n-au-zu	d-akar-zu
Present	zuek	d-u-zu-e	d-itu-zu-e	n-au-zu-e	d-akar-zu-e
Present	haiek	d-u-te	d-ituz-te	n-au-te	d-akar-te
Past	nik	(See following section)		—	(See following section)
Past	hik male	(See following section)		n-indu-a-n	(See following section)
Past	hik female	(See following section)		n-indu-na-n	(See following section)
Past	hark	z-u-en	z-itu-en	n-indu-en	z-ekarr-en
Past	guk	(See following section)		—	(See following section)
Past	zuk	(See following section)		n-indu-zu-n	(See following section)
Past	zuek	(See following section)		n-indu-zu-e-n	(See following section)
Past	haiek	z-u-te-n	z-ituz-te-n	n-indu-te-n	z-ekar-te-n

=== Ergative person prefixes ===
Instead of the ergative suffixes, ergative prefixes are used to index first- or second-person ergative arguments if the tense is non-present and the direct object is third person (see the gaps in the previous table). The ergative prefixes are identical to the primary prefixes in the singular, but in the plural -en- is added to the primary prefix forms:

Ergative prefixes
Person	Pronoun	Prefix
1 singular	nik	n-
2 singular informal	hik	h-
1 plural	guk	gen-
2 singular polite/plural	zuk/zuek	zen-

The ergative plural suffix -te only occurs when required (a) to indicate the third person plural, or (b) to indicate the (real) second-person plural.

Ergative prefixes (examples)
	'to have'				ekarri 'to bring'
	'(I) had him/her/it' (past)	'(I) had them' (past)	'if (I) had him/her/it' (hypothetic)	'(I) would have him/her/it' (hypothetic potential)	'(I) brought him/her/it' (past)
nik	n-u-en	n-itu-en	ba-n-u	n-u-ke	n-ekarr-en
hik	h-u-en	h-itu-en	ba-h-u	h-u-ke	h-ekarr-en
hark	z-u-en	z-itu-en	ba-l-u	l-u-ke	z-ekarr-en
guk	gen-u-en	gen-itu-en	ba-gen-u	gen-u-ke	gen-ekarr-en
zuk	zen-u-en	zen-itu-en	ba-zen-u	zen-u-ke	zen-ekarr-en
zuek	zen-u-te-n	zen-ituz-te-n	ba-zen-u-te	zen-u-ke-te	zen-ekar-te-n
haiek	z-u-te-n	z-ituz-te-n	ba-l-u-te	l-u-ke-te	z-ekar-te-n

=== Dative argument indices ===
Finite verbs that have an argument in the dative case also index the dative argument using the following set of dative suffixes (which are identical in form to the ergative suffixes except in the third person):

DATIVE SUFFIXES
PERSON	PRONOUN	SUFFIX	
PERSON	PRONOUN	(word-final)	(non-word-final)
1 singular	niri	-t	-da-
2 singular informal masculine	hiri	-k	-a-
2 singular informal feminine	hiri	-n (-na)	-na-
3 singular	hari	-o(-)	
1 plural	guri	-gu(-)	
2 singular polite	zuri	-zu(-)	
2 plural	zuei	-zue(-)	
3 plural	haiei	-e(-)	

Both intransitive and transitive verbs may take dative indices, and the mechanism for incorporating these is the same in either case. Dative suffixes immediately follow the verb stem, preceding other suffixes such as the ergative suffixes (thus in d-i-da-zu 'you have it to me', -da- is the dative suffix and -zu is the ergative suffix) or the potential suffix -ke (as well as the past suffix -(e)n, which is always word-final).

Only the primary plural marker, if present, and the dative-argument marker precede the dative suffix. The dative-argument marker, whose regular form is -ki-, is added to basic verb stems to indicate that these are taking a dative argument. With -ki-, the primary plural marker always takes the form of -z- immediately preceding -ki-. A few verb stems have an irregular dative-argument form.

Some dative-argument verb stem forms
Intransitive				Transitive			
Basic stem (present)	Dative stem		Meaning	Basic stem	Dative stem		Meaning
Basic stem (present)	Sing. subject	Plur. subject	Meaning	Basic stem	Sing. dir. obj.	Plur. dir. obj.	Meaning
-aiz, -a	zai-	zaizki-	'be'	-au, -u	-i-	-izki-	'have'
-ago	-agoki-	-agozki-	'stay, be'	-akar	-akarki-	-akarzki-	'bring'
-abil	-abilki-	-abilzki-	'go about, move'	-arama	-aramaki-	-aramazki-	'take'
-oa	-oaki-	-oazki-	'go'				
-ator	-atorki-	-atozki-	'come'				

The most commonly used dative verb forms are those of the irregular verbs 'to be' and 'to have', which are in constant use as tense auxiliaries, when these verbs have no lexical meaning of their own. This is the reason why many of the glosses given below sound odd (e.g. dit 'he has it to me'); an example of a more natural-sounding use of this form as an auxiliary would be eman dit 'he has given it to me'. Nevertheless, the following table serves to clarify the morphological structure of dative-argument verb forms.

Dative-argument forms (examples)
INTRANSITIVE VERBS	'to be'			etorri 'to come'	
INTRANSITIVE VERBS	'he/she/it is to (me ... )'	'they are to (me ... )'	'he/she/it was to (me ... )'	'he/she/it comes to (me ... )'	'I come to (him/her/it ... )'
niri	zai-t	zaizki-t	z-itzai-da-n	d-atorki-t	—
hari	zai-o	zaizki-o	z-itzai-o-n	d-atorki-o	n-atorki-o
guri	zai-gu	zaizki-gu	z-itzai-gu-n	d-atorki-gu	—
haiei	zai-e	zaizki-e	z-itzai-e-n	d-atorki-e	n-atorki-e
TRANSITIVE VERBS	'to have'				ekarri 'to bring'
TRANSITIVE VERBS	'he/she/it has him/her/it to (me ... )'	'you have him/her/it to (me ... )'	'he/she/it has them to (me ... )'	'he/she/it had him/her/it to (me ... )'	'he/she/it brings him/her/it to (me ... )'
niri	d-i-t	d-i-da-zu	d-izki-t	z-i-da-n	d-akarki-t
hari	d-i-o	d-i-o-zu	d-izki-o	z-i-o-n	d-akarki-o
guri	d-i-gu	d-i-gu-zu	d-izki-gu	z-i-gu-n	d-akarki-gu
haiei	d-i-e	d-i-e-zu	d-izki-e	z-i-e-n	d-akarki-e

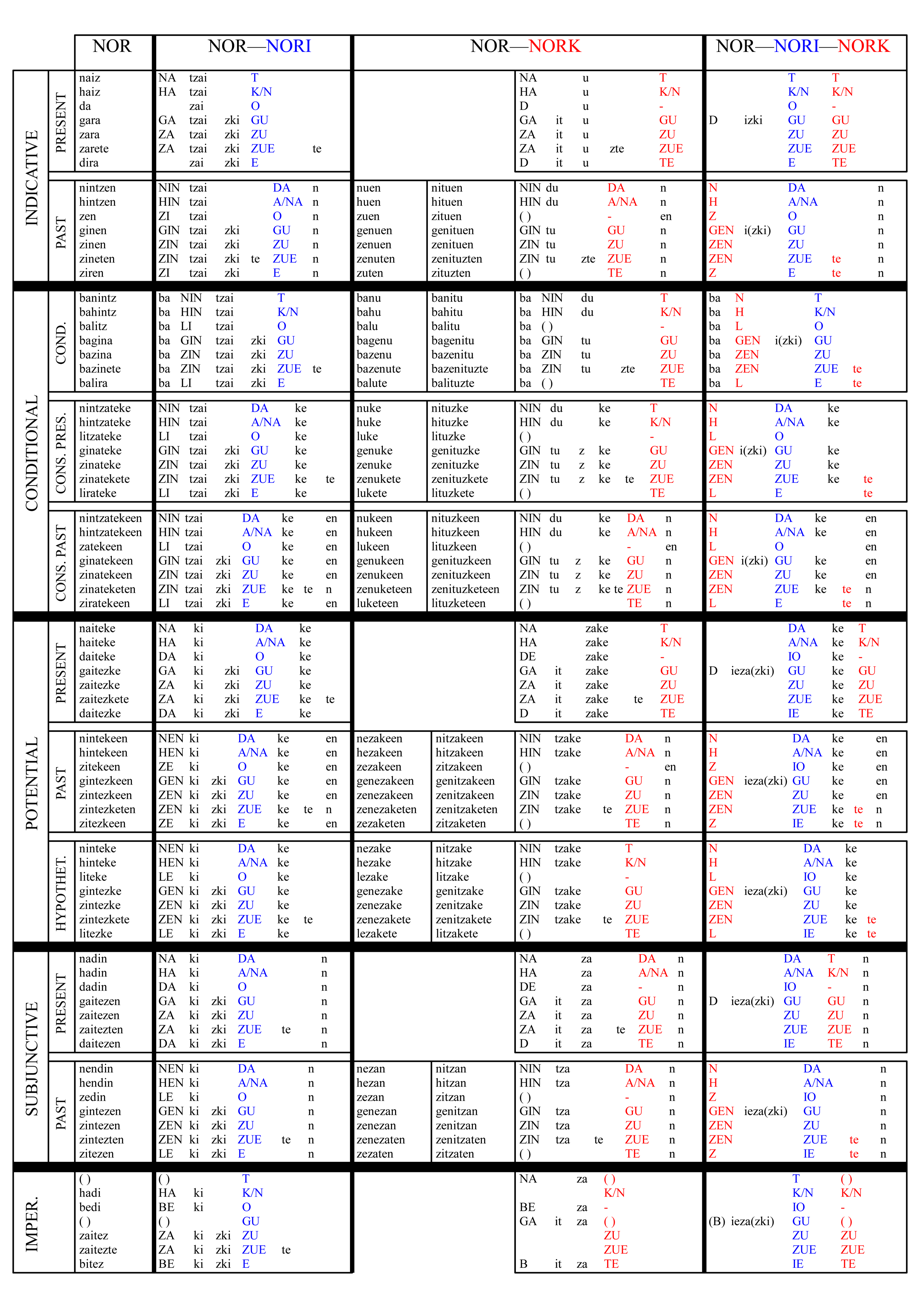
A complete table of the most common forms of the auxiliaries izan and ukan

=== Familiar forms and allocutive indices (hika) ===
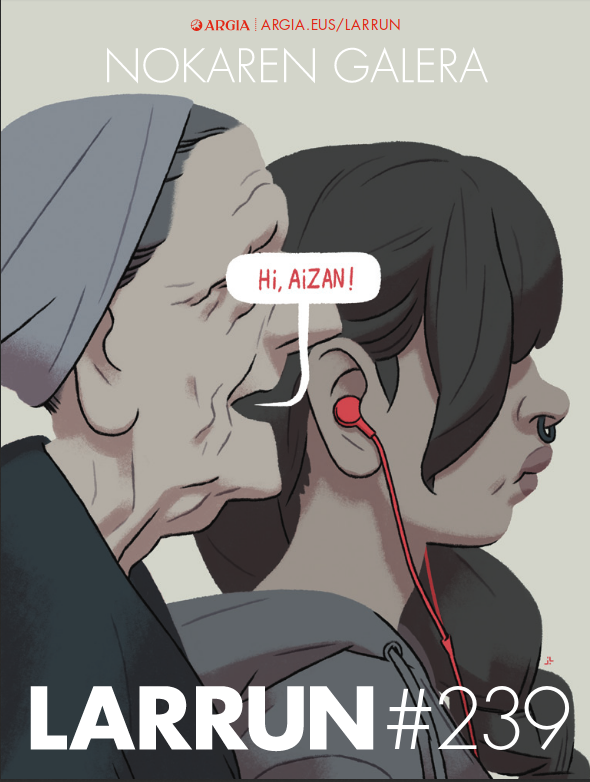
2019 Argia magazine cover about the loss of noka (feminine hika). Hi, aizan! means "Thou [female], hear!".

Old Basque speakers talking in Basque about the perception of hika.

In colloquial Basque, an informal relationship and social solidarity between the speaker and a single interlocutor may be expressed by employing a special mode of speech often referred to in Basque as either hika or hitano (both derived from hi, the informal second-person pronoun; in other places the same phenomenon is named noka and toka for female and male interlocutors respectively). The obligatory grammatical characteristics of this mode are:

- The personal pronoun hi is used (rather than the polite second-person singular pronoun zu).
- All finite verb forms that index a second-person argument take (as one would expect) the corresponding hi forms, e.g. haiz "you are" (rather than zara), dun or duk "you have it" (rather than duzu), etc.:

Familiar second-person forms (examples)
Meaning	Polite	Familiar	
Meaning	Polite	female	male
"you are"	zara	haiz	
"you were"	zinen	hintzen	
"you come"	zatoz	hator	
"you have it"	duzu	dun	duk
"you have them"	dituzu	ditun	dituk
"you had it"	zenuen	huen	
"you know it"	dakizu	dakin	dakik
"it is to you"	zaizu	zain	zaik
"(s)he has it to you"	dizu	din	dik
"(s)he has them to you"	dizkizu	dizkin	dizkik
"I have it to you"	dizut	dinat	diat
"(s)he had it to you"	zizun	zinan	zian
"I had it to you"	nizun	ninan	nian

- Obligatorily in independent declarative clauses with finite verb forms not indexing a true second-person argument, an additional second-person index is incorporated. This is known as the allocutive construction, and we may refer to these second-person indices that do not refer to a syntactic argument of the verb as "allocutive indices".

The allocutive suffixes are identical in form to the ergative and dative suffixes.

ALLOCUTIVE SUFFIXES
PERSON	SUFFIX	
PERSON	(word-final)	(non-word-final)
2 singular informal masculine	-k	-a-
2 singular informal feminine	-n (-na)	-na-

Allocutive suffixes follow the dative suffixes, the potential -ke- and ergative third-person plural -te-, and precedes other ergative suffixes (except for the synthetic forms of the verb esan with plural object). Depending on the verb in question, there may also be some other changes:

The allocutive forms of the verb "to be" (izan) without a dative argument use the root -(it)u-. They are identical to the forms of the verb "to have", except for third-person in non-present tenses:

Familiar allocutive forms: izan (examples)
Meaning	Polite	Familiar		Also means ...	Notes
Meaning	Polite	female	male	Also means ...	Notes
"(s)he/it is"	da	dun	duk	'you have him/her/it'	
"(s)he/it was"	zen	zunan	zuan		cf. huen "you had it/her/him"
"(s)he/it would be"	litzateke	luken	lukek		cf. huke "you would have it/her/him"
"I am"	naiz	naun	nauk	"you have me"	
"I was"	nintzen	nindunan	ninduan	"you had me"	
"I would be"	nintzateke	ninduken	nindukek	"you would have me"	
"we are"	gara	gaitun	gaituk	"you have us"	
"they are"	dira	ditun	dituk	"you have them"	

In the allocutive forms of the verb "to have" (izan) without a dative argument the -u- in the root changes to -i- (so the root becomes -(it)i). Some form are identical to the forms of the verb "to have" with dative argument

Familiar allocutive forms: *edun/ukan (examples)
Meaning	Polite	Familiar		Also means ...	Notes
Meaning	Polite	female	male	Also means ...	Notes
"(s)he/it has it"	du	din	dik	"he/she/it has it to you"	
"I have it"	dut	dinat	diat	"I have it to you"	
"we have it"	dugu	dinagu	diagu	"we have it to you"	
"they have it"	dute	diten	ditek		and not *di(n)ate
"(s)he/it has them"	ditu	ditun	dituk	"(s)he/it has them to you"	
"I have them"	ditut	ditinat	ditiat		cf. dizki(n)at "I have them to you"
"(s)he/it had it"	zuen	zinan	zian	"(s)he/it had it to you"	
"I had it"	nuen	ninan	nian	"I had it to you"	
"(s)he/it has me"	nau	nain	naik		
"they had us"	gintuzten	gintiztenan	gintiztean		and not *ginti(n)aten or anything like *gindizki(n)aten

In all other verb forms, the procedure is as follows, sometimes (there is considerable dialectal variation on this point), the third-person present-tense primary prefix d- changes to z- and/or the present-tense stem formant -a- changes to -ia- or -e- in the allocutive forms.
In standard Basque, d- changes to z- in transitive aorist auxiliaries (*ezan) and all non-auxiliary verbs. The present-tense format may or may not change to -e-. If the allocutive suffix immediately follows the verb stem ending in a consonant, a vowel is inserted (-a- after -z- pluralizer, -e- otherwise).
In the synthetic forms of the verb esan with plural object, the allocutive suffix is placed after the pluralizer -z- (which, as an exception, is placed after an ergative suffix). In the singular forms of this verb the allocutive suffix is placed as usual (i.e. before ergative suffix).

Familiar allocutive forms (examples)
Meaning	Polite	Familiar		Notes
Meaning	Polite	female	male	Notes
"(s)he/it comes"	dator	zatorren, zetorren	zatorrek, zetorrek	
"I come"	nator	natorren	natorrek	
"We come"	gatoz	gatozan	gatozak	
"(s)he/it knows"	daki	zakin, zekin	zakik, zekik	cf. dakin/k "You know"
"I know it"	dakit	zakinat, zekinat	zakiat, zekiat	
"(S)he/it brings me"	nakar	nakarren	nakarrek	cf. nakarna/k "You bring me"
"I can be"	izan naiteke	izan naiteken	izan naitekek	and not nazaken/k
"I can see it"	ikus dezaket	ikus zezakenat	ikus zezakeat	
"I say these"	diodaz	ziodazan	ziodazak	
"I say it"	diot	zionat	zioat	
"it/(s)he is to it/her/him"	zaio	zaion	zaiok	
"it/(s)he is to me"	zait	zaidan	zaidak	
"it/(s)he has it to it/her/him"	dio	zion	ziok	cf. dion/k "You have it to it/her/him"
"it/(s)he has it to me"	dit	zidan	zidak	cf. didan/k "You have it to me"

Eastern Basque dialects extend the allocutive system to the more polite form of address, zu (known as zuka or zutano), or the affectionate variant xu. The rules are similar.
Such dialects have three levels of address:

allocutive hi (with a female/male distinction) is the most intimate
allocutive zu or xu is polite but friendly
the absence of allocutive constructions is the most neutral or formal

But most dialects lack the middle level.

The use of hika forms is diminishing being perceived as more direct and close, but also rural and impolite. Even among who use them, the masculine forms are more frequently used than the feminine ones, sometimes even using masculine forms for women. An explanation is that, in the rural exodus of Basque peasants, men would end up working in a factory with people of their same town, while women became maids, shop clerks or waitresses where informal Basque would be felt improper.

== Periphrastic conjugation ==
=== Compound tense stem forms ===
Compound tense forms consist of a non-finite verb form (the compound tense stem) and a finite auxiliary form. We shall begin by looking at the non-finite stems. Each verb has four: the perfect, future, imperfect and short stems. The perfect stem is identical to the participle (see above). The future stem is obtained from the participle by adding -ko (-go after n). The imperfect stem is the verbal noun (see above) plus the suffix -n. The form of the short stem was discussed above. Some examples follow.

Compound tense stems (examples)
Perfect stem	Future stem	Imperfect stem	Short stem	Meaning
hartu	hartuko	hartzen	har	'take'
garbitu	garbituko	garbitzen	garbi	'clean'
kendu	kenduko	kentzen	ken	'take away, remove'
poztu	poztuko	pozten	poz	'be/become happy'
ibili	ibiliko	ibiltzen	ibil	'go about'
ikusi	ikusiko	ikusten	ikus	'see'
iritsi	iritsiko	iristen	irits	'arrive'
ireki	irekiko	irekitzen	ireki	'open'
bete	beteko	betetzen	bete	'fill'
jo	joko	jotzen	jo	'strike'
hil	hilko	hiltzen	hil	'die, kill'
egin	egingo	egiten	egin	'make, do'
eman	emango	ematen	eman	'give'
esan	esango	esaten	esan	'say'

=== Compound tense auxiliaries ===
By combining the four compound tense stems with various auxiliaries, one obtains four groups of compound tense, sometimes referred to in Basque grammar as "aspects", which we shall call Imperfect, Perfect, Future and Aorist (= "aspect"-less) respectively.

The choice of auxiliary depends on the "aspect" and also on whether the verb is intransitive or transitive. Except in the aorist, the auxiliary for intransitives is the verb 'to be', while that for transitives is the verb 'to have'. In the Aorist a different pair of auxiliaries is used, one for intransitives and another for transitives. Since neither of the latter is used other than as an auxiliary, and neither has a participle (or other non-finite form) to provide a convenient citation form, we shall simply refer to them as the (intransitive and transitive) aorist auxiliaries.

The auxiliaries adopt all the argument indices (for subject, direct object and/or indirect object as the case may be, as well as the allocutive where applicable) that correspond to the verb within its clause.

Compound tense patterns
"ASPECT"	TENSE STEM	INTRANSITIVE	TRANSITIVE
IMPERFECT	IMPERFECT +	'to be'	'to have'
PERFECT	PERFECT +	'to be'	'to have'
FUTURE	FUTURE +	'to be'	'to have'
AORIST	SHORT +	Intransitive Aorist Auxiliary	Transitive Aorist Auxiliary

The above diagram illustrates the patterns with auxiliaries in the present tense. However, the same auxiliaries may be used in a wide variety of tenses, not only in the present. The following two tables lay out synoptically the possible auxiliary/tense combinations for intransitive and transitive auxiliaries respectively.

Tenses of the intransitive auxiliaries (sample forms)
	'Be' auxiliary		Aorist Auxiliary		
	Non-potential	Potential	Non-potential	Potential	Imperative
Present	naiz	naizateke (literary)	nadi-n	naiteke	hadi
Past	nintzen	nintzatekeen (literary)	nendi-n	nintekeen	
Hypothetic	banintz	nintzateke	banendi (literary)	ninteke	

Tenses of the transitive auxiliaries (sample forms)
	'Have' auxiliary		Aorist Auxiliary		
	Non-potential	Potential	Non-potential	Potential	Imperative
Present	dut	duket (literary)	dezada-n	dezaket	ezak
Past	nuen	nukeen (literary)	neza-n	nezakeen	
Hypothetic	banu	nuke	baneza (literary)	nezake	

The four auxiliary verbs can be alternately analysed as irregular stem forms of the same auxiliary verb izan, as is given in Wiktionary.

=== Simple and compound tenses ===
The following are the most usual Basque tenses. By considering both simple and compound tenses as part of a single list, one can better see how the whole system fits together and compare the tenses with each other.

Some simple and compound tenses
Tense	Form	Examples	Observations
Present simple	SYNTHETIC PRESENT	naiz 'I am'; nator 'I am coming'; daukat 'I have (it)'; dakit 'I know'	Only those few verbs that can be conjugated synthetically have this tense. With stative verbs (e.g. izan 'be' or 'have', egon, eduki, jakin...) it expresses present state, e.g. da 'is'. With dynamic verbs (e.g. etorri, joan, ibili, ekarri, eraman...) it most often expresses ongoing action at the time of speaking, e.g. dator 'is coming', but note also badator 'if (X) comes', datorrenean 'when (X) comes' etc.
Present habitual	IMPERFECT STEM + present of 'be'/'have'	izaten naiz 'I am (habitually)'; etortzen naiz 'I come (habitually)'; ikusten dut 'I see'; kantatzen dut 'I sing'	With dynamic verbs or verbs possessing synthetic conjugation, this tense usually expresses habitual action within the present time frame, e.g. kantatzen dut, etortzen naiz.... With stative verbs lacking a simple present, this tense also expresses a present state, e.g. ikusten dut 'I (can) see', ezagutzen dut 'I am acquainted with'. The habitual sense can also be absent in kantatzen badu 'if he sings', etortzen denean 'when he comes' (= datorrenean), etc.
Future	FUTURE STEM + present of 'be'/'have'	izango naiz 'I will be'; etorriko naiz 'I will come'; erosiko ditut 'I will buy them'	This is the basic future tense for all verbs. It can also convey conjecture, most obviously with stative verbs when it is clear that no future reference is expressed, e.g. izango da for 'probably is': Egia izango da 'It is probably true.' In illocutionary contexts this tense is equivalent to English modal 'shall' or 'will', e.g. Kantatuko dut? 'Shall/Should I sing?', Lagunduko didazu? 'Will/Would/Could you help me (please)?'
Simple past	SYNTHETIC PAST	nintzen 'I was'; neukan 'I had (it)'; nekien 'I knew'	Limited to verbs that can be conjugated synthetically, with which it expresses a past state or ongoing action.
Past habitual	IMPERFECT STEM + past of 'be'/'have'	izaten nintzen 'I used to be'; etortzen nintzen 'I used to come'; ikusten nuen 'I saw, I could see'	With dynamic verbs and stative ones with synthetic conjugation, expresses habitual action in the past (etortzen nintzen, izaten nintzen). With stative verbs, past state (ikusten nuen).
Near past	PERFECT STEM + present of 'be'/'have'	etorri naiz 'I came, I have come'; ikusi dut 'I saw, I have seen'	Originally this tense expressed perfect in a present time-frame, e.g. ikusi dut 'I have seen (at some time in the past)'. Also used as a perfective past tense within the "current" time unit, usually interpreted as the day of speaking: ikusi dut 'I saw (usually understood: at some time today)'.
Remote past	PERFECT STEM + past of 'be'/'have'	etorri nintzen 'I came, I had come'; ikusi nuen 'I saw, I had seen'	Originally this expressed a pluperfect, i.e. perfect in a past time-frame, e.g. ikusi nuen 'I had seen'. Also used as a perfective past tense within a past time unit, which must be earlier than the day of speaking: ikusi nuen 'I saw (yesterday, three years ago ... )'.
Future-in-the-past	FUTURE STEM + past of 'be'/'have'	etorriko nintzen 'I would come (in indirect speech), I would have come (in conditional sentences)'; ikusiko nuen 'I would see, I would have seen'	(a) Future action in past time frame: Etorriko zela esan zuen 'He said he would come'. (b) Consequence of an unfulfilled hypothesis, e.g. Jakin izan balu, etorriko zen 'If he had known, he would have come'. (c) Conjecture about past action, e.g. Gure aurretik etorriko zen 'He probably came/must have come before us.'
Hypothetic	FUTURE STEM + hypothetic of 'be'/'have'	etorriko banintz 'if I came, if I were to come'; ikusiko banu 'if I saw, if I were to see'	Hypothetical if-clauses.
Conditional	FUTURE STEM + hypothetic potential of 'be'/'have'	etorriko nintzateke 'I would come'; ikusiko nuke 'I would see'	Consequence to a hypothetical premise (explicit or implied).
Present subjunctive	SHORT STEM + present of aorist auxiliary	etor nadin 'that I may come'; ikus dezadan 'that I may see'	Complement clauses and purpose clauses. More common in literary than colloquial style.
Present potential	SHORT STEM + present potential of aorist auxiliary	etor naiteke 'I can come'; ikus dezaket 'I can see'	Possibility or ability.
Simple imperative	SYNTHETIC IMPERATIVE	zatoz! 'come!'; emaidazu! 'give me!'	Imperative.
Compound imperative	SHORT STEM + imperative of aorist auxiliary	etor zaitez! 'come!'; egin ezazu! 'do it!'	Imperative.
Non-finite imperative	SHORT (or PERFECT) STEM	etor(ri)! 'come!'; eman! 'give!'	Imperative.

=== More periphrastic constructions ===
Some other constructions that commonly express a range of aspectual or modal notions show a greater degree of periphrasis than those considered so far. A brief selection of some of the most important of these are shown in the following table:

Some periphrastic constructions
Sense	Form	Examples
Progressive aspect ('be doing something')	-tzen/-ten + ari DA	ikasten ari naiz 'I am learning'; garbitzen ari ziren 'they were cleaning'
Volition ('want to do something')	-tu/-i/-n (etc.) + nahi DU	ikasi nahi dut 'I want to learn'; joan nahi zuen 'he wanted to go'; ikusi nahi zaitut 'I want to see you'
Necessity/obligation ('must/have to/need to do something')	-tu/-i/-n (etc.) + behar DU	joan behar dut 'I have to go'; jan behar dituzu 'you must eat them'; ikasi beharko dugu 'we will have to learn'
Ability ('can/be able to do something')	-tu/-i/-n (etc.) or -tzen/-ten + ahal DA/DU	ikasi/ikasten ahal dut 'I can learn'; etorri ahal izango zara 'you will be able to come'

== Non-finite verb forms ==
Basque verbs have a fairly wide range of non-finite forms. Morphologically these can all be derived via suffixation from the three non-finite forms presented at the beginning of this article: the participle, the verbal noun and the short stem. Apart from the short stem (which has a rather limited set of functions), all other forms are built on either the participle or the verbal noun.

=== The participle and derived forms ===
The participle and some other non-finite forms derived therefrom are as follows. To avoid repetition, mention will not be made of the use of the participle as a perfect stem in the formation of periphrastic tenses (see above).

Some non-finite forms based on the participle
Form	E.g.	Use	Examples
Participle	etorri; edan; garbitu; ireki, etc. (see above)	verbal adjective	ate ireki bat 'an open door'; ate irekiak 'open doors'; Atea irekia dago. 'The door is open.'
Participle	etorri; edan; garbitu; ireki, etc. (see above)	unmarked non-finite form (chain clauses, modal complement, citation form ... )	Ura edan eta ardoa utziko dugu. water drink.PTCP and wine leave.FUT AUX 'We'll drink the water and leave the wine.' Mahaia garbitu behar dugu. table clean.PTCP must AUX 'We must clean the table.' "Come" hitzak "etorri" esan nahi du. come word.ERG "come".PTCP say.PTCP want AUX 'The word "come" means "etorri".'
Participle	etorri; edan; garbitu; ireki, etc. (see above)	commonly replaces the short stem in all uses (western colloquial)	
Participle + -(r)ik / Participle + -ta (da)	egosirik / egosita; jakinik / jakinda; garbiturik / garbituta; beterik / beteta	stative adverbial participle	Hau jakinik/jakinda, ez nion sinetsi. this know.PTCP-ik/ta ... ... ... 'Knowing this, I did not believe him.'
Participle + -(r)ik / Participle + -ta (da)	egosirik / egosita; jakinik / jakinda; garbiturik / garbituta; beterik / beteta	participial predicate	Haragia egosirik/egosita dago. meat boil.PTCP-ik/ta is 'The meat is boiled.'
Participle + -tako (dako)	ikusitako; egindako; hartutako; hildako	adjectival (= non-finite relative)	Zuk ikusitako gizona itsua da. you.ERG see.PTCP-tako man blind is 'The man you saw (= seen by you) is blind.'
Participle + -(e)z	ikusiz; edanez; hartuz; ateraz	dynamic adverbial participle	Dirua hartuz, joan zen. money take.PTCP-z ... ... 'Taking the money, he went.'

=== The verbal noun and derived forms ===
The verbal noun and some other non-finite forms derived therefrom are as follows. Again, to avoid repetition, mention will not be made of the use of the -t(z)en form as an imperfect stem in the formation of periphrastic tenses (see above).

Some non-finite forms based on the verbal noun
Form	E.g.	Use	Examples
Verbal noun + determiner	ikaste(a); edate(a); oheratze(a); irekitze(a)	verbal noun	Berandu oheratzea txarra da. late go.to.bed.VN.ART bad.ART is 'Going to bed late is bad.' Euskara ikasteak asko lagunduko dizu. Basque learn.VN.ART.ERG much help.FUT AUX 'Learning Basque will help you a lot.'
Verbal noun + determiner	ikaste(a); edate(a); oheratze(a); irekitze(a)	complement clause	Nire lagunak nik euskara ikastea nahi du. my friend.ART.ERG I/me.ERG Basque learn.VN.ART want AUX 'My friend wants me to learn Basque.' Ardoa edatea erabaki dugu. wine drink.VN.ART decide.PTCP AUX 'We have decided to drink wine.'
Verbal noun + -ko	ikasteko; joateko; garbitzeko; irekitzeko	purpose adverbial	Liburu bat erosiko dut euskara ikasteko.... ... ... ... Basque learn.VN-ko 'I will buy a book in order to learn Basque.'
Verbal noun + -ko	ikasteko; joateko; garbitzeko; irekitzeko	complement clause	Irakasleak etxera joateko esan dit.... ... go.VN-ko say.PTCP AUX 'The teacher told me to go home.'
Verbal noun + -ko	ikasteko; joateko; garbitzeko; irekitzeko	adjectival	botilak irekitzeko tresna bat bottle.PL.ART open.VN-ko tool one 'a tool for opening bottles (with)', 'a bottle-opener'
Verbal noun + -ra	ikastera; joatera; garbitzera; irekitzera	complement of verbs of movement	Hau esatera etorri naiz. this say.VN-ra come.PTCP AUX 'I have come to say this.'
Verbal noun + -n	ikusten; joaten; garbitzen; irekitzen	complement clause	Leihoak irekitzen hasi zen. window.PL.ART open.VN-n begin.PTCP AUX 'He started opening the windows.' Joaten utziko diogu. go.VN-n let.FUT AUX 'We'll let him go.'
Verbal noun + -an	ikustean; joatean; garbitzean; irekitzean	time clause	Zu ikustean, gogoratu naiz. you see.VN-an, remember.PTCP AUX 'When I saw you (On seeing you), I remembered.'

== Compound verbs ==
Basque has a fairly large number of compound verbs of a type also known as light verb constructions, consisting of two parts. The first component is a lexical element which is often (but not always) an undeclined noun. The second is a common verb which contributes less semantic content to the construction but is the part that is conjugated, thus lending to the whole its verbal character. Details of conjugation depend on the light verb used, which may be one that has synthetic finite forms (e.g. izan), or a verb without synthetic finite forms (e.g. egin or hartu).

Some compound verbs (light verb constructions)
Light verb	Examples	Meaning	Meaning of first component
izan 'be'	bizi izan	'live'	'alive'
izan 'be'	ari izan	'be doing something'	
izan 'have'	maite izan	'love'	'dear'
izan 'have'	uste izan	'believe, think'	'opinion'
izan 'have'	nahi izan	'want'	'desire'
izan 'have'	behar izan	'need'	'necessity'
egin 'make, do'	lan egin	'work'	'work (n.)'
egin 'make, do'	hitz egin	'speak'	'word'
egin 'make, do'	lo egin	'sleep'	'sleep (n.)'
egin 'make, do'	amets egin	'dream'	'dream (n.)'
egin 'make, do'	barre egin	'laugh'	'laughter'
egin 'make, do'	negar egin	'weep'	'weeping'
egin 'make, do'	dantza egin	'dance'	'dancing' < French danse, Spanish danza ...
egin 'make, do'	kosk egin	'bite'	(onomatopoeia)

In synthetically conjugated light-verb constructions such as bizi naiz 'I live' or maite dut 'I love', care must be taken not to confuse the light verb (naiz, dut...) with tense auxiliaries; bizi naiz and maite dut are simple present forms, for example. The modal verbs nahi izan and behar izan are also of this kind. In the periphrastic tenses of compound verbs with izan, some contractions occur, e.g. in the future of bizi izan 'live', where we would expect bizi izango naiz for 'I will live', biziko naiz is more common, with -ko attached directly onto the lexical component bizi as if this were a verb.

Compound verbs, especially those with the light verb egin, offer an alternative way (besides direct derivation with -tu, as seen above) for incorporating new verbs into the language, either through the incorporation of onomatopoeic words (kosk 'bite', oka 'vomit', hurrup 'sip' or 'slurp', klik 'click' ... ) or of loanwords (dantza 'dance', salto 'jump' etc.) as lexical components.

== Verbal particles ==
A small set of modal particles, including al, ote and omen only occur immediately preceding finite forms (i.e. in front of a synthetic finite form or the synthetic part of an auxiliary verb).

Modal particles
Particle	Function	Examples
al	yes/no questions	Etorriko al da? 'Will he come?'
ote	tentative questions, 'I wonder ... '	Etorriko ote da? 'I wonder if he will come.'
omen	hearsay	Etorriko omen da. 'I have heard/They say that he will come.'

The only exception is that ote and omen are sometimes used in isolation where the ellipsis of a verb is understood. E.g. Egia ote? 'I wonder if it's true' is easily recognised by speakers to be an ellipsis of Egia ote da? Or if someone says Badator 'She's coming.' and someone else responds Omen! 'Supposedly!', this is as much as to say that the first utterance should incorporate omen, i.e. Ba omen dator 'Supposedly she is coming.'

Another set of preverbal particles consists of the affirmative particle ba- (by modern convention joined to a following finite verb form) and the negator ez. These are compatible with the modal particles, which they precede (e.g. ba omen dator in the preceding paragraph; ez al dakizu? 'don't you know?', etc.); apart from this, they too immediately precede the finite verb form.

Emphasis/negation particles
Particle	Function	Examples
ba	affirmative emphasis	Badator. 'He is coming.'
ez	negation	Ez da etorriko. 'He won't come.'

== Subordinator affixes ==
The forms of verbs cited throughout the general presentation of the finite verb system are normally those that occur in main clauses. (However, certain forms, such as the non-potential hypothetic, e.g. -litz, or the subjunctive, e.g. etor dadi-, never occur in such main-clause forms and these are therefore cited in subordinate forms such as balitz, etor dadin etc.)

In subordinate clauses, the finite verb takes a subordinator affix, i.e. a suffix or prefix which establishes (to some extent) the kind of subordination. Basically there are four such affixes, two suffixes and two prefixes, and one (and only one) of these is found in every subordinate form.

Basic subordinator morphemes
Subordinator	Form	Uses
-(e)n	suffix	relative clauses, indirect questions, other uses
-(e)la	suffix	indirect statements, circumstantial clauses
ba-	prefix	conditions
bai(t)-	prefix	explanations

Both of the suffixes, however, may take further suffixes (mostly nominal declension suffixes) which serve to further specify the type of subordination. The following table provides a brief overview of some of the main uses and forms.

Subordinator affixes
	Affix	Function	Examples
Suffixed to finite forms:	-(e)n	indirect question	Ez dakit nor den. 'I don't know who he/she is.' (Cf. Nor da? 'Who is he/she?')
Suffixed to finite forms:	-(e)n	relative clause	Hor dabilen gizona nire aita da. 'The man who is walking there is my father.' (Cf. Hor dabil gizona. 'The man is walking there.')
Suffixed to finite forms:	-(e)n	complement or purpose clause (with subjunctive)	Nahiago dut etor dadin. 'I prefer him to come.' (= 'that he may come'); Gutun hau idatzi dut irakur dezazun. 'I have written this letter in order for you to read it.'
Suffixed to finite forms:	-(e)n	first-person optative	Edan dezagun! 'Let us drink!'
Suffixed to finite forms:	-(e)nik	negation-polarity complement clause	Ez dut esan etorriko denik. 'I didn't say (that) he is going to come.'
Suffixed to finite forms:	-(e)nean	time clause, 'when'	Etortzen denean esango diot. 'When she comes I will tell her.'
Suffixed to finite forms:	-(e)nez	manner, 'as'	Lehen esan dudanez, bihar etorriko da. 'As I said before, he will come tomorrow.'; Nik dakidanez, hori ez da egia. 'As far as I know, that is not true.'
Suffixed to finite forms:	-(e)la	indirect statement	Uste dut etorriko dela. 'I think she will come.'
Suffixed to finite forms:	-(e)la	circumstance clause	Kaletik zetorrela hauxe kantatu zuen. 'As she came (walking) along the street, this is what she sang.'
Suffixed to finite forms:	-(e)la	complement clause (with subjunctive)	Hona etor dadila esango diot. 'I will tell him to come here.'
Suffixed to finite forms:	-(e)la	third-person optative	Berak jan dezala! 'Let him eat it!'
Suffixed to finite forms:	-(e)larik	time/circumstance clause ('while, when')	Ondo pasako duzu euskara ikasten ari zarelarik. 'You will have a good time while/when (you are) learning Basque.'
Suffixed to finite forms:	-(e)lako	reason clause, 'because'	Zuk deitu didazulako etorri naiz. 'I have come because you called me.'
Prefixed to finite forms:	ba-	condition clause	Euskara ikasten baduzu, euskaldunak ulertuko dituzu. 'If you learn the Basque language, you will understand the Basques.'
Prefixed to finite forms:	bai(t)-	explanatory or reason clause	Ez baituzu euskara ikasi, ez dituzu euskaldunak ulertzen. 'Since you haven't learnt Basque, you don't understand the Basques.'

== Bibliography ==
(see also the bibliography in Basque grammar)

- Allières, Jacques (1983). De la formalisation du système verbal basque. Article in Pierres Lafitte-ri omenaldia, pp. 37–39, Bilbo: Euskaltzaindia. (in French)
- Bonaparte, L-L. (1869). Le verbe basque en tableaux. London. (in French)
- Euskara Institutua, Euskal Herriko Unibertsitatea (UPV/EHU) (2013), "Euskal Adizkitegi Automatikoa" (Automatic Basque Verbal Forms Generator)
- Euskaltzaindia (1973). Aditz laguntzaile batua. (in Basque)
- Euskaltzaindia (1987). Euskal gramatika: lehen urratsak (volume 2). Bilbao: Euskaltzaindia. (in Basque)
- Euskaltzaindia (1994). Adizki alokutiboak (hikako moldea) (in Basque)
