= LaVerne Jeanne =

American linguist

LaVerne Masayesva Jeanne
- Education: PhD, MIT
- Known for: Work on the Hopi language, endangered languages. One of the first two Native Americans to have received a degree in linguistics.
- Scientific career
- Fields: Anthropologist and linguist
- Workplaces: University of Nevada at Reno
- Academic advisors: Ken Hale

LaVerne Masayesva Jeanne is an anthropologist and linguist at the University of Nevada at Reno, where she is an emerita associate professor.

She received her PhD at MIT in 1978, where she studied with linguist Ken Hale. Together with MIT her classmate Navajo Paul R. Platero, Jeanne is one of the first two Native Americans to have received a PhD degree in linguistics.

Her work has been primarily focused on the Hopi language (her mother language). Her 1978 thesis (supervised by Hale) was entitled Aspects of Hopi Grammar. She also co-authored a heavily cited article in Language with Hale, Michael Krauss, Colette Craig, and others on the state of endangered languages. She was also involved with Hopi revitalization projects.
