= Theodore B. Fernald =

American linguist (born 1960)

Theodore B. Fernald (θiədoʊɹ fɚnɑɫd)
- Born: 1960 (age 64–65)
- Education: Ohio State University (B.A., 1981; M.A., 1989); University of California, Santa Cruz (Ph.D., 1994)
- Known for: Work on Navajo reference grammar with Ellavina Perkins
- Scientific career
- Fields: Linguistics, semantics and the Navajo language
- Institutions: Chair of the Department of Linguistics, Swarthmore College
- Thesis: On the Nonuniformity of the Individual and Stage Level Effects
- Doctoral advisor: William A. Ladusaw
- Website: swarthmore.edu/profile/ted-fernald

Theodore B. Fernald is a linguist and the chair of the Department of Linguistics at Swarthmore College. He is a specialist in semantics and the Navajo language. As of 2012, he was collaborating with Ellavina Perkins under the auspices of Swarthmore and the Navajo Language Academy to produce a reference grammar of Navajo, a project which has received a major grant from the National Endowment for the Humanities. He has also served as vice-chair of the Navajo Language Academy.
