= Kenneth L. Hale =

American linguist (1934–2001)

Ken Hale
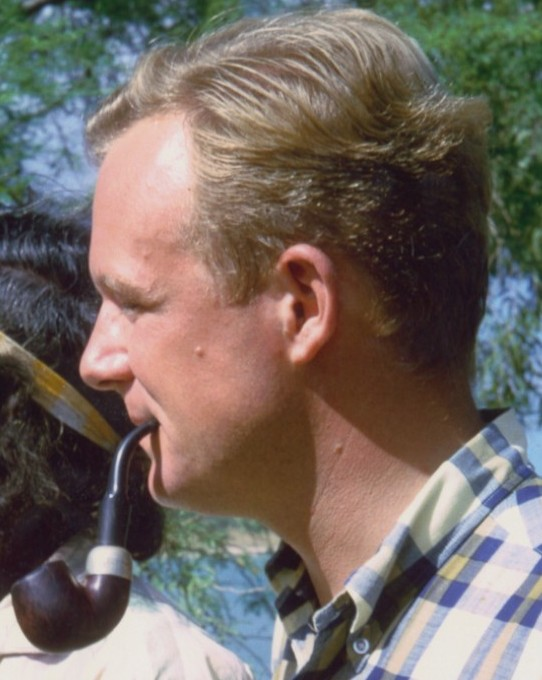
- Hale in 1967
- Born: August 15, 1934; Evanston, Illinois, U.S.
- Died: October 8, 2001 (aged 67); Lexington, Massachusetts, U.S.

Academic background
- Education: University of Arizona (B.A.); Indiana University Bloomington (M.A., Ph.D.)
- Thesis: A Papago Grammar (1959)
- Doctoral advisor: Charles F. Voegelin

Academic work
- Discipline: Linguist
- Institutions: University of Illinois Urbana-Champaign (1961–64); University of Alberta (1964); University of Arizona (1964–66); Massachusetts Institute of Technology (1967–99)
- Doctoral students: Andrew Carnie; C.-T. James Huang; LaVerne Jeanne; Lori Levin; David Nash; Paul Platero; Rudolf de Rijk; Peggy Speas; Richard Sproat; Tova Rapoport
- Website: linguistics.mit.edu/hale

Kenneth Locke Hale (August 15, 1934 – October 8, 2001) was an American linguist and professor at the Massachusetts Institute of Technology who studied a huge variety of previously unstudied and often endangered languages—especially indigenous languages of North America and Australia. Languages investigated by Hale include Navajo, O'odham, Warlpiri, Damin, and Ulwa.

Among his major contributions to linguistic theory was the hypothesis that certain languages were non-configurational, lacking the phrase structure characteristic of such languages as English.

== Life ==
Hale was born in Evanston, Illinois. When he was six, his family moved to a ranch near Canelo in southern Arizona. He attended the Verde Valley School before Hale said he was "thrown out" for being too distracted by his study of languages, before transferring to Tucson High School. As a young man, Hale was an avid bull and bronc rider. A film clip of Hale being thrown from a bull in the 1952 Tucson Rodeo was used as stock footage and is included in the film Arena.

He was a student at the University of Arizona from 1952 and obtained his PhD from Indiana University Bloomington in 1959 with a thesis on Papago grammar. He taught at the University of Illinois Urbana-Champaign in 1961-63 and at the University of Arizona, Tucson in 1963-66. From 1967 he held a sequence of appointments at the Massachusetts Institute of Technology until his retirement in 1999.

Hale was known as a polyglot who retained the ability to learn new languages with extraordinary rapidity and perfection throughout his life. As a child, in addition to English he learned both Spanish and the native American language Tohono O'odham. He learned Jemez and Hopi from his high school roommates and Navajo from his roommate at the University of Arizona. Hale managed in just one week to write up 750 pages of fieldwork notes on the Marra language alone in 1959.

He became so fluent in Warlpiri that he raised his sons Ezra and Caleb to speak Warlpiri after his return from Australia to the United States. Ezra delivered his eulogy for his father in Warlpiri.

== Linguistics ==
Among his major contributions to linguistic theory was the hypothesis that certain languages were non-configurational, lacking the phrase structure characteristic of such languages as English. Non-configurational languages, according to Hale, display a set of properties that cluster together, including free word order, unpronounced pronouns and the ability to disperse semantically related words across a sentence. Much of his research in the last two decades of the twentieth century was devoted to the development of syntactic models that could explain why these properties cluster. Hale's ideas initiated an important research program, still pursued by many contemporary linguists.

In 1960, Hale's recording of a short text from one of the few remaining native speakers of the Diyari language (spoken in northern South Australia) was the first research by a professional linguist into that language.

Hale took care to educate native speakers in linguistics so they could participate in the study of their languages. Among his students are the Tohono O'odham linguist Ofelia Zepeda, the Hopi linguist LaVerne Masayesva Jeanne, Navajo linguists Paul Platero, MaryAnn Willie, and Ellavina Tsosie Perkins, and Wampanoag linguist Jessie Little Doe Baird. Hale taught every summer in the Navajo Language Academy summer school, even in 2001 during his final illness.

In 1990 he was elected to the National Academy of Sciences.

Hale championed the importance of under-studied minority languages in linguistic study, stating that a variety of linguistic phenomena would never have been discovered if only the major world languages had been studied. He argued that any language, whether it has a hundred million native speakers or only ten, is equally likely to yield linguistic insight. Hale was also known as a champion of the speakers of minority languages, and not just of their languages, for which his MIT colleague Noam Chomsky called him "a voice for the voiceless".

== Linguistic Society of America ==
In 1994, Hale served as the president of the Linguistic Society of America. At the society's annual meeting in 1995, Hale delivered a presidential address on universal grammar and the necessity of linguistic diversity. Hale was also appointed to the LSA's Edward Sapir Professorship in 1995.

In May 2003, after Hale's death, the LSA's executive committee established a professorship in field methods in his name for the biennial Linguistic Institutes. The Ken Hale Professorship was established to address the need for documenting and preserving endangered languages, and to make courses available that prepare linguistics students to investigate poorly documented endangered languages that may not be offered in their home institutions.

In October 2016, the LSA launched a fellowship in honor of Hale to be awarded to a graduate student attendee of the Linguistic Institute pursuing a course of study in endangered language documentation. The first Ken Hale student fellowship was awarded at the 2017 Linguistic Institute to Ivan Kapitonov of the University of Melbourne.

The LSA also has a Kenneth L. Hale Award, which has been presented occasionally since 2002 to those nominated scholars who have made substantial contributions to documenting endangered or extinct languages or family of languages. The award is in honor of Hale's extensive work on preserving endangered languages.

== Personal life ==
At the age of 14, Hale met his future wife Sara "Sally" Whitaker on his parents' ranch in Canelo, Arizona, where they attended the Verde Valley School together for a year. They later became reacquainted at the University of Arizona. They had four children: Whitaker, Ian (adopted), and twins Caleb and Ezra.

Hale died at his home in Lexington, Massachusetts on October 8, 2001 at the age of 67.
