= Peggy Speas =

American linguist

Margaret "Peggy" Speas is a linguist who works on syntax, specifically evidentiality and Navajo. She is a Professor of Linguistics at the University of Massachusetts Amherst. Speas received her PhD in Linguistics from the Massachusetts Institute of Technology in 1986. Speas's work focuses on differences between elicitation, documentation and linguistic data analysis on North American Native Languages. She also works with preservation of Navajo and is a founding member of the Navajo Language Academy.

== Work with language preservation ==
Peggy Speas has been heavily involved with the preservation of North American native languages, with focus on Navajo. She is a founding member of the Navajo Language Academy, where she has served as president for two years. Founded in 1997, the Academy is a nonprofit organization which promotes the study and preservation of Navajo. In the end of 1999, she finished her term as an associate editor on the journal, Language. Speas is a co-author, with Evangeline Parsons Yazzie, on the book Diné Bizaad Bináhoo'aah: Rediscovering the Navajo Language, which is now used as the official state textbook for the Navajo language in New Mexico. In 2011, she was recognized as a Spotlight Scholar for her over 20 years of work in preserving North American native languages.

== Key publications ==
(2007) Yazzie, Evangeline Parsons, Jessie Ruffenach, Margaret Speas, and Berlyn Yazzie. Diné Bizaad Bináhoo'aah. Salina Bookshelf, 2007.

(2004) Speas, Margaret. "Evidentiality, logophoricity and the syntactic representation of pragmatic features." Lingua 114.3: 255-276.

(2003) Speas, Peggy, and Carol Tenny. "Configurational properties of point of view roles." Asymmetry in grammar 1: 315-345.

(1994) Speas, Peggy. "Null arguments in a theory of economy of projection."

(1990) Speas, Margaret. Phrase structure in natural language. Vol. 21. Springer Science & Business Media, 1990.

(1986) Speas, Margaret Jean. Adjunctions and projections in syntax. Dissertation. Massachusetts Institute of Technology Cambridge.
