= Richard Sproat =

Computational linguist

Richard William Sproat
- Education: University of California, San Diego (B.A., 1981); Massachusetts Institute of Technology (Ph.D., 1985)
- Scientific career
- Fields: Computational linguistics
- Workplaces: Google (2012–present)
- Thesis: On Deriving the Lexicon (1985)
- Doctoral advisor: Ken Hale

Richard Sproat is a computational linguist currently working for Sakana AI as a research scientist. Prior to joining Sakana AI, Sproat worked for Google between 2012 and 2024 on text normalization and speech recognition.

== Linguistics ==
Sproat graduated from Massachusetts Institute of Technology in 1985, under the supervision of Kenneth L. Hale. His PhD thesis is one of the earliest works to derive morphosyntactically complex forms from the module which produces the phonological form that realizes these morpho-syntactic expressions, one of the core ideas in Distributed Morphology.

One of Sproat's main contributions to computational linguistics is in the field of text normalization, where his work with colleagues in 2001, Normalization of non-standard words, was considered a seminal work in formalizing this component of speech synthesis systems. He has also worked on computational morphology and the computational analysis of writing systems.
