= Paul Platero =

Navajo linguist

- Born: October 5, 1942; Borrego Pass, New Mexico
- Died: November 16, 2020 (aged 78); Tohajiilee Indian Reservation, New Mexico
- Citizenship: Navajo (Diné)
- Occupation: Linguist

Academic background
- Education: Brigham Young University, Massachusetts Institute of Technology (M.S., Ph.D.)
- Thesis: Missing noun phrases in Navajo (1978)
- Doctoral advisor: Kenneth L. Hale

Academic work
- Institutions: University of New Mexico
- Main interests: Athabaskan languages

Paul Platero (October 5, 1942 – November 16, 2020) was a Navajo linguist. He was born into the Water’s Edge Clan for the Two Who Came To the Water Clan. He was a student of the late MIT linguistics professor Ken Hale. Platero earned his Ph.D. in linguistics from MIT, with a dissertation on the relative clause in Navajo.

He published articles about the syntax and grammar of Navajo, and co-edited an overview of the Athabaskan languages.

Platero taught the Navajo language at institutions including Swarthmore College and the Navajo Language Academy, and also participated in language revitalization efforts to promote the use of Navajo among Navajo youth.

== Selected works ==
- 2000 The Athabaskan Languages
