= Allocutive agreement =

Morphological feature marking the gender of the addresee

In linguistics, allocutive agreement (abbreviated AL or ALLOC) refers to a morphological feature in which the gender of an addressee is marked overtly in an utterance using fully grammaticalized markers even if the addressee is not referred to in the utterance. The term was first used by Louis Lucien Bonaparte in 1862.

== Basque ==
See also Basque verbs: Familiar forms and allocutive indices (hika).

Native Basque speakers talking in Basque about the perception of hika.

In Basque, allocutive forms are required in the verb forms of a main clause when the speaker uses the familiar (also called "intimate") pronoun hi "thou" (as opposed to formal zu "you"). This is distinct from grammatical gender as it does not involve marking nouns for gender; it is also distinct from gender-specific pronouns, such as English "he/she" or Japanese boku ("I", used by males) and atashi ("I", used by females). In Basque, allocutive agreement involves the grammatical marking of the gender of the addressee in the verb form itself.

Grammatically this is done by introducing an additional person marker in the verb form (marked AL):

Amaia n-a-iz
Amaia ABS.1SG-PRES-be
I am Amaia (speaking formally)

versus

Amaia n-a-u-n
Amaia ABS.1SG-PRES-have-AL.FEM
I am Amaia (to a female addressee, speaking informally)

Amaia n-a-u-k
Amaia ABS.1SG-PRES-have-AL.MASC
I am Amaia (to a male addressee, speaking informally)

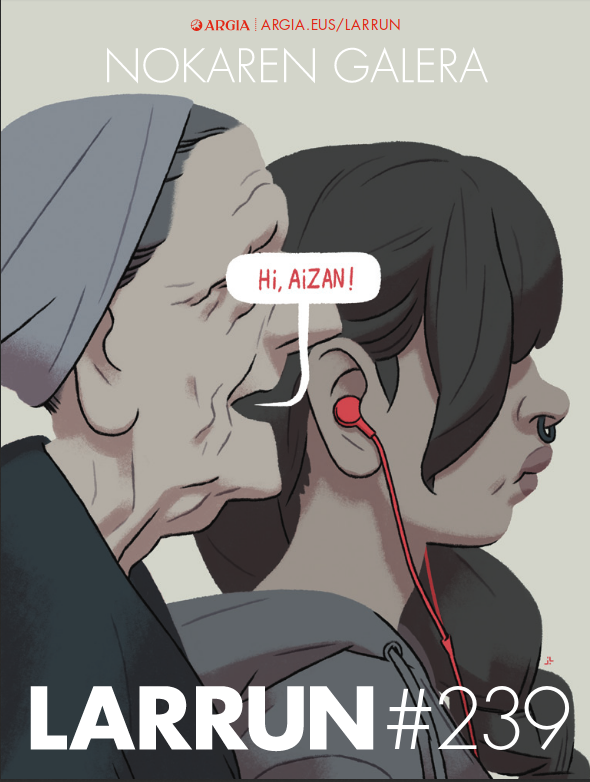
2019 Argia magazine cover about the loss of noka (feminine hika). Hi, aizan! means "Thou [female], hear!".

Eastern dialects have expanded on this by adding the polite (formerly plural) pronoun zu to the system; in some, hypocoristic palatalization converts this to -xu:

Level	"I'll go"	"you'll go"
Polite	joanen niz	joanen zira
Intermed.	joanen nuzu/nuxu	joanen xira
Familiar, masc.	joanen nuk	joanen hiz
Familiar, fem.	joanen nun	joanen hiz

Some varieties have done away with the unmarked forms except in subordinate clauses: joanen nuk / nun / nuzu vs. joanen nizela 'that I go'

Its use is diminishing, especially the feminine forms.

Basque speakers who use allocutive agreement sometimes apply the masculine forms to women, making hika a genderless marker of solidarity.

== Beja ==
Beja, a Cushitic language, has allocutive forms, marking the gender of a masculine addressee with the clitic =a and with =i for feminine addressees:

rihja =heːb =a
see.PST.3SG =1SG.ACC =AL.2SG.MASC
He saw me (said to a man)

rihja =heːb =i
see.PST.3SG =1SG.ACC =AL.2SG.FEM
He saw me (said to a woman)
