= Evangeline Parsons Yazzie =

Navajo educator and author (1952–2022)

Evangeline Parsons Yazzie (c. 1952 – May 22, 2022) was a Navajo educator and author of the first textbook adopted by the U.S. public education system to teach the Navajo language.

== Life ==
Yazzie received a Master of Arts degree in Bilingual Multicultural Education and a Doctorate in Education from Northern Arizona University (NAU) where she taught Navajo language courses for 24 years until 2014. In 2007, Yazzie co-authored a textbook for teaching the Navajo language titled Diné Bizaad Bínáhooʼaah: Rediscovering the Navajo Language along with Margaret Speas, a professor of linguistics at the University of Massachusetts. In 2008, New Mexico adopted the textbook making itself the first U.S. state to officially use any text for teaching the Navajo language in its public school system.

Following her retirement in 2014, Yazzie authored several novels about a fictional family's experience of the Long Walk of the Navajo. Yazzie died on May 22, 2022, at age 69.

== Bibliography ==
=== Non-Fiction ===
- Diné Bizaad Bínáhooʼaah : Rediscovering The Navajo Language (2007), ISBN 9781893354739, OCLC 156845819.
  - Diné Bizaad Bínáhooʼaah Audio Set 1 ISBN 9781893354760
- A Study for Reasons for Navajo Language Attrition as Perceived by Navajo Speaking Parents (1995), OCLC 77536872.

=== Her Land, Her Love series ===
A fictional account of the Long Walk of the Navajo.

1. Her Land, Her Love : Nínááníbaaʼ : the woman warrior who came home once again (2014), ISBN 9781893354968, OCLC 879377793
2. Her Enemy Her Love : Dééd Yázhi : Little Girl Warrior Who Came Home (2016), ISBN 9781893354289, OCLC 927119745
3. Her Captive Her Love : Dzánibaʼ : Young woman warrior (2018), ISBN 9781893354289, OCLC 927119745
4. Their Land, Their Love : The Return Home (2019), ISBN 9781893354326, OCLC 1078778700

=== Other Fiction ===
- Dzání Yázhí Naazbaaʼ : Little Woman Warrior Who Came Home : a story of the Navajo Long Walk (2005), ISBN 9781893354555, OCLC 57201776
