= Ellavina Perkins =

American linguist

Ellavina Tsosie Perkins (born 1940) is an independent linguist and scholar of the Navajo language.

She was a student of the late MIT linguistics professor Ken Hale. She received her Ph.D. from the University of Arizona; her dissertation dealt with word order and lexical scope in Navajo.

Perkins is on the board of directors of the Navajo Language Academy, under the auspices of which she is currently collaborating with Theodore B. Fernald on the Navajo Grammar Project, which aims to produce a reference grammar of the Navajo Language. The project received a major grant from the National Endowment for the Humanities
