= Rudolf de Rijk =

Dutch linguist (1937–2003)

Rudolf Pieter Gerardus de Rijk (24 March 1937, Amsterdam – 15 June 2003, Amsterdam) was a Dutch linguist, a specialist in Basque language.

He received a master's degree in linguistics at the University of Amsterdam and his Ph.D. at Massachusetts Institute of Technology, with the thesis Studies in Basque Syntax: Relative Clauses, under the direction of Kenneth L. Hale. His thesis had an impact of bringing the Basque language to the attention of generative syntacticians.

He taught briefly at the University of Chicago and then, until his retirement in 2002, at Leiden University. His De Lingua Vasconum: Selected Writings were published in 1998 as supplement XLIII to the Anuario del Seminario de Filologa Vasca "Julio de Urquijo" (University of the Basque Country, Bilbao). He was an honorary member of the Basque Language Academy.

On November 29, 2002, the University of the Basque Country awarded him an honorary doctorate, citing him as el vascólogo más importante de la comunidad lingüística internacional ["The most important bascologist in the international linguistic community"] and presenting him with a Festschrift containing articles by 42 authors whose work was informed by his own.

His life's work is the 1400-page descriptive grammar of Standard Basque: Standard Basque: A Progressive Grammar (MIT Press, 2008).
