= Intensive word form =

In grammar, an intensive word form is one which denotes stronger, more forceful, or more concentrated action relative to the root on which the intensive is built. Intensives are usually lexical formations, but there may be a regular process for forming intensives from a root. Intensive formations, for example, existed in Proto-Indo-European, and in many of the Semitic languages.

== Morphological devices ==
Certain prefixes and suffixes may be used as intensifiers. English language: "preeminent" (pre+eminent) or Latin language: excellentissimus (excellens + -issimus)

== Grammatical categories ==
Intensives generally function as adverbs before the word or phrase that they modify. For example, bloody well, as in "I will bloody well do it," is a commonly used intensive adverb in Great Britain.

Intensives also can function as postpositive adjectives. An example in American English today is "the heck", e.g. "What the heck is going on here?" All intensives are expletives that can be omitted without changing the meaning of the sentence albeit with less intensity. Many modern-day intensives are generally considered vulgar or otherwise inappropriate in polite conversation, such as "the hell" or "the fuck". In the mid-19th century, "in tarnation" was common. Polite alternatives include on earth or in heaven's name.

== Examples of intensifiers across languages ==
In American English, the usage of "this/that" has become common in intensive form. The usage of "this/that" as intensifiers can be compared to the intensifier "so", since they all belong in the booster category of intensifiers, that is, intensifiers used to describe a high claim of intensity. An example sentence of this would be, "I shouldn't be this tired." which carries similar intensity as the sentence, "I am so tired.".

Hebrew uses intensifiers to show distinction between the pi`el (intensive) and hiph`il (causative) binyans.

Latin had verbal prefixes e- and per- that could be more or less freely added onto any verb and variously added such meanings as "To put a great deal of effort into doing something". For example, "ructa" (burp) compared to "eructa" (belch). When the same prefixes, especially per, were added to adjectives, the resulting meaning was very X or extremely X.
