= Argia (magazine) =

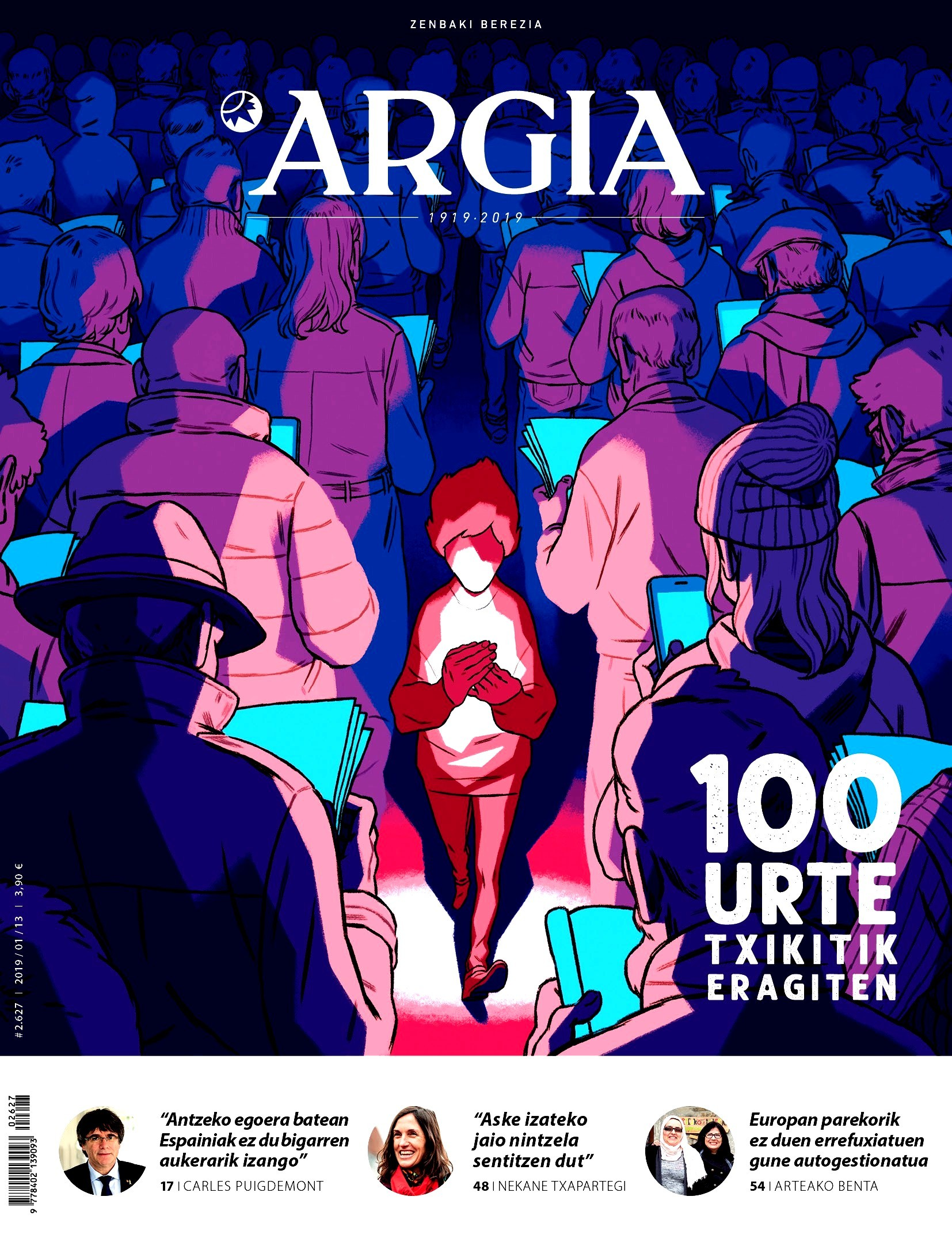
- Categories: Newsmagazine
- Frequency: Weekly
- Publisher: Komunikazio Biziagoa S.A.L.
- First issue: 1 January 1919; 107 years ago
- Country: Basque Country
- Language: Basque
- Website: argia.eus

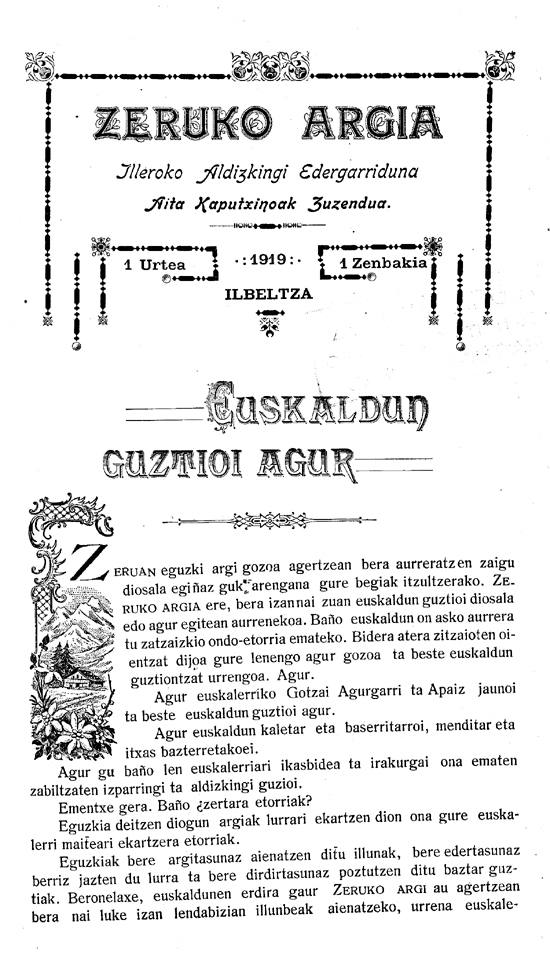
Zeruko Argia

Argia is a weekly news magazine published in the Basque language, the oldest one still in circulation. Their main office is in Lasarte-Oria, Basque Country. Its name was Zeruko Argia from 1919 to 1921 and from 1963 to 1980, and Argia from 1921 to 1936 and from 1980 to present. It had to cease its activity because of the Spanish Civil War in 1936, and it could not be published again until 1963, when Francoist Spain lifted its ban on Basque-language publications.

It was the journalists working in Argia that in 1990 created Euskaldunon Egunkaria, the Basque newspaper that in 2003 was closed down on orders from Juan del Olmo — a Spanish judge in the Audiencia Nacional — on grounds of accusations driven by a "narrow and erroneous view according to which everything that has to do with the Basque language and with culture in that language is promoted and/or controlled by ETA."
