= Navajo Language Academy =

Non-profit education organization

The Navajo Language Academy (NLA; Navajo Diné Bizaad Naalkaah) is a non-profit educational and advocacy organization which focuses on the Navajo language.

== Overview ==
The Navajo Language Academy grew out of workshops by Kenneth L. Hale in the 1970s and was proposed as a result of the Second Navajo Orthography Conference in 1978. It consists of Navajo linguists and other interested people. It supports scientific research on the Navajo language and on teaching Navajo people, especially language teachers, how to carry out linguistic research and to use existing reference materials. This focus differs from related organizations as the Navajo Nation Division of Diné Education, Diné College, and the Navajo Language Teachers Association.

The NLA organizes efforts of linguists and language instructors to train teachers of Navajo. Summer workshops on the Navajo language, applied linguistics, and general linguistics have been offered every summer since 1998. Undergraduate-level courses are offered for college credit.

The Board of Directors of the NLA includes Navajo linguist Ellavina Perkins. The NLA maintains a comprehensive bibliography on Navajo linguistics, available on its web site, and holds the archive of the Navajo material of linguist Ken Hale.
