= 2018 Basque Pelota World Championships =

World championship

- Logo of competition

Tournament information
- Location: Barcelona, Spain
- Dates: 14–20 October
- Administrator: FIPV
- Teams: 14
- Website: mundialpilota2018.org

Final positions
- Champions: France
- 1st runners-up: Spain
- 2nd runners-up: Mexico

The 2018 Basque Pelota World Championships were the 18th edition of the Basque Pelota World Championships organized by the FIPV.

== Participating nations ==
- Argentina (10)
- Bolivia (4)
- Brazil (1)
- Chile (7)
- Cuba (11)
- El Salvador (2)
- France (14)
- Guatemala (1)
- Italy (1)
- Mexico (12)
- Peru (2)
- Spain (14)
- United States (5)
- Uruguay (8)

== Events ==
A total of 14 events were disputed, in 4 playing areas.

Trinquete, 5 events disputed

Event	Gold	Silver	Bronze
Hand-pelota (individual)	(France) Baptiste Ducassou	(Spain) Eneko Maiz	(Mexico) Mauricio López
Hand-pelota (pairs)	(France) Peio Larralde; Bixintxo Bilbao	(Mexico) Orlando Díaz; Martín Cabello	(Spain) Javier Luquin; Luis Sánchez
Paleta goma (men's)	(Argentina) Facundo Andreasen; Santiago Andreasen	(France) Stephane Suzanne; Patxi Guillenteguy	(Spain) Aritz Larrarte; Sebastián Martínez
Paleta goma (women's)	(France) Stephanie Leiza; Maritxu Housset	(Argentina) Sabrina Andrade; María García	(Mexico) Laura Puentes; Dulce Figueroa
Paleta cuero	(Spain) Iñigo Ansó; Miguel Fernández de Lascoiti	(France) Denis Larretche; Valentin Cambos	(Uruguay) Andrés Pintos; Gastón Dufau

Fronton (30 m), 4 events disputed

Event	Gold	Silver	Bronze
Paleta goma (men's)	(Mexico) Arturo Rodríguez	(France) Kevin Pucheux	(Argentina) Federico Isaía
Paleta goma (women's)	(France) Aizkoa Iturrino; Maritxu Housset	(Spain) Amaia Irazustabarrena; Maider Mendizabal	(Mexico) Laura Puentes; Dulce Figueroa
Frontenis (men's)	(Mexico) Carlos Torres; Héctor Rodríguez	(Spain) Gustavo Vidal; Pablo Peñate	(France) Aritz Azpeitia; Theo Pucheux
Frontenis (women's)	(Mexico) Guadalupe Hernández; Ariana Cepeda	(France) Louise Coyos; Claire Dutaret-Bordagaray	(Cuba) Lisandra Lima; Yasmary Medina

Fronton (36 m), 4 events disputed

Event	Gold	Silver	Bronze
Hand-pelota (individual)	(Spain) Javier Zabala	(Mexico) David Álvarez	(France) Patxi Etchegaray
Hand-pelota (pairs)	(Spain) Xabier Sancho; Aitor Gorrotxategi	(France) Yves Salaberry; Xabi Mendy	(Mexico) Juan Medina; Rafael Morales
Paleta cuero	(Spain) Erik Zubiri; Javier Labiano	(France) Benoit Chatellier; Pierre Casteran	(Cuba) Armando Chappi; Yoan Torreblanca
Pala corta	(France) Dan Necol; Sylvain Brefel	(Spain) Esteban Gaubeka; Emiliano Skufca	(Argentina) Pablo Fusto; Juan Firpo

Fronton (54 m), 1 event disputed

Event	Gold	Silver	Bronze
Jai alai	(Spain) Aritz Erkiaga; Jonatan Hernández	(France) Jean Olharan; Nicolas Etcheto	(France) Patxi Tamborindeguy; Eric Irastorza

== Medal table ==
Rank	Nation	Gold	Silver	Bronze	Total
1	France	5	7	3	15
2	Spain (host nation)	5	4	2	11
3	Mexico	3	2	4	9
4	Argentina	1	1	2	4
5	Cuba	0	0	2	2
6	Uruguay	0	0	1	1
