= 1974 Basque Pelota World Championships =

World championships in Basque pelota

- Tournament poster

Tournament information
- Location: Montevideo, Uruguay
- Dates: November–December
- Administrator: FIPV
- Teams: 8

Final positions
- Champions: Argentina
- 1st runners-up: France
- 2nd runners-up: Spain

The 1974 Basque Pelota World Championships were the 7th edition of the Basque Pelota World Championships organized by the FIPV.

== Participating nations ==
- Argentina
- Chile
- France
- Mexico
- Philippines
- Spain
- Uruguay
- USA

== Events ==
A total of 12 events were disputed, in 4 playing areas.

Trinquete, 5 events disputed

| Event | Gold | Silver | Bronze |
|---|---|---|---|
| Hand-pelota (individual) | (France) J. Laduche | (Uruguay) C. Iraizoz | (Spain) D. Echandi |
| Hand-pelota (pairs) | (France) J. Dargel, J. Urdampilleta | (Spain) J. M.Goicoechea, J. Echeveste | (Uruguay) L. Castillo, J. Iraizoz |
| Paleta goma (men's) | (Argentina) A. Olite, H. Porcio | (Uruguay) G. Arcaus, J. Valverde | (France) F. Elduayen, F. Dibarrat |
| Paleta cuero | (Argentina) J. Utge, R. Bizzozero | (Uruguay) C. Bernal, N. Iroldi | (Spain) D. Alcorta, E. Portu |
| Xare | (Argentina) H. Leyenda, R. Bizzozero | (Uruguay) C. Pose, R. Alfieri | (France) Labat, J. Junca |

Fronton (30 m), 2 events disputed

| Event | Gold | Silver | Bronze |
|---|---|---|---|
| Paleta goma (men's) | (Argentina) A. Sether, D. Olite | (Mexico) J. Becerra, R. Rendon | (Uruguay) A. Martinez, A. Arrospide |
| Frontenis (men's) | (Mexico) M. Becerra, A. Becerra | (Argentina) H. Porcio, A. Armas | (Uruguay) A. Martinez, D. Martinez |

Fronton (36 m), 4 events disputed

| Event | Gold | Silver | Bronze |
|---|---|---|---|
| Hand-pelota (individual) | (Spain) L. M.Alberdi | (France) G. Urrutia | (Mexico) M. Jimenez |
| Hand-pelota (pairs) | (Spain) Retegui III, Del Pozo | (France) R. Dugourg, M. Etcheverry | (Mexico) R. Tovar, A. Saldaña |
| Paleta cuero | (Argentina) J. Utge, R. Bizzozero | (Uruguay) Bernal, Bell | (Spain) F. Larumbe, F. Casado |
| Pala corta | (France) J. Barrotaran, A. Ithurbide | (Argentina) J. Utge, R. Bizzozero | (Spain) A. Ancizu, V. Esparza |

Fronton (54 m), 1 event disputed

| Event | Gold | Silver | Bronze |
|---|---|---|---|
| Jai alai | (France) J. Abeberry, J. Irazoqui | (Mexico) A. Zubikarai, A. Andrade | (Spain) I. Rodriguez, J. Calzacorta |

== Medal table ==
| Rank | Nation | Gold | Silver | Bronze | Total |
|---|---|---|---|---|---|
| 1 | Argentina | 5 | 2 | 0 | 7 |
| 2 | France | 4 | 2 | 2 | 8 |
| 3 | Spain | 2 | 1 | 5 | 8 |
| 4 | Mexico | 1 | 2 | 2 | 5 |
| 5 | Uruguay (host nation) | 0 | 5 | 3 | 8 |
