= 1970 Basque Pelota World Championships =

- Tournament poster

Tournament information
- Location: San Sebastián, Spain
- Dates: 18–27 September
- Administrator: FIPV
- Teams: 5+

Final positions
- Champions: Spain
- 1st runners-up: France
- 2nd runners-up: Argentina

The 1970 Basque Pelota World Championships were the 6th edition of the Basque Pelota World Championships organized by the FIPV.

== Participating nations ==
- Argentina
- France
- Mexico
- Spain
- Uruguay
- Others

== Events ==
A total of 12 events were disputed, in 4 playing areas.

Trinquete, 5 events disputed

Event	Gold	Silver	Bronze
Hand-pelota (individual)	(France) Artola	(Spain) Echeveste	(Uruguay) R. Castillo
Hand-pelota (pairs)	(France) Laduche, Harocarene	(Spain) Tranche, Balda	(Uruguay) Carli, A. Castillo
Paleta goma (men's)	(Argentina) A. Olite, J. Utge	(Uruguay) J. Bosco, J. Valverde	(France) Haramboure, Hirigoyen
Paleta cuero	(Uruguay) Bernal, Iroldi	(Argentina) Sether, Bizzozero	(Spain) Aguirre, Vega
Xare	(Argentina) R. Elias, R. Bizzozero	(Uruguay) Maz Ayala, Alfieri	(France) Labat, Hourregue

Fronton (30 m), 2 events disputed

Event	Gold	Silver	Bronze
Paleta goma (men's)	(Mexico) J. Becerra, Rendon	(Argentina) Armas, Olite	(Uruguay) Bernal, Bell
Frontenis (men's)	(Mexico) Loaiza, Hernando	(Spain) Irigay, Lersundi	(Argentina) Olite, Armas

Fronton (36 m), 4 events disputed

Event	Gold	Silver	Bronze
Hand-pelota (individual)	(Spain) Maiz	(France) Minondo	(Mexico) F. Medina
Hand-pelota (pairs)	(Spain) Sacristan, Iruzubieta	(France) Mougica, Sallaberry	(Mexico) Izquierdo, Tovar
Paleta cuero	(Spain) Ancizu, Reizabal	(Argentina) Sether, Utge	(France) Berrotaran, Clairacq
Pala corta	(Spain) Mendiluce, Llorca	(France) Berrotaran, Millet	(Mexico) Salazar, Sanchez

Fronton (54 m), 1 event disputed

Event	Gold	Silver	Bronze
Jai alai	(France) Camy, Furneau	(Spain) E. Mirapeix, J. M. Mirapeix	(Mexico) Zubikarai, Hamui

== Medal table ==
Rank	Nation	Gold	Silver	Bronze	Total
1	Spain (host nation)	4	4	1	9
2	France	3	3	3	9
3	Argentina	2	3	1	6
4	Mexico	2	0	4	6
5	Uruguay	1	2	3	6
