= 2022 Basque Pelota World Championships =

World championship

Tournament information
- Location: Biarritz, France
- Dates: 23–29 October
- Administrator: FIPV
- Teams: 36
- Website: mondialbiarritz2022.com

Final positions
- Champions: Spain
- 1st runners-up: France
- 2nd runners-up: Mexico

The 2022 Basque Pelota World Championships were the 19th edition of the Basque Pelota World Championships organized by the FIPV.

== Participating nations ==
1. Argentina
2. Australia
3. Belgium
4. Bolivia
5. Bosnia and Herzegovina
6. Brazil
7. Cambodia
8. Canada
9. Chile
10. China
11. Colombia
12. Costa Rica
13. Cuba
14. Dominican Republic
15. El Salvador
16. France
17. Guatemala
18. Guinea
19. Ireland
20. Italy
21. Japan
22. Mexico
23. Netherlands
24. Nigeria
25. Peru
26. Portugal
27. South Africa
28. South Korea
29. Spain
30. Togo
31. Turkey
32. Uganda
33. United States
34. Uruguay
35. Venezuela
36. Vietnam

The player of Guinea did not appear.

== Events ==
A total of 18 events were disputed, in 4 playing areas.

Trinquete, 6 events disputed.

Event	Gold	Silver	Bronze
Hand-pelota (individual)	(France) Ducassou	(Spain) Sánchez	(Mexico) López
Hand-pelota (pairs)	(France) Larralde, Ducassou	(Spain) Maiz, Luquin	(Mexico) Moreno, Mundo
Paleta goma (men's)	(Argentina) Andreasen, Villegas	(Spain) Monserrat, Martínez	(France) Pucheux, Guillenteguy
Paleta goma (women's)	(France) Iturrino, Housset	(Argentina) Pintos, Calderón	(Spain) Ibañez, Murillo
Paleta cuero	(France) Larretche, Cambos	(Argentina) Maldonado, Maldonado	(Spain) Beunza, Anso
Xare	(France) Laberdesque, Driolet	(Spain) Lopetegui, Moncada	(United States) Bovis, Etcheverry

Fronton (30 m), 4 events disputed.

Event	Gold	Silver	Bronze
Paleta goma (men's)	(Spain) Vidal	(Mexico) Molina	(France) Pucheux
Paleta goma (women's)	(Spain) Ardanaz	(Mexico) Puentes	(France) Guillenteguy
Frontenis (men's)	(Spain) Molina, Vidal	(United States) Espinoza, Espinoza	(Mexico) Cruz, Olivera
Frontenis (women's)	(Mexico) Placito, Miranda	(Spain) Aguillo, Barona	(Cuba) Darriba, Medina

Fronton (36 m), 4 events disputed.

Event	Gold	Silver	Bronze
Hand-pelota (individual)	(Mexico) Álvarez	(Spain) Retegi	(France) Iroiz
Hand-pelota (pairs)	(Spain) Labaka, Merino	(Mexico) González, Medina	(France) Mendiburu, Delamare
Paleta cuero	(Spain) Ayarra, Labiano	(France) Hourcourigaray, Chatellier	(Argentina) Hernán, Fernández
Pala corta	(Spain) Baeza, Ibañez	(Argentina) Fusto, Firpo	(France) Necol, Brefel

Fronton (54 m), 2 events disputed.

Event	Gold	Silver	Bronze
Jai alai (men's)	(Spain) Erkiaga, López	(Spain) Goikoetxea, Lekerikabeaskoetxea	(France) Olharan, Minvielle
Jai alai (women's)	(Spain) Ortiz de Mendivil, Lizardi	(Spain) Arakistain, Lijardi	(France) Sorozabal, Laugier

Frontball, 2 events disputed.

Event	Gold	Silver	Bronze
Frontball (men's)	(Spain) Iker Espinal	(France) Yohan Eguiabehere	(Mexico) Abraham Moctezuma
Frontball (women's)	(Mexico) Itzel Reyes	(Spain) Miriam Arrilaga	(France) Marie Goyenetche

== Medal table ==
Rank	Nation	Gold	Silver	Bronze	Total
1	Spain	9	9	2	20
2	France (host nation)	5	2	9	16
3	Mexico	3	3	4	10
4	Argentina	1	3	1	5
5	United States	0	1	1	2
6	Cuba	0	0	1	1
