= 1966 Basque Pelota World Championships =

- Tournament poster

Tournament information
- Location: Montevideo, Uruguay
- Dates: December–
- Administrator: FIPV
- Teams: 7+

Final positions
- Champions: France
- 1st runners-up: Mexico
- 2nd runners-up: Spain

The 1966 Basque Pelota World Championships were the 5th edition of the Basque Pelota World Championships organized by the FIPV.

== Participating nations ==
- Argentina
- Chile
- Cuba
- France
- Mexico
- Spain
- Uruguay
- Others

== Events ==
A total of 12 events were disputed, in 4 playing areas.

Trinquete, 5 events disputed

Event	Gold	Silver	Bronze
Hand-pelota (individual)	(France) F. Daguerre	(Spain) D. Balda	-
Hand-pelota (pairs)	(France) M. Etchegoin, E. Detchart	(Spain) J. Bruno, J. Eguiguren	-
Paleta goma (men's)	(Argentina) J. Andrade, R. Ibarra	(Uruguay) J. Valverde, Canccavillani	-
Paleta cuero	(Uruguay) C. Bernal, N. Iroldi	(Argentina) A. Sether, R. Bizzocero	-
Xare	(Argentina) J. Andrade, R. Elias	(Uruguay) Pereira, Alfieri	-

Fronton (30 m), 2 events disputed

Event	Gold	Silver	Bronze
Paleta goma (men's)	(Mexico) J. Becerra, R. Rendon	(Argentina) D. Tripiechio, J. Goyheche	-
Frontenis (men's)	(Mexico) J. Loaiza, J. Etcheverria	(Uruguay) I. Purstcher, H. Germone	-

Fronton (36 m), 4 events disputed

Event	Gold	Silver	Bronze
Hand-pelota (individual)	(France) R. Mugica	(Spain) J.del Val	-
Hand-pelota (pairs)	(Spain) R. Madrid, L. Nalda	(Mexico) I. Hernandez, R. Tovar	-
Paleta cuero	(France) P. Bareits, B. Bareits	(Spain) L. Unanue, S. Mendiluce	-
Pala corta	(Spain) S. Mendiluce, L. Unanue	(Mexico) M. Salazar, R. Sanchez	-

Fronton (54 m), 1 event disputed

Event	Gold	Silver	Bronze
Jai alai	(Mexico) J, Hamui, A. Zubikarai	(Spain) E. Mirapeix, J. M. Mirapeix	-

The Xare discipline in the Trinquete did not involve any medal for world the championship title because it only involved two contenders: Argentina and Uruguay. It solely consisted of an exhibition tournament.

== Medal table ==
Rank	Nation	Gold	Silver	Bronze	Total
1	France	4	0	-	4
2	Mexico	3	2	-	5
3	Spain	2	5	-	7
4	Argentina	1	2	-	3
5	Uruguay (host nation)	1	2	-	3
