= 1978 Basque Pelota World Championships =

World championships in Basque pelota

- Tournament poster

Tournament information
- Location: Biarritz, France
- Dates: September–
- Administrator: FIPV
- Teams: 9

Final positions
- Champions: Spain
- 1st runners-up: Argentina
- 2nd runners-up: France

The 1978 Basque Pelota World Championships were the 8th edition of the Basque Pelota World Championships organized by the FIPV.

== Participating nations ==
- Argentina
- Chile
- France
- Italy
- Mexico
- Spain
- United States
- Uruguay
- Venezuela

== Events ==
A total of 12 events were disputed, in 4 playing areas.

Trinquete, 5 events disputed

Event	Gold	Silver	Bronze
Hand-pelota (individual)	(France) Dargel	(Uruguay) Iraizoz	(United States) Bidart
Hand-pelota (pairs)	(France) Berhouet, Houseet	(Spain) Echandi, Echeveste	(Uruguay) Castillo, Paz
Paleta goma (men's)	(Argentina) Tarducci, Bazan	(Uruguay) Martinez, Iroldi	(France) Elduayen, Dibarart
Paleta cuero	(Uruguay) C. Bernal, N. Iroldi	(Argentina) A. Sether, R. Bizzozero	(France) Alexander, Sallaberry
Xare	(Argentina) H. Leyenda, R. Bizzozero	(France) Leon, Camino	(Uruguay) Posse, Alfieri

Fronton (30 m), 2 events disputed

Event	Gold	Silver	Bronze
Paleta goma (men's)	(Argentina) Armas, Jaurena	(Mexico) Becerra, Flores	(Chile) Córdoba, Sáez
Frontenis (men's)	(Mexico) Marron, Chavez	(Argentina) Armas, Porcio	(Spain) Fite, Suarez

Fronton (36 m), 4 events disputed

Event	Gold	Silver	Bronze
Hand-pelota (individual)	(Spain) Andueza VI	(France) Zubizarreta	(Mexico) Vazquez
Hand-pelota (pairs)	(Spain) Rico III, Martinez	(France) Diribarne, Zubizarreta	(Mexico) Izquierdo, Izquierdo
Paleta cuero	(Mexico) M. Beltran, J. Musi	(Argentina) H. Leyenda, R. Bizzozero	(France) J. P. Milhet, Itoiz
Pala corta	(Spain) Ancizu, Ezponda	(Mexico) Hernandez, J. Musi	(France) Labat, Talgorn

Fronton (54 m), 1 event disputed

Event	Gold	Silver	Bronze
Jai alai	(Spain) Aperribay, Totorica	(Mexico) A. Elorduy, E. Elorduy	(France) Echeverria, Irigaray

== Medal table ==
Rank	Nation	Gold	Silver	Bronze	Total
1	Spain	4	1	1	6
2	Argentina	3	3	0	6
3	France (host nation)	2	3	5	10
4	Mexico	2	3	2	7
5	Uruguay	1	2	2	5
6	Chile	0	0	1	1
6	USA	0	0	1	1
