= 1952 Basque Pelota World Championships =

- Tournament poster

Tournament information
- Location: San Sebastián, Spain
- Dates: 28 August–September
- Administrator: FIPV
- Teams: 8

Final positions
- Champions: France
- 1st runners-up: Spain
- 2nd runners-up: Argentina

The 1952 Basque Pelota World Championships were the 1st edition of the Basque Pelota World Championships organized by the FIPV.

== Participating nations ==
- Argentina
- Cuba
- France
- Italy
- Mexico
- Philippines
- Spain
- Uruguay

== Events ==
A total of 17 events were disputed, in 5 playing areas.

Trinquete, 4 events disputed

Event	Gold	Silver	Bronze
Hand-pelota (individual)	(France) M. Etchemendy	(Uruguay) A. Iraizos	-
Hand-pelota (pairs)	(France) R. Harcaut, P. Espel	(Spain) I. Aguirre, San Jose	-
Paleta cuero	(Argentina) P. Etcheverry, J. Diaz	(Uruguay) A. Pardo, J. Martinez	-
Xare	(Argentina) R. Elias, J. Labat	(Uruguay) N. Vigo, J. Barbat	-

Fronton (30 m), 1 event disputed

Event	Gold	Silver	Bronze
Frontenis (men's)	(Mexico) J. Nuñez, J. Garibay	(Argentina) R. Novoa, R. Morganti	-

Fronton (36 m), 5 events disputed

Event	Gold	Silver	Bronze
Hand-pelota (individual)	(Spain) J. Esparza	(Uruguay) L. Debia	-
Hand-pelota (pairs)	(France) D. Olhasso, M. Etchemendy	(Spain) D. Arbizu, S. Echeverria	-
Paleta cuero	(Argentina) S. Bellozo, A. Abadia	(France) P. Bareits, B. Clairacq	-
Pala corta	(Spain) JC. Artola, S. Aristi	(France) P. Bareits, B. Clairacq	-
Frontenis (men's)	(Spain) Vega de Seoane, Eguía	(Philippines) R. Nieto e Hidalgo, V. Teus y Menéndez (Tito)	-

Fronton (54 m), 2 events disputed

Event	Gold	Silver	Bronze
Jai alai	(Spain) M. Balet, J. Balet	(Mexico) M. Barrera, F. Pareyon	-
Pala larga	(Spain) F. Castro, F. Salaverri	(Mexico) F. Perochena, R. Molina	-

Plaza Libre, 5 events disputed (Note: There is no record of the name of the players or the modalities that were played in the plaza libre. The only information available is that 5 events were played between France and Spain, and that France won all 5.) (Note: France: Pierre and Bernard Bareits, Jacques Errecalde.)

Event	Gold	Silver	Bronze
Unknown	(France)	(Spain)	-
Unknown	(France)	(Spain)	-
Unknown	(France)	(Spain)	-
Unknown	(France)	(Spain)	-
Unknown	(France)	(Spain)	-

== Medal table ==
Rank	Nation	Gold	Silver	Bronze	Total
1	France	8	2	-	10
2	Spain (host nation)	5	7	-	12
3	Argentina	3	1	-	4
4	Mexico	1	2	-	3
5	Uruguay	0	4	-	4
6	Philippines	0	1	-	1
