= 1958 Basque Pelota World Championships =

- Tournament poster

Tournament information
- Location: Biarritz, France
- Dates: 11–21 September
- Administrator: FIPV
- Teams: 9+

Final positions
- Champions: France
- 1st runners-up: Spain
- 2nd runners-up: Argentina

The 1958 Basque Pelota World Championships were the 3rd edition of the Basque Pelota World Championships organized by the FIPV.

== Participating nations ==
- Argentina
- Cuba
- France
- Italy
- Mexico
- Philippines
- Spain
- United States
- Uruguay
- Others

== Events ==
A total of 17 events were disputed, in 5 playing areas.

Trinquete, 5 events disputed

Event	Gold	Silver	Bronze
Hand-pelota (individual)	(Spain) Bengoechea	(Uruguay) A. Iraizoz	-
Hand-pelota (pairs)	(France) Harcaut, Ferrerres	(Spain) Forfait,	-
Paleta goma (men's)	(Argentina) Olite, Dellecassagrande	(Uruguay) Bernal, Bell	-
Paleta cuero	(France) P. Barreits, J. Clairacq	(Argentina) Martinez, J. Labat	-
Xare	(Argentina) Elias, R. Labat	(Uruguay) Pereira, Mas de Ayala	-

Fronton (30 m), 2 events disputed

Event	Gold	Silver	Bronze
Paleta goma (men's)	(Argentina) Sether, Gonzalez	(Uruguay) Cevi, Telechea	-
Frontenis (men's)	(Mexico) Beltran, Garibay	(Argentina) Sether, Salvador	-

Fronton (36 m), 5 events disputed

Event	Gold	Silver	Bronze
Hand-pelota (individual)	(Spain) Pascual	(France) Etchart	-
Hand-pelota (pairs)	(Spain) Ezpondoa, Berasaluce	(France) Etchart, Larroque	-
Paleta cuero	(France) P. Bareits, P. Clairacq	(Spain) Azpitarte, Aristi	-
Pala corta	(Spain) Sola, Aristi	(France) P. Bareits, J. Clairacq	-
Frontenis (men's)	(Mexico) Salazar, Sánchez	(Spain) Castro, Vidal	-

Fronton (54 m), 2 events disputed

Event	Gold	Silver	Bronze
Jai alai	(Mexico) Azcue, Hamui	(Spain) M. Balet, Chimela	-
Pala larga	(Spain) Gurruchaga, Huarte	(Mexico) Ramos, Prado	-

Plaza Libre, 3 events disputed

Event	Gold	Silver	Bronze
Hand-pelota (pairs)	(France) Inda, Vivier, Hauret	(Spain) Yaniz, Ituarte	-
Pala larga	(France) P. Bareits, B. Bareits	(Spain) Unanue, Beraza	-
Rebote	(France)	(Spain)	-

== Medal table ==
Rank	Nation	Gold	Silver	Bronze	Total
1	France (host nation)	6	3	-	9
2	Spain	5	7	-	12
3	Argentina	3	2	-	5
4	Mexico	3	1	-	4
5	Uruguay	0	4	-	4
