= 2014 Basque Pelota World Championships =

World championships in Basque pelota

Tournament information
- Location: Zinacantepec, Mexico
- Dates: 11–21 September
- Administrator: FIPV
- Teams: 18
- Website: www.pelotavasca2014.mx

Final positions
- Champions: Mexico
- 1st runners-up: Spain
- 2nd runners-up: France

The 2014 Basque Pelota World Championships were the 17th edition of the Basque Pelota World Championships organized by the FIPV.

== Participating nations ==
- Argentina (14)
- Bolivia (3)
- Brazil (7)
- Canada (3)
- Chile (10)
- Costa Rica (4)
- Cuba (9)
- El Salvador (4)
- France (15)
- Guatemala (3)
- Italy (1)
- Mexico (14)
- Nicaragua (2)
- Peru (4)
- Spain (15)
- United States (11)
- Uruguay (6)
- Venezuela (13)

== Events ==
A total of 15 events were disputed, in 4 playing areas.

Trinquete, 6 events disputed

Event	Gold	Silver	Bronze
Hand-pelota (individual)	(Mexico) Heriberto López	(France) Jean Marc Lamure	(Spain) Mikel Artuch
Hand-pelota (pairs)	(Mexico) Díaz, Cabello	(France) Sarralde, Amulet	(Spain) Garatea, Luquin
Paleta goma (men's)	(Argentina) Alfredo Villegas, Inchausti	(France) Suzanne, Guillenteguy	(Mexico) Pacheco, García
Paleta goma (women's)	(France) Etchelecu, Chapelet	(Argentina) Stele, García	(Spain) Zamora, Arozena
Paleta cuero	(Argentina) Gastón Muñoz, Gabriel Villegas	(Uruguay) Pintos, Dufau	(Spain) Beunza, Ansó
Xare	(France) Laberdesque, Driolet	(Cuba) Castillo, Torres	(Argentina) Coluccio, Gramajo

Fronton (30 m), 4 events disputed

Event	Gold	Silver	Bronze
Paleta goma (men's)	(Mexico) Rodríguez	(Spain) Frías	(Argentina) Nicosia
Paleta goma (women's)	(Mexico) Castillo, Flores	(Spain) Micó, Mendizabal	(Argentina) Stele, Zair
Frontenis (men's)	(Mexico) Rodríguez, Rodríguez	(Spain) Frías, Peñate	(France) Azpeitia, Pucheux
Frontenis (women's)	(Mexico) Cepeda, Hernández	(Spain) Medina, Aranaz	(Cuba) Lima, Medina

Fronton (36 m), 4 events disputed

Event	Gold	Silver	Bronze
Hand-pelota (individual)	(Spain) Alberto Ongay	(Mexico) Fernando Medina	(France) Alain Migueltorena
Hand-pelota (pairs)	(Spain) Tabar, Yoldi	(Mexico) Alcántara, Alvarez	(France) Bernard, Erreca
Paleta cuero	(Spain) Arraya, Skufca	(France) Welmant, Fontano	(Mexico) Ledesma, Urrutia
Pala corta	(Cuba) Jardínez, Pérez	(France) Brefel, Iris	(Spain) Fernández de Laskoiti, Echavarren

Fronton (54 m), 1 event disputed

Event	Gold	Silver	Bronze
Jai alai	(Spain) Alberro, Inza	(France) Barandika, Lekerikabeaskoa	(Mexico) Inclán, Valdés

== Medal table ==
Rank	Nation	Gold	Silver	Bronze	Total
1	Mexico (host nation)	6	2	3	11
2	Spain	4	4	5	13
3	France	2	6	3	11
4	Argentina	2	1	3	6
5	Cuba	1	1	1	3
6	Uruguay	0	1	0	1
