= 2010 Basque Pelota World Championships =

World championships in Basque pelota

- Tournament poster

Tournament information
- Location: Pau, France
- Dates: 1–10 October
- Administrator: FIPV
- Teams: 19
- Website: www.pelota-2010.fr

Final positions
- Champions: Spain
- 1st runners-up: Mexico
- 2nd runners-up: France

The 2010 Basque Pelota World Championships were the 16th edition of the Basque Pelota World Championships organized by the FIPV.

== Participating nations ==
- Argentina
- Belgium
- Brazil
- Canada
- Chile
- Costa Rica
- Cuba
- Dominican Republic
- France
- Guatemala
- Italy
- Mexico
- Nicaragua
- Peru
- Philippines
- Spain
- United States
- Uruguay
- Venezuela

== Events ==
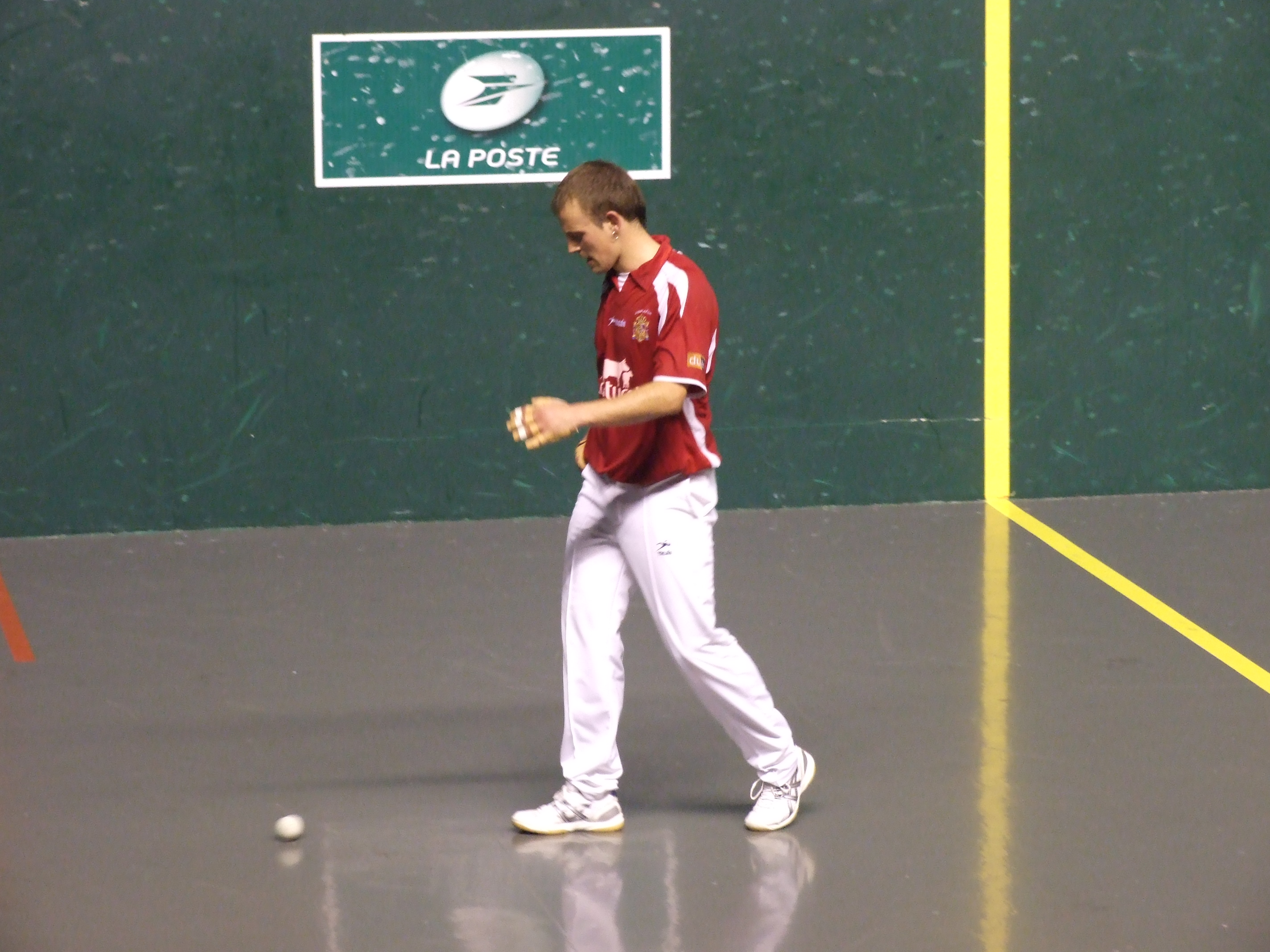
Onsalo during the hand-pelota individual (fronton) final.

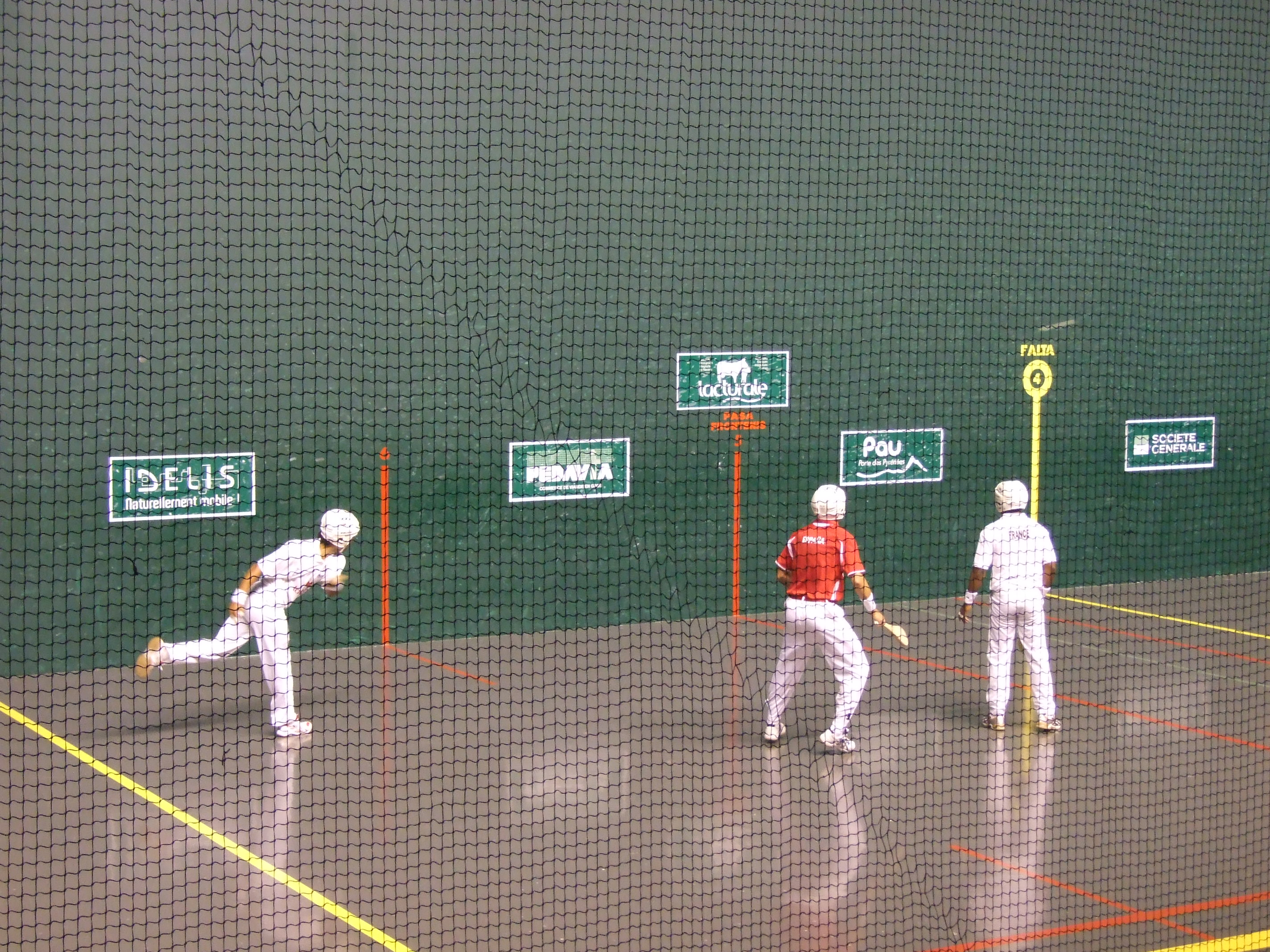
An exchange during the paleta cuero (fronton) final.

A total of 14 events were disputed, in 4 playing areas.

Trinquete, 6 events disputed

Event	Gold	Silver	Bronze
Hand-pelota (individual)	(Mexico) Cabello	(France) Jeannots	(Spain) Berrogui
Hand-pelota (pairs)	(Mexico) Serralde, Molotla	(France) Inchauspe, Lambert	(Spain) Monreal, Landa
Paleta goma (men's)	(Argentina) Torres, Villegas S.	(France) Suzanne, Guillenteguy	(Uruguay) Buzzo, Cazzola
Paleta goma (women's)	(Spain) Urkizu, Ruiz Larramendi	(France) Leiza, Elguezabal	(Argentina) Zair, García
Paleta cuero	(Argentina) Sergio Villegas, Gastón Muñoz	(Spain) Miguel Fernández Laskoiti, Xabier Menéndez	(France) Cazemayor, Bergerot
Xare	(France) Laberdesque, Algalarrondo	(Spain) Dufur, Larrea	(Cuba) Pérez, Castillo

Fronton (30 m), 3 events disputed

Event	Gold	Silver	Bronze
Paleta goma (men's)	(Argentina) Nicosia, Ergueta	(Spain) Frías, Alvarez	(Mexico) Homero Hurtado, Raymundo Tovar
Frontenis (men's)	(Mexico) Gasca, Alberto Rodríguez Faisal	(Spain) Martínez, Frías	(France) Azpeitia, Pucheux
Frontenis (women's)	(Mexico) Encarnación, Paulina Castillo	(Spain) Medina, Aranaz	(Cuba) Lima, Medina

Fronton (36 m), 4 events disputed

Event	Gold	Silver	Bronze
Hand-pelota (individual)	(Spain) Onsalo	(Mexico) Fernando Medina	(France) Alberdi
Hand-pelota (pairs)	(Spain) Irigoyen, Untoria	(Mexico) Fernando Medina, Jorge Alcántara	(France) Gogny, Arraztoa
Paleta cuero	(Spain) Caballero, Skufca	(France) Fontano, Welmant	(Argentina) Basualdo, Callarelli
Pala corta	(France) Iris, Brefel	(Spain) Zozaya, Velilla	(Cuba) Pérez, Fernández

Fronton (54 m), 1 event disputed

Event	Gold	Silver	Bronze
Jai alai	(France) Tambourindeguy, Etcheto	(Mexico) Juan Pablo Valdés, José Miguel Valdés	(Spain) Lekue, Padrosa

== Medal table ==
Rank	Nation	Gold	Silver	Bronze	Total
1	Spain	4	6	3	13
2	Mexico	4	3	1	8
3	France (host nation)	3	5	4	12
4	Argentina	3	0	2	5
5	Cuba	0	0	3	3
6	Uruguay	0	0	1	1
