= 1994 Basque Pelota World Championships =

World championships in Basque pelota

- Tournament poster

Tournament information
- Location: Saint-Jean-de-Luz, France
- Dates: September–
- Administrator: FIPV
- Teams: 10+

Final positions
- Champions: France
- 1st runners-up: Spain
- 2nd runners-up: Mexico

The 1994 Basque Pelota World Championships were the 12th edition of the Basque Pelota World Championships organized by the FIPV.

== Participating nations ==
- Argentina
- Belgium
- Chile
- Cuba
- France
- Mexico
- Spain
- United States
- Uruguay
- Venezuela
- Others

== Events ==
A total of 14 events were disputed, in 4 playing areas.

Trinquete, 6 events disputed

Event	Gold	Silver	Bronze
Hand-pelota (individual)	(France) Etcheto	(Mexico) Zea "Bionico"	(Spain) Larrañaga
Hand-pelota (pairs)	(France) Dermit, Andre	(Mexico) Saldaña, Santamaria	(Spain) Gorria, Txoperena
Paleta goma (men's)	(Argentina) Ross, Romano	(France) Lissard, Lasalle	(Chile) Sáez, Córdoba
Paleta goma (women's)	(France) Haran, Seilhan	(Argentina) Cimadamore, Scheltino	(Spain) Mendizabal, Ruiz
Paleta cuero	(Argentina) Elortondo, Abadia	(France) Arena, Bergerot	(Spain) Mendiluce, Aldadill
Xare	(France) Ameztoy, Olasagazti	(Spain) Iturbe, Molina	(Uruguay) Rabellino, Beltrane

Fronton (30 m), 3 events disputed

Event	Gold	Silver	Bronze
Paleta goma (men's)	(Mexico) Hurtado, E. Salazar	(Argentina) Ross, Supon	(Chile) Sáez, Córdoba
Frontenis (men's)	(Mexico) J. Salazar, E. Salazar	(Argentina) Cimadamore, Garda	(Spain) Velasco, Cogollo
Frontenis (women's)	(Mexico) Muñoz, Flores	(France) Claverie, Rollet	(Spain) Navarrete, Palacio

Fronton (36 m), 4 events disputed

Event	Gold	Silver	Bronze
Hand-pelota (individual)	(Spain) Aguirre	(Mexico) Marin	(France) Alfaro
Hand-pelota (pairs)	(Spain) Artola, Imaz	(Mexico) Hiriart, Mutuberria	(France) Vera, Olivos
Paleta cuero	(France) Arrosagarai, Latxage	(Spain) Tejada, Oroz	(Mexico) Mercadillo, Musi
Pala corta	(Spain) Zeberio, Recalde	(France) Bourda, Carral	(Cuba) Gonzalez, Lujan

Fronton (54 m), 1 event disputed

Event	Gold	Silver	Bronze
Jai alai	(Spain) Lander, Osa	(Mexico) Valdes, Valdes	(France) Garcia, Camy

== Medal table ==
Rank	Nation	Gold	Silver	Bronze	Total
1	France (host nation)	5	4	3	12
2	Spain	4	2	6	12
3	Mexico	3	5	1	9
4	Argentina	2	3	0	5
5	Chile	0	0	2	2
6	Cuba	0	0	1	1
6	Uruguay	0	0	1	1
