= 2006 Basque Pelota World Championships =

World championships in Basque pelota

- Tournament logo

Tournament information
- Location: Mexico City, Mexico
- Dates: 22 September–1 October
- Administrator: FIPV
- Teams: 18
- Website: www.xvcampeonatomundial.com

Final positions
- Champions: Mexico
- 1st runners-up: Spain
- 2nd runners-up: France

The 2006 Basque Pelota World Championships were the 15th edition of the Basque Pelota World Championships organized by the FIPV.

== Participating nations ==
- Argentina
- Belgium
- Brazil
- Chile
- Costa Rica
- Cuba
- Dominican Republic
- Ecuador
- France
- Guatemala
- Italy
- Mexico
- Peru
- Philippines
- Spain
- United States
- Uruguay
- Venezuela

== Events ==
A total of 14 events were disputed, in 4 playing areas.

Trinquete, 6 events disputed

Event	Gold	Silver	Bronze
Hand-pelota (individual)	(Mexico) Heriberto López	(Spain) Alvárez	(France) Benesse
Hand-pelota (pairs)	(Mexico) Santamaría, Serralde	(France) Belascain, Harocarene	(Cuba) Izquierdo, Quesada
Paleta goma (men's)	(Argentina) Dick, Cimadamore	(Uruguay) Buzzo, Cazzola	(France) Suzanne, Lissar
Paleta goma (women's)	(France) Leiza, Housset	(Spain) Mendizabal, Ruiz Larramendi	(Mexico) Flores, Cepeda
Paleta cuero	(Argentina) Villegas, Villegas	(France) Bergerot, Casemayor	(Spain) Araujo, Menéndez
Xare	(France) Laberdesque, Sanglar	(Spain) Lopetegui, Vinuesa	(Argentina) Coluccio, Gramajo

Fronton (30 m), 3 events disputed

Event	Gold	Silver	Bronze
Paleta goma (men's)	(Mexico) Hurtado, Rodríguez	(Spain) Frias, Boils	(Argentina) Nicosia, Ergueta
Frontenis (men's)	(Mexico) Rodríguez, Miramontes	(Spain) J. Frías, S. Hawach	(France) Bordenave, Laberdesque
Frontenis (women's)	(Mexico) Hernández, Castillo	(Spain) Frías, Martínez	(France) Dothen, Rolet

Fronton (36 m), 4 events disputed

Event	Gold	Silver	Bronze
Hand-pelota (individual)	(Spain) Irigoyen	(France) Lambert	(United States) Huarte
Hand-pelota (pairs)	(Spain) Abad, Navarro	(Mexico) Landa, Olivos	(France) Etcheto, Bessonart
Paleta cuero	(Mexico) Ledesma, Mendiburu	(Spain) González, Caballero	(France) De Elizondo, Welmant
Pala corta	(Spain) Urriza, Velilla	(France) Iris, Latxague	(Mexico) Mendiburu, Aguirre

Fronton (54 m), 1 event disputed

Event	Gold	Silver	Bronze
Jai alai	(France) García, Inza	(Spain) Beaskoetxea, Ros	(Mexico) J. P. Valdes, F. Valdes

== Medal table ==
Rank	Nation	Gold	Silver	Bronze	Total
1	Mexico (host nation)	6	1	3	10
2	Spain	3	8	1	12
3	France	3	4	6	13
4	Argentina	2	0	2	4
5	Uruguay	0	1	0	1
6	Cuba	0	0	1	1
7	United States	0	0	1	1
