= 1982 Basque Pelota World Championships =

World championships in Basque pelota

- Tournament poster

Tournament information
- Location: Mexico City, Mexico
- Dates: 15–24 October
- Administrator: FIPV
- Teams: 9+

Final positions
- Champions: France
- 1st runners-up: Argentina
- 2nd runners-up: Spain

The 1982 Basque Pelota World Championships were the 9th edition of the Basque Pelota World Championships organized by the FIPV.

== Participating nations ==
- Argentina
- Chile
- France
- Italy
- Mexico
- Spain
- United States
- Uruguay
- Venezuela
- Others

== Events ==
A total of 12 events were disputed, in 4 playing areas.

Trinquete, 5 events disputed

Event	Gold	Silver	Bronze
Hand-pelota (individual)	(France) Inchauspe	(Uruguay) Iraizoz	(Spain) Alzaga
Hand-pelota (pairs)	(France) Garat, Carricart	(Spain) Marañon, Angulo	(Uruguay) Manera, Dalloglio
Paleta goma (men's)	(Argentina) Ross, Ross	(Uruguay) Arcauz, Armegias	(Spain) Irizar, Pagoaga
Paleta cuero	(Argentina) Miro, R. Bizzozero	(Spain) Amestoy, Arbeloa	(France) Gallardon, Sallaberry
Xare	(France) Lasarte, Garbizu	(Argentina) Friggerio, R. Elias	(Spain) Uzcudun, Olano

Fronton (30 m), 2 events disputed

Event	Gold	Silver	Bronze
Paleta goma (men's)	(Argentina) Armas, Fiale	(Mexico) Flores, Flores	(Uruguay) Manosbide, Bell
Frontenis (men's)	(Mexico) Chavez, Suarez	(Argentina) Armas, Elortondo	(France) Bonnet, Lartigue

Fronton (36 m), 4 events disputed

Event	Gold	Silver	Bronze
Hand-pelota (individual)	(France) M. Etchegoin	(Spain) Eguino	(Mexico) Nuñez
Hand-pelota (pairs)	(France) Diribarne, Mutuberrua	(Spain) Artega, Errandonea	(Mexico) Lopez, Saldaña
Paleta cuero	(Argentina) A. Ramirez, R. Bizzozero	(Mexico) Garritz, J. Musi	(France) J. Milhet, M. Bonnet
Pala corta	(Spain) P. Hernandez, R. Garrido	(Mexico) Mendiburu, J. Musi	(Argentina) A. Ramirez, Romano

Fronton (54 m), 1 event disputed

Event	Gold	Silver	Bronze
Jai alai	(France) D. Michelena, J. Inchauspe	(United States) Schofill, Boornazien	(Spain) Alberdi, Vivanco

== Medal table ==
Rank	Nation	Gold	Silver	Bronze	Total
1	France	6	0	3	9
2	Argentina	4	2	1	7
3	Spain	1	4	4	9
4	Mexico (host nation)	1	3	2	6
5	Uruguay	0	2	2	4
6	United States	0	1	0	1
