= 1962 Basque Pelota World Championships =

Tournament organized by the FIPV

- Tournament poster

Tournament information
- Location: Pamplona, Spain
- Dates: 20–30 September
- Administrator: FIPV
- Teams: 7

Final positions
- Champions: Argentina
- 1st runners-up: Spain
- 2nd runners-up: France

The 1962 Basque Pelota World Championships were the 4th edition of the Basque Pelota World Championships organized by the FIPV.

== Participating nations ==
- Argentina
- France
- Mexico
- Morocco
- Philippines
- Spain
- Uruguay

== Events ==
A total of 12 events were disputed, in 4 playing areas.

Trinquete, 5 events disputed

Event	Gold	Silver	Bronze
Hand-pelota (individual)	(France) J. B. Garat	(Spain) Balda	-
Hand-pelota (pairs)	(France) Hidope, Espel	(Spain) Tranche, Echeveste	-
Paleta goma (men's)	(Argentina) A.sether, R.ibarra	(Uruguay) González, Bell	-
Paleta cuero	(Argentina) A. Sether, J. Labat	(France) P. Bareits, B. Clairacq	-
Xare	(Argentina) R. Elias, J. Labat	(Uruguay) Pereira, Borghetti	-

Fronton (30 m), 1 event disputed

Event	Gold	Silver	Bronze
Paleta goma (men's)	(Argentina) A. Sether, R. Ibarra	(Mexico) Becerril, M. Beltran	-

Fronton (36 m), 5 events disputed

Event	Gold	Silver	Bronze
Hand-pelota (individual)	(Spain) Arriola IV	(France) Mugica	-
Hand-pelota (pairs)	(Spain) M. Vergara, Alegria	(France) Etcheto, Mugica	-
Paleta cuero	(France) P. Bareits, B. Clairacq	(Spain) Gurruchaga, Unanue	-
Pala corta	(Spain) D. Llorca, Garralda	(France) P.bareits, B. Claircq	-
Frontenis (men's)	(Mexico) Salazar, Sanchez	(Spain) Castro, Vidal	-

Fronton (54 m), 1 event disputed

Event	Gold	Silver	Bronze
Jai alai	(Mexico) A. Zubikarai, J. Hamui	(Spain) E. Mirapeix, J. M. Mirapeix	-

== Medal table ==
Rank	Nation	Gold	Silver	Bronze	Total
1	Argentina	4	0	-	4
2	Spain (host nation)	3	5	-	8
3	France	3	4	-	7
4	Mexico	2	1	-	3
5	Uruguay	0	2	-	2
