= 1990 Basque Pelota World Championships =

World championships in Basque pelota

- Tournament poster

Tournament information
- Location: Havana, Cuba
- Dates: 14–23 November
- Administrator: FIPV
- Teams: 10+

Final positions
- Champions: Spain
- 1st runners-up: Mexico
- 2nd runners-up: France

The 1990 Basque Pelota World Championships were the 11th edition of the Basque Pelota World Championships organized by the FIPV.

== Participating nations ==
- Argentina
- Belgium
- Chile
- Cuba
- France
- Mexico
- Spain
- United States
- Uruguay
- Venezuela
- Others

== Events ==
A total of 14 events were disputed, in 4 playing areas.

Trinquete, 6 events disputed

Event	Gold	Silver	Bronze
Hand-pelota (individual)	(Mexico) A. Zea	(France) A. Aguerre	(Spain) J. Zufiaurre
Hand-pelota (pairs)	(France) P. Dermit, F. Aramburu	(Mexico) H. Saldaña, P. Santamaria	(Spain) M. Choperena, C. Choperena
Paleta goma (men's)	(Argentina) R. Ross, E. Ross	(Spain) M. Irizar, J. Pagoaga	(France) M. Lasalle, P. Lissard
Paleta goma (women's)	(France) Haran, Seilan	(Argentina) S. Cimadamore, Schettino	(Uruguay)
Paleta cuero	(Argentina) F. Elortuondo, F. Abadia	(Spain) L. Altadill, J. Ubanell	(France) E. Arenas, A. Bergerot
Xare	(France) P. Lasarte, F. Olasagasti	(Spain) I. Iturbe, J. L. Larrea	(Argentina) R. Bizzorero, E. Fricerio

Fronton (30 m), 3 events disputed

Event	Gold	Silver	Bronze
Paleta goma (men's)	(Mexico) R. Flores, J. Flores	(Argentina) H. Fale, S. Supan	(Chile) J. P. Sáez, J. A. Córdoba
Frontenis (men's)	(Spain) Velasco, Fite	(Cuba) Anduiza, Perez	(Mexico) J. Salazar, E. Salazar
Frontenis (women's)	(Mexico) Muñoz, Flores	(France) Rolet, Sabalza	(Spain) Martinez, Ortiz

Fronton (36 m), 4 events disputed

Event	Gold	Silver	Bronze
Hand-pelota (individual)	(Spain) F. Lasa	(France) B. Muguida	(Mexico) C. Nuñez
Hand-pelota (pairs)	(Spain) F. Eugui, F. Azcarate	(France) J. Hirigoyen, D. Mutuberria	(Mexico) F. Vera, L. Izquierdo
Paleta cuero	(Spain) O. Insausti, J. P. Garcia	(Mexico) J. Musi, F. Iniestra	(France) I. Arrosagaray, J. Bonnet
Pala corta	(Spain) D. Garcia, R. Garrido	(France) F. Prat, O. Galanena	(Cuba) I. Gonzalez, R. Gonzalez

Fronton (54 m), 1 event disputed

Event	Gold	Silver	Bronze
Jai alai	(Spain) A. Compañón, Mugartegui	(France) P. Etchalus, J. P. Inchauspe	(Mexico) A. Lopez, F. Valdes

== Medal table ==
Only the 12 men’s events were included in the final medal tally. The two women’s disciplines (paleta goma and frontenis) were not counted.

Rank	Nation	Gold	Silver	Bronze	Total
1	Spain	6	3	2	11
2	France	2	5	3	10
3	Mexico	2	2	4	8
4	Argentina	2	1	1	4
5	Cuba (host nation)	0	1	1	2
6	Chile	0	0	1	1
