= 2002 Basque Pelota World Championships =

World championships in Basque pelota

- Tournament poster

Tournament information
- Location: Pamplona, Spain
- Dates: 21–31 August
- Administrator: FIPV
- Teams: 14
- Website: www.mundialnavarra2002.com

Final positions
- Champions: Spain
- 1st runners-up: France
- 2nd runners-up: Mexico

The 2002 Basque Pelota World Championships were the 14th edition of the Basque Pelota World Championships organized by the FIPV.

== Participating nations ==
- Argentina
- Belgium
- Brazil
- Canada
- Chile
- Cuba
- France
- Mexico
- Peru
- Philippines
- Spain
- United States
- Uruguay
- Venezuela

== Events ==
A total of 14 events were disputed, in 4 playing areas.

Trinquete, 6 events disputed

Event	Gold	Silver	Bronze
Hand-pelota (individual)	(Cuba) Agusti	(Mexico) Heriberto Lopez	(France) Kurutcharry
Hand-pelota (pairs)	(Mexico) Beltran, Santamaria	(Cuba) Agusti, Quesada	(France) Sorhuet, Berasategui
Paleta goma (men's)	(Argentina) Miro, Cimadamore	(Uruguay) L. Barreiro, G. Hernandez	(France) Suzanne, Hernandorena
Paleta goma (women's)	(France) Leiza, Housset	(Spain) Susana, Mendizabal	(Argentina) Stelle, Schettino
Paleta cuero	(France) Cazemayor, Bergerot	(Spain) Eslava II, F. Rodriguez	(Argentina) Fusto, Abadia
Xare	(France) Celan, Sanglar	(Spain) Lopetegui, Larrarte	(Cuba) Molina, Y. Toledano

Fronton (30 m), 3 events disputed

Event	Gold	Silver	Bronze
Paleta goma (men's)	(Argentina) Nicosia, Franco	(Mexico) Hurtado, Salazar	(Spain) Martinez, Boils
Frontenis (men's)	(Mexico) A. M. Rodriguez, G. Miramontes	(Spain) Ramires, Frias	(Cuba) Fernandez, Alvarez
Frontenis (women's)	(Mexico) Gonzales, Guadalupe	(Spain) Mico, Hernando	(France) Claverie, Bordagaray

Fronton (36 m), 4 events disputed

Event	Gold	Silver	Bronze
Hand-pelota (individual)	(Spain) Bengoetxea	(Mexico) J. Marin	(France) Elissalde
Hand-pelota (pairs)	(Spain) Larraya, Navarro	(France) Berra, Harismendy	(Mexico) Francisco, Olivos
Paleta cuero	(Spain) Larrea, Oroz	(France) Nasciet, Latxague	(Argentina) Fusto, Abadia
Pala corta	(Spain) Gaubeca, Erburu	(France) Laffitte, Dupruilh	(Mexico) Mendiburu, Ledesma

Fronton (54 m), 1 event disputed

Event	Gold	Silver	Bronze
Jai alai	(France) García, Iturria	(Spain) Foronda, Lopez	(Mexico) Sierra, F. Valdes

== Medal table ==
Rank	Nation	Gold	Silver	Bronze	Total
1	Spain (host nation)	4	6	1	11
2	France	4	3	5	12
3	Mexico	3	3	3	9
4	Argentina	2	0	3	5
5	Cuba	1	1	2	4
6	Uruguay	0	1	0	1
