= 1986 Basque Pelota World Championships =

World championships in Basque pelota

- Tournament poster

Tournament information
- Location: Vitoria, Spain
- Dates: 13–21 September
- Administrator: FIPV
- Teams: 11

Final positions
- Champions: France
- 1st runners-up: Spain
- 2nd runners-up: Mexico

The 1986 Basque Pelota World Championships were the 10th edition of the Basque Pelota World Championships organized by the FIPV.

== Participating nations ==
- Argentina
- Chile
- Cuba
- France
- Italy
- Mexico
- Philippines
- Spain
- United States
- Uruguay
- Venezuela

== Events ==
A total of 12 events were disputed, in 4 playing areas.

Trinquete, 5 events disputed

Event	Gold	Silver	Bronze
Hand-pelota (individual)	(France) M. Martiarena	(Mexico) A. Zea	(Spain) J. M. Presa
Hand-pelota (pairs)	(France) P. Larronde, X. Saint	(Spain) I. Azpiroz, Angulo	(Mexico) P. Santamaria, R. Saldaña
Paleta goma (men's)	(Argentina) J. Miro, S. Supam	(France) F. Dibarrat, J. M. Aguirre	(Uruguay) G. Arcaus, E. Liguera
Paleta cuero	(Argentina) F. Elortuondo, Irigoitia	(Uruguay) C. Bernal, N. Iroldi	(Spain) J. M. Igartua, J. Arbeloa
Xare	(France) P. Lasarte, M. Garbizu	(Argentina) E. Frigerio, R. Bizzorero	(Spain) J. L. Baztarrica, M. Uzcundun

Fronton (30 m), 2 events disputed

Event	Gold	Silver	Bronze
Paleta goma (men's)	(Mexico) J. Salazar, E. Salazar	(Argentina) M. Giri, A. Armas	(Chile) J. P. Sáez, J. A. Córdoba
Frontenis (men's)	(Mexico) J. Marron, J. Becerra	(Spain) F. J. Sellares, P. Fite	(Cuba) J. Perez, A. Dominguez

Fronton (36 m), 4 events disputed

Event	Gold	Silver	Bronze
Hand-pelota (individual)	(Spain) L. Iribarren	(France) M. Berra	(Mexico) A. Izquierdo
Hand-pelota (pairs)	(France) A. Jaurena, D. Mutuberria	(Spain) M. J. Arcelus, F. Satrústegui	(Mexico) F. Medina, A. Izquierdo
Paleta cuero	(Spain) O. Insausti, J. P. Garcia	(France) F. Prat, J. M. Bonnet	(Argentina) C. Beltramone, A. Ramirez
Pala corta	(Spain) D. Garcia, R. Garrido	(Mexico) F. Iniestra, J. Musi	(France) J. Aguerre, C. Galanena

Fronton (54 m), 1 event disputed

Event	Gold	Silver	Bronze
Jai alai	(France) Etxeverria, Inchauspe	(Spain) A. Alberdi, F. Fernandez	(United States) A. Albrycht, G. Scott

== Medal table ==
Rank	Nation	Gold	Silver	Bronze	Total
1	France	5	3	1	9
2	Spain (host nation)	3	4	3	10
3	Mexico	2	2	3	7
4	Argentina	2	2	1	5
5	Uruguay	0	1	1	2
6	Cuba	0	0	1	1
7	United States	0	0	1	1
8	Chile	0	0	1	1
