= 1955 Basque Pelota World Championships =

- Tournament poster

Tournament information
- Location: Montevideo, Uruguay
- Dates: December–
- Administrator: FIPV
- Teams: 7

Final positions
- Champions: Spain
- 1st runners-up: Argentina
- 2nd runners-up: Mexico

The 1955 Basque Pelota World Championships were the 2nd edition of the Basque Pelota World Championships, organized by the FIPV.

== Participating nations ==
- Argentina
- Chile
- Cuba
- France
- Mexico
- Spain
- Uruguay

== Events ==
A total of 12 events were disputed, in 4 playing areas.

Trinquete, 4 events disputed

Event	Gold	Silver	Bronze
Hand-pelota (individual)	(Uruguay) A. Iraizos	(France) M. Etchemendy	-
Hand-pelota (pairs)	(France) M. Etchemendy, M. Vigneau	(Spain) F. Bengoechea, J. Unanue	-
Paleta goma (men's)	(Argentina) R. Novoa, Dellecassagrande	(Uruguay) G. Pereira, A. Pardo	-
Paleta cuero	(Argentina) J. Labat, W. Arrinda	(France) E. Arce, J. Clairacq	-

Fronton (30 m), 2 events disputed

Event	Gold	Silver	Bronze
Paleta goma (men's)	(Argentina) J. Labat, W. Arrinda	(Mexico) J. Becerril, J. Beltran	-
Frontenis (men's)	(Mexico) J. Becerril, J. Garibay	(Argentina) J. Berdinas, A. Carocella	-

Fronton (36 m), 4 events disputed

Event	Gold	Silver	Bronze
Hand-pelota (individual)	(Spain) M. Moreno "Del Val"	(France) P. Laxague	-
Hand-pelota (pairs)	(Spain) J. Ezcurra, F. Echave	(France) M. Etchemendy, D. Olhasso	-
Paleta cuero	(Spain) V. Sola, S. Aristi	(France) E. Arte, J. Clairacq	-
Pala corta	(Spain) J. C.Artola, S. Aristi	(Mexico) F. Pardo, J. Ramos	-

Fronton (54 m), 2 events disputed

Event	Gold	Silver	Bronze
Jai alai	(Mexico) R. Montes, A. Lopez	(Spain) J. Hernandez, A. de la Rosa	-
Pala larga	(Spain) V. Sola, F. Huarte	(Mexico) F. Pardo, J. Ramos	-

== Medal table ==
Rank	Nation	Gold	Silver	Bronze	Total
1	Spain	5	2	-	7
2	Argentina	3	1	-	4
3	Mexico	2	3	-	5
4	France	1	5	-	6
5	Uruguay (host nation)	1	1	-	2
