= 1998 Basque Pelota World Championships =

World championships in Basque pelota

Tournament information
- Location: Mexico City, Mexico
- Dates: 15–25 October
- Administrator: FIPV
- Teams: 10+

Final positions
- Champions: Spain
- 1st runners-up: Mexico
- 2nd runners-up: Argentina

The 1998 Basque Pelota World Championships were the 13th edition of the Basque Pelota World Championships organized by the FIPV.

== Participating nations ==
- Argentina
- Belgium
- Chile
- Cuba
- France
- Mexico
- Spain
- United States
- Uruguay
- Venezuela
- Others

== Events ==
A total of 14 events were disputed, in 4 playing areas.

Trinquete, 6 events disputed

Event	Gold	Silver	Bronze
Hand-pelota (individual)	(France) P. Ocafrain	(Mexico) R. Saldaña	(Spain) M. Bringas
Hand-pelota (pairs)	(Mexico) S. Beltran, P. Santamaria	(France) O. Larrechea, S. Mayte	(Spain) J. Ruiz, A. Sanz
Paleta goma (men's)	(Argentina) J. Miro, W. Pirera	(Uruguay) L. Barreiro, G. Hernandez	(Chile) J. Saez, J. Cabello
Paleta goma (women's)	(Spain) M. Mendizabal, M. Ruiz	(France) S. Leiza, N. Seilhan	(Argentina) S. Cimadamore, Schettino
Paleta cuero	(Argentina) C. Algarbe, D. Rolletini	(France) C. Arenas, A. Bergerot	(Uruguay) S. Coitiño, E. Cazzola
Xare	(Spain) J. Lopetegui, J. Larrarte	(France) F. Olazagasti, M. Funosas	(Argentina) Occhione, Coluccio

Fronton (30 m), 3 events disputed

Event	Gold	Silver	Bronze
Paleta goma (men's)	(Argentina) G. Muñoz, M. Franco	(Mexico) E. Salazar, H. Hurtado	(Cuba) J. Fernandez, J. Perez
Frontenis (men's)	(Mexico) E. Salazar, J. Salazar	(Spain) J. Frias, S. Hawach	(Cuba) P. Rojas, J. Tang
Frontenis (women's)	(Mexico) M. Muñoz, R. Flores	(Argentina) M. Ciccareli, E. Iglesias	(France) C. Rolet, A. Etchelecou

Fronton (36 m), 4 events disputed

Event	Gold	Silver	Bronze
Hand-pelota (individual)	(Spain) J. Apezetxea	(France) S. Gonzales	(Cuba) A. Quesada
Hand-pelota (pairs)	(Spain) I. Muruamendiaraiz, P. Ruiz	(Cuba) N. Montalvo, A. Bruzain	(France) M. Berra, B. Muguida
Paleta cuero	(Spain) F. Casado, R. Oroz	(Cuba) R. Gonzalez, V. Lujan	(France) I. Arrossagaray, J. M. Bonnet
Pala corta	(Cuba) R. Gonzalez, V. Lujan	(Spain) T. Zabalza, J. Erburu	(France) T. Nasciet, C. Latxague

Fronton (54 m), 1 event disputed

Event	Gold	Silver	Bronze
Jai alai	(France) L. Garcia, E. Irastorza	(Mexico) J. P. Valdes, F. Valdes	(Spain) M. Plaza, A. Mancisidor

== Medal table ==
Rank	Nation	Gold	Silver	Bronze	Total
1	Spain	5	2	3	10
2	Mexico (host nation)	3	3	0	6
3	Argentina	3	1	2	6
4	France	2	5	4	11
5	Cuba	1	2	3	6
6	Uruguay	0	1	1	2
7	Chile	0	0	1	1
