= Basque Pelota World Championships =

Amateur Basque pelota tournament series

Tournament information
- Sport: Basque pelota
- Established: 1952
- Number of tournaments: 20
- Administrator: FIPV

Current champion
- Spain (9th title)

The Basque Pelota World Championships is a quadrennial tournament first organized in 1952 by the International Federation of Basque Pelota. The modern championships crown the best amateur players in fifteen different playing categories.

== History ==
The first edition of the tournament was organized in 1952 and until 1958 was played every three years. The tournament has occurred every four years since then. No third place titles were awarded during the first five editions of the tournament. Additionally, the number of disciplines disputed at each tournament has varied depending on the edition and has even included disciplines played on the Plaza Libre in 1952 and 1958. Until the edition of 1990, no women's categories were disputed in the championships. A single women's discipline was added in 1990 (Paleta goma – Trinquete), then another one in 1994 (Frontenis), and finally a third one in 2014 (Paleta goma – Fronton 30 m), bringing the total number of disputed categories to fifteen. Starting in 1995, the FIPV has also organized a Basque Pelota World Cup on each of the four categories of Basque pelota (Trinquete, Fronton 30m, Fronton 36m, Fronton 54m) which are also played quadrennially.

=== Modern events ===
Trinquete, 6 events:

Hand-pelota (individual)
Hand-pelota (pairs)
Paleta goma (men's)
Paleta goma (women's)
Paleta cuero
Xare

Fronton (30 m), 4 events:

Paleta goma (men's)
Paleta goma (women's)
Frontenis (men's)
Frontenis (women's)

Fronton (36 m), 4 events:

Hand-pelota (individual)
Hand-pelota (pairs)
Paleta cuero
Pala corta

Fronton (54 m), 1 event:

Jai alai

== Editions ==
Year	Host city and country	Best performing nations			Number of participating nations
Year	Host city and country	1st place, gold medalist(s)	2nd place, silver medalist(s)	3rd place, bronze medalist(s)	Number of participating nations
1952	San Sebastián, Spain	France	Spain	Argentina	8
1955	Montevideo, Uruguay	Spain	Argentina	Mexico	7
1958	Biarritz, France	France	Spain	Argentina	9
1962	Pamplona, Spain	Argentina	Spain	France	7
1966	Montevideo, Uruguay	France	Mexico	Spain	8
1970	San Sebastián, Spain	Spain	France	Argentina	7
1974	Montevideo, Uruguay	Argentina	France	Spain	8
1978	Biarritz, France	Spain	Argentina	France	9
1982	Mexico City, Mexico	France	Argentina	Spain	10
1986	Vitoria, Spain	France	Spain	Mexico	11
1990	Havana, Cuba	Spain	France	Mexico	14
1994	Saint-Jean-de-Luz, France	France	Spain	Mexico	17
1998	Mexico City, Mexico	Spain	Mexico	Argentina	10+
2002	Pamplona, Spain	Spain	France	Mexico	14
2006	Mexico City, Mexico	Mexico	Spain	France	18
2010	Pau, France	Spain	Mexico	France	19
2014	Zinacantepec, Mexico	Mexico	Spain	France	18
2018	Barcelona, Spain	France	Spain	Mexico	14
2022	Biarritz, France	Spain	France	Mexico	35
2026	Buenos Aires, Argentina	Spain	Argentina	Euskadi	15

=== Nations finishing in top three ===
Nation	First place	Second place	Third place	Total
Spain	9	8	3	20
France	7	5	5	17
Mexico	2	3	7	12
Argentina	2	4	4	10
Euskadi	0	0	1	1

== Medals (1952–2022) ==
Rank	Nation	Gold	Silver	Bronze	Total
1	Spain	85	93	41	219
2	France	75	71	60	206
3	Mexico	56	43	43	142
4	Argentina	53	28	22	103
5	Uruguay	4	29	16	49
6	Euskadi	4	7	1	12
7	Cuba	3	5	17	25
8	United States	0	3	5	8
9	Philippines	0	1	0	1
10	Chile	0	0	6	6
Totals (10 entries)		280	280	211	771

(Note: This table includes all modalities, including those being played in Plaza Libre in 1952 and 1958.) (Note: No bronze medals were disputed from 1952 to 1966.)

== List of hosts ==
List of hosts by number of championships hosted.

Times hosted	Host	Year(s)
6	Spain	1952, 1962, 1970, 1986, 2002, 2018
5	France	1958, 1978, 1994, 2010, 2022
4	Mexico	1982, 1998, 2006, 2014
3	Uruguay	1955, 1966, 1974
1	Cuba	1990
1	Argentina	2026

== See also ==
- Basque Pelota World Cup
