= 2026 Basque Pelota World Championships =

World championship

Tournament information
- Location: Buenos Aires, Argentina; Colonia de Sacramento, Uruguay
- Dates: 15–24 October
- Administrator: International Federation of Basque Pelota (FIPV)
- Teams: 15
- Website: https://mundialbsas2026.com.ar/

The 2026 Basque Pelota World Championships were the 20th edition of the championships, orginzed by the International Federation of Basque Pelota (FIPV). The competition took place in Buenos Aires, Argentina, being the first time the championships are held in said country.

== Background ==
In 2024, the Argentine city of San Luis was announced as the host city for the championships; however, it subsequently renounced its hosting status. The following year, it was announced that Venado Tuerto, a city located in the province of Santa Fe, Argentina, would be the new host. The city had also previously hosted the U-23 World Basque Pelota Championship in September 2025. Due to financial issues and the inability to construct a new sports complex for the event, the competition was ultimately moved to Buenos Aires.

The events were contested at three different venues across Buenos Aires: Centro Nacional de Alto Rendimiento Deportivo (CeNARD), Club Ciudad de Buenos Aires, and Club Banco Provincia. Additionally, Colonia de Sacramento in Uruguay served as the location for the Jai alai events.

For the first time in the history of the championships, the Spanish autonomous community of Euskadi was allowed to participate independently, separate from the Spanish delegation. It went on to achieve four gold medals, finishing third in the medals table.

== Participating nations ==
- Argentina
- Brazil
- Chile
- Costa Rica
- Cuba
- Euskadi
- France
- Mexico
- Paraguay
- Peru
- Portugal
- Spain
- United States
- Uruguay
- Venezuela

== Events ==
=== Trinquete ===
Event	Gold	Silver	Bronze
Men's trinquete singles	Battitta Ducassaou; France	Luis Sánchez; Spain	Mexico
Men's trinquete doubles	Iker Espinal; Luis Sánchez; Spain	Peio Larralde; Andoni Iphar; France	Mexico
Men's paleta cuero	Federico Andreasen; Alfredo Villegas; Argentina	Miguel Fernández; Iñigo Ansó; Spain	Uruguay
Men's paleta goma	Argentina	France	Mexico
Women's paleta goma	Argentina	Spain	France
Men's xare	Joxi Lopetegi; Sebastián Moncada; Spain	Bruno Driolet; Andoni Castera; France	Alan Correa; Iñaki Gil; Argentina

=== Fronton (30 meters) ===
Event	Gold	Silver	Bronze
Men's paleta goma singles	Federico Fernández; Argentina	Gustavo Vidal; Spain	Mexico
Women's paleta goma singles	Maider Ardanaz; Spain	Nagore Martín; Euskadi	Dulce Figueroa; Mexico
Men's paleta goma doubles	Isaac Pérez; Jorge Olivera; Mexico	Víctor Molina; Gustavo Vidal; Spain	United States
Women's paleta goma doubles	Guadalupe Hernández; Ximena Placito; Mexico	Elena Agulló; Lidia Simón; Spain	Cuba

=== Fronton (36 meters) ===
Event	Gold	Silver	Bronze
Men's hand-pelota singles	Spain	Gaizka Carregal; Euskadi	Mexico
Men's hand-pelota doubles	Beñat Azketa; Oier Elorz; Euskadi	Oian Canabal; Unax Apeztegia; Spain	Mexico
Men's paleta cuero	Argentina	Spain	France
Men's pala corta	Carlos Baeza; Javier Insausti; Emiliano Skufca; Spain	Esteban Gaubeka; Imanol Ibáñez; Jagoba Madariaga; Iker Gordon; Euskadi	France
Men's cesta punta	Aritz Erkiaga; Ortzi Aldazabal; Euskadi	Jean Olharan; France	Rubén Bailo; Spain
Women's cesta punta	Erika Mugartegi; Spain	Helena Barrenetxea; Maialen Aldazabal; Euskadi	Oihana Sorozabal; France

=== Fronton (54 meters) ===
Event	Gold	Silver	Bronze
Men's jai alai	Xabier Barandika; Unai Lekerikabeaskoa; Eñaut Urreisti; Ion Ibarluzea; Euskadi	Johan Sorozabal; Gorka Sorozabal; United States	France
Women's jai alai	Erika Mugartegi; Arai Lejardi; Spain	Maite Ortiz de Mendibil; Maia Goikoetxea; Elaia Gogenola; Eneritz Lizardi; Euskadi	France

=== Frontball ===
Event	Gold	Silver	Bronze
Men's frontball	Abraham Moctezuma; Mexico	Mikel Aurrekoetxea; Euskadi	Santiago Yániz; Spain
Women's frontball	Paola Reyes; Mexico	Laia Salsamendi; Goiuri Zabaleta; Spain	Miren Larrarte; Olatz Arrizabalaga; Euskadi

=== Para-pelota ===
Event	Gold	Silver	Bronze
Trinquete	Edorta de Anta; Germán Luis Elkoro; Beñat Lizaso; Sergio Rodriguez; Euskadi	Dorian Navarro; Maxime Cabanne; France	Aldo Serra; Guillermo Poggio; Andoni Irazusta; Franco Herrera; Argentina
Fronton	Dorian Navarro; Maxime Cabanne; France	Edorta de Anta; Germán Luis Elkoro; Beñat Lizaso; Sergio Rodriguez; Euskadi	Aldo Serra; Guillermo Poggio; Andoni Irazusta; Franco Herrera; Argentina

== Medal table ==
* Host nation (Argentina)

Rank	Nation	Gold	Silver	Bronze	Total
1	Spain	7	9	2	18
2	Argentina*	5	0	3	8
3	Euskadi	4	7	1	12
4	Mexico	4	0	7	11
5	France	2	5	6	13
6	United States	0	1	1	2
7	Cuba	0	0	1	1
7	Uruguay	0	0	1	1
Totals (8 entries)		22	22	22	66
