= José María Igartua =

Spanish footballer

Personal information
- Full name: José María Igartua Mendizábal
- Date of birth: 6 March 1950 (age 76)
- Place of birth: Elorrio, Spain
- Height: 1.73 m (5 ft 8 in)
- Position: Defender

Youth career
- 1965–1968: Athletic Bilbao

Senior career*
Years	Team	Apps	(Gls)
1968–1975	Athletic Bilbao	118	(13)
1975–1977	Celta Vigo	50	(4)
1977–1981	Alavés	111	(11)
Total		279	(28)

International career
1968	Spain U23	1	(0)
- * Club domestic league appearances and goals

José María Igartua Mendizábal (born 6 March 1950) is a Spanish former footballer. He competed in the men's tournament at the 1968 Summer Olympics.

== Career ==
Igartua emerged from the youth system at Athletic Bilbao alongside Javier Clemente, with both players establishing themselves in the first team at the age of 18 after making their La Liga debut in the same match, against Elche in September 1968. After scoring a spectacular and important goal in the Inter-Cities Fairs Cup against Eintracht Frankfurt, Igartua started the 1969 Copa del Generalísimo Final, also against Elche, a 1–0 victory in Madrid.

In October 1970, he suffered a broken leg in a match against Celta Vigo which kept him out of the game for seven months, and when he returned, he could not reach the same high levels of performance as before the injury and was no longer a first choice at Athletic; he missed out on their 1973 Copa del Generalísimo Final success having featured in earlier rounds. By then, Clemente's playing career had also been ended prematurely due to injury.

In 1975 Igartua opted to move down to the second tier with Celta (managed by former Athletic goalkeeper Carmelo Cedrun and assisted by Pedrito, the man responsible for the broken leg five years earlier), helping the Galicians win promotion in his first season, although they were relegated in the second. He moved on again, returning to his native Basque Country with Deportivo Alavés, where he appeared regularly for four campaigns in the Segunda División before being forced to retire altogether aged 31 due to Spondylitis.

He remained involved in sport despite his physical problems, returning to Basque pelota in which he had been heavily involved in his teens before focusing on football. At the 1986 Basque Pelota World Championships, he won a bronze medal in the Paleta cuero (wooden bat and leather ball) variant of the game.
