= Basque Pelota World Cup =

Tournament information
- Sport: Basque pelota
- Established: 1995
- Number of tournaments: 18
- Administrator: FIPV

Current champion
- France (7th title)

The Basque Pelota World Cup (not to be confused with the Basque Pelota World Championship) is a set of four quadrennial tournaments organized by the International Federation of Basque Pelota on each of the disciplines of Basque Pelota: Trinquete, Fronton 30m, Fronton 36m and Fronton 54m. The FIPV organizes this tournaments on the years where the World Championship is not played.

== History ==
The first World Cup tournament was played in 1995, only for men, in the discipline of Fronton 36m, with the modalities of Hand pelota (individual and pairs), Paleta cuero and Pala corta. The second tournament was played in 1997 in the discipline of Trinquete, including modalities of Hand pelota (men's individual and pairs), Xare, Paleta cuero and Paleta goma (men and women). The third tournament was played in 1998 in the discipline of Fronton 30m, including modalities of Frontenis (men and women) and Paleta goma (men). In 2001, the first Fronton 54m World Cup was introduced, with the modality of Cesta Punta. In 2017, FIPV organized the first World Cup of a new discipline called Frontball, though this was not included as part of the 2018 World Championships. The last World Cups were held in 2021 (Fronton 30m and Fronton 54m) and were later discontinued in favor of the Basque Pelota League of Nations, which were held for the first time in 2024.

== Editions ==
=== Fronton 36m World Cup ===
Year	Host city and country	Best performing nations		
Year	Host city and country	1st place, gold medalist(s)	2nd place, silver medalist(s)	3rd place, bronze medalist(s)
1995	Pamplona, Spain	Spain	Cuba	France
1999	Almería, Spain	Spain	Cuba	France
2003	Brive, France	Spain	France	Argentina
2007	Barcelona, Spain	Spain	France	Argentina
2011	Brive, France	Canceled		
2017	Anglet, France	France	Spain	Mexico

=== Trinquete World Cup ===
Year	Host city and country	Best performing nations		
Year	Host city and country	1st place, gold medalist(s)	2nd place, silver medalist(s)	3rd place, bronze medalist(s)
1997	Bayonne, France	France	Argentina	Mexico
2000	Bayonne, France	Argentina; Spain		France
2004	Bayonne, France	France	Cuba; Mexico	
2008	Havana, Cuba	France	Spain	Mexico
2012	Pamplona, Spain	France	Mexico	Argentina
2015	Guadalajara - Tepic, Mexico	Argentina	Spain	France
2019	Oloron-Sainte-Marie - Pau, France	France	Mexico	Spain

=== Fronton 30m World Cup ===
Year	Host city and country	Best performing nations		
Year	Host city and country	1st place, gold medalist(s)	2nd place, silver medalist(s)	3rd place, bronze medalist(s)
1998	Valencia, Spain	Mexico	Argentina	Spain
2001	Palencia, Spain	Mexico	Argentina; France	
2005	Elche, Spain	Mexico	Spain	Argentina
2009	Tenerife, Spain	Spain	Mexico	Argentina
2016	Santiago, Chile	Mexico	France	Argentina
2021	Valencia, Spain	Spain	Mexico	Argentina

=== Fronton 54m World Cup ===
Year	Host city and country	Best performing nations		
Year	Host city and country	1st place, gold medalist(s)	2nd place, silver medalist(s)	3rd place, bronze medalist(s)
2001	Havana, Cuba	France	Cuba	Spain
2005	Acapulco, Mexico	France	Spain	Mexico
2009	Palencia, Spain	France	Mexico	Spain
2013	Mexico, Mexico	Spain	Mexico	France
2017	Biarritz, France	France	Spain A	Spain B
2021	Zinacantepec, Mexico	Spain B	Spain A	France A

=== Frontball World Cup ===
Year	Host city and country	Best performing nations		
Year	Host city and country	1st place, gold medalist(s)	2nd place, silver medalist(s)	3rd place, bronze medalist(s)
2017	Tepito, Mexico	France	Spain	Mexico

== See also ==
- Basque Pelota World Championships
