= Frontenis =

Sport

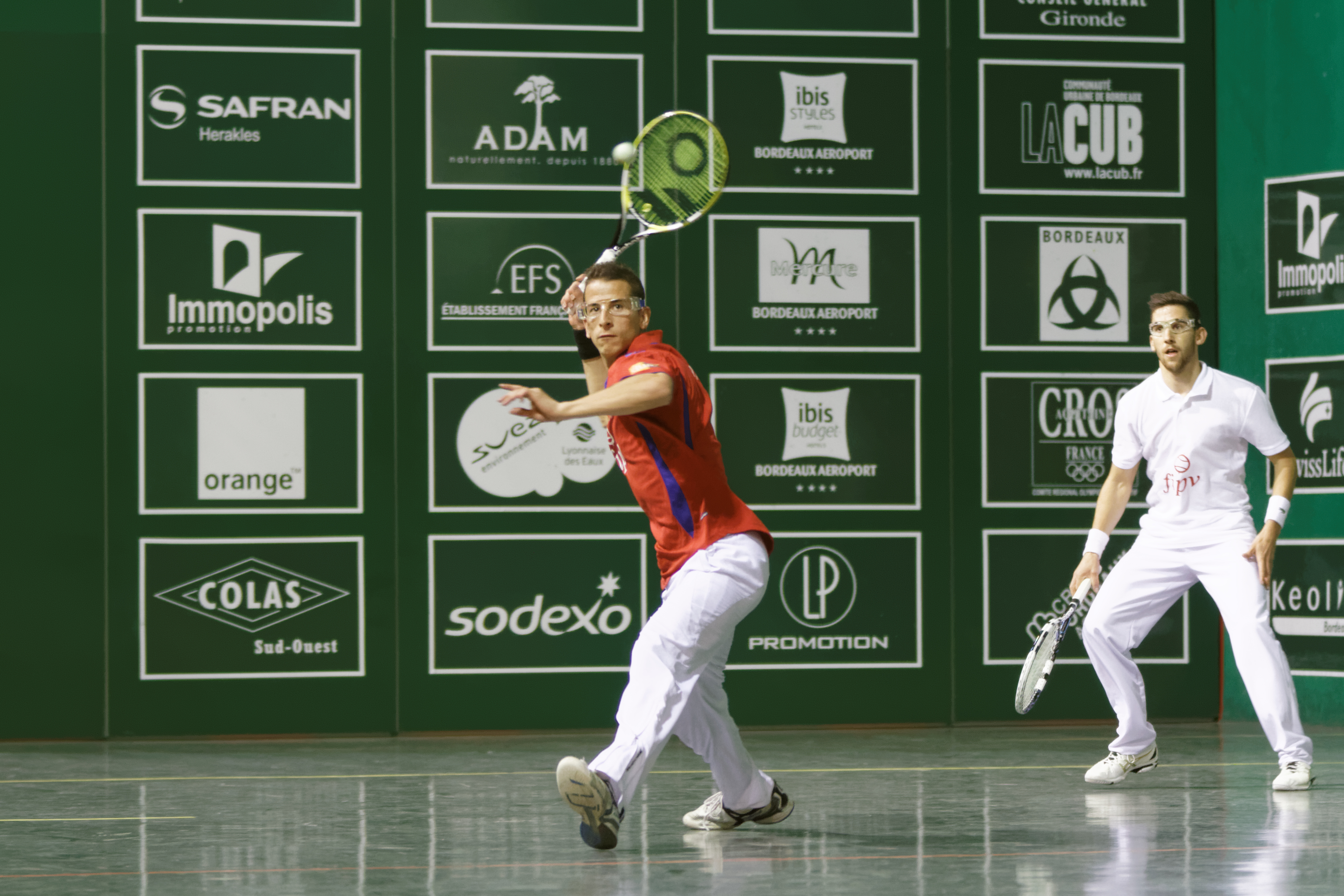
Frontenis match

Frontenis is a sport that is played in a 30 meter pelota court using racquets (a tennis racquet or a similar frontenis racquet) and rubber balls. It can be played in pairs or singles, but only pairs frontenis is played in international competitions. This sport was developed in Mexico around 1900, and is accredited as a Basque pelota speciality.

In frontenis, one player of the pair hits the ball with the racquet toward the front wall. The ball must strike the playable surface of the front wall and return to the playable area of the court. The opposing players must strike the ball before it bounces a second time on the floor of the court. As with other racquet sports, the best stroke is one that the opponent cannot return. Frontenis demands having a great mobility, skill, physical agility, mental agility, coordination and training.

For many years, frontenis was played only in Mexico, Spain, Argentina, and a few other countries, but now it is played in approximately eighteen countries worldwide.

== History ==
Frontenis was created in Mexico in 1900. Several famous tennis players (Buttlin, Sharp, Crowle, Pérez Verdia, Maldonado, Clifford, etc.) started playing with rackets and a tennis ball hitting it against a wall. This new game, with its first modern pelota court, built in Fernando Torreblanca’s house (Mexico), was called “frontontenis” (from fronton and tenis — “pelota court” and “tennis” in Spanish, respectively), and later its name was reduced to “frontenis”.

Because of the increase of the number of pelota players, pelota courts proliferated, and frontenis expanded from Mexico to neighboring countries and later to Europe. Frontenis was introduced into the Iberian Peninsula in the 1940s by way of the Canary Islands. In the 1960s, Olympic ball was introduced in Mexico, and many Mexican players travelled to Spain to teach the technique. The game and all its innovations were taken from Spain to the other countries of Europe.

Every European country that plays pelota is member of the Union of European Basque Pelota Federations (UEBPF), and all the countries that play Basque pelota are members of the International Federation of Basque Pelota (IFBP).

Frontenis (recognized by the IFBP) started being played in international competitions in 1952, with the First World Championship held in Donostia-San Sebastian (Spain).

== The court ==
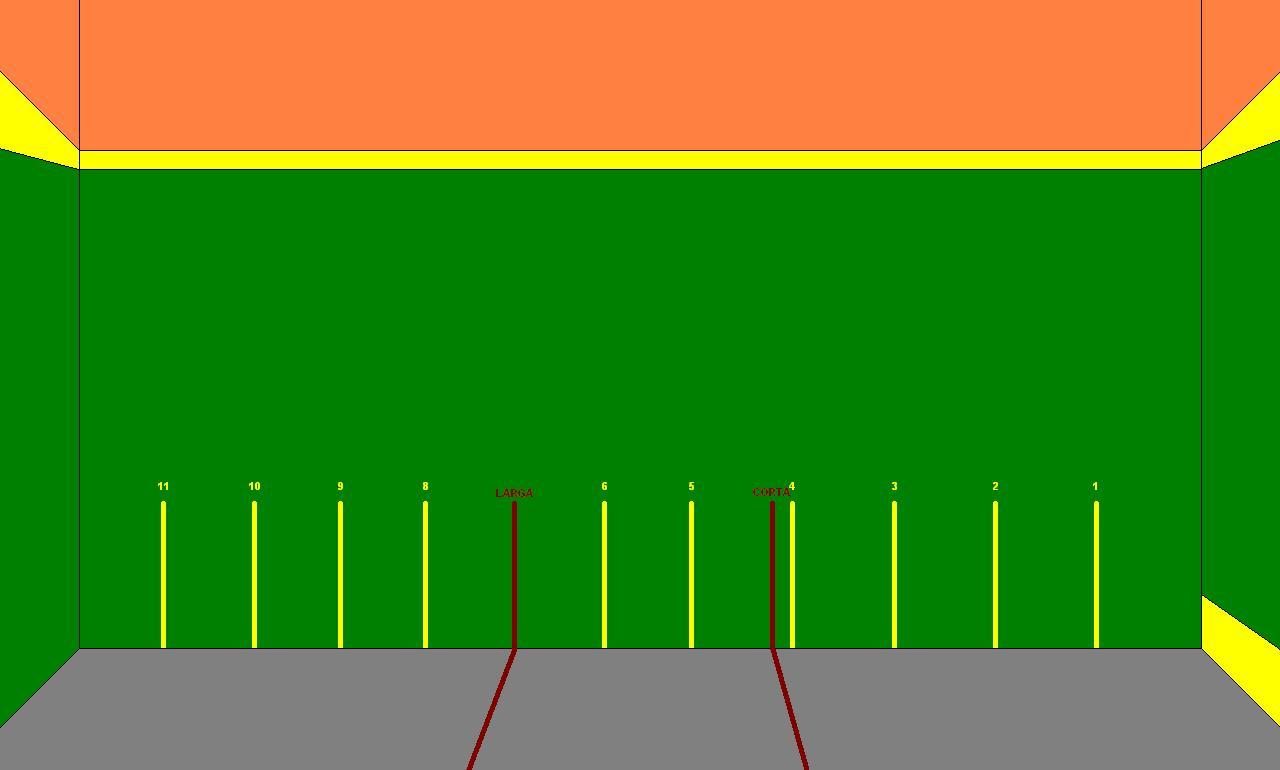
Frontenis Court

The court used in frontenis is a pelota court of the Very Short type — 30 meters long, 10 meters wide and 10 meters high. Its walls must have signs to establish the distances of service, and to help the players to situate themselves in the court. There are several parts that form the court:

=== Front wall (frontis) ===
This is the wall at the front of the court faced by the players. Every ball hit by a player must strike this wall before touching the ground to be valid. The front wall measures 10 meters wide by 10 meters high. The lower 60 centimeters of this wall is not a legally playable surface. The upper limit of this non-playable surface is covered with a 10-centimeter-wide metallic sheet (chapa in Spanish, txapa in Basque) that audibly indicates an impact on the upper part of the non-playable surface.

=== Left wall or help wall ===
The wall is to the players' left as they face the front wall. It is marked with lines every 3.5 meters, measured from the front of the court. On its upper rim is located a 10 centimeter wide metallic sheet that signals a ball striking outside of the playable area. This wall with its markings helps players situate themselves within the court.

=== Rebound wall ===
It is the wall situated in the back of the court. It has no markings and is the same size as the front wall. It has 10 centimeter metallic sheets on its rims to give an audible indication of a ball striking outside of the playable area. Many pelota courts lack this wall, and are therefore not used for official competitions.

== The racket and the strings ==
The racquet used in frontenis is, according to Spanish Pelota Federation (SPF), “similar or equal to tennis racquets, made of wood, fiber, metal or graphite. Weight and stringing are not limited, and double strings can be used. The racquets' length and width are not limited.”

Racquets have evolved considerably since the beginning of professional frontenis in 1900. Much of this evolution has paralleled standard tennis racquets

At first, racquets were made of wood and the strings were made of animal gut. These were very heavy and did not provide comfortable play, but they were used for more than thirty years until the great player Jose, the “Poison” Becerra revolutionized the sport. Manufacturers that made tennis products started to manufacture parallel products for frontenis when Becerra started to win championships. In the 1990s a Mexican company, “Master Pro”, was created exclusively to manufacture frontenis products. Recently, other companies have appeared specializing in frontenis equipment.

Simple strings is used in Preolympic frontenis, and the tension varies depending on the ball — Penn strings require 15-19 kilos, VIP strings require 17-21 kilos, and Champion Elite strings require 17-23 kilos. Double strings (duplication of 4 horizontal strings and 3 vertical strings) are used in Olympic frontenis in order to give more effect to the ball. Double stringing demands higher tensions, between 21 and 27 kilos.

== The ball ==
The ball in Olympic frontenis (the only modality accepted by the IFBP) is the Olympic ball.

Originally, the sport was played with ordinary tennis balls, but the fiber cover of these balls slowed them excessively, reduced their bounce, and made the game very slow. To speed the game, the fabric cover of the tennis balls was removed. Later, balls made of oilcloth were imported from England and the United States with the goal of further speeding the game.

During the Second World War, ball imports ceased, and Francisco Beltran was forced to look for substitutes. He experimented with pressurizing rubber balls. After the Second World War, Beltran started manufacturing improved balls.

A few years later the first frontenis ball company, “201”, was founded by Francisco Beltran who contributed his ball designs and Doctor Jesus Ledezma who provided financing. Ball design continues to evolve.
