= Fronton (court) =

Type of court

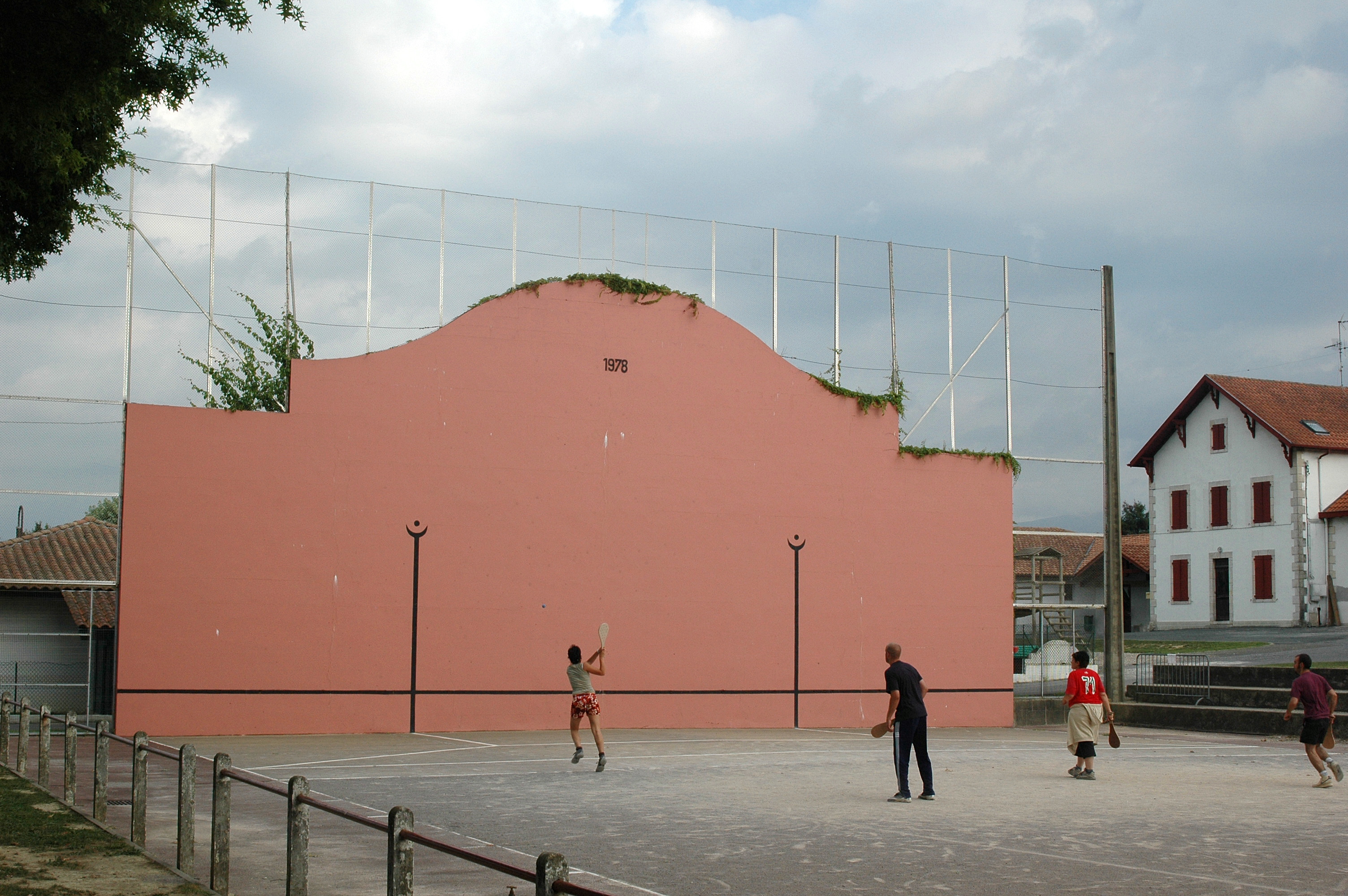
Game at open-air Ustaritz fronton

A fronton (Spanish: frontón; Basque: frontoi or pilotaleku; French: fronton) is a two-walled or single-walled court used as a playing area for Basque pelota.

== History ==
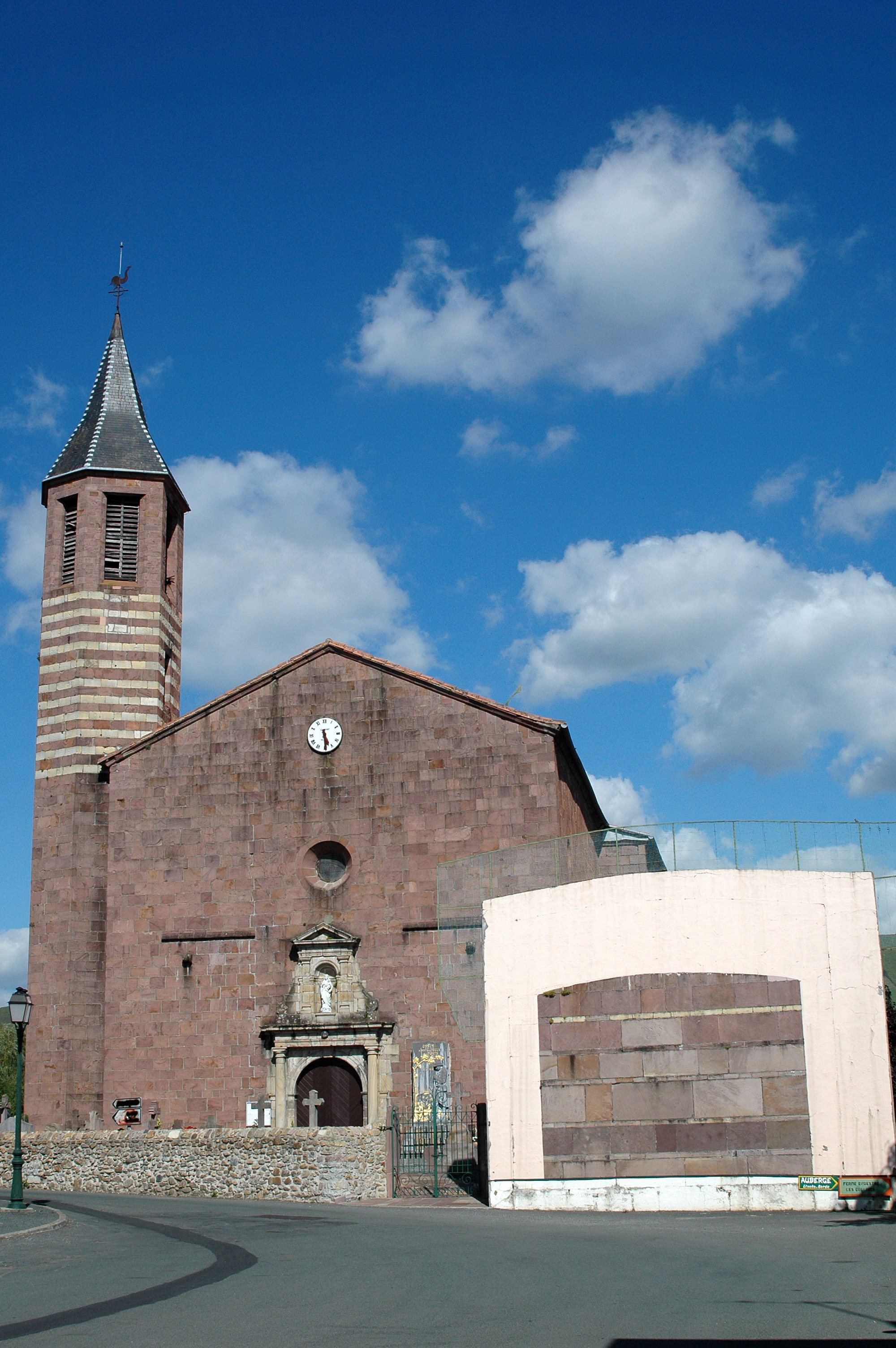
fronton at Ossès Church

The front wall of the first frontons in villages was usually the wall of a church. Because the games being played close by, several priests would play pelota along with the villagers and got to be well-known players and often served as referees in provincial or town competitions but were out of the picture when it turned into a commercialized sport. Because of the increasing popularity of the game, many churches put up signs forbidding pelota games on their porches. The games were also played in town halls, but when the game turned into a highly popular entertainment in the region, towns started to build special frontons in open-air or closed courts.

== Characteristics ==
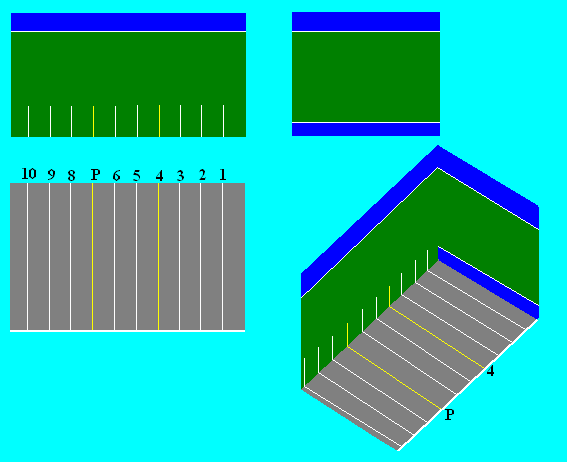
Basque pelota fronton diagram 1: Side wall; 2: Front wall; 3:Ground; 4: Perspective view (lower and upper zones in blue)

There are two main types of frontons, the first one being the single-wall fronton, prevalent on the eastern Basque Country, while two-wall frontons are typically located in present-day Basque Autonomous Community, a large part of Navarre, and La Rioja. A two-wall fronton is made up of a rectangular floor and three vertical walls, named frontis; the front wall is the main one, where the hits are directed according to the rules. That wall has a line at a determined height named Bajo Chapa (Lower Zone). Perpendicular to the front wall is attached another longer wall, with marks for the distance to the main wall. The number of marks depends on the type of fronton used. Perpendicular to the side wall is the back wall. The height of the three walls must be the same for professional courts. Often, in common rural open-air courts, the place where the back wall should be is delimited by a line on the floor. A free wall sideline is delimited to make watching the game easier for an audience or other players. In every kind of fronton, the sidelines are 4.5 m apart.

== Fronton sizes ==
Frontons
Type	Front and Back Walls			Ground		Side wall	
Size	Long	Wide	Lower and upper zones(front)	Long	Wide	Long	Wide
1. Very short court	10m	11m	0.60m	30m	10m	10m	30m
2. Short Court	10m	11m	1m	36m	10m	10m	36m
3. Long court	10m	11m	1m	54m	10m	10m	54m
4. Trinquet	10m	11m	0.60m	28.5m	10m	10m	28.5m
Source: Consejo Superior de Deportes

=== Very short court ===
This kind of court is 30 m long and is used professionally only for frontenis and paleta-rubber variants.

=== Short court ===
This 36 m court is used professionally for hand-pelota, paleta-leather and short bat variants.

=== Long court ===
This 54 m court is used professionally for long bat, remonte and basket variants.

=== Trinquet ===
This 28.5 m court has a somewhat different shape than the others: with an inclined roof all along the left wall. It allows the variants of handball, paleta-rubber, paleta-leather and xare. It is used almost exclusively in the Northern Basque Country, but also in some places of León and Castilla.

=== Place libre ===
This 100 m open-air court is used for playing Grand Chistera in France and has no side walls, the limit for play is at 80 m from the fronton. This court is not recognised by the International Federation of Basque Pelota and cannot be used for international competitions.

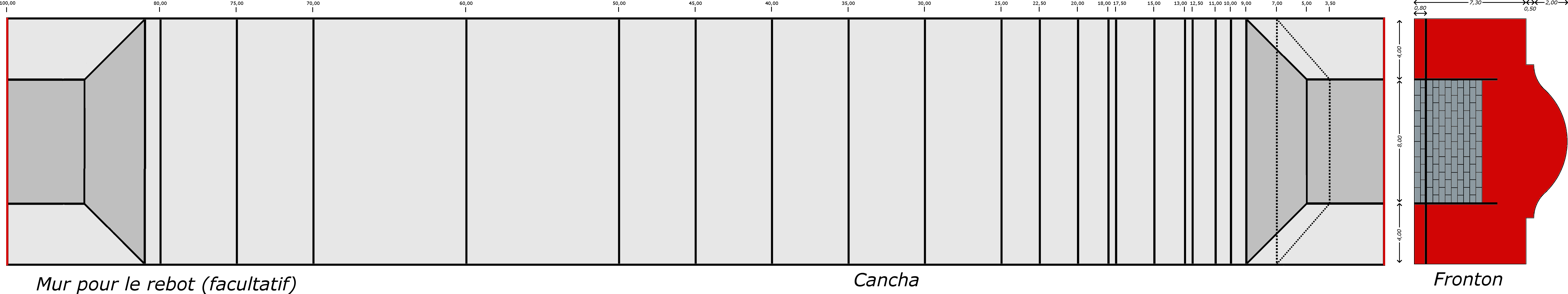
Image for a "place libre" fronton from the French Basque Pelota Federation

== Fronton marks ==
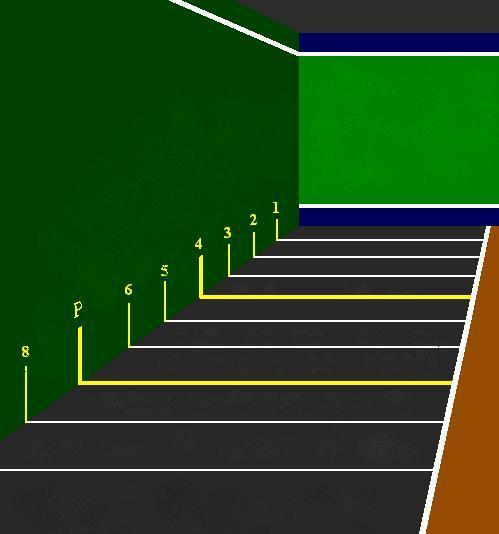
Typical distribution of the marks in a fronton

The marks on the fronton must create a notable contrast with the color of the field. To make the difference visible, the marks are often painted.

=== Sideline ===
The sideline line is 15 cm wide and parallel to the side wall. This line marks the limit between the playing ground and the exterior.

=== Lower and upper zones ===
The lower zone line is 15 cm wide and the height depends on the size of the fronton (see chart). The upper zone is frequently marked at 10 m high on the wall and the line is also 15 cm wide.

=== Cuadros (squares) ===
The squares are the lines painted on the side wall and the ground, used to mark the places of service, falta, and pasa. From square to square the distance is 4 m (long fronton) or 3 m (Very short and short frontons).

=== Falta (fail) and Pasa (pass) ===
The falta line is located in the fourth square, while pasa is located in the seventh square; both lines are 15 cm wide. In the Olympic version, the falta is in the third square and the pasa on the fifth square.

=== Service line ===
The service line is often located in the fifth square, usually in racquet, cesta punta, and paleta-rubber, or in the fourth square, usually in hand categories.

== Ball games played in frontons ==
- Pelota mano
- Pelota vasca
- Pilota valenciana
- Frontenis
- Cesta-punta
- Remonte
- Xare
- Pala corta
- Paleta
- Paleta goma
- Paleta cuero
- Paleta goma maciza
- Jai alai

== Gallery ==
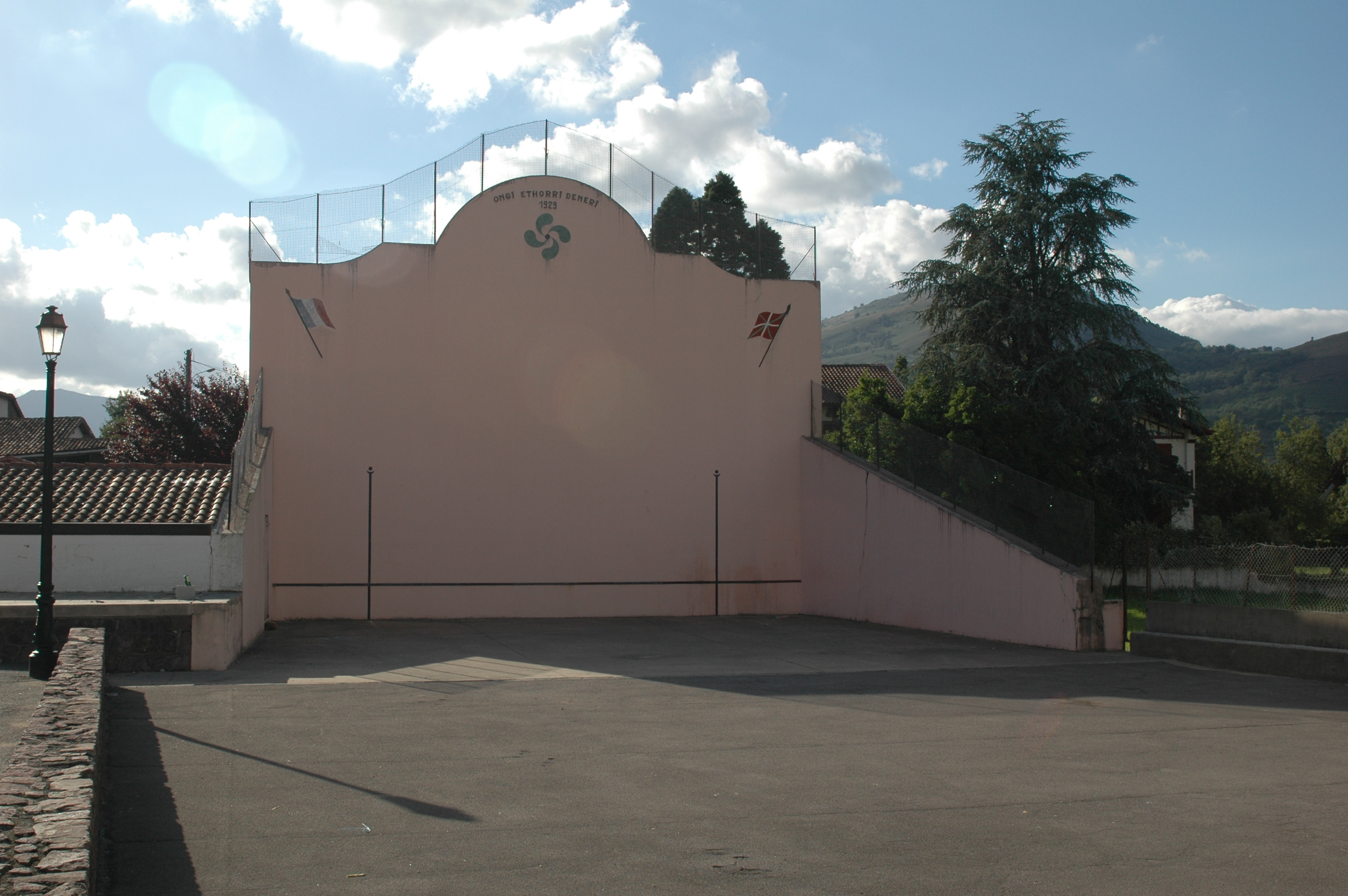
Open-air single walled fronton in Ascarat.

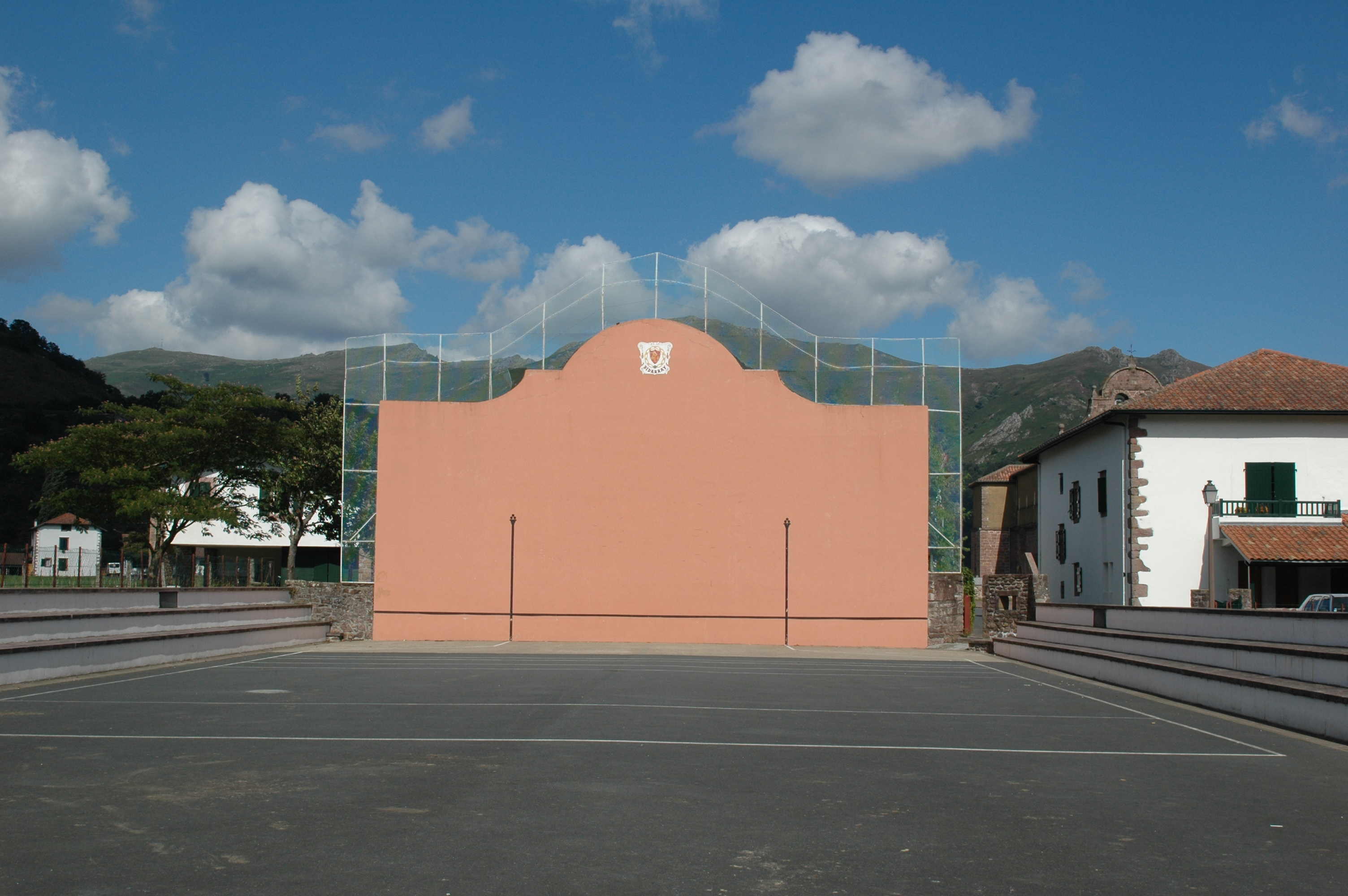
Open-air single walled fronton in Bidarray.

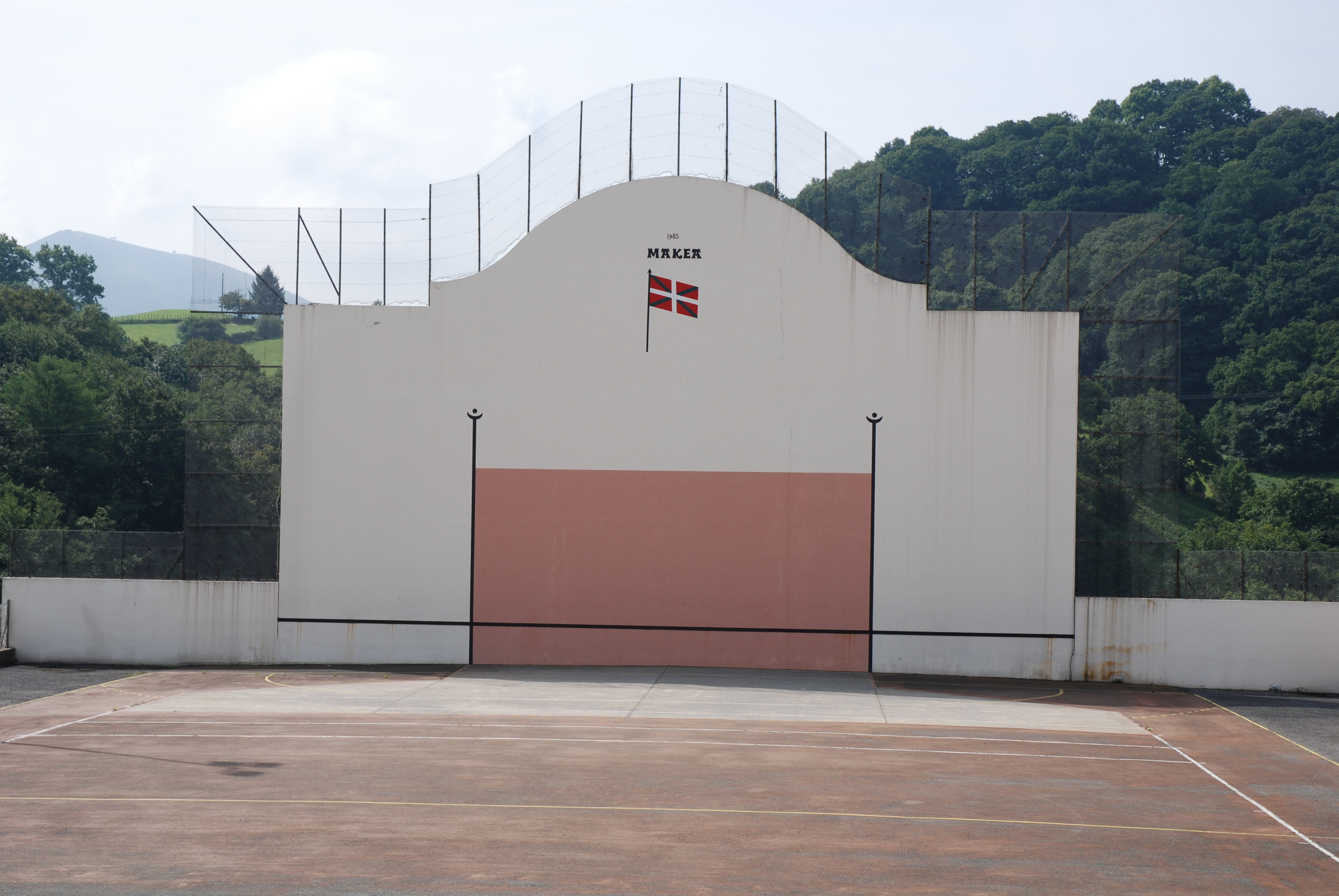
Open-air single walled fronton in Macaye.

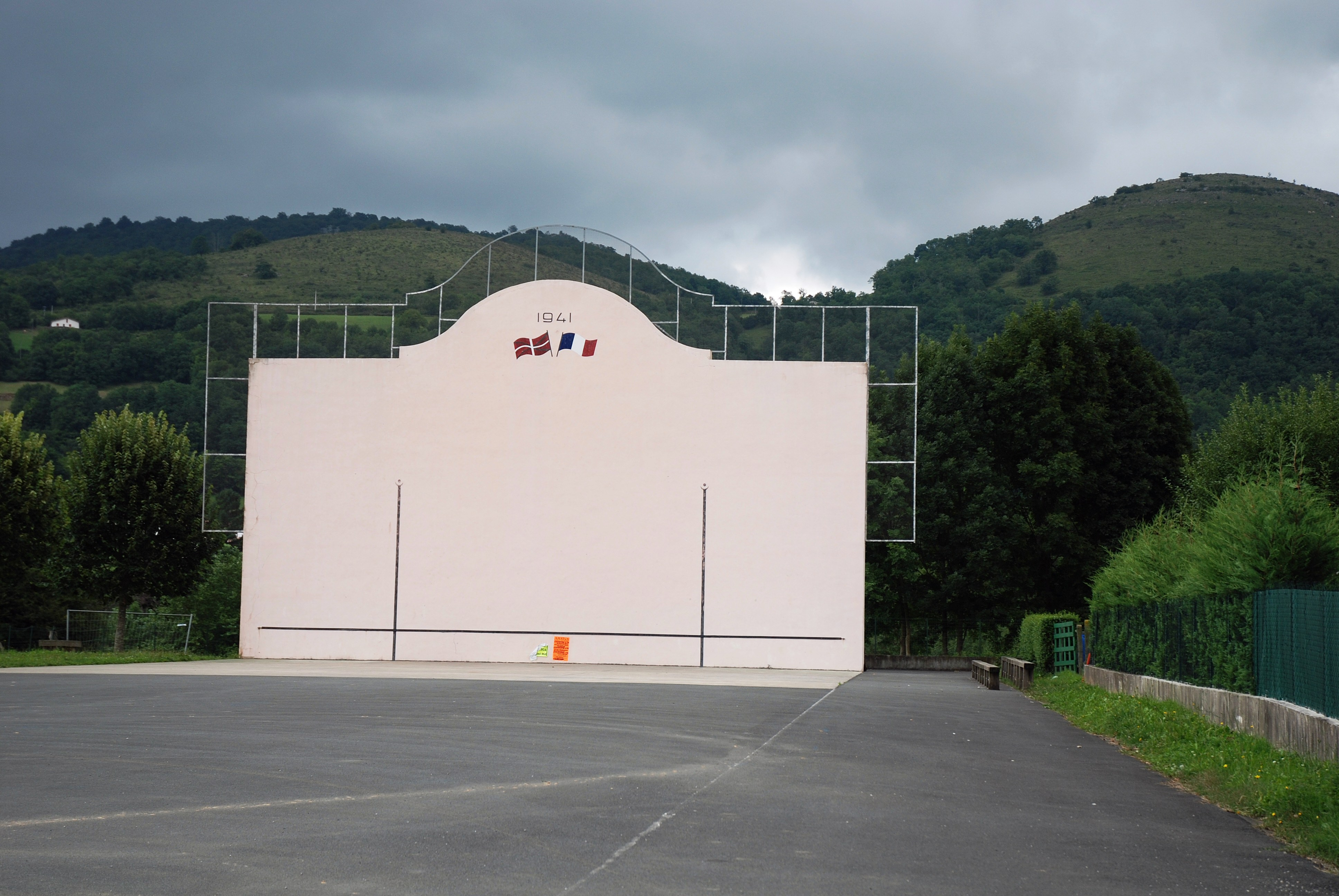
Open-air single walled fronton in Lecumberry.

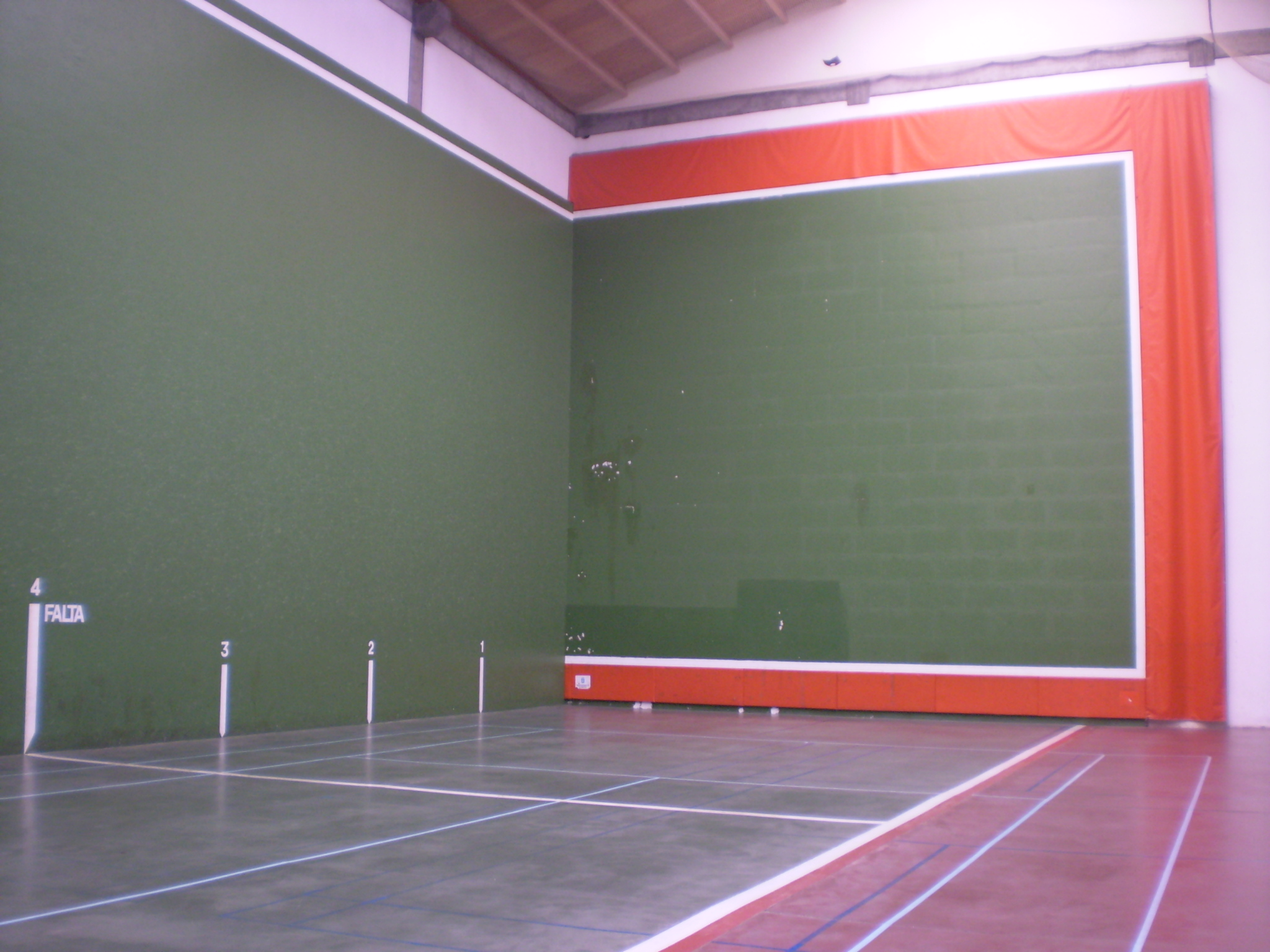
Covered short fronton in A Coruña.

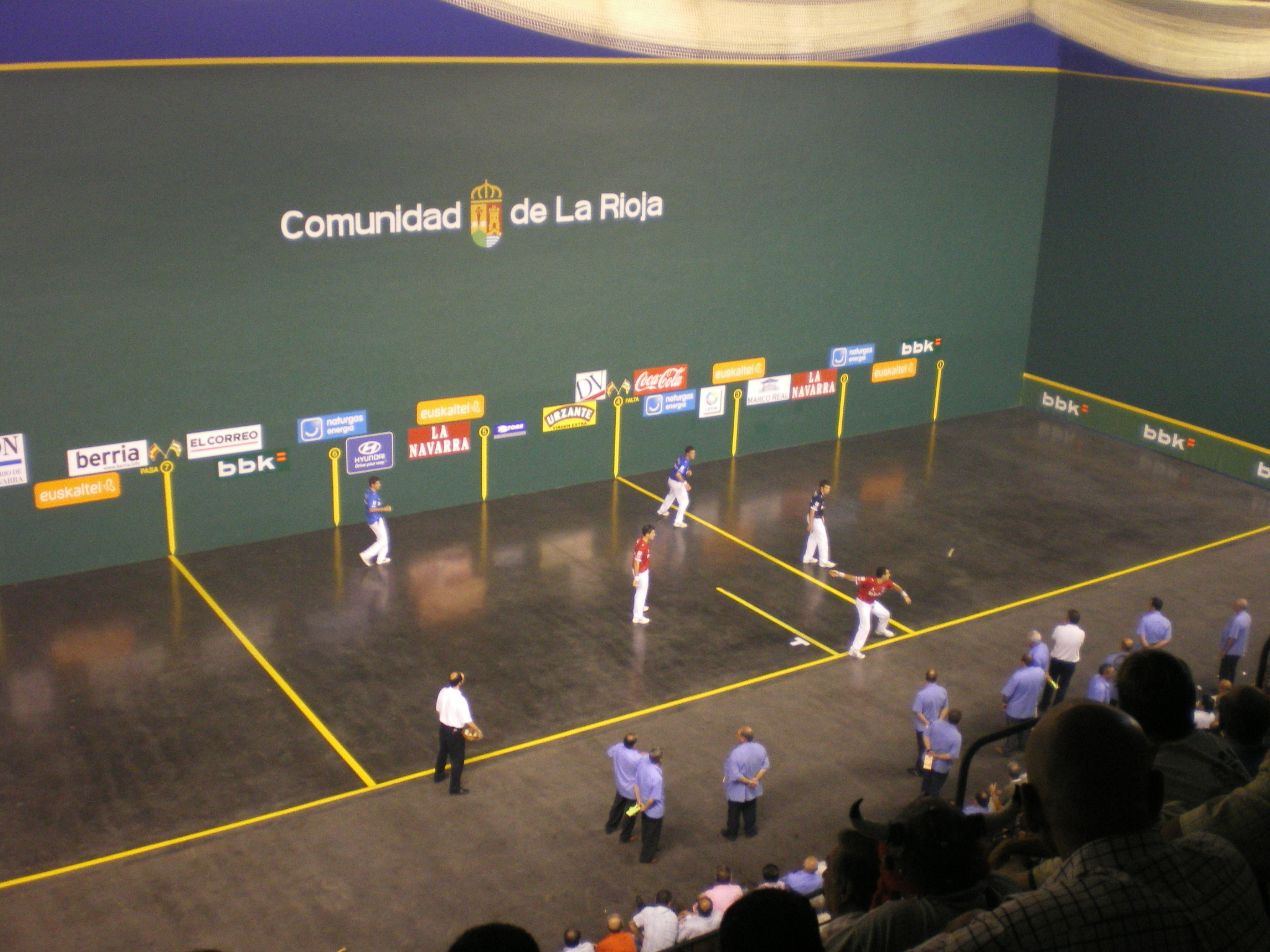
Adarraga fronton.

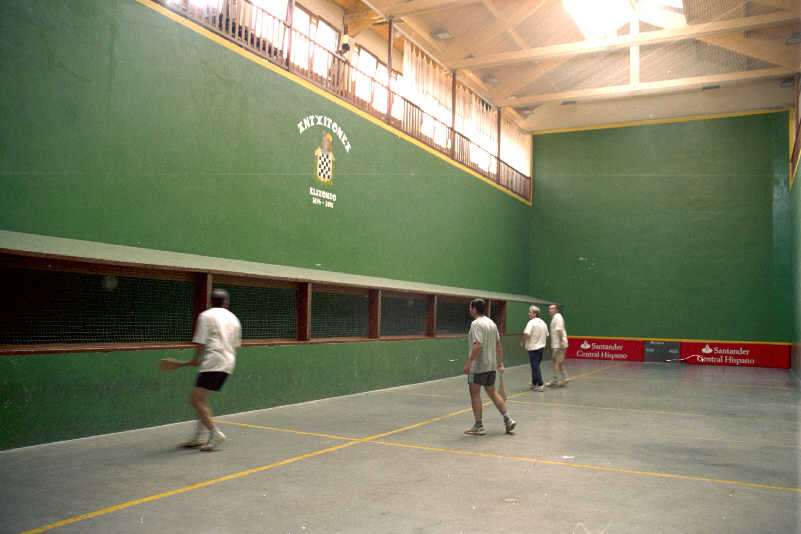
Covered Trinquete Elizondo

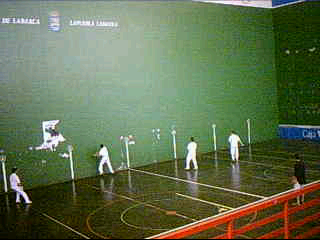
Doubles hand-pelota game at Lamaca fronton

== See also ==
- Valencian frontó
- Basque pelota
