= International Federation of Basque Pelota =

IOC-recognised worldwide governing body for Basque pelota

- Sport: Basque pelota
- Category: Professional Men (1st and 2nd); Professional Women (1st and 2nd); Amateur (men and women)
- Jurisdiction: Spain
- Abbreviation: FIPV
- Founded: 1929
- Regional affiliation: 4 / 33 Members
- Headquarters: Pamplona, Spain
- President: (Mexico) (France) Xavier Cazaubon
- Chairman: (Spain) Julián García Angulo

Official website
- fipv.net/en/

The International Federation of Basque Pelota (Spanish: Federación Internacional de Pelota Vasca (FIPV), Basque: Euskal Pilotaren Nazioarteko Federakuntza) is the worldwide governing body for Basque pelota, recognized by the International Olympic Committee. It sets the regulations for international competition and organizes the competitions.

== Membership ==
The FIPV is a sports federation recognized by the following confederations:

- International Olympic Committee (IOC)
- Association of IOC Recognised International Sports Federations (ARISF)
- SportAccord (GAISF)

== History ==
The International federation of Basque pelota was established on 19 May 1929 in Buenos Aires, Argentina brought into being by the French Federation of Basque Pelota, the Spanish Federation of Basque Pelota and the Argentinian Federation of Basque Pelota. Due to the outbreak of World War II and the Spanish Civil War, their activities were restricted until 1945. In 1946 the official modalities regulated by the federation were defined, and its specific rules set for equality of the participant country federations and the international championships. The headquarters of the federation are currently located in Pamplona, Spain.

President	Years active
Jean Ybarnégaray	1929–1946
Manuel Balet Crous	1946–1954
Carmelo Balda Galarraga	1954–1969
Javier Gil de Biedma	1970–1978
Jesús Fernández Iriondo	1978–1994
Enrique Gaytán de Ayala	1994–2002
Dominique Boutineau	2002–2014
Xavier Cazaubon	2014–present

== Categories ==
The internationally recognized modalities in which the Basque Pelota World Championships is contested are the following:

- Hand-pelota (Basque: esku huska; Spanish: pelota mano), played barehanded (36m Fronton and Trinquete)
- Rubber-paleta (Basque: gomazko paleta; Spanish: paleta goma), played with a short and broad wooden bat (called paleta) and a rubber ball (30m Fronton and Trinquete)
- Leather-paleta (Basque: cuero paleta; Spanish: paleta cuero), similar to the previous one but played with a traditional leather ball (36m Fronton and Trinquete)
- Short-bat, (Spanish: paleta corta), played with a shorter, thicker and much narrower bat and a leather ball (36m Fronton)
- Xare, which means "net" in Basque, played with a wooden ring strung with a net, similar to a tennis racket (Trinquete)
- Jai alai, (Basque: zesta punta; Spanish: cesta punta; both meaning literally 'edged basket'), played with a special glove that extends into a long pointed curved basket (hence the name) (54m Fronton)
- Frontenis, it uses tennis rackets (30m Fronton)
- Frontball

== Participating national federations ==
Source in April 2022:

=== Regions ===
Number	Region	Countries
1	Africa	2
2	Asia	4
3	Europe	6
4	Americas	21
Total	World	33

1. Africa: Guinea, Togo
2. Asia: Philippines, India, China, Iran
3. Europe: Belgium, Spain, France, Italy, Poland, Portugal
4. Americas: Argentina, Bolivia, Costa Rica, Cuba, Ecuador, El Salvador, United States, Guatemala, Canada, Chile, Brazil, Mexico, Nicaragua, Panama, Paraguay, Peru, Puerto Rico, Dominican Republic, Uruguay, Venezuela, Haiti

=== Countries ===
International Federation is constituted by 27 national federations in 2010. In 2022 it had 33 members.

Country	Federation
Spain	Spanish Federation of Basque Pelota
France	French Federation of Basque Pelota
Argentina	Argentinian Federation of Basque Pelota
Canada	Canadian Federation of Basque Pelota
United States	United States Federation of Basque Pelota
Mexico	Mexican Federation of Basque Pelota
Uruguay	Uruguayan Federation of Basque Pelota
Italy	Italian Federation of Basque Pelota
Philippines	Filipino Federation of Basque Pelota
Greece	Greek Federation of Basque Pelota
India	Indian Basque Palota Federation
Belgium	Belgian Federation of Basque Pelota
Netherlands	Dutch Federation of Basque Pelota
Venezuela	Venezuelan Federation of Basque Pelota
Puerto Rico	Puerto Rican Federation of Basque Pelota
Peru	Peruvian Federation of Basque Pelota
Paraguay	Paraguayan Federation of Basque Pelota
Nicaragua	Nicaraguan Federation of Basque Pelota
Guatemala	Guatemalan Federation of Basque Pelota
El Salvador	El Salvador Federation of Basque Pelota
Ecuador	Ecuadorian Federation of Basque Pelota
Chile	Chilean Federation of Basque Pelota
Cuba	Cuban Federation of Basque Pelota
Costa Rica	Costa Rica Federation of Basque Pelota
Brazil	Brazilian Federation of Basque Pelota
Bolivia	Bolivian Federation of Basque Pelota

=== Medal table ===
The current medal table for Basque Pelota World Championships from 1952 to 2022 is as follows:

Rank	Nation	Gold (Note: This table includes all modalities, including those being played in Plaza Libre in 1952 and 1958.)	Silver	Bronze (Note: No bronze medals were disputed from 1952 to 1966.)	Total
1	Spain	80	82	41	203
2	France	71	68	53	192
3	Mexico	53	44	34	131
4	Argentina	48	26	21	95
5	Uruguay	4	30	15	49
6	Cuba	3	5	17	25
7	United States	0	2	3	5
8	Chile	0	0	6	6
9	India	0	0	0	0

== See also ==
- Basque Pelota World Cup
