= Basque trinquete =

Type of indoor ball court

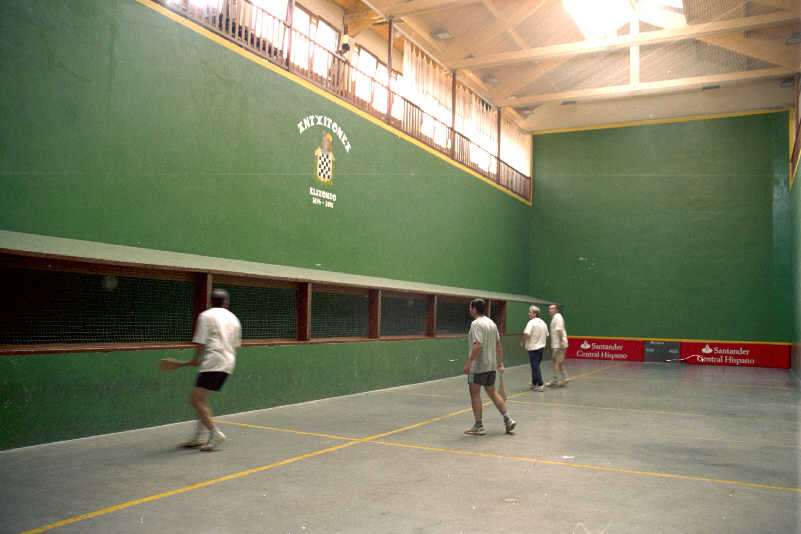
Trinquete in Elizondo, Navarre

A trinquete (also trinquet) is a special court for various indoor versions of pelota and it is a modality of the pelota sport. In South America, especially in Argentina the trinquete is also known as close court, because the other open court is named for the fronton. It has some of the characteristic features of a real tennis court, probably because many real tennis courts were converted to trinquetes in the 19th century. For some sports, the players face the same wall and share the court, similar to squash. For other sports, a net is strung across the middle of the court and the players face each other, similar to tennis.

== Features of the court and the game ==
The trinquet has some basic aspects with the fronton.

- One front wall called frontis, which is the wall where the players must throw the ball in each play. The wall has some delimitations. At 80 cm height there is a metallic sheet called chapa". Another metal sheet is located 8,5 metres up the floor. The front wall normally is 10 metres in height and 10 metres in width. The space that is between the upper chapa and the finish of the frontis is normally padded, so that it is obvious (by sound and ball action) a fault has occurred when the ball hits this area. Below, there is also another paddled area from the floor to the below chapa.
- There is another wall parallelly collocated more or less 30 metres back the frontis called rebote. This wall is 5 or 4 metres lower than the other.
- A wall on the left side of the court joins the frontis and rebote. It is a little bit lower than the front wall and a bit higher than the back wall.

== See also ==
- Valencian trinquet
