= Basque pelota =

Variety of court sports

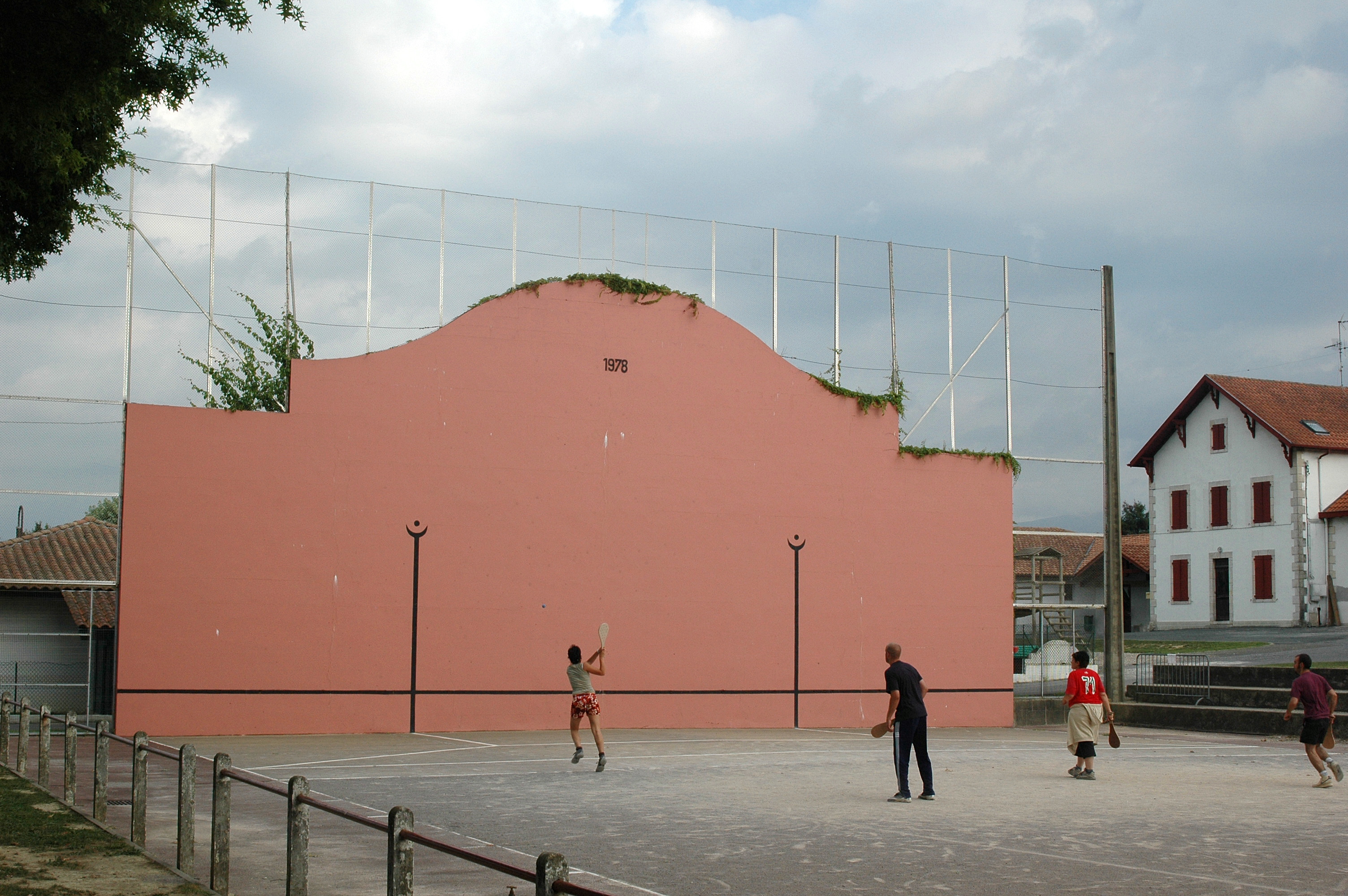
- A game of pelota as played in Ustaritz
- Highest governing body: International Federation of Basque Pelota
- Nicknames: Pelota
- First played: 13th century

Characteristics
- Contact: No
- Team members: Single or doubles
- Type: Hand sport, Racquet sport, Basket sport
- Equipment: Basque pelota ball

Presence
- Olympic: Part of the Summer Olympic programme in 1900; Demonstrated at the 1924, 1968 and 1992 Summer Olympics; Recognized as an Olympic sport

Basque pelota (Basque: pilota, Spanish: pelota vasca, French: pelote basque) is the name for a variety of court sports played with a ball using one's hand, a racket, a wooden bat or a basket, against a wall (frontis or fronton) or, more traditionally, with two teams face to face separated by a line on the ground or a net. The roots of this class of games can be traced to the Greeks and other ancient cultures.

The term pelota probably comes from the Vulgar Latin term pilotta (ball game). It is a diminutive form of the word pila which may relate to a hard linen or leather ball filled with pilus (fur or hair) or to the Latin words for strike or spade and is related to the English word pellet.

Modern Basque pelota is played in several countries. In Europe, this sport is concentrated in Spain and France, especially in the Basque Country. The sport is also played in Latin American countries such as Argentina, Chile, Uruguay, and Cuba. Operated as a gaming enterprise called jai alai, it is seen in parts of the U.S. such as Florida, Connecticut, Nevada, and Rhode Island.

In Valencia, Valencian pilota is considered the national sport; it is also played in Belgium, northern Italy, Mexico, and Argentina.

Since its creation, the International Federation of Basque Pelota has standardised the different varieties into four modalities and fourteen disciplines, with fixed ball weights, rules and court sizes. The four modalities—30 metres (33 yd) wall, 36 metres (39 yd) wall, 54 metres (59 yd) wall and trinquete—admit fourteen disciplines, depending the use of bare hand, leather ball, rubber ball, paleta (pelota paleta), racket (frontennis) and xare. Two of the fourteen disciplines are played by both men and women (frontenis and rubber pelota in trinquete); the other twelve are played only by men. This allows championship play at the international level, and allows the participation of players and teams from around the world using the same rules. There is, however, criticism about this, since purists might argue that some of the original traits of each particular modality could be lost.

Even with protection, accidents do happen. With the ball easily travelling at 200 kilometres per hour (120 mph), pelota can kill if safety equipment is not used properly or at all; while rare, occasional deaths do occur.

== History ==
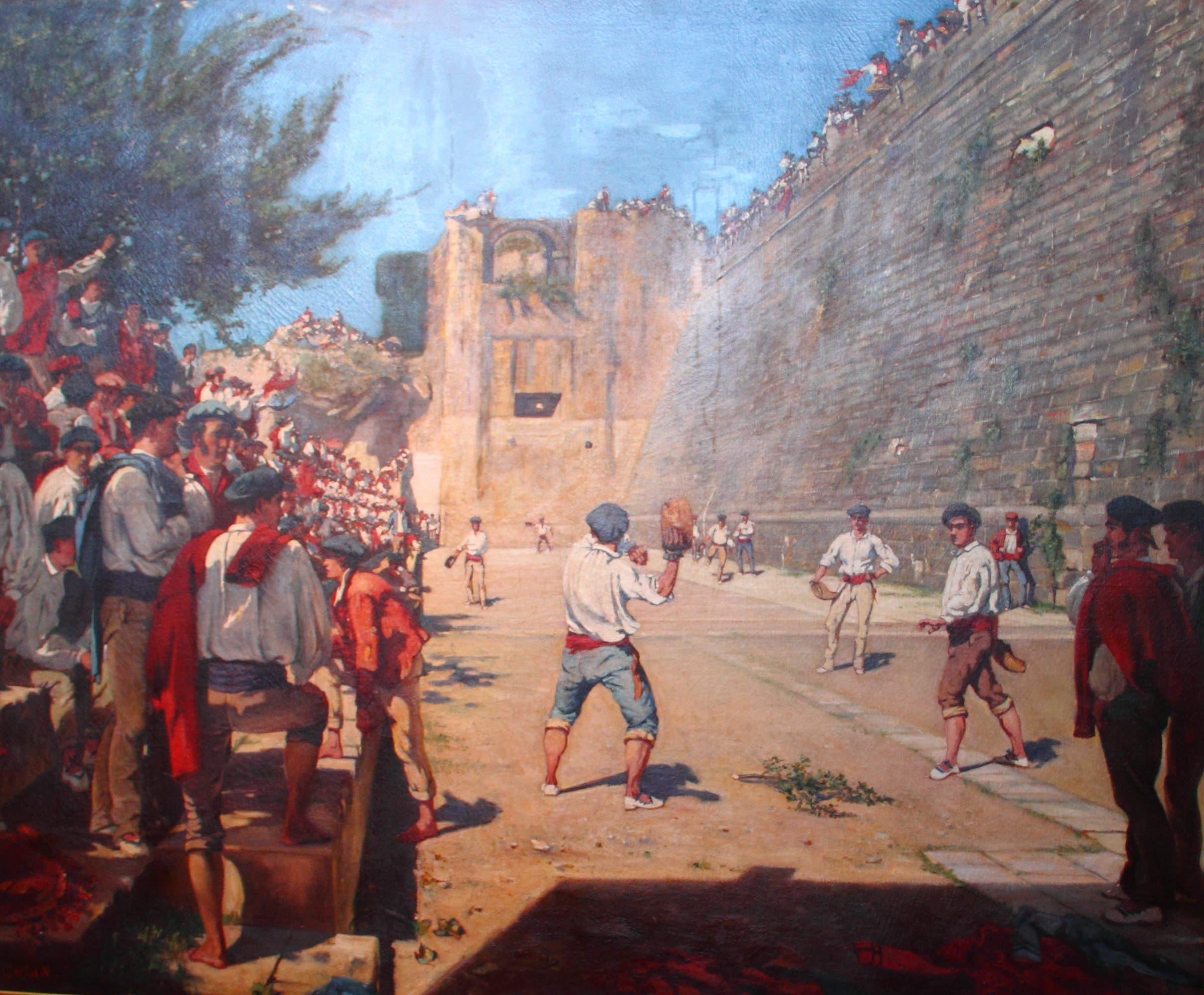
Basque Pelota's game under the Hondarribia's City walls, by Gustave-Henri Colin in 1863.

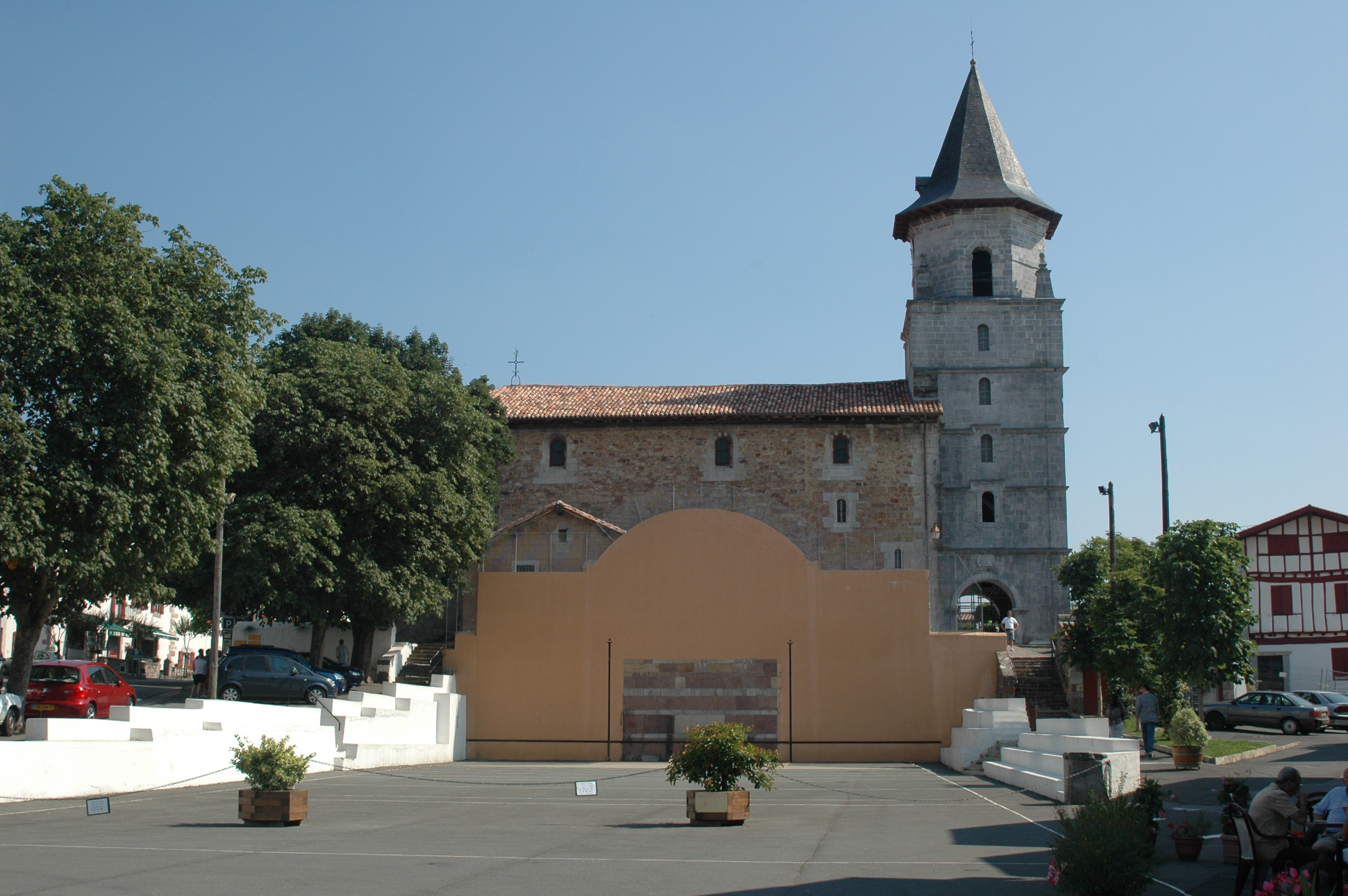
Frontoi in Ainhoa (Labourd)

The origin of this sport is tied to the decline of the ancient jeu de paume (jeu de paume au gant), ca. 1700. While the game evolved to the modern jeu de paume (with racquet, called real tennis in England) and eventually to lawn tennis, rural Alpine and Pyrenean communities kept the tradition.

In the Basque Country the "pasaka" and "laxoa", local versions of the paume evolved to the peculiar style of the pilota: instead of playing face to face, with a net in the midfield, the Basques began to fling the ball against a wall.

According to the Basque pilota historian Chipitey Etcheto, the first recorded matches took place in Napoleonic times; it is believed that the game was close to currently rare speciality of "rebot".

The mid-19th century saw the explosion of the "pelota craze". The player "Gantxiki" is considered the original "father" of the chistera, the basket-shaped racquet that can propel the ball at high speeds, introduced around 1850.

The top champions of the end of the 19th century, such as "Chiquito de Cambo", were immensely popular and the best-paid sportsmen of their time. The first official competitions were organized in the 1920s and led to the world championship in the 1950s.

In 1915, Basque immigrants to southern Oregon constructed a fronton in Jordan Valley. In 1924, the United States built its first fronton in Miami. During the '80s and '90s, Jai-Alai was especially popular in Miami and Florida, but with the growth of casinos and legalized betting in the United States, the popularity of jai-alai evaporated, and only one non-amateur fronton is still known to exist in the country.

== Countries that play pelota ==
Pelota is played all over the Basque regions of south-western France and northern Spain, where it originated. There are also federations of Basque ball in Argentina, Bolivia, Brazil, Canada, Chile, Costa Rica, Cuba, the Dominican Republic, Ecuador, El Salvador, Guatemala, Greece, India, Italy, Mexico, the Netherlands, Paraguay, Peru, the Philippines, Sweden, the United States (including Puerto Rico), Uruguay and Venezuela. Due to the origin of the game, there are many good players who are Basques, either natives or from the Basque diaspora. The sport has been part of the Pan-American Games since 1995, but was dropped at the 1999, 2007 and 2015 editions due to its low popularity in Brazil and Canada.

=== Pelota in the Olympics ===
Basque pelota was an official Olympic sport once, in the 1900 Paris Games, and a demonstration sport in 1924 (men), 1968 (men) and 1992 (men and women). See also Basque pelota at the 1900 Summer Olympics.

In the 1900 Paris Games, there were two teams entered, France and Spain, but the French team, Maurice Durquetty and Etchegaray, withdrew on the afternoon of the contest; therefore, the contest was scratched and the Spanish team, Amezola and Villota, were awarded the gold medal.

== Playing area ==
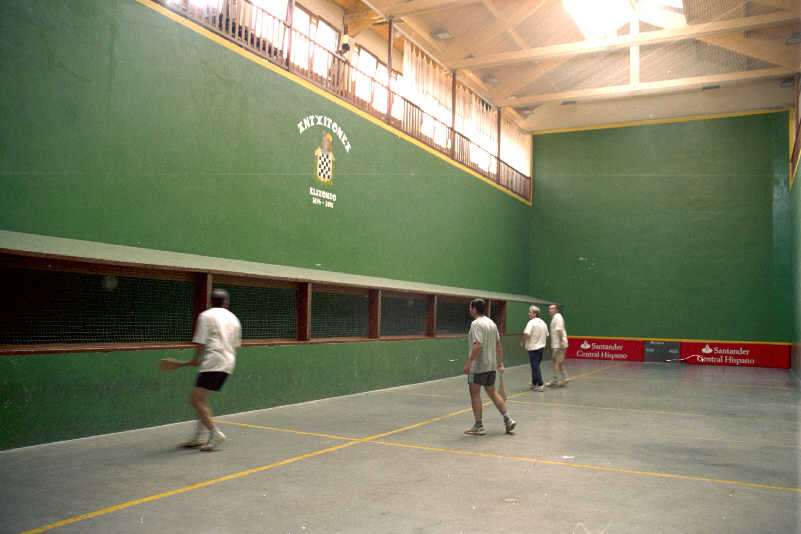
Playing paleta at the trinquet of Elizondo (Navarre)

Basque pelota is usually played in a two walled court (Basque: frontoi or pilotaleku, French: fronton, Spanish: frontón). As seen in the picture, there are also courts with one wall, a modality prevailing on the French side of the Basque Country, some spots of Navarre or at the highly exceptional court of Zubieta in province Gipuzkoa. Yet they are not recognized by the International Federation of Basque Pelota for international tournaments, and usually reserved to joko-garbia and open-air grand chistera games.

=== Trinquet ===
The trinquet is a court in Pelota where there is a front wall, a glass wall on the right and a wall on the left that has a dugout built into it and lastly a wall at the back. Where the right wall and the front wall meet there is small 45-degree wall. The trinquet is 8.50 meters high, 28.50 meters long and 9.30 meters wide.

=== Mur a Gauche ===
The mur a gauche is French for 'wall on the left' which it truly is, as represented in the diagram below where there is a front wall called a frontis, a left wall and a back wall called a rebot. The mur a gauche is 36 meters long, 10 meters wide and 10 meters high.

=== Jai-Alai ===
The Jai-Alai court has the same layout as the mur a gauche, but instead of being 36 meters long, it is 54 meters long.

== Rules (hand pilota) ==
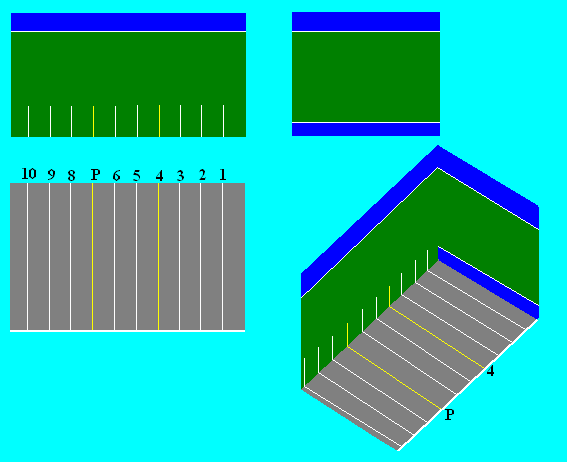
Basque pelota fronton diagram. Clockwise from top left: side wall; front wall; perspective view; ground.

The basic principle in hand-pelota is that there are two teams of two players each. The team to serve bounces the ball, then propels it towards the playing area of the narrow, front wall where it has to rebound between the low line demarcating the low off-area and the high line demarcating the high off-area.

The ball may either be played so it rebounds directly off the front wall onto the playing floor or onto the long side wall first. The opposing team may either play the ball immediately after rebounding from the front wall or side wall without rebounding from the playing floor or after having rebounded from the playing floor once.

A team scores by:

- playing the ball in such a way that the opposing team is unable to play the ball before it has rebounded off the playing floor more than once.
- playing the ball in such a way that it rebounds off the front wall and rebounds off the floor and outside the playing area.

A team may also score by the opposing team:

- hitting the front wall but either below the low line or above the high line.
- hitting the ball in time but failing to reach the front wall.

== Equipment ==
=== The ball ===
The ball used to play pelota is called pilota in Basque, pelote in French, and pelota in Spanish. There are different sizes, different weights and different materials for each discipline that is played.

The ball is made out of a boxwood core from 20–36 mm (0.79–1.42 in) in diameter. This is wrapped in a latex wire (for Hand Pelota, Grand Chistera, Jai-Alai, and open-air Pala). The core of the ball is different for individual age groups so that the weight limit is respected. The core can also be made from latex (for Cesta Punta, Xare, Pala Corta, and Remonte).

A wire of pure new wool is then carefully wrapped carefully around the core so that the ball is round and even throughout. A structure of cotton wire is sewed on the surface of the ball so that the wool stays in place. Number eight shapes are cut out from goat skin and are sewn together onto the ball in one or two layers.

=== The gloves (chistera) ===
Some of the disciplines in pelota require the use of a glove or Chistera.

Chistera Joko Garbi
A short and shallow glove that is used in Joko Garbi and is played on a fronton.
Grand Chistera
A long and deep glove. In France, the grand Chistera is used to play Grand Chistera on "place libre", and it is called Cesta Punta when it is played on a Jai-Alai.
Chistera de Remonte
It is only used in Spain for Remonte (played on a Jai-Alai court). It is a shallow glove like the Chistera Joko Garbi but longer.

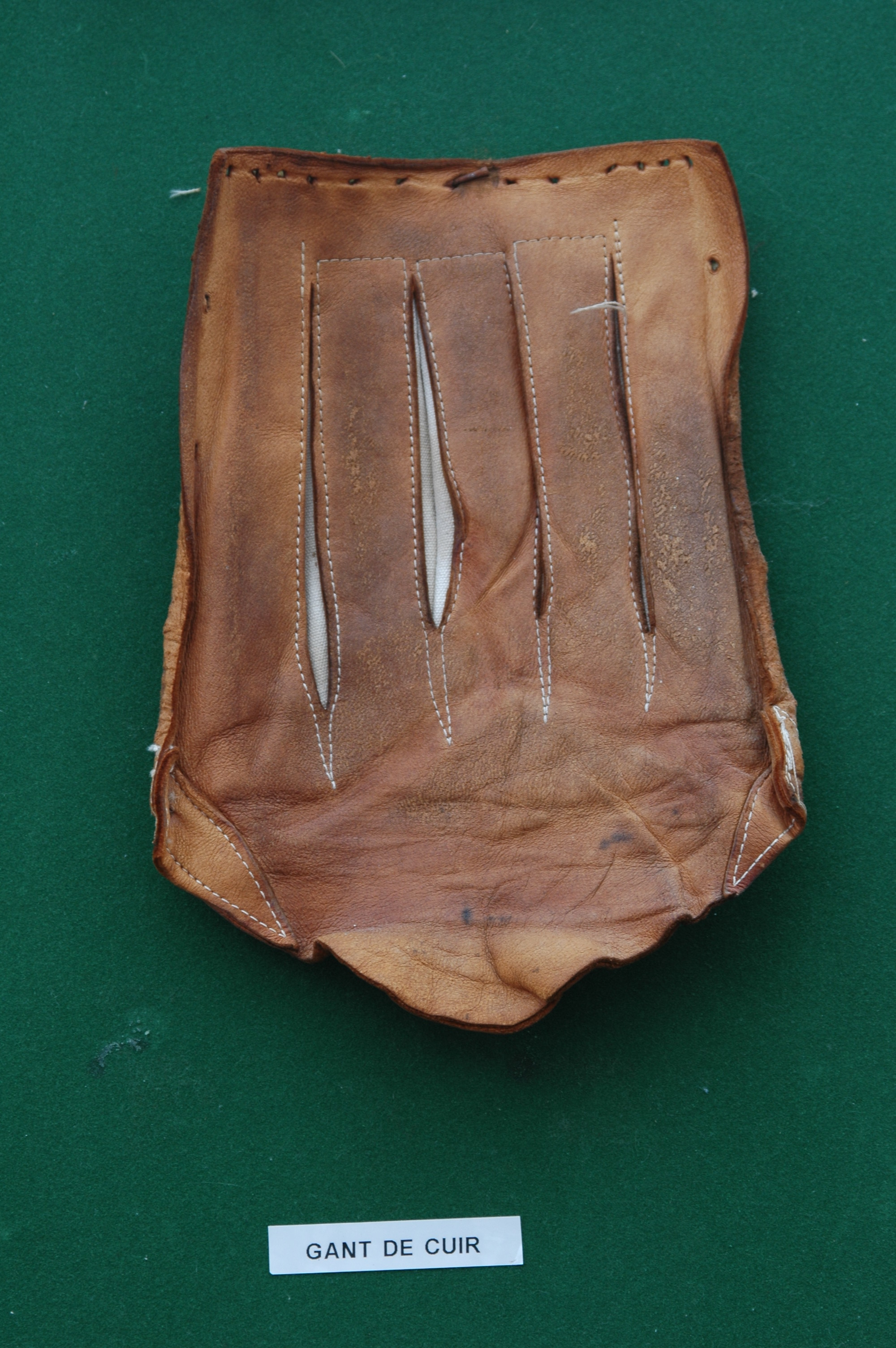
Short xistera.

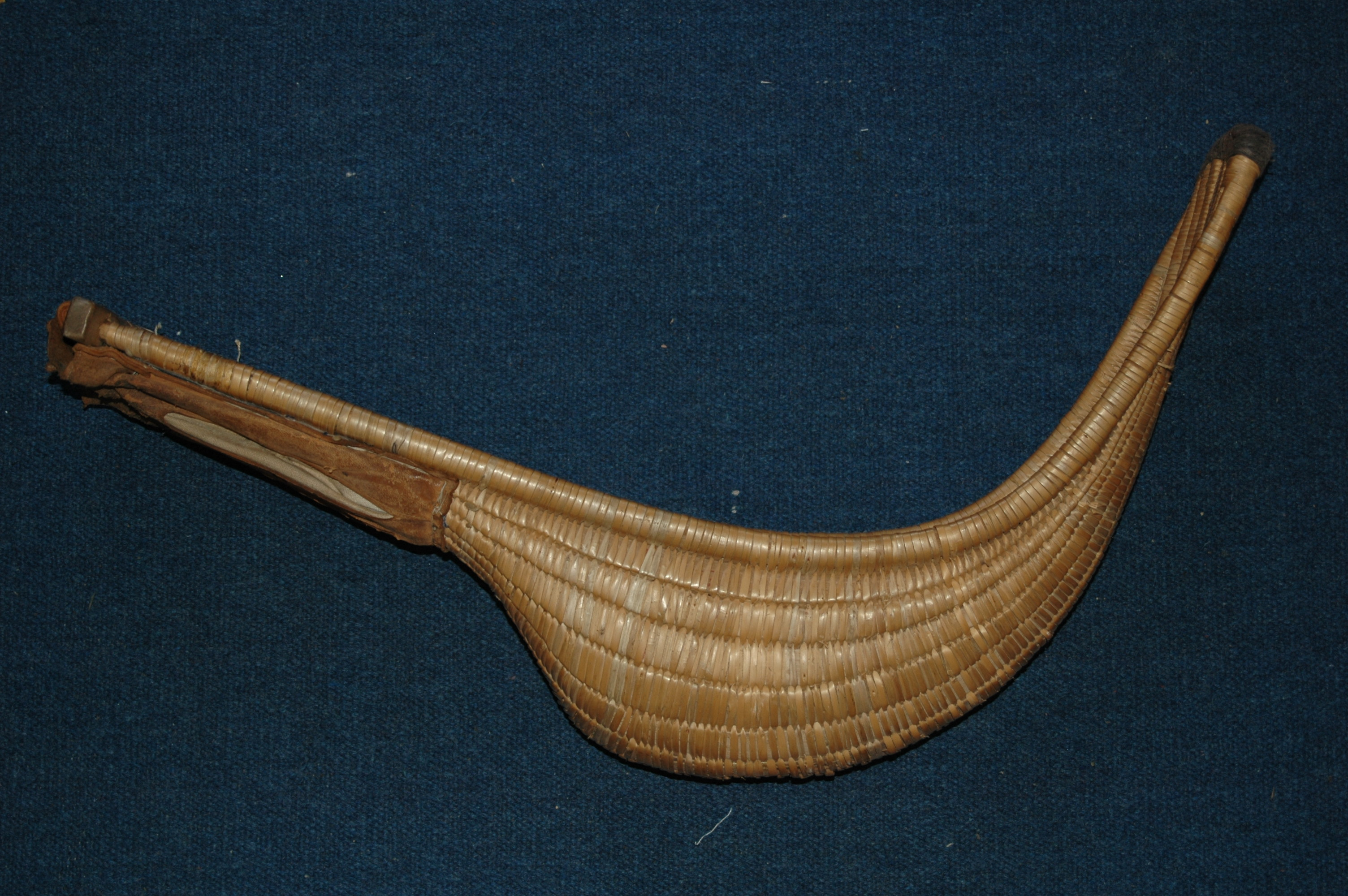
Long xistera.

=== The palas and paletas ===
The Palas and Paletas are wooden made rackets that are used to strike or hit the ball. The difference between them is their weight, length, and width.

Paleta Gomme Creuse-Paleta Goma
The larger of the two Paleta Gomme, it can weigh from 400 to 500 grams. It is used in the trinquet and on the mur a gauche.
Paleta Gomme Pleine-Pala Ancha
This Paleta is narrower but thicker than the Paleta Gomme creuse and is also 400 to 500 grams. It is used in the trinquet and the mur a gauche as well as the fronton 'place libre'.
Paleta Cuir-Paleta Cuero
This Paleta is thicker and narrower than both of the Paleta Gomme rackets and weighs from 500 to 600 grams. It is used in the trinquet, mur a gauche and fronton 'place libre'.
Grosse Pala-Pala Corta
A Pala that is even thicker and narrower than the Paleta Cuir, which results the Pala to be from 600 to 800 grams. The Pala is used in fronton 'place libre' and mur a gauche.
Pala Larga
Only used in Spain to play a game also called Pala Larga, it is the longest and heaviest of all the Palas and Paletas with a weight of 900 grams.

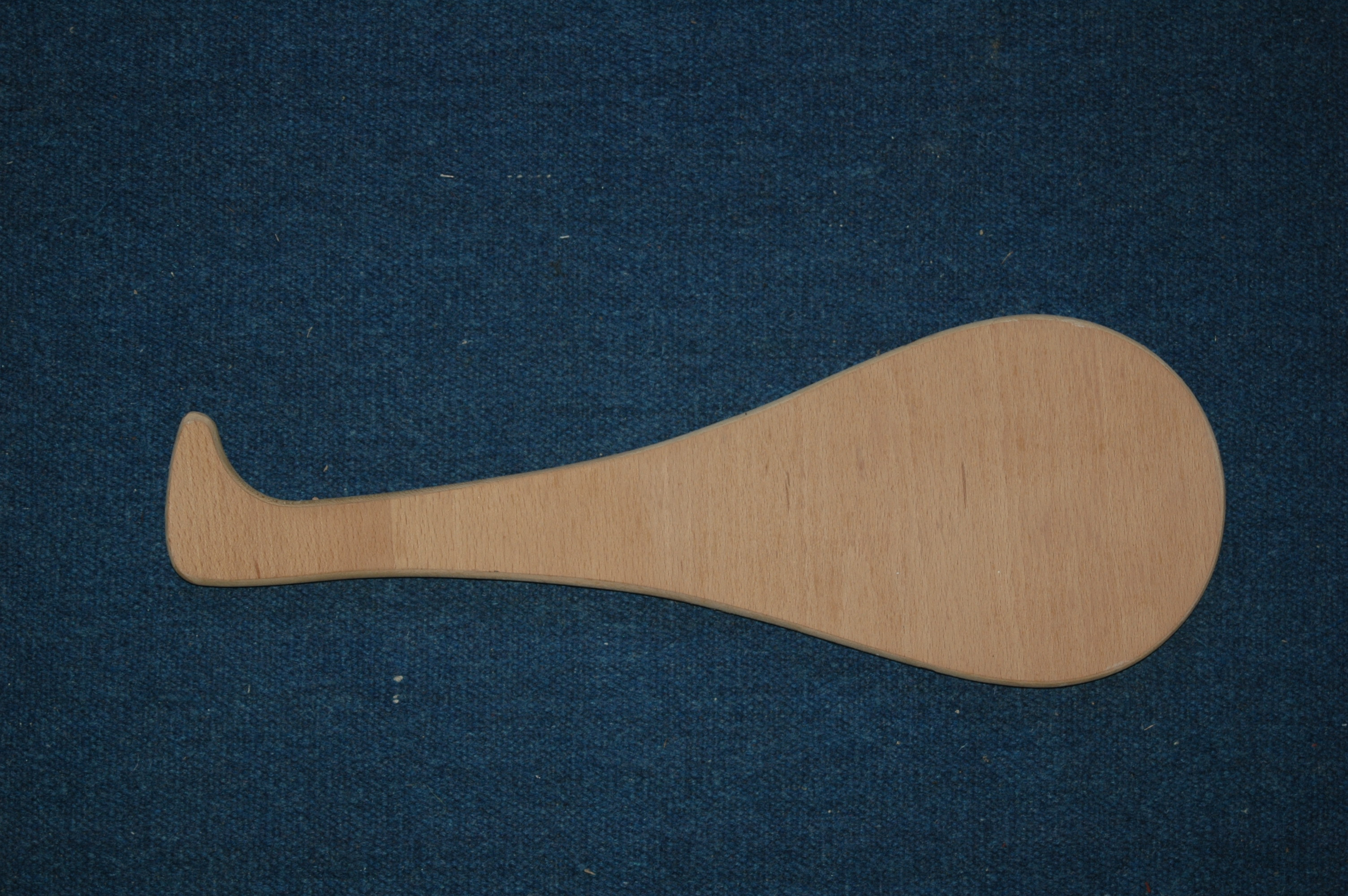
Paleta

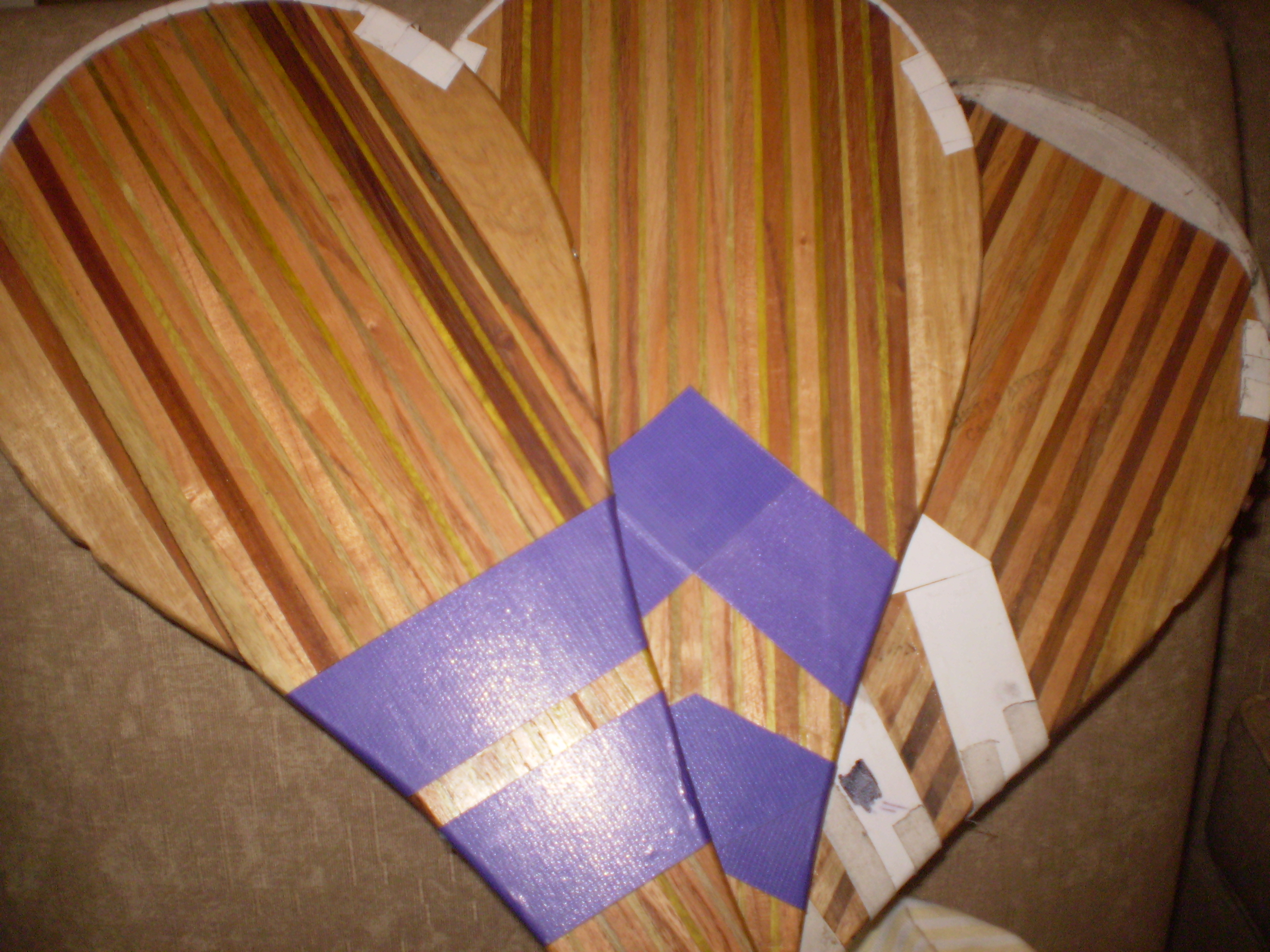
Argentine Multi-layered Wooden Paleta Goma.

== Variants ==
=== Jai alai ===
This is the version known outside Europe as jai alai. It is called zesta punta in Basque and cesta-punta in Spanish (literally: 'edged basket'). It uses a special glove that extends into a long pointed curved basket (hence the name), circa 60 cm long in straight line and 110 cm by curved line. The basket (xistera in Basque and chistera in French) was introduced by Gantchiqui Dithurbide from Saint-Pée, France in 1860, and its long version by Melchior Curuchage, from Buenos Aires in 1888. The players use it to catch the rubber ball and propel it back against the main court. The Basque Government claims it as "the fastest game on Earth", the record being 302 km/h or 187.65 mi/h (José Ramón Areitio at the Newport Jai Alai, Rhode Island, USA on 3 August 1979).

=== Frontenis ===
It is a modern Mexican fusion between tennis and Basque pelota. It uses tennis rackets in a short court, although the ball has a different surface to the tennis one. Men and women both play this game. It is played only in 30 meter courts.

=== Frontball ===
A single wall version played by hand, created in 2008 by FIPV.

=== Hand-pelota ===
Hand-pelota (Basque: esku huska or esku huskako pilota, Spanish: pelota a mano) is played barehanded (or with minimal protections) and with a traditional ball made of wool around a hard core and covered with leather. The standard ball should weigh 92–95 grams. It is played in the short court either individually (one vs. one) or by pairs (two vs. two). Traditionally and professionally it is reserved for men. Players can be distinguished by the swelling of their hitting hand. It was originally played in the 13th century in the Basque region of Spain and France, and has been played for a long time in Mexico, South America, Cuba, Italy and many US states, including Florida. The sport is similar to squash or fives, players hit the ball against the end wall, trying to get the ball out of the opponent's reach.

=== Paleta goma (rubber) ===
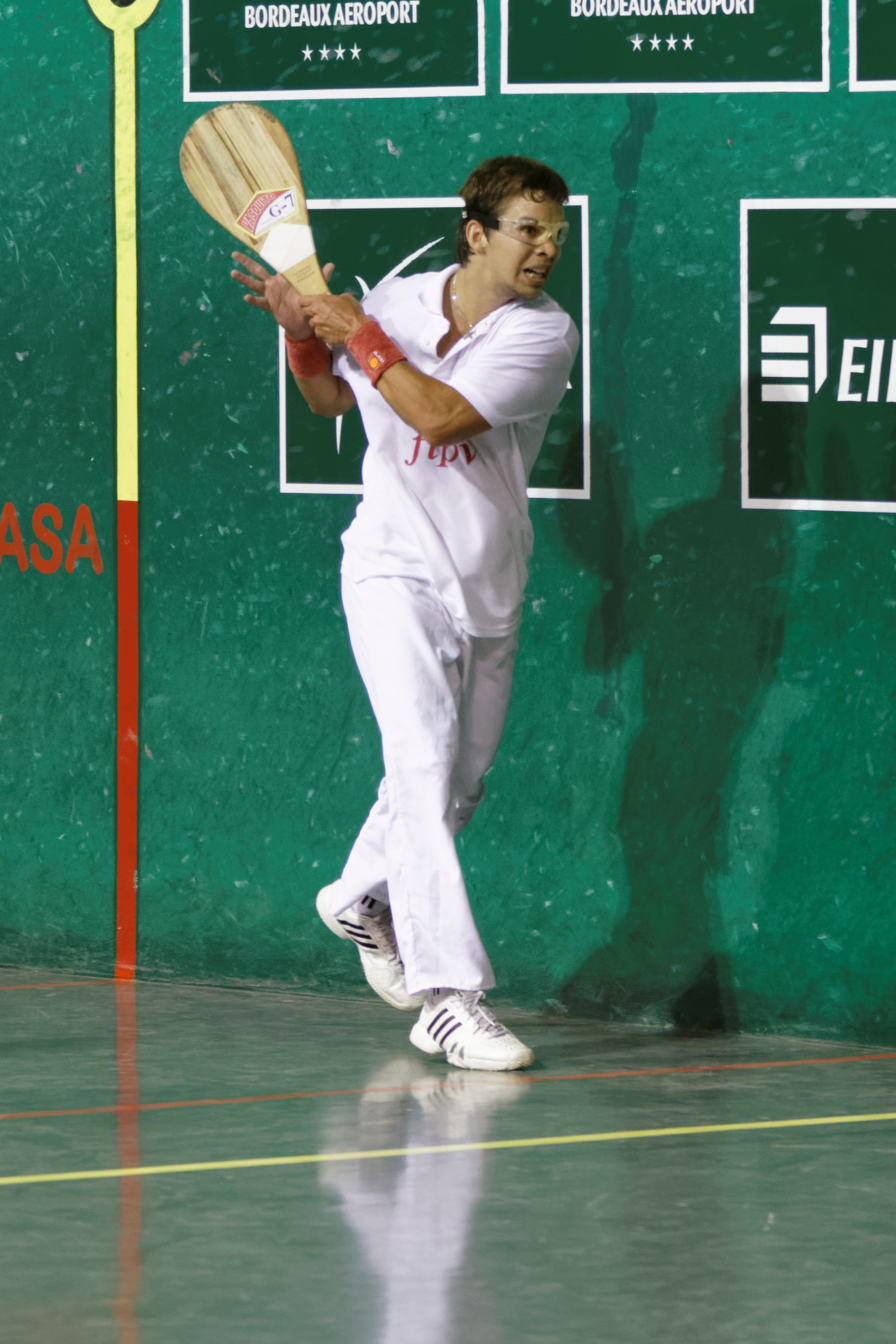
Paleta Gomme-Goma with a wooden racket

Also called "Argentine paleta goma", this is played with a short and broad wooden bat, called paleta in both Spanish and Basque, and a gas-filled rubber ball. The ball is neither solid nor hollow. It is made from two-halves glued together. Before being glued, the core is filled with a special gas which gives the ball firmness and bounce, and thus greater speed. Paleta goma can be played by either men or women. This version of paleta was invented in Argentina and is widely played there. The Argentine male pelotaris are used to dominating international competitions.

=== Paleta cuero (leather) ===
This variant is played with a bat similar to the previous one but with a traditional leather ball. This game is mainly played by men.

=== Pala corta (short bat) ===
This is played with somewhat shorter but thicker and much narrower bat (pala ancha). The ball is leather or rubber. It is reserved, in principle, for men.

=== Pala larga (long bat) ===
Is played with a longer bat (pala larga), again thick and not much wide. Leather or rubber ball in the long court. In principle, this game is reserved for men.

=== Grand Chistera ===
This version of the sport is played essentially in France by 2 teams of 3 players on an outside court referred to as place libre, meaning "free space" in French, or Cancha, meaning "court" in Spanish. The court is 16 m wide and 100 m long with the limit for play being at 80 m from the wall or Fronton and has no side walls. The sport is played with the same glove as the zesta punta.

=== Joko-garbi ===
A variant of the above. The basket-glove is shorter and less deep and it is allowed to retain the ball only momentarily. The Basque name joko garbi means "pure game", in opposition to the abuse of atxiki (unfair retention of the ball), typical of the late 19th century style of playing, dubbed joko zikin ("dirty game").

This game is for men only.

=== Remonte ===
Similar to joko-garbi, but the xistera is flatter and doesn't allow the atchiki foul. It can be played by individuals or teams of two players. This game is still performed by professionals in several Jai-Alai frontons in northern Spain.

=== Xare ===
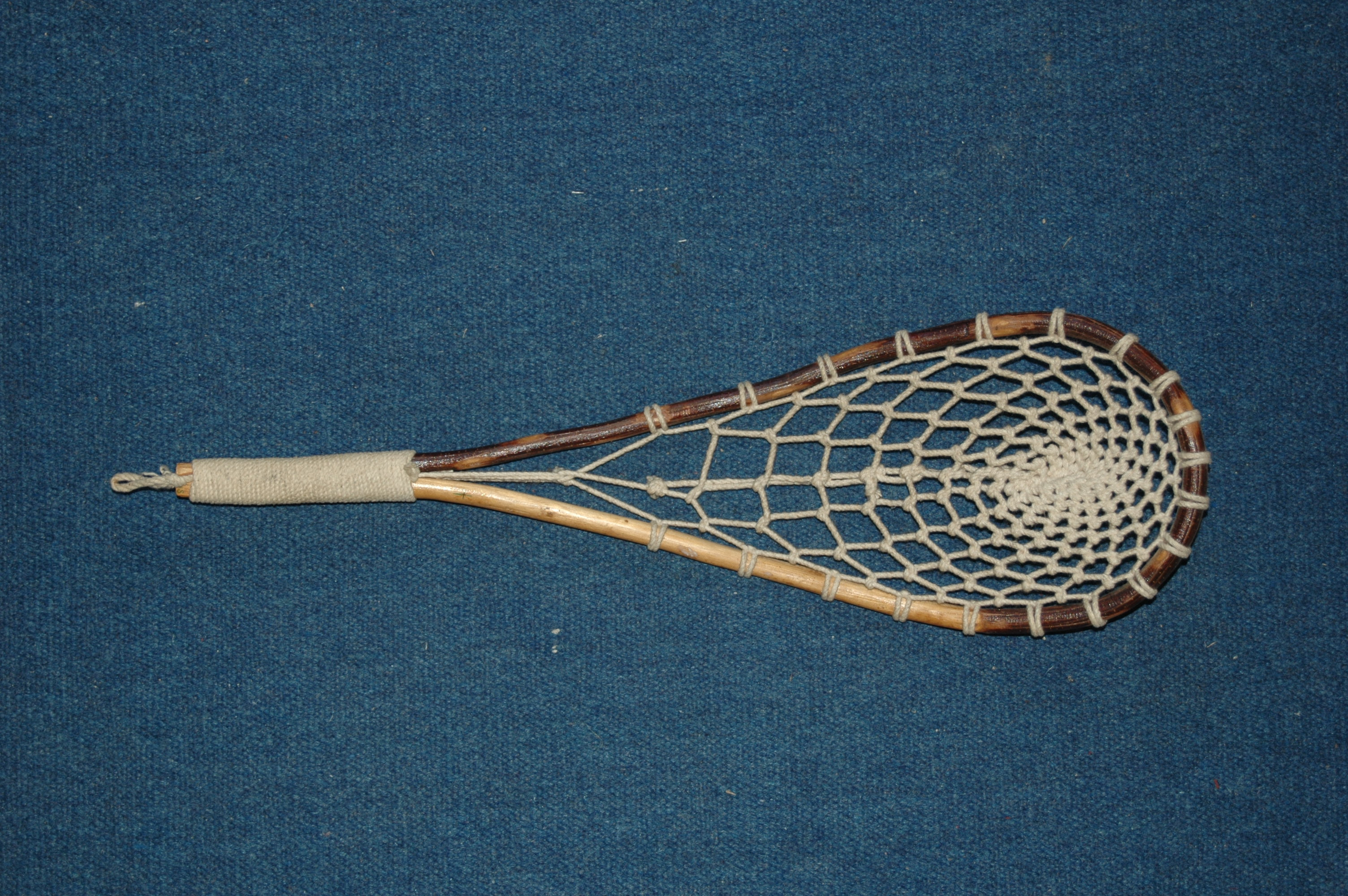
Xare

Xare or sare (from name of the racket, which means "net" in Basque; also spelled share in Spanish) is played with a wooden ring strung with a net, meaning that the ball is thrown instead of hit. It is played only on the trinquet court. Xare is known for the quick, precise and sharp movements of the pelotaris who are capable of reaching balls considered impossible for pelotaris of other specialties. Bicycle-like helmets are also worn. It is traditionally strong in South American countries, especially Argentina, as a result of which it is also known as raqueta argentina and raquette argentine in Spanish and French.

=== Paleta frontón ===
Paleta frontón is a Peruvian variant. The sport is similar to squash but is played on an open court, with a wooden, carbon fiber or glass fiber paddle and a black rubber ball.

== Professionalism in pelota ==
Professional competitions and exhibitions in the Basque Country are organized by Asegarce and ASPE for the discipline of handball, Orriamendi for Remonte, Inpala for Pala Larga. Various tournaments exist for Cesta Punta professional players in France and Spain.

In the United States pelota was mainly a professional sport, strongly tied to betting and the pari-mutuel system.

In professional environment is common to play special plays called "quinielas" well adapted to the betting needs.

=== Main tournaments ===
- 1st Hand-pelota, singles category
- 1st Hand-pelota, doubles category
- Cuatro y Medio
- 2nd Hand-pelota, singles category

In 1994, the production company Asegarce started painting the courts green so that the ball would be more visible on TV.

== Renowned players ==
=== Active ===
- Oinatz Bengoetxea
- Olaizola II

=== Retired ===
- Atano III
- Beloki
- Martínez de Irujo
- Retegi II
- Titín III
- Txikito de Iraeta
- Txikito de Eibar

Professional games are open to betting on the results, as usual in most traditional Basque competitions. In the US and Macau it is mainly this aspect of the competition that has given it some popularity. Besides the federations, there are professional competitions such as the League of Companies of Basque Pilota. The International Jai-Alai Players Association is a union defending the players of Jai Alai.

== Basque Pelota World Championships ==
The International Federation of Basque Pelota has organized the Basque Pelota World Championships since 1952.

=== Medal table ===
The current medal table from 1952 to 2018 is as follows:

Medals in international basque pelota tournaments
Rank	Nation	Gold (Note: This table includes all modalities, including those being played in Plaza Libre in 1952 and 1958.)	Silver	Bronze (Note: No bronze medals were disputed from 1952 to 1966.)	Total
1	Spain	69	75	39	183
2	France	68	65	44	177
3	Mexico	50	41	32	123
4	Argentina	48	25	18	91
5	Uruguay	4	30	15	49
6	Cuba	3	5	16	24
7	United States	0	1	2	3
8	Chile	0	0	6	6

== Dictionary (basic) ==
- Jo! (Basque pronunciation: [xo]): game is on!
- Ba!: game is on!
- Sakea: the stroke that puts the ball in play
- Ona: good, valid
- Falta: foul
- Berriz: repeat
- Errebote: rebound on rear wall
- Atxiki (Basque pronunciation: [atʃiki]): illegal retain
- Bote, punpa: bounce
- Ados: tie, draw

== In popular culture ==
- A statue commemorating the game skills used for throwing grenades by Victor Iturria during the Second World War was erected in Sare.
- Films and television programmes that show pelota being played include:
  - Mexican film The Night Falls, released in 1952, starring Pedro Armendariz as a pelota champion with ties to Mexico City's underworld
  - Philip Leacock's 1956 film, The Spanish Gardener
  - The Russell Rouse's Western film Thunder in the Sun
  - In Sergio Corbucci's 1978 Italian film Odds and Evens (Pari e dispari), starring Terence Hill and Bud Spencer, who eventually wins a Basque pelota tournament.
  - The Simpsons (Lenny, Homer's friend, is shown to live in a pelota playground, and Mr Burns wins a match after a blood transfusion)
  - The Basque Ball (Spanish documentary film about Basque politics that uses pelota as a metaphor)
  - Jørgen Leth's documentary "Pelota".
  - Miami Vice (Jai-alai pelota)
  - In Mad Men episode "The Arrangements", Pete Campbell brings in a client who wants to promote Jai-Alai in the US.
  - Benidorm - In Series 7, Episode4, Glynn takes Jacqueline to a sports centre to play pelota but have to watch as there is a league game on that day. Due to an injury, Glynn steps in as a substitute, only for Jacqueline to take his place when he shows he is not a good player.
  - Around the World with Orson Welles episode 2 "Pays Basque II (La Pelote basque)"
  - Robert Mandel's 1996 film, The Substitute
  - The Expanse S2E3 "Static" - Camina and Naomi play a traditional Belter sport that is very similar to pelota.
  - Las pelotaris 1926, a 2023 Mexican series, is set in the world of female pelota.
  - Dungeon Crawler Carl, Carl's Earth hobby is jai alai

== See also ==
- Basque rural sports
- Squash (sport)
- One wall handball, a compromise rules sport among folk games.

Other modalities

- Gaelic handball
- Pêl-Law (Welsh handball)
- Valencian pilota
  - Valencian frontó
