= Iturria =

Iturria is a Basque surname, meaning "Fountain". Notable people with the surname include:

- Arthur Iturria (born 1994), French rugby union player
- Asier Peña Iturria
- Mikel Iturria (born 1992), Spanish cyclist
- Victor Iturria (1914–1944), French paratrooper
