= Jean le Fèvre (poet) =

French poet and translator (14th century)

Jean Le Fèvre de Ressons
- Born: c. 1320; Ressons-sur-Matz, Oise, France
- Died: after 1380
- Occupations: Procureur at the Parlement of Paris; poet; translator
- Writing career
- Language: Old French
- Notable works: Le Respit de la mort Le Livre de Leesce; Les Lamentations de Matheolus (French translation)

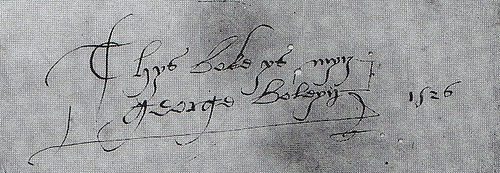
Inscription by George Boleyn (1526) in a copy containing Les Lamentations de Matheolus and Le Livre de Leesce attributed to Jean Le Fèvre.

Jean Le Fèvre de Ressons (also spelled Jehan Le Febvre; c. 1320 – after 1380) was a French poet and translator active in the later fourteenth century. A procureur associated with the Parlement of Paris, he produced a substantial body of verse and translations from Latin into Old French, including influential vernacular versions of the Lamentationes Matheoluli (often known in French as Les Lamentations de Matheolus) and a pro-woman reply, Le Livre de Leesce (also called the Book of Gladness), a notable contribution to medieval debates about marriage and women.

== Life and career ==
Le Fèvre was born at Ressons-sur-Matz (in the modern département of Oise). He is attested as a procureur connected to the Parlement of Paris, with surviving documentary traces of his activity in the second half of the fourteenth century. He suffered a serious illness in 1376, an event closely associated with the composition of his poem Le Respit de la mort, and he is known to have been alive in 1380; his later life and date of death are uncertain.

== Works ==
Le Fèvre wrote both original verse and translations. Modern scholarship frequently treats him primarily as a translator, while also recognizing the distinctiveness of his original poem Le Respit de la mort and the literary importance of Le Livre de Leesce as a sustained rebuttal to misogynistic argumentation in medieval tradition.

=== Translations ===
Le Fèvre translated several Latin texts into Old French, including:

- the Disticha Catonis (Distiques de Caton)
- the Ecloga Theoduli (often titled Le Theodolet in French tradition)
- the pseudo-Ovidian De vetula (often circulating in French as La Vieille)
- the Lamentationes Matheoluli of Matheolus (Les Lamentations de Matheolus)
- a collection of liturgical hymns

His French Lamentations played a major role in transmitting the Latin poem's themes and arguments to later medieval readers, and became an important point of reference within the broader European “woman question” (later framed as the querelle des femmes).

=== Original verse ===
Le Fèvre's two principal original poems are:

- Le Respit de la mort (c. 1376), framed through a legal fiction that draws on contemporary procedure and the notion of a “letter of respite,” composed in connection with the author's recovery from serious illness.
- Le Livre de Leesce (written between 1373 and 1387 according to later summaries), a systematic rebuttal to the antifeminine satire associated with Matheolus, often described as a palinode-like retraction and counterargument to the misogynistic case developed in the Lamentations tradition.

Le Livre de Leesce is also associated with the early development of the motif of the Neuf Preuses (Nine Worthy Women), presented as female counterparts to the Nine Worthies in late medieval chivalric culture.

== Reception and influence ==
Le Fèvre's French translation of Matheolus’ Lamentationes was a key vehicle for the later prominence of the text and the arguments it circulated about women and marriage. His subsequent Livre de Leesce reframed that material as a pro-woman response, and later writers drew on or adapted this tradition of rebuttal in major works of late medieval pro-feminine polemic, including Christine de Pizan’s Book of the City of Ladies.

== Editions ==
- Jean Le Fèvre de Ressons (1969). Hasenohr-Esnos, Geneviève (ed.). Le Respit de la mort. A. & J. Picard (Société des anciens textes français).
- Van Hamel, A.-G., ed. (1892). Les Lamentations de Matheolus et Le Livre de Leesce de Jehan Le Fèvre, de Resson (poèmes français du XIVe siècle). Paris: Émile Bouillon.

== See also ==
- Neuf Preux
