= List of works by Maxime Real del Sarte =

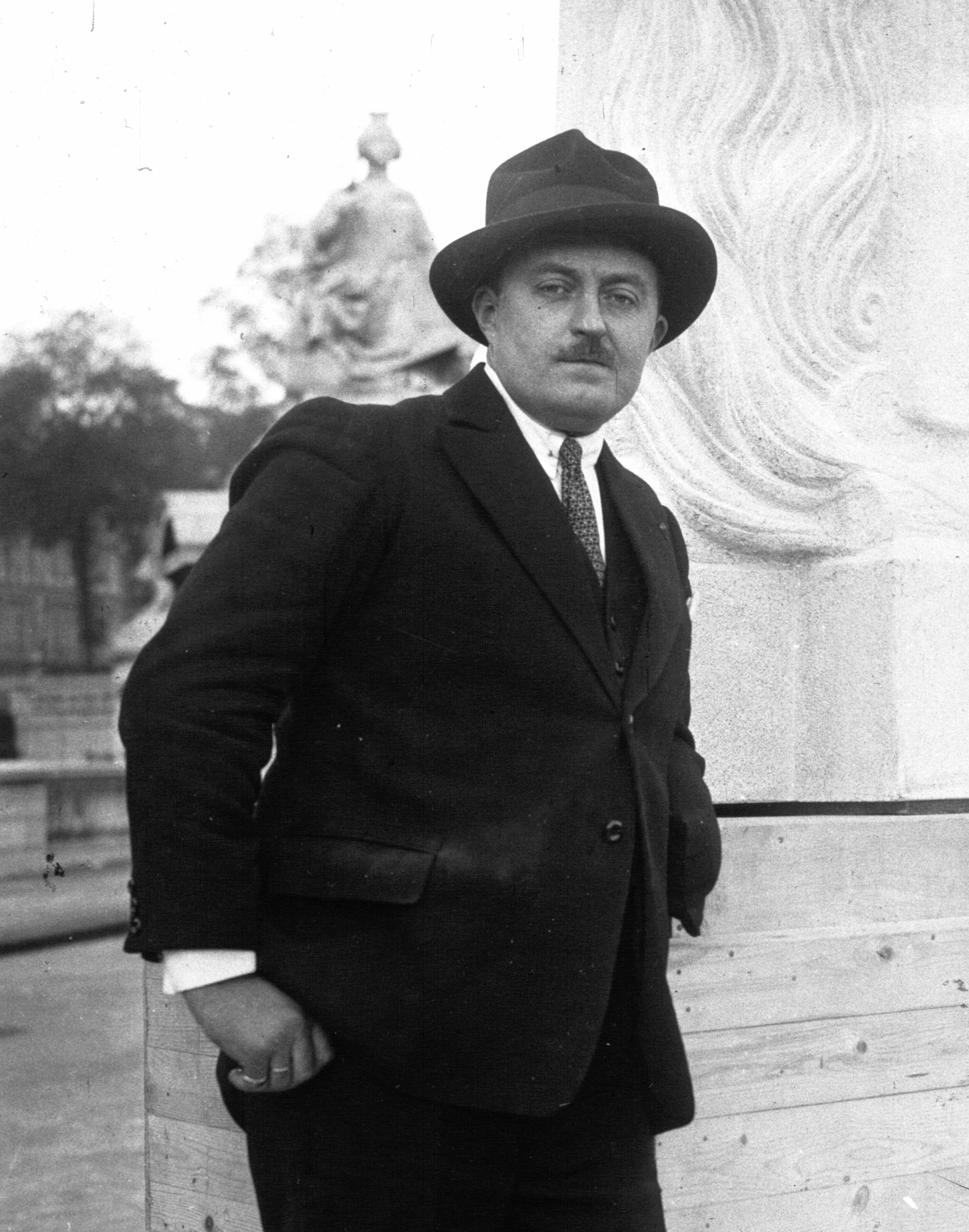
Real del Sarte in 1928

This article is a list of public sculptures designed by Maxime Real del Sarte.

== War Memorials using the composition entitled "Je t'ai cherché" ==
The plaster model entitled "Je t'ai cherché" was first exhibited in 1920 at the Salon des Artistes Français under reference number 3396, and the composition was used by Real del Sarte for five war memorials. These are listed below.

"Je t'ai cherché" translates as "I looked/searched for you". Sarte works the compositions beautifully and there are connotations of Mary covering Jesus' body with a shroud or winding sheet.

Name of sculpture	Location of sculpture	Date work executed	Notes
The war memorial at Ressons-sur-Matz in the Oise	Ressons-sur-Matz	1924	Those responsible for the Ressons-sur-Matz war memorial and also for the war memorials at Cérisy-la-Salle in Manche, Saint-Chély-d'Apcher in Lozère, Sare in Pyrénées-Atlantiques, and that at Le Tréport in Seine-Maritime all chose the "Je t'ai cherché" piece as the central feature of their memorials. In Sarte's composition a grieving woman leans over the body of a soldier as she wraps it in a "linceul" (shroud or winding sheet. In French suaire ou drap mortuaire)) over him. The woman could be the soldier's wife, his mother or his sister who has been searching for, and now found, the corpse of a loved one and in covering him with a shroud, Sartre, a devout catholic, reminds us of the action of Mary and her covering the body of Christ with a shroud. The woman represents the French Republic in mourning. It was said that the soldier's likeness was based on that of Charles Eudes, one of Maxime Real del Sarte's comrades at the front. Real del Sarte was recommended for the Ressons-sur-Matz war memorial by the writer Binet-Valmer who had taken part in the liberation of the village in 1918. The war memorial at Ressons-sur-Matz was completed in 1924, with the inauguration taking place on 6 April of that year.
The war memorial at Cérisy-la-Salle in the Manche	Cérisy-la-Salle		As stated above, the Ressons-sur-Matz composition was used for the Cérisy-la-Salle war memorial which stands in front of the Cérisy-la-Salle parish church, the Église Saint-Pierre-et-Saint-Paul at 1, rue des Ecoles. It remembers the 105 men of the parish who died in the 1914-1918 war
The war memorial at Saint-Chély-d'Apcher in Lozère	Saint-Chély-d'Apcher		Again Sarte's ""je t'ai cherché"" composition is used, this time for the Saint-Chély-d'Apcher war memorial in Lozère. The memorial stands in the Place du Foirail The memorial was inaugurated on 24 September 1922
The war memorial at Sare in the Pyrénées-Atlantiques	Sare		Again the ""je t'ai cherché"" composition is used. The memorial stands by the church of Saint Martin in Sare and remembers the 41 men of Sare who gave their lives in the two World Wars.
The Le Tréport war memorial	Le Tréport		The fifth memorial to use the ""je t'ai cherché"" composition is at Le Tréport in Seine-et-Maritime

== War memorials using the composition "Terre de France" ==
Name of sculpture	Location of sculpture	Date work executed	Notes
The war memorial in Sceaux in Hauts-de-Seine	Sceaux		The Sceaux war memorial involves a Real del Sarte composition called "Terre de France". This work was first shown at the 1919 exhibition of the Société des Artistes Français. It was in plaster and was shown under reference 1211. Then at the 1920 exhibition a limestone version was shown, this under catalogue number 3395. It was this limestone work that was used for the Saint-Jean-de-Luz (Pyrénées-Atlantiques) war memorial (see later entry). When the Sceaux municipality organised a competition for the design of their war memorial in April 1920, the participating artists were limited to those living in Sceaux but no suitable candidates came forward and in June 1920, the organising committee put forward the idea of using the "Terre de France" work seen at the Salon. Their recommendation was accepted but for their "Terre de France" to be cast in bronze. There is incidentally a third version of this composition in existence and that is for the war memorial in Stavelot in Belgium, there the figure being cast in bronze and on a limestone base.
The war memorial in Saint-Jean-de-Luz in Pyrénées-Atlantiques	Saint-Jean-de-Luz		As stated above, the memorial here is the limestone version of "Terre de France". It was to Saint-Jean-de-Luz that Real del Sarte retired and where he died. He was to create a beautiful "Stations of the Cross" for the parish church there. See later entry.
The war memorial in Stavelot in Belgium	Stavelot		Part of this memorial is the composition "Terre de France"

== Other war memorials ==
Name of sculpture	Location of sculpture	Date work executed	Notes
The war memorial in Laventie in Pas-de-Calais	Laventie		This memorial is located in front of Laventie's parish church. In Real del Sarte's composition a woman holds a dying soldier in her arms. The woman represents France.
The war memorial at Sommières-du-Clain in Vienne	Sommières-du-Clain		On one side the memorial lists the names of those remembered and on the other side there is a bas-relief by Real del Sarte. The theme of Sarte's composition was suggested by a member of the Vareilles-Sommières family. It shows a haloed Joan of Arc, wearing a breast plate and a tunic embroidered with the fleur de lys. She wears a sword in her sword belt and holds a crown of laurel leaves in her right hand. She is comforting a dying soldier who is wrapped in a flag. Joan points with her other hand to the sky and to heaven and is perhaps telling the soldier that he will soon be in heaven. Strasbourg Cathedral figures in the right hand corner of the relief. The war memorial at Briey in Meurthe-et-Moselle uses the same relief but this was in bronze. That at Sommières-du-Clain is in limestone.
War memorial at Jemappes in Algeria	Jemappes		
The Rouen War Memorial	Rouen		This enormous monument, known as "Le Monument de la Victoire" was first erected in the place Foch in Rouen but was moved to the place Carnot when the metro station "Palais de Justice" was constructed. The monument comprises a tall column surmounted by the winged Angel of Victory. On one side of the base of the column, Real del Sarte carves a representation of Joan of Arc whose arms are spread to protect a widow and an orphan and on another side, two soldiers stand guard. The face of the soldier on the left was a likeness of Charles Maurras the leader of the right wing movement "Action Française" of which Real del Sarte was an active member. At the time the monument was erected Joan of Arc had just been canonized and Action Française were a major force in French politics. Controversy has stalked the memorial and during one political demonstration which took place around it, Maurras' head was knocked off. There are also bas-reliefs at the base of the monument which celebrates the refuge given by Normandy to refugees from Belgium during the 1914-1918 war.
Monument aux morts des Forains	Rouen		This monument is also located in Rouen and is dedicated to all those French market traders who laid down their lives in the 1914-1918 war. A committee was set up to organise the monument's erection. The committee tried to get the mayors of Paris and Neuilly to permit this monument to be erected in their areas and it was finally Rouen which was chosen by the committee, this because of the importance of Rouen's yearly fair of St Romain, this one of France's largest markets. This would allow the market traders to hold a reunion when that market was held from end of October to the middle of November. On 27 November 1930, Rouen agreed to the monument's erection and it was erected in the place de Boulingrin. Maxime Real del Sarte was chosen as the sculptor. Four columns form a horse shoe shaped backdrop and in the centre are two lions pulling a chariot ridden by a winged angel who holds a crown of laurel in her right arm whilst she comforts a dying soldier with her left arm. During a bombing raid on Rouen on 17 August 1942, a bomb damaged the lions but they were subsequently restored.
The Monument Marie-Louise et des Bleuets at the Ferme de Hurtebrise	Ferme de Hurtebrise		The monument at Ferme de Hurtebrise The "Ferme d'Hurtebise" is situated in Bouconville-Vauclair on the Chemin des Dames near to Craonne. It was here that the Battle of Craonne took place on 7 March 1814 when Napoleon's army fought the combined armies of Russia and Prussia and 100 years later the same location saw bitter fighting between France and Germany, as part of the struggle to take or hold the Chemin des Dames ridge which took place throughout the 1914-1918 war and was to cost so many lives. It had been in March 1914 that a monument had been erected facing the farm in memory of the Battle of Craonne, this on the occasion of the battle's 100th anniversary. It comprised an obelisk surmounted by a star and was called the "memorial of Marie-Louise and the Grognards", this in reference to the young conscripts of Napoleon's army known as the " Marie-Louse" and the soldiers of the old guard known as "Grognards". This monument was destroyed in September 1914 in the course of the early battles of the 1914-1918 war. The Hurtebrise site was of great strategic importance because of its height and the views it enjoyed of the surrounding area and the German army dug in there in the autumn of 1914. Thereafter there was frequent fighting to take or hold on to the area, but Hurtebrise, lying between the Caverne du dragon and the Plateau de Californie stayed for the most part in German hands until 1918. In 1927 a second monument was erected on the site of that destroyed in 1914. This was called the "monument of Marie-Louise et des Bleuets" and Real del Sarte now created two figures in bronze, one a soldier in the uniform of 1814 and another a poilu of 1914–1918. They stand on either side of a furled flag and both hold crowns of laurel which they reach up to place at the top of the flagpole. The monument was inaugurated on 30 October 1927.
The war memorial of Ascain in Pyrénées-Atlantiques	Ascain	1924	This war memorial dates to 1924 and features a sculpture by Real del Sarte. The memorial remembers the 61 Ascain men who laid down their lives in the two World Wars. In Real del Sarte's composition a man stands in front of a grave and a young woman kneels at his side. A helmet hangs from the cross marking the grave. As is often the case, Sarte adds sheaves of corn to suggest regeneration to counterbalance the great feeling of loss which the central image engenders. To add a touch of local colour, Sarte's man wears the high-waisted shirt of the Basque country.
The war memorial at Guéthary	Guéthary		Real del Sarte's bronze sits on a large rectangular pedestal. The composition involves a dying soldier being supported by a winged Angel of Victory.
The war memorial in Mulhouse in Haut-Rhin Alsace	Mulhouse		The Mulhouse War Memorial consists of an obelisk which stands in the avenue du Président Roosevelt, and was inaugurated in 1927. In front on the obelisk is a standing figure which was carved by Real del Sarte. It was partially destroyed in 1942 but was restored in 1954. The griffons which formed part of the original memorial were moved to the local zoo. The original sculptural work on the memorial was by Real del Sarte and in the restoration François Cacheux replaced Real del Sarte's work that had been destroyed. Some information on the two dragons is given here. They are remarkable sculptures,
The war memorial at Langogne in Lozère in Languedoc-Roussillon	Lozère		The Langogne war memorial stands in the Place de la Halle and features a dying soldier wrapped in the French national flag who is being comforted by Joan of Arc. She wears a medieval helmet and a tunic embellished with the fleur de lys. She has a sword at her side. She helps him to prepare for death and points to the sky as if to assure the dying man that he will soon be in heaven. The names of the dead of both the 1914–1918 and 1939–1945 conflicts are listed on the face of the memorial's pedestal. The foundry who did the bronze casting was Montagutelli frères and the memorial dates to 1922.
The war memorial of La Grand-Combe in Gard in Languedoc-Roussillon	La Grand-Combe		The La Grand-Combe war memorial in the Place Jean-Jaurès features a dead soldier wrapped in the French flag whose body lies near the bottom of the memorial's pedestal whilst above him and on the top of the pedestal there is a winged Angel of Victory who leans forward to offer the soldier a crown. A group of men, women and children shelter beneath the Angel of Victory's wings. These people are said to represent the mining community of La Grand-Combe. The face of the pedestal bears the inscriptions "1914 1918 souvenez vous 1939 1945" » and "la victoire du droit"
The war memorial at Ganges in Hérault in Languedoc-Roussillon	Ganges		This war memorial in Ganges in Hérault in Languedoc-Roussillon remembers the dead of the 1914–1918 war. Del Sarte's composition features a woman and a young boy and a cross, grave and helmet as well as a vine. The inscription reads "GANGES A SES MORTS 1914 1918" with the names listed of the men remembered. On the cross is the inscription "MORT POUR LA FRANCE". The memorial was completed in 1935. In Sarte's composition a widow stands with her son in front of the grave of her husband. They carry a wreath to lay on the grave and hold hands in their shared grief. An adrian helmet hangs from the cross, Satre balances the sadness of the two figures by including bunches of grapes and a grape vine, thus symbolizing regeneration. The statue was vandalised but has been fully restored.
The war memorial at Viviers in Ardèche, Rhône-Alpes	Viviers		The Real del Sarte composition here features a bronze statue of a woman who represents victory. The memorial stands in the Place de l'Esplanade. The inscription reads " "VIVIERS A SES ENFANTS MORTS POUR LA PATRIE".

== Bust of Joan of Arc in the Basilique-Jeanne-d'Arc in Paris ==
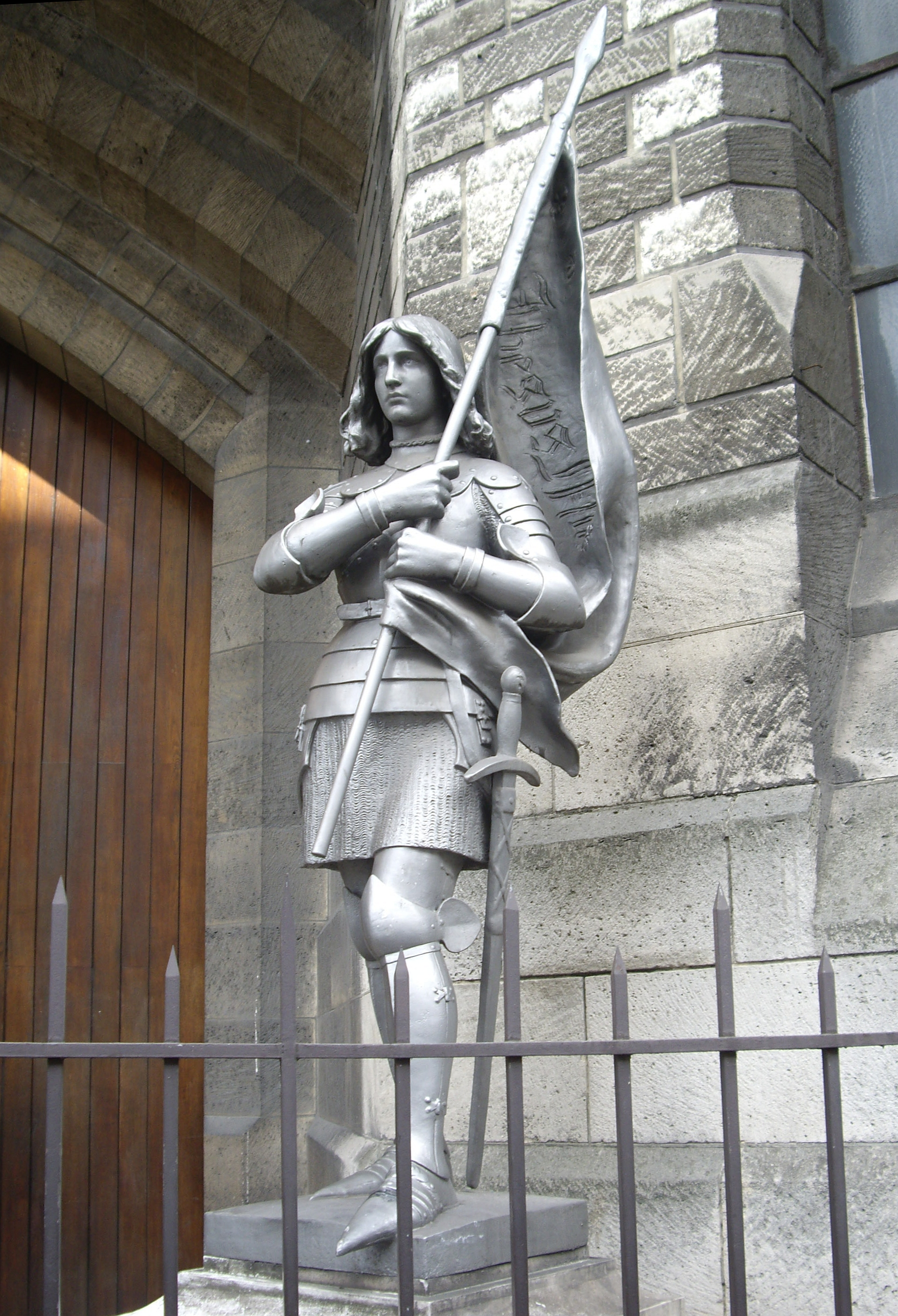
Charpentier's statue of Joan of Arc outside the Basilique Sainte-Jeanne-d'Arc

Construction of this Basilique in honour of Joan of Arc was finished in 1964. Apart from a bust of Joan of Arc by Real del Sarte inside the church, there is a statue of Joan of Arc outside the church by Félix Charpentier The site of the church was chosen specifically as it is next to the church of Saint-Denys de la Chapelle where Joan of Arc was greeted in 1429.

== Statue of Joan of Arc in Rouen ==
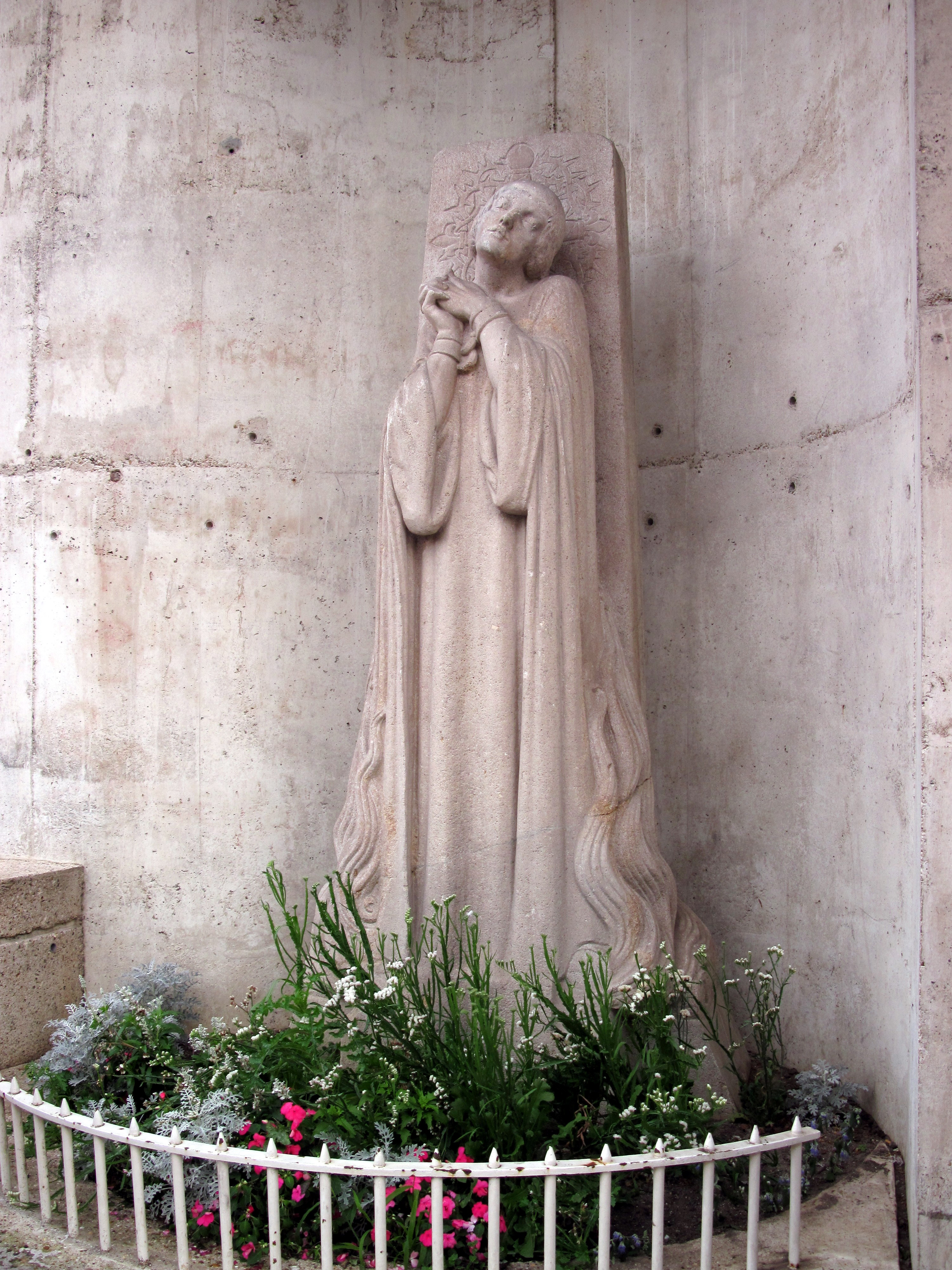
Joan of Arc in Rouen. Statue by Maxime Real del Sarte. Joan is burnt at the stake and we see the flames already catching the bottom of her robe. The statue is known as "Jeanne au bûcher"

Perhaps the best known of Real del Sarte's sculptures of Joan of Arc, this stands in the place du Vieux-Marché by the Église Sainte-Jeanne-d'Arc in Rouen. The work was completed in 1929. The church is relatively new having been constructed as part of the re-development of the area. The church was designed by Louis Arretche, and was finally consecrated on 29 April 1975. Real del Satre's work shows Joan at the stake with the flames starting to catch the bottom of her robe. The work is known as "Jeanne au bûcher" and there are copies of it in other locations in France and in Montréal and Buenos Aires. See later entries.

== Statue of Joan of Arc or The Angel of Peace in Poitiers ==
A statue by Real del Sarte stands in the square des Cordeliers in Poitiers. The statue is known as "The Angel of Peace".

== Statue of Joan of Arc in the church Saint-Philippe-du-Roule in Paris ==
The marble statue, installed in 1920, stands in the choir area of the church. Joan wears a suit of armour with "Gallia" inscribed on her shield.

== Bust of Joan of Arc ==
This work is located in the Église Saint-Rémy in Domrémy-la-Pucelle in the Vosges district of Lorraine. Real del Sarte carves the head of Joan in white marble. Her eyes are closed and she wears a bronze crown of thorns. The pedestal is of onyx and on the front Real del Sarte has carved a dove with open wings. The work was completed in 1929.

== Statue of Joan of Arc in Marseilles ==
Another copy of the Rouen "Jeanne au bûcher" stands in the Église Saint-Philippe, 121 rue Sylvabelle – 6e arrondissement of Marseilles. A work in stone, completed in 1937.

== Statue of Joan of Arc in Nimes ==
The stone statue of Joan of Arc stands in the Place des Carmes in Nîmes in Gard. A committee to organize the erection of the statue was formed in 1942 and after a public subscription organised in 1943, the pedestal for the statue was erected in front of the church of Saint-Paul in May 1943. The statue itself was delivered in April, 1944 and stored in a hangar near Beauclaire. It was officially delivered to the town in December 1956 but the decision to erect it was delayed until 1964. This work was also supplied to Limoges in 1942 and to Grenoble in 1945. Experts have expressed the view that Real del Sarte had been inspired by the statue of Joan of Arc sculpted by Paul Dardé for Montpellier in 1918. At the foot of the statue, and in bronze is a sculpture depicting a heart being consumed by flames. The text, "Rouen 1431″ records the year and place of Joan's execution and there is also an inscription stating -"Ce coeur contient de la terre prelevee au lieu sacre du bûcher de Jeanne d'Arc". This tells us that the heart contains soil from the spot where Joan was burnt at the stake".

== Statue of Joan of Arc in Montréal ==
A replica of Real del Sarte's representation of Joan of Arc in Rouen. Her eyes are closed and she is praying, her feet on a stake and flames are beginning to envelop her. The work is carved from the hard stone of Poitou. The work measures a little over 3 metres and weighs 4 tons. The work was a gift by the sculptor to the University of Montréal. At the base of the statue Real del Sarte has carved the words

"J'ai fait cette œuvre avec amour pour nos amis canadiens, à la gloire de la sainte patronne de la paix du monde"

This is one of five replicas of Real del Sarte's 1928 composition for Rouen known as "Jeanne au bûcher" and in 1950, Real del Sarte made a gift of the work to the then rector of Montréal University in recognition of Franco-Canadian friendship and the religious nature of the university at that time.

== The work "Jeanne au bûcher" in Buenos Aires in Argentina ==
Another replica of the Rouen work can be seen in Buenos Aires in Argentine. It is located near the entrance to the Club de los Pescadores facing Jorge Newberry airport by the Rio de la Plata. It carries the inscription

"J'ai fait cette œuvre du plus pur symbole à la gloire de la Patrie et du Sacrifice"

It is recorded that this was a gift made in 1948 by Alberto Dodero of Compañía Argentina de Navegación Dodero S.A.

== Statue of Joan of Arc in Vaucouleurs Castle ==
At the end of the Second World War, the US Congress commissioned a statue of Joan of Arc intended for the "Congressional Hall of Heroes". Real del Sarte was the sculptor but when it was time to pay for the work, Congress refused to pay. It was purchased instead by the Department of the Meuse and was placed in the upper church of the Vaucouleurs castle, where it remains to this day. The upper church is closed to the general public but with special permission from the city it may be viewed.

== Statue of Joan of Arc in Wissous in Essonne ==
Another copy of the Rouen "Jeanne d'Arc au bûcher" composition, this time in plaster.

== Other works- Those with a military theme ==
=== Monument to the Polish volunteers of the 1914-1918 war ===
This monument is dedicated to all the Polish volunteers who fought alongside the French army in the 1914-1918 war especially in May 1915 and the fighting at Souchez, Carency, and Neuville-Saint-Vaast. The erection of the monument was organised by members of the Polish community in France. It was inaugurated on 21 May 1933 by the Polish ambassador. The inscriptions read

"ZA NASZA WOLNOSC I WASZA"

which translates as "our liberty and yours" and

"À la mémoire des volontaires polonais qui le 9 mai 1915 se sont portés à l'assaut de la côte 140 et sont tombés pour la résurrection de la Pologne et la victoire de la France"

=== Tank Memorial at Berry-Au-Bac ===
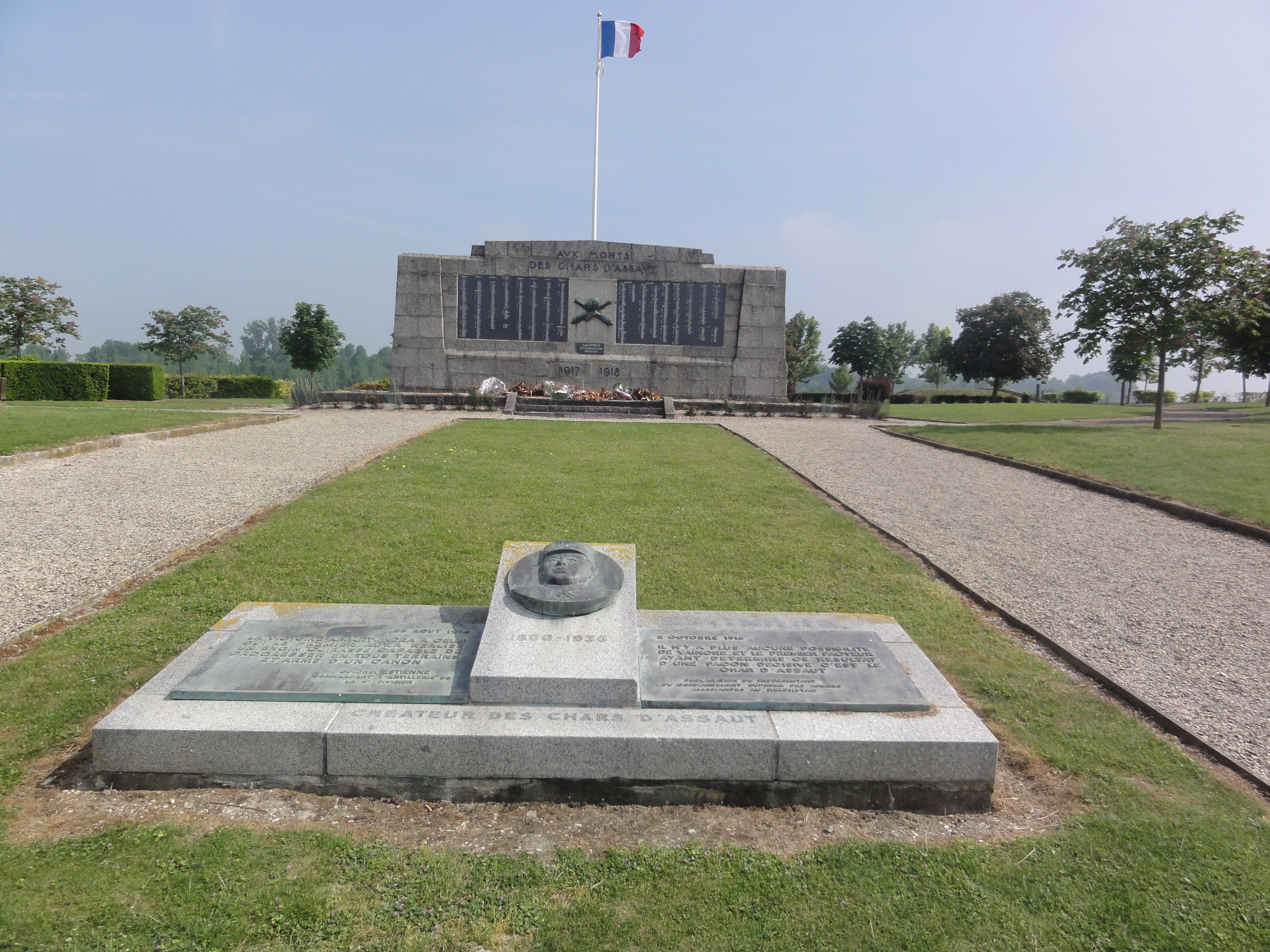
Tank Memorial at Berry-Au-Bac. In front of this memorial is a further memorial dedicated to General Estienne

The Tank Memorial (Mémorial des Chars d'Assaut) pays tribute to all those tank drivers who fell in the course of 1917–1918. It was erected following the efforts of a group of ex-infantrymen, and inaugurated on 2 July 1922 in the presence of both Marshals Foch and Pétain and Generals Mangin and Weygand, as well as General Estienne, the so-called "father of the tank". The monument is situated at Choléra Farm from where a mass attack of French tanks was thrown in the direction of Juvincourt on 16 April 1917. A plaque to the rear of the memorial recalls that on 16 April 1917, the 151st Infantry Regiment continued to advance with the assistance of Bossut's tanks right up to Béliers Wood. There are some tanks dating back to the 1950s on display near the memorial.

=== Monument to General Mangin in Paris ===
A monument to General Mangin was erected in the place Denys-Cochin in Paris, with sculptural work by Real del Sarte. It was destroyed in October 1940 by the occupying Germans, one of the few memorials linked to the 1914-1918 war that was touched by them. It is recorded that the instruction to destroy the monument came from Adolf Hitler himself. The work was reconstructed after the war and re-erected by the church of Saint-François-Xavier in Paris' 7th arrondissement. There was another statue of Mangin in the "clairière de Rethondes" but this was also pulled down by the Germans. The Germans had not forgotten Mangin's record when he was the Governor of the occupied Rhineland in the 1920s.

=== Monument dedicated to the 106th French Infantry Regiment ===
It was by their efforts in the Battle of the Marne from 6 to 12 September 1914 that the Franco-British forces halted the German advance and by mid-September the front started to form. The German Army took up position on the "Crête des Éparges" (Éparges ridge) about 20 kilometres east of Verdun. This ridge provided an excellent observation point to whoever held it and from February to April 1915, the French attempted to dislodge the Germans from it. It was the 106th French Infantry that led the fighting under the command of sub-lieutenant Maurice Genevoix. The fighting was brutal with the area under constant artillery fire and conditions were amongst the hardest endured along the front-line. Finally on 11 April 1915, whilst both sides were claiming victory, the French had taken 80% of the ridge by not "Point X" which had been their objective. The fighting for the Éparges ridge was the precursor for the commencement of the fighting at Verdun in 1916. Losses were substantial. The style of fighting changed as the war progressed and in this and other areas much of it was now to take place underground. The war became a war of mines and it was not until 1918 that the ridge was finally taken, this with much assistance from colonial and American troops. It was at Éparges that Real del Sarte fought and lost part of one arm, so it was fitting that he should carry out the sculpture for the regimental memorial erected in 1935. The work was supervised by Georges Ricome who had been an officer with the regiment. The words "Je crois" are inscribed on the front of the memorial and on one side there is a quotation from Maurice Genevoix-

"Vous qui avez pris votre vie à deux mains et l'avez portée d'un élan jusqu'aux lèvres de l'entonnoir sous les balles"

The bas-relief is said to be a metaphor portraying the descent from the Cross, with Mary being France itself and Christ a soldier who has sacrificed his life for the Motherland.

=== Statue of Maréchal Joffre ===
Real del Sarte's bronze statue shows Joffre on a horse and he appears to be pointing to the nearby Eiffel tower. It is located on the Champ de Mars in Paris, just by the École Militaire. It was sculpted in 1939 by Real del Sarte.

=== The Ferme de Navarin Monument. Souhain in Oise ===
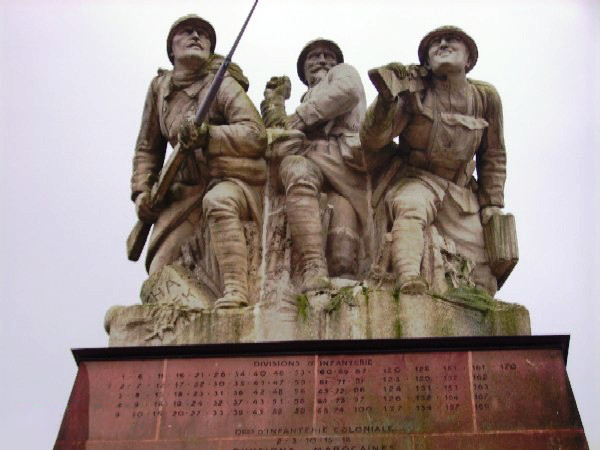
Sculpture on the Ferme de Navarin monument

Maxime Real del Sarte's composition on the top of this monument's pyramid shape structure features a group of three soldiers in "attack" mode. Reportedly the soldier in the centre was meant to represent a likeness of General Gouraud. The soldier on the right was supposedly based on Quentin Roosevelt, the nephew of Theodore Roosevelt who was killed near Cambrai on 14 July 1918, and the soldier on the left was said to be based on Maxime Real del Sarte's brother, killed in the Champagne during the war. Del Sarte himself was injured fighting in the Éparges section of the Verdun front on 29 January 1916 and part of his left arm had to be amputated. The monument remembers the efforts of the French army units who fought in the area.

== Other works ==
=== Work entitled "Vendéen fidèle" ===
In this 1935 work hommage is paid to the population of the Vendée. The work is 2.50 metres high.

=== Statue in the Église St Vaast in Béthune ===
A statue of St Michael slaying a dragon can be seen in the Église St Vaast in Béthune.

=== Monument aux Infirmières in Pierrefonds ===
This monument honours those nurses who lost their lives on the battlefields in the 1914–1918 war. It is located in the chaussée Defublé. Elisabeth Jalaguier, born in 1890, was active as a nurse in the 1914–1918 war and served at the Hôtel des Bains in Pierrefonds which was being used as a military hospital. In 1918 she was struck during an aerial bombardment and died three months after the war ended. In May 1919 she was awarded the Légion d'Honneur. A white stone was placed on the spot where Jalaguier was struck and in 1933 a public subscription was organised by another nurse called "Maman Perdon" and a Doctor Ferrand and in June 1955 the monument was erected in place of the white stone. The "Union Nationale des Combattants" had sold the monument to Pierrefonds and it was restored and erected in the town in 1996. The statue was cast in bronze based on a plaster model by Real del Sarte.

=== Sculptures on the tombs of Philippe d'Orléans (1869–1926) and Ferdinand d'Orléans (1884–1924) ===
These works by Real del Sarte are in the Chapelle royale Saint-Louis at Dreux in Eure-et-Loir.

=== Sculpture of Mary and Child in Lausanne ===
This work is located in one of the two chapels of reconciliation in the parish church of St Joseph in Lausanne.

=== Monument dedicated to Edward VII ===
Real del Sarte was the sculptor of this monument in Biarritz. It was inaugurated in 1922.

=== Church of Saint-Louis in Port-Gentil ===
This church in Gabon was built between 1928 and 1936 and was given the name of Louis in honour of Monseigneur Louis Matron whose idea it was to build the church. The church contains a statue of Saint Louis by Real Del Sarte (1888-1954).

=== The work "Le premier toit" ===
This Real del Sarte work is located in Le Parc Pasteur in Orléans in Loiret. It is on loan from the Louvre in Paris. It is recorded that Real del Sarte had started this piece in 1914 and before enlisting in the army and when he returned from fighting and recovered from his wound, he returned to it. It is a stark composition featuring a naked man and woman who face each other on their knees, each putting their arms on the other's shoulders. The sculpture was awarded the Grand Prix National des Beaux-Arts in 1921. The description "Le premier toit" translates as "The first roof".

=== The sculpture entitled "Résistance" in Misérieux in Ain, Rhône-Alpes ===
Sculpted in Sicilian stone in 1920. Portrays a naked couple in combat.

=== The work La Femme au chat ===
Also in Buenos Aires, and another gift to the city by Alberto Dodero, is a marble work entitled "La Femme au chat". It measures 1.60 metres in height. It is located in the Palermo quarter of the city at "Las Canitas" on the avenue Chenaut et Arce.

=== Statue of Saint Maxime ===
This work in white painted stone is located in the Église paroissiale Saint-Maxime in Antony in Hauts-de-Seine in the Ile-de-France. It is dated 1946. Del Sarte portrays Saint Maxime in the attire of a bishop. He stands over a dragon which he has just slain. Originally the statue was placed inside the church but is now located outside.

=== Statue of Saint Sébastien ===
This small statue is located in the Saint-Nicolas parish church in the rue de l'Eglise, Baboeuf in the Oise region of Picardy. It is carved from a combination of wood and stone, the arrows piercing St Sébastien being in wood.

=== Various furnishings for the parish church of Saint-Jacques-le-Majeur in Courtavon in Haut-Rhin Alsace ===
For this church in the rue de la Chapelle, Sarte worked on an altar table, a cross, a war memorial and various statues and tombstones.

=== Two Inscribed tablets in remembrance of the dead of the 1914-1918 war ===
This Sarte work is located in the parish church of Saint-Melaine in La Chapelle-de-Brain in Ille-et-Vilaine in Brittany. It comprises two tablets with both being inscribed " AUX ENFANTS DE LA PAROISSE / MORTS POUR LA FRANCE / 1914 1918 / LA CHAPELLE SAINT MELAINE". The tablet on the left hand side reads " MISERICORDIEUX JESUS / DONNEZ LEUR LE REPOS ETERNEL / CEUX QUI PIEUSEMENT SONT MORTS POUR LA PATRIE / ONT DROIT QU'A LEUR CERCUEIL LA FOULE VIENNE ET PRIE" whilst that on the right reads "VIERGE COMPATISSANTE / CONSOLEZ LES AFFLIGES / HEUREUX CEUX QUI SONT MORTS DANS LES GRANDES BATAILLES / COUCHES DESSUS LE SOL A LA FACE DE DIEU". The names of those honoured are listed in the order they died.

=== Monument to Alexander of Yugoslavia ===
This monument stands in the Place de Colombie in the 16e arrondissement of Paris. It was completed in 1936. Cast in bronze by the foundry Durenne the inscriptions read

"AUX ROIS / PIERRE Ier DE SERBIE / LE LIBERATEUR / ET / ALEXANDRE Ier DE YOUGOSLAVIE / L'UNIFICATEUR / HOMMAGE / DE PARIS ET DE LA FRANCE / LEURS DEUX GRANDS AMIS" and "CONSERVEZ LA YOUGOSLAVIE / CONSERVEZ L'AMITIE FRANCO-YOUGOSLAVE / DERNIERES PAROLES DU ROI ALEXANDRE EXPIRANT / MARSEILLE 9 OCTOBRE 1934"

and in a bronze plaque at the rear another inscriptions read

" J'AI TENU A L'HONNEUR / QUE MA CARRIERE MILITAIRE / DEBUTAT SOUS LE DRAPEAU / FRANCAIS. PIERRE Ier 1871 / EVASION DU LIEUTENANT PIERRE / KARAGEORGEVITCH QUI FRANCHIT / LA LOIRE A ORLEANS / 17 OCTOBRE 1871"

and

" LA SERBIE N'EST PLUS MAIS SON ARMEE RESTE / NOUS SOMME PRETS A VENIR CONTINUER / LA LUTTE SUR LE SOL FRANCAIS / TELEGRAMME DU PRINCE REGENT ALEXANDRE AU PRESIDENT POINCARE / DECEMBRE 1915".

=== Bust on the grave of Ernest Berger in the Cimetière de Vaugirard ===
The cemetery contains the graves of many members of the extreme right factions supporting the royalist cause in France. There are members of the "Camelots du roi" and of "Action Française" buried here, many of whom were to suffer violent deaths. Marius André, Pierre Juhel, Georges Calzant and Eugène Marsan are all buried here as well as Marius Plateau killed in 1923 and Marcel Langois killed in fights with communist agitators. The grave of Ernest Berger, assassinated in 1925, is adorned by a bust by Real del Sarte.

=== Statue of Louise Bettignies in Lille ===
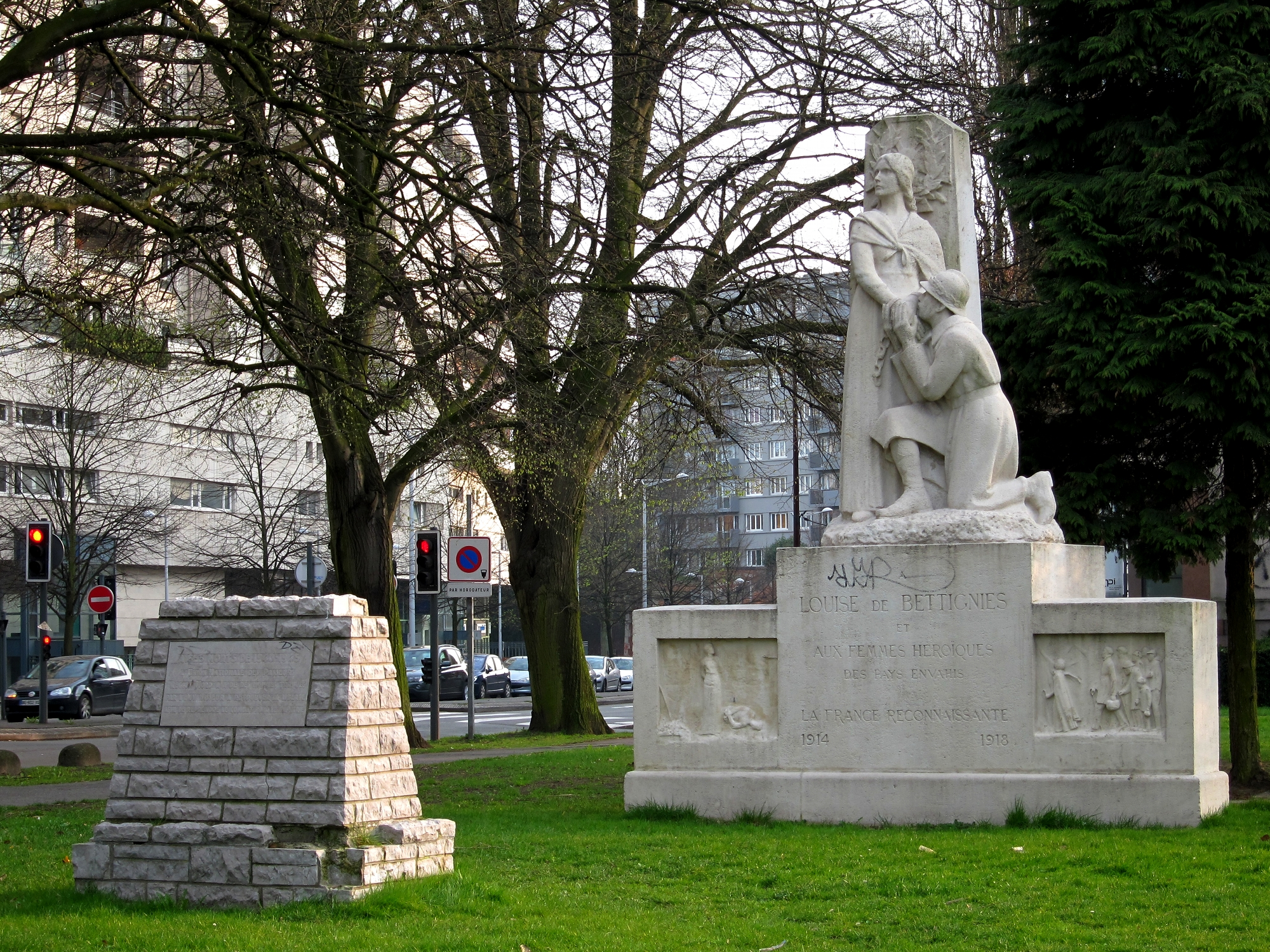
Statue of Louise Bettignies

Real del Sarte was the sculptor of this statue in Lille. Bettignies had worked as a spy for the British in the 1914-1918 war, using the name Alice Dubois.

=== Statue of the Duke of Sicily ===
Real del Sarte was the sculptor of this statue in Hautville la Guichard. It was completed in 1934.

=== Stations of the Cross/Chemin des Croix in Saint Jean de Luz ===
Real del Sarte completed the Stations of the Cross for the church of Saint Jean de Luz in 1950.
