= Mathieu of Boulogne =

French cleric and medieval Latin satirist (c. 1260–c. 1320)

- Born: c. 1260
- Died: c. 1320
- Other names: Mahieu; Mahieu le Bigame
- Occupations: Cleric; writer
- Writing career
- Pen name: Matheolus; Matheolulus
- Language: Medieval Latin
- Genres: Satire; anti-marriage literature
- Notable work: Liber lamentationum Matheoluli (Lamentationes Matheoluli)

Mathieu of Boulogne (c.1260–c.1320), also known as Matheolus, was a medieval cleric and Latin poet best known for the long satirical poem Liber lamentationum Matheoluli (also cited as Lamentationes Matheoluli), a major work of late medieval anti-marriage and antifeminist literature that circulated widely in later medieval and early modern Europe, especially through French adaptations.

== Name and identity ==
The author is commonly referred to by the Latinized name Matheolus (and the diminutive Matheolulus) used in the poem's title and self-presentation. Modern scholarship treats biographical claims with caution because the work adopts a literary persona and blends learned citation with satirical complaint; the poem is nevertheless the principal basis for reconstructing the author's background.

== Life ==
Details of Mathieu's life are not independently documented and are primarily derived from the author-persona within the Lamentationes as discussed by modern editors and reviewers. In that narrative, he presents himself as having been born in Boulogne-sur-Mer, educated at Orléans, and active as a canon lawyer in Thérouanne before marrying a widow named Petra (also given as Petronilla). The poem frames this marriage as professionally ruinous because clerical marriage could trigger canonical penalties under medieval definitions of "bigamy", and it uses the persona's fall in status as a premise for extended complaint and satire.

The author's approximate dates (c.1260–c.1320) are reflected in library authority data, though they remain approximate.

== Works ==
=== Liber lamentationum Matheoluli / Lamentationes Matheoluli ===
Mathieu's principal work, the Lamentationes Matheoluli (also called the Latin Lamentations in modern scholarship), is a poem of over 5,600 lines arranged in four books and composed in the late thirteenth century; a modern editor's dating places completion between 15 February 1290 and January 1291. The poem draws on biblical, classical, patristic, and medieval materials alongside satirical autobiographical complaint, and it became an important source-text in late medieval debates over women and marriage.

Modern reviewers describe the work as "a monument of medieval misogyny" in the sense that it attacks women through a broad anti-marriage polemic, while also targeting the institution of marriage itself. The poem's four-book structure has been summarized as follows:

- Books I–II: sustained denunciation of women and marriage, framed through the speaker's marital misery and generalized attacks.
- Book III: more digressive material, including a debate with God that ranges beyond marriage to broader moral and social themes, followed by visionary material.
- Book IV: encomia addressed to church officials connected with Thérouanne, coupled with requests for prayers and patronage, and further visionary conclusions.

=== Transmission, translations, and influence ===
Although the Latin text circulated in manuscript, the work's later fame was strongly amplified by French reception. A major French verse translation was produced by Jehan (Jean) le Fèvre in the late fourteenth century, and scholarship notes that the French tradition often supplanted the memory of the Latin original in later centuries. Le Fèvre also composed a response poem, Le Livre de Leesce (Book of Gladness), which counters arguments from the Lamentations and became part of the wider pro- and anti-woman controversy that later scholarship groups under the querelle des femmes.

Later authors drew on (and sometimes rebutted) the text in important literary debates. A modern review links the poem's French reception to rebuttal writing by Christine de Pizan and to later defenses of women such as Martin le Franc’s Champion des Dames.

== Manuscripts and editions ==
For many years, the work was primarily accessible in the bilingual edition produced by Anton-Gerard van Hamel, which edited the Latin alongside the French tradition and included extensive study and notes; at the time, van Hamel edited the Latin from the Utrecht manuscript then known to him. Subsequent manuscript work expanded the known Latin tradition: one review reports that van Hamel's 1888 discovery of a manuscript at Utrecht helped revive scholarly access to the poem, and later scholarship identified further witnesses and excerpt manuscripts. A 2016 review of Thomas Klein's edition states that a complete modern edition can now be based on the surviving manuscript tradition, described there as including five complete witnesses plus excerpt collections (with one Strasbourg manuscript destroyed in 1870).

Notable editions include:

- Anton-Gerard van Hamel (ed.), Les Lamentations de Matheolus et Le Livre de Leësce (2 vols., 1892–1905).
- Alfred Schmitt (ed.), partial critical edition (Books I–II), published 1974.
- Thomas Klein (ed.), first complete critical edition of the Latin poem (2014).

== See also ==
- Querelle des femmes
- Christine de Pizan
- Jean le Fèvre (poet)
- Misogyny
- Antifeminism
- Medieval Latin literature
