= Indalecio Sarasqueta =

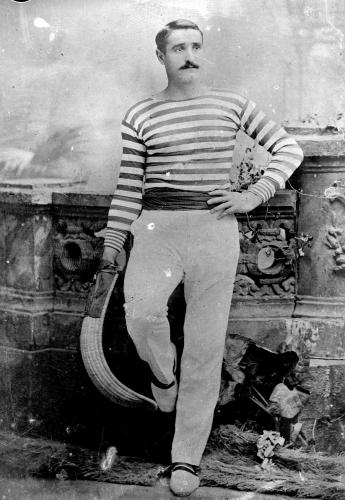
- Txikito de Éibar with a Xistera

Personal information
- Full name: Indalecio Sarasqueta
- Nickname: Txikito de Eibar
- Born: May 22, 1860 Durango (Vizcaya), Guipúzcoa
- Died: May 1, 1900 (aged 39) Eibar, Gipuzkoa
- Years active: 1876-1886

Sport
- Country: Spain
- Sport: Basque pelota

Indalecio León Zarasqueta Uriarte (May 22, 1860 – April 1, 1900), known as Txikito de Eibar or Aizpiri txiki, was a Basque pelota player who participated in pala, Hand-pelota, remonte, long bat and short bat categories. Due to his physical characteristics he received the nickname of Txiquito, meaning in Euskera Little. Txiquito de Eibar was one of the first professional players of pelota at the time of its beginnings, in the 19th century.

== Early life ==
Indalecio Sarasqueta was born in Durango, Basque Country. He was the son of Julián de Zarasqueta and Braulia de Uriarte who resided on Aizpiri baserri, where came his later nickname Aizpiri txiki. The Uriarte family was from Durango, where Sarasqueta was born due to a Basque tradition of women giving light in their family homes. The family moved later to Eibar, where he grew up.

== Professional career ==
Txiquito made his debut in 1876, when he was 16 years old, interrumping with importance in the early game scenarios.

=== First games and later modalities ===
On July 26, 1876 beat on Eibar in hand-pelota modality the priest Laba, from Marquina, taking immediate importance. In August they played again in Bilbao where he won again. In 1877 played several games on pala modality, where he won to one of the most important players of the time, Bishimodu and later to Carricalushe. In 1877 he also played several games on long bat and short bat category.

In 1878 he accepted the challenge of a French pelotari that consisted on hit always on the service with the right hand and only use the left after rebound, the challenger could play free of these conditions. The game was played on San Sebastián with a tantora of 50, with a final win of Txiquito de Eibar for 27-50. The same year he participated also in similar challenges with different tasks which he won.

In 1858 Basket-pelota was introduced from French Basque country, Txikito de Eibar developed the game to the point that was introduced as a new modality on Madrid fronton. Sarasqueta successfully dominated all the categories of the game during his professional years.

=== Argentina ===
In 1884 Sarasqueta traveled to Buenos Aires where he faced Paysandú, a local popular player, winning the game with 80 points on the modalities of square bat and "traer y traer" (in this modality a player could pick the kind of ball he wanted to use). Paysanyú used a hard and highly rebound ball, that combined with his service strength made him a difficult rival. After a bad start, Txiquito turned over the game winning with 80 points, leaving the Argentinian player 40 points behind.

The games against Argentinian and Basque players in the country gave him fame in Buenos Aires. In 1886, he went back to Spain where, after losing several games due to the weakness caused by his delicate health, he retired. He returned to Buenos Aires where he became the national fronton manager until it was closed on 1894, when he returned again to Spain.

=== Later years and death ===
After his definitive return from Argentina in 1894 Indalecio Sarasqueta worked on several frontons as manager such as Beti Jai in Madrid, Euskalduna in Bilbao and the Barcelona fronton. Txiquito continued playing unprofessionally in charity or challenge events, often attended to the games with his son. His preferred modality was pala, in which he could maintain a good level.

Ill with tuberculosis, Sarasqueta retired and fell into poverty, but was helped by other pelotaris and amateurs. On April 1, 1900, he died in Éibar in his house on Elgeta-kale street known as Olave.
