= Bouconville-Vauclair =

- Commune
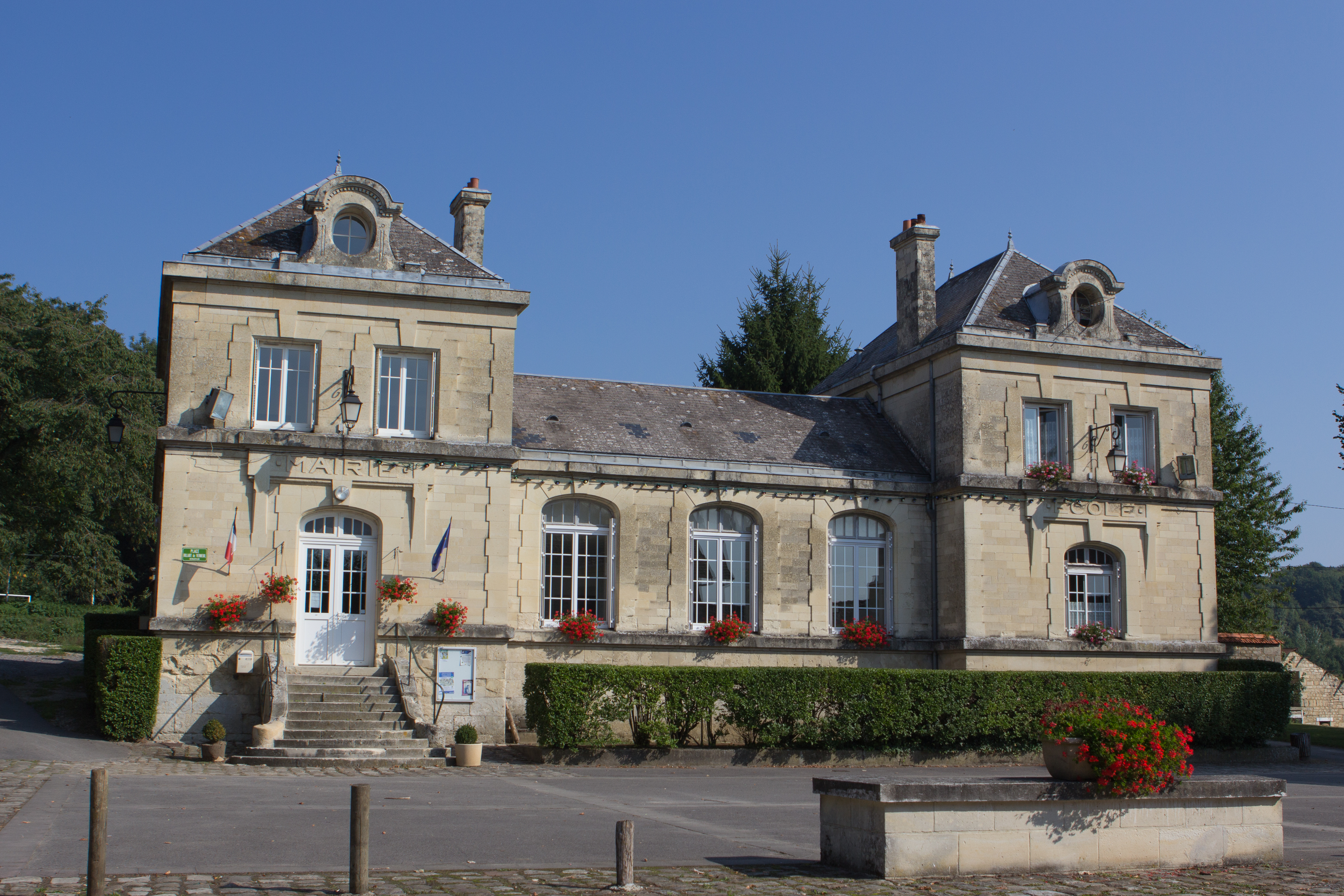
- The town hall of Bouconville-Vauclair
- Location of Bouconville-Vauclair
- Location within France Location within Hauts-de-France
- Coordinates: 49°27′57″N 3°45′23″E
- Country: France
- Region: Hauts-de-France
- Department: Aisne
- Arrondissement: Laon
- Canton: Villeneuve-sur-Aisne
- Intercommunality: Chemin des Dames

Government
  - Mayor (2026–32): Stéphane Brateau
- Area^{1}: 13.04 km^{2} (5.03 sq mi)
- Elevation: 110 m (360 ft)
- Highest elevation: 207 m (679 ft)
- Lowest elevation: 84 m (276 ft)
- Population (2023): 181
  - Density: 13.9/km^{2} (35.9/sq mi)
- Time zone: UTC+01:00 (CET)
  - Summer (DST): UTC+02:00 (CEST)
- INSEE/Postal code: 02102 /02860
- ^{1} French Land Register data, which excludes lakes, ponds, glaciers > 1 km^{2} (0.386 sq mi or 247 acres) and river estuaries.

Bouconville-Vauclair (French pronunciation: [bukɔ̃vil voklɛʁ]) is a commune in the French department of Aisne, administrative region of Hauts-de-France (Picardy as historical region), northern France.

== Geography ==
The river Ailette flows west through the commune.

== Population ==
Historical population
Year	Pop.	±% p.a.
1968	196	—
1975	180	−1.21%
1982	184	+0.31%
1990	170	−0.98%
1999	161	−0.60%
2007	157	−0.31%
2012	202	+5.17%
2017	187	−1.53%
2023	181	−0.54%
Source: INSEE

== See also ==
- Communes of the Aisne department
- The works of Maxime Real del Sarte
