= Basque pelota ball =

A Basque pelota ball is a ball designed for the sport of Basque pelota, variations of the kind and size of balls are given by the peculiar category.

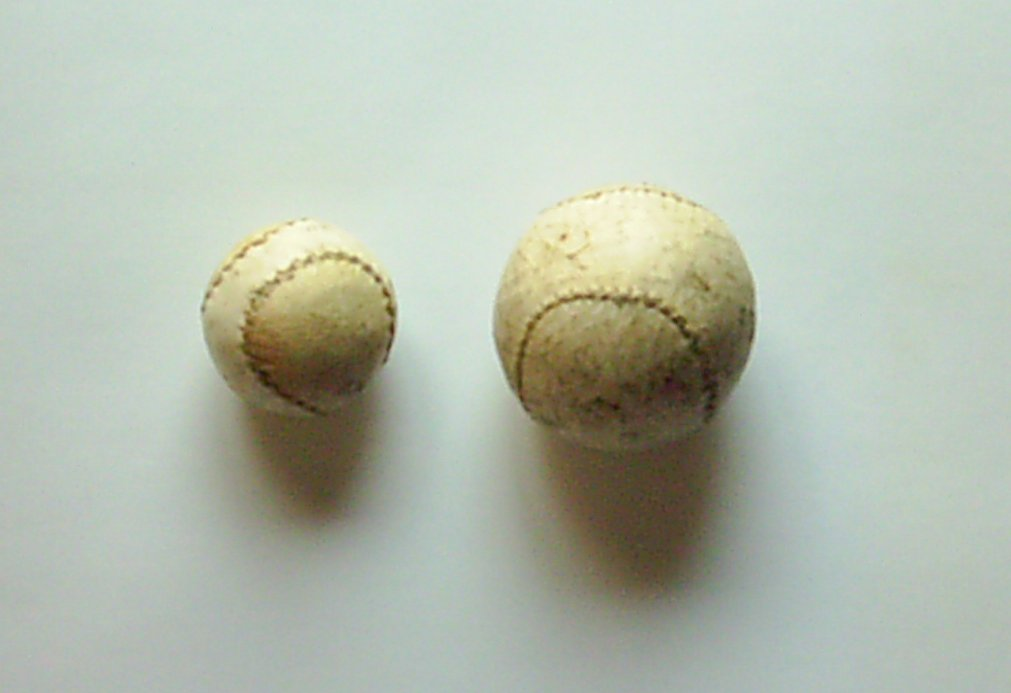
Hand-pelota ball (right) in comparison with a Valencian variation ball

== Hand Pelota ==
Hand-pelota ball is traditionally made of a Buxus core, covered by several layers of Latex with a final layer of leather.

== Paleta Categories ==
A highly elastic rubber made ball is employed for speed games. The ball reaches a speed of 120 km/h in a typical service. The fastest ever recorded throw of a pelota ball was 302 km/h, about twice the speed of the fastest recorded pitch of a baseball.
