= Devoucoux =

Horse saddle manufacturer

- Industry: manufacturing of travel items, leather goods and saddlery
- Founded: 1985; 41 years ago in Sare, Pyrénées-Atlantiques
- Founder: Jean-Michel Devoucoux
- Number of employees: 77
- Website: https://devoucoux.com

Devoucoux, named after its founder, is a French manufacturing company that produces high-end horse saddles.

== History ==
The company was founded in the year 1985 by Jean-Michel Devoucoux in his workshop in the Basque village of Sare. Devoucoux was an ex-apprentice groom from Ciboure in the Pyrénées Atlantiques and had trained to make both harnesses and saddles. The company now has sixty employees.

The initial US product line was launched in 1999.

In 2007, Director Brice Goguet was replaced by Benjamin Auzimour for United States operations, and Didier Brailly took over in the UK.

In 2008, the company supported the British Horse Society by offering a saddle as a prize to new members.

== Sponsorship ==
Devoucoux is an active sponsorship brand, sponsoring riders including Thomas Carlile, Gilles Pons, Rodolphe Scherer, Stanislas de Zuchovitch, Pippa Funnell, Dani Evans, and Jennie Brannigan.

Devoucoux was the sponsor of the $30,000 Otter Creek Grand Prix, a show jumping competition held over five weeks at the 2006 Vermont Summer Festival. They were also a sponsor of the $25,000 Devoucoux Wild Card Grand Prix, HITS Culpeper, Virginia.
