= Sare, Pyrénées-Atlantiques =

Sare Sara (Basque)
- Commune
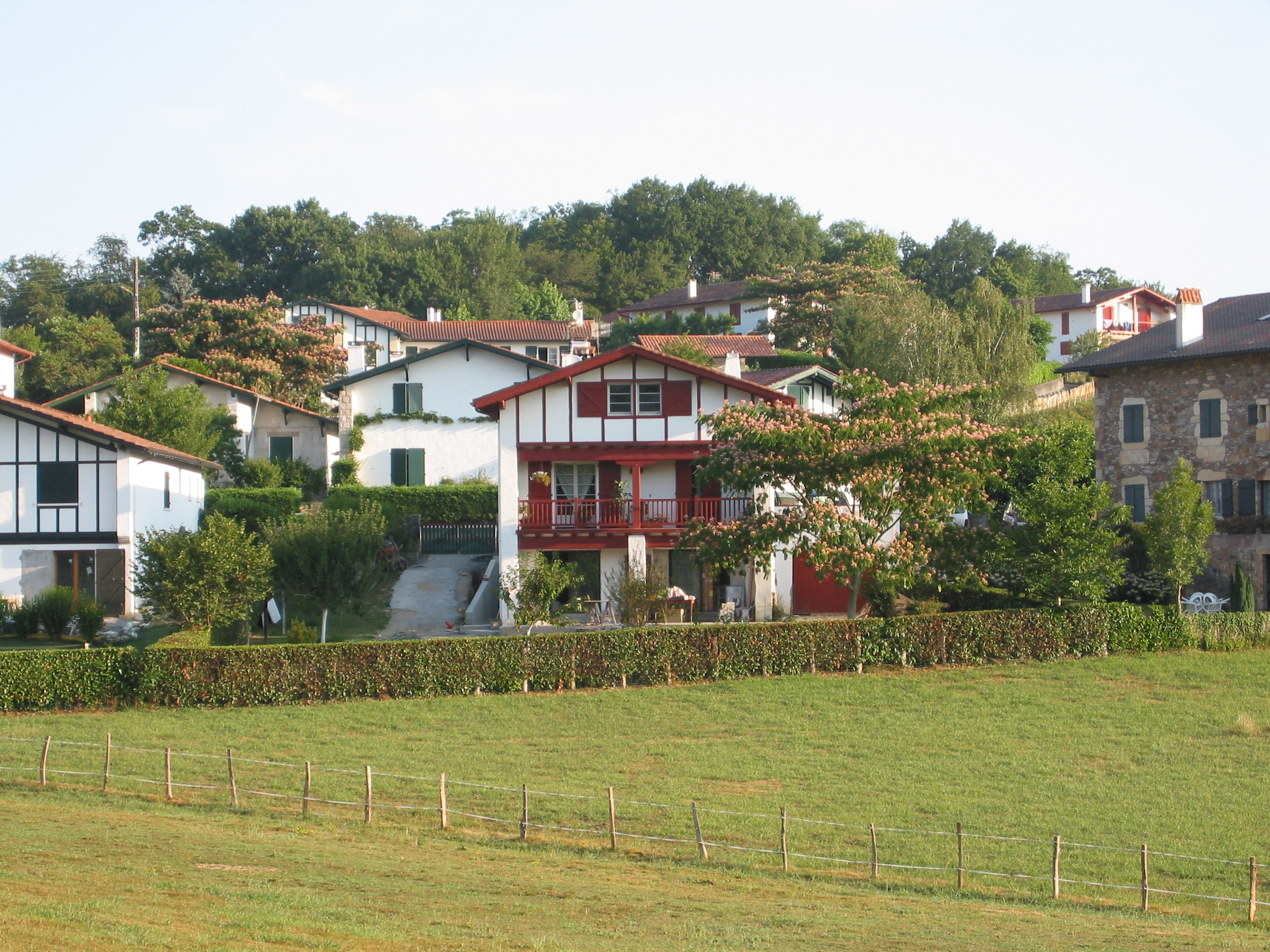
- A general view of Sare

- Coat of arms
- Location of Sare
- Location within France Location within Nouvelle-Aquitaine
- Coordinates: 43°18′49″N 1°34′45″W
- Country: France
- Region: Nouvelle-Aquitaine
- Department: Pyrénées-Atlantiques
- Arrondissement: Bayonne
- Canton: Ustaritz-Vallées de Nive et Nivelle
- Intercommunality: CA Pays Basque

Government
  - Mayor (2020–2026): Battit Laborde
- Area^{1}: 51.34 km^{2} (19.82 sq mi)
- Elevation: 77 m (253 ft)
- Highest elevation: 881 m (2,890 ft)
- Lowest elevation: 27 m (89 ft)
- Population (2023): 2,763
  - Density: 53.82/km^{2} (139.4/sq mi)
- Time zone: UTC+01:00 (CET)
  - Summer (DST): UTC+02:00 (CEST)
- INSEE/Postal code: 64504 /64310
- ^{1} French Land Register data, which excludes lakes, ponds, glaciers > 1 km^{2} (0.386 sq mi or 247 acres) and river estuaries.

Sare (French pronunciation: [saʁ]; Occitan: Sarai; Basque: Sara) is a village and a commune in the Pyrénées-Atlantiques department in south-western France on the border with Spain. It is part of the traditional Basque province of Labourd. It is a member of Les Plus Beaux Villages de France (The Most Beautiful Villages of France) Association.

== Geography ==
The commune is backed by the Pyrenees mountain range, which forms a basin around the village open to the east and the north. Its geological history explains the formation of caves that were occupied by the Aurignacian. The Bronze Age left a number of funerary monuments on the slopes and mountain plateaus of the region.

It is located some 15 km (9.3 mi) to the east of Saint-Jean-de-Luz and the Bay of Biscay, in the western foothills of the Pyrenees.

The summit of La Rhune, a mountain iconic of the Basque country, is situated approximately 4 km (2.5 mi) to the west of the village. The summit can be reached by the Petit train de la Rhune, which commences from the Col de Saint-Ignace, 3.5 km (2.2 mi) to the west of the village on the D4 road to Saint-Jean-de-Luz.

== History ==
Today, its territory forms an enclave in the Navarre, a region of Spain, with which it shares a 25 km (16 mi) border. This in particular has had significant consequences on the history of the village, with centuries of pastoral agreements with neighbouring Spanish villages. During the Peninsular War the Anglo-Portuguese Army led by the future Duke of Wellington breached the frontier and repelled the French troops who had stationed themselves in forts on La Rhune.

The village contains many old buildings with around 283 houses identified by as dating partially as far back as the 15th century. The traditional architecture of these buildings, their exterior decorations and the orientation defines the archetype of the rural house that exists in the popular image of the "Basque House".

== Demography ==
The population of Sare has remained stable for 200 years. Since 1793 the only real development that has occurred began in 1990, and the population reached more than 2500 people in the 2010s.

Historical population
| Year | Pop. | ±% p.a. |
|---|---|---|
| 1968 | 1,921 | — |
| 1975 | 1,871 | −0.38% |
| 1982 | 1,930 | +0.44% |
| 1990 | 2,054 | +0.78% |
| 1999 | 2,184 | +0.68% |
| 2007 | 2,286 | +0.57% |
| 2012 | 2,535 | +2.09% |
| 2017 | 2,651 | +0.90% |
| 2023 | 2,763 | +0.69% |
Source: INSEE

== Economy ==
Agricultural activity remains a constant element of the town's economy, even though the location has hosted mining industries since the Middle Ages, and more recently a wool treatment mill. The proximity of the border with Spain, and the configuration of the terrain and the roadways, as well as the shared Basque languages, have given birth to a local economy shared between Spain and France, characterised by smuggling.

== Tourist attractions ==
Following are the famous places to see in Sare, Basque:

1. Le Train de la Rhune
2. Les Grottes de Sare
3. Le Musee du Gateau Basque
4. Parc Animalier Etxola
5. Ortillopitz
6. Eglise Saint-Martin de Sare
7. Office de Tourisme de Sare
8. Basq'quad
9. Bask Peche Nature
10. Suhalmendi, Decouverte du Porc Basque

== People ==
- Alberto Palacio, Basque engineer
- Wentworth Webster, English collector of Basque folk tales
- Victor Iturria, WWII decorated hero

== See also ==
- Communes of the Pyrénées-Atlantiques department
- Devoucoux
- End of Basque home rule in France
- The works of Maxime Real del Sarte
- Treaties of Good Correspondence
