= Ressons-sur-Matz =

- Commune
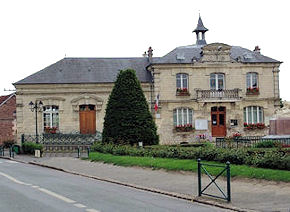
- Town hall

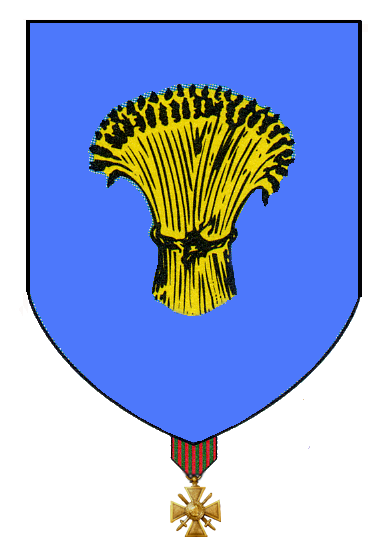
- Coat of arms
- Location of Ressons-sur-Matz
- Location within France Location within Hauts-de-France
- Coordinates: 49°32′27″N 2°44′48″E
- Country: France
- Region: Hauts-de-France
- Department: Oise
- Arrondissement: Compiègne
- Canton: Estrées-Saint-Denis
- Intercommunality: Pays des Sources

Government
  - Mayor (2020–2026): Alain De Paermentier
- Area^{1}: 9.23 km^{2} (3.56 sq mi)
- Highest elevation: 119 m (390 ft)
- Lowest elevation: 49 m (161 ft)
- Population (2023): 1,727
  - Density: 187/km^{2} (485/sq mi)
- Time zone: UTC+01:00 (CET)
  - Summer (DST): UTC+02:00 (CEST)
- INSEE/Postal code: 60533 /60490
- ^{1} French Land Register data, which excludes lakes, ponds, glaciers > 1 km^{2} (0.386 sq mi or 247 acres) and river estuaries.

Ressons-sur-Matz (French pronunciation: [ʁəsɔ̃ syʁ ma]) is a commune in the Oise department in northern France.

== See also ==
- Communes of the Oise department
- The works of Maxime Real del Sarte
