= Victor Iturria =

French paratrooper during World War II

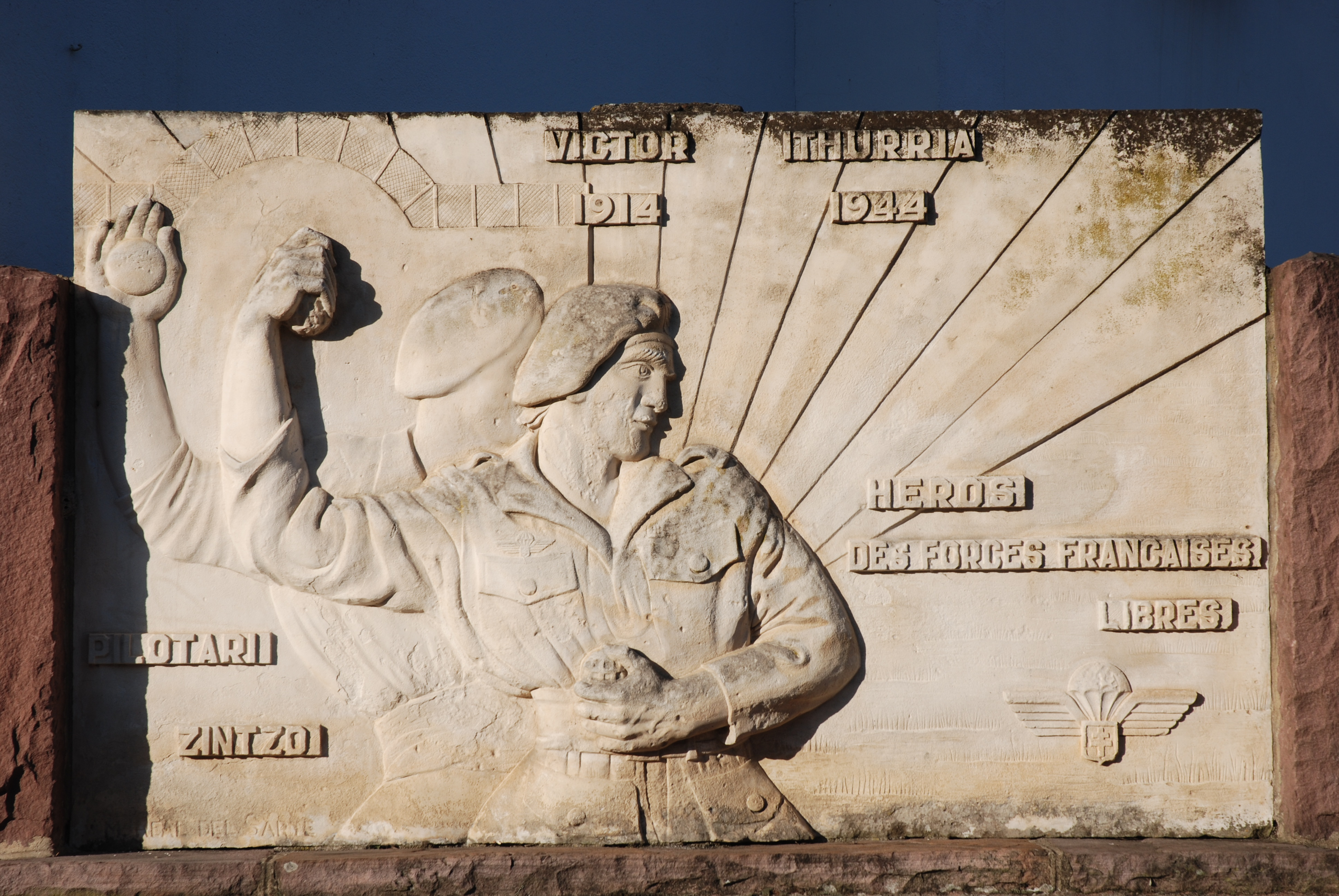
- Memorial plaque in Sare
- Born: 22 October 1914; Bassussarry, France
- Died: 25 August 1944 (aged 29); Blain, France
- Military career
- Allegiance: France
- Branch: French Army
- Service years: 1940–1944
- Rank: Adjudant
- Unit: 2e RCP
- Conflicts: World War II
- Awards: Companion of the Liberation; Médaille militaire; Croix de Guerre 1939–1945; Military Cross

Victor Iturria (22 October 1914 – 25 August 1944) was a Basque French paratrooper during World War II. He served as an anti-tank gunner during the Battle of France and was evacuated to England during the Battle of Dunkirk, where he joined the Free French Forces under General de Gaulle. Iturria was assigned to the Free French paratroopers that joined the British Special Air Service in North Africa, with them he took part in several raids behind enemy lines. In 1944, he parachuted into occupied France during the liberation and fought with the French Resistance in Brittany and then in Southern France, where he was killed in an ambush.

== Biography ==
Victor Iturria was born on 22 October 1914 in Bassussarry in the French Basque Country. He was mobilized and took part in the Battle of France as corporal and gunner of a 25 mm anti-tank gun. As such, he received a citation for having, by himself, disabling seven German tanks during an attack. Severely wounded during the retreat to Dunkirk in May 1940, he was evacuated to a hospital in England.

He was reinstated in early July 1940 and joined the Free French Forces, becoming a paratrooper in the 1st Air Infantry Company established in England in late September 1940 by Captain Georges Bergé. With his unit, now the 1st Parachute Company, he embarked for the Middle East in July 1941.

In September 1941, the 1st Parachute Company was renamed the Parachute Platoon of the Levant and then, as part of the Air Force, it was renamed the 1st Parachute Chasseur Company of the Free French Air Force. After being stationed at Beirut and Damascus, the unit moved in January 1942 to Kabret on the banks of the Suez Canal. It was integrated into Special Air Service Brigade (SAS Brigade) commanded by Major Stirling. The French SAS becomes the French Squadron and, equipped with jeeps, they became famous for raids against the German rear and airfields.

On 12 June 1942 in Libya, Victor Iturria took part in an attack, led by André Zirnheld, on an airfield in Benghazi. The following month, under command of Captain Jordan, he took part in three attacks on airfields in Cyrenaica and then, in August, an attack against Benghazi. In January 1943, he left Cairo with his unit for a 3 000 km raid to Tunisia, where it contributed to destroy the line of communication in the rear of the Mareth Line, where the Germans have stabilized their positions. Having already received two citations in the Order of the Army, he was decorated with the Médaille militaire in Algiers.

He returned to England with the survivors of the French Squadron, which became the 1st Air Infantry Battalion (1er BIA) in July 1943 and then the 4th Air Infantry Battalion (4e BIA) in November. Promoted to adjudant, Victor Iturria was made an instructor. On 1 July 1944, the 4e BIA changed name again 2nd Parachute Chasseur Regiment of the Air Force (2e RCP). Iturria was parachuted into Brittany on 3 August 1944. A week later, he took part in the attack on Lorient and on 15 August, at Quiberon, with his section, he captured a hundred prisoners. Sent to Nantes with the 2e RCP, he patrolled along the Loire.

On 25 August, Victor Iturria was killed by a machine gun burst in an ambush near Blain in Loire-Atlantique department. He was buried in the village of Sare in the Pyrénées-Atlantiques department.

== Decorations ==
- Companion of the Liberation (29 December 1944)
- Médaille militaire
- Croix de Guerre 1939–1945
- Médaille de la Résistance with rosette
- Military Cross (UK)
