= List of players of Basque pelota =

This is a List of players of Basque pelota ordered by the variant of Basque pelota for which they are renowned, and without taking into account their active time or their nationality.

== Cesta-Punta ==
- Jesús Abrego
- José de Amézola y Aspizúa
- Joseph Apesteguy
- Francisco Churruca, Patxi
- Maurice Durquetty
- Etchegaray
- Koteto Ezkurra
- Fernand Forgues
- Francisco Villota
- Aniceto Sagastizabal "Gasti"

== Handball ==
=== A ===
- Imanol Agirre
- Julian Albizuri
- Iñigo Altuna
- Jokin Altuna, Altuna III
- Martin Alustiza
- Jon Apezetxea
- Unai Apeztegia
- Alexis Apraiz
- Arturo Arbizu
- Jokin Argote
- Ignacio Artamendi
- Thierry Harizmendi, Arizmendi
- Fernando Arretxe, Arretxe I
- Iker Arretxe, Arretxe II
- Asier Arruti
- Mariano Juaristi, Atano III
- Auxkin Perez

=== B ===
- Iosu Baleztena
- Abel Barriola
- Aritz Begino
- Mikel Belloso
- Alberto Beloki, Beloki II
- Rubén Beloki, Beloki I
- Oinatz Bengoetxea, Bengoetxea VI
- Hodei Beobide
- Asier Berasaluze, Berasaluze IX
- Pablo Berasaluze, Berasaluze VIII

=== C ===
- Miguel Capellán
- Ismael Chafee

=== D ===
- Alberto del Rey
- Iñigo Diaz

=== E ===
- Andoni Eguskiza
- Aitor Elkoro
- Inaxio Errandonea
- Jokin Errasti
- Iñaki Esain
- Iñaki Eskudero
- Patxi Eugi
- Pedro Martínez de Eulate

=== G ===
- Enrike Galartza, Galartza V
- Xabier Galartza, Galartza VI
- Miguel Gallastegui
- Sebastien Gonzalez
- Mikel Goñi, Goñi II
- Fernando Goñi, Goñi III

=== I ===
- Jose Migel Iturriotz
- Luis Ibarlucea Guerricabeitia

=== J ===
- Mark Johnson

=== K ===
- Juantxo Koka

=== L ===
- Iñaki Larralde
- Oskar Lasa, Lasa III
- Aritz Laskurain
- Iñigo Leiza
- Scott Laswell

=== M ===
- Juan Martínez de Irujo
- Aratz Mendizabal, Mendizabal I
- Oier Mendizabal, Mendizabal II

=== N ===
- Jorge Nagore
- Iñigo Benito, Nalda III

=== O ===
- Asier Olaizola, Olaizola I
- Aimar Olaizola, Olaizola II
- Jabier Oteiza
- Iñaki Otxandorena

=== P ===
- Pampi Laduche
- Iñigo Pascual
- Patxi Ruiz
- Kepa Peñagarikano

=== R ===
- Raimundo Blanco, Rai
- Juan Ignacio Retegi, Retegi I
- Julián Retegi, Retegi II
- Julen Retegi, Retegi Bi
- Austin Roth

=== S ===
- Ekaitz Saralegi

=== T ===
- Augusto Ibáñez, Titín III
- Francisco Larrañaga, Txiquito de Iraeta
- Indalecio Sarasqueta, Txiquito de Éibar

=== U ===
- Mikel Unanue
- Xabier Urberuaga
- Rober Uriarte
- Pablo Urrizelki

=== W ===
- Waltary Agustí, Waltari

=== X ===
- Yves Salaberry, Xala

=== Z ===
- Oier Zearra
- Aitor Zubieta

== Pala ==
- Juan Pablo García
- Óscar Insausti

== See also ==
- Asegarce, pelota company
- Aspe, pelota company
