= Bare-handed Pelota First League Doubles =

The Bare-handed Pelota First League Doubles known as Campeonato de España de mano parejas is the second most important tournament of Hand-pelota category in Basque pelota, after the 1st Hand-Pelota singles championship, known as manomanista. The teams are formed by a Forward and a Defender, and the games are played to 22 points.

== History ==
The competition was created by the Spanish Federation of Basque Pelota on 1941 at the same time of manomanista, played every 2 years, but for a lack of interest and agreement the competition was suspended until 1978. In 1973 the two hand-pelota companies that operated at the time, Empresas Unidas and Eskulari, held professional championships of doubles apart. In 1978 the companies finally agreed to merge both tournaments into one, named Campeonato de España (Championship of Spain). Since 1978 the championship has been played annually. The first winning partners were Onaindia and Urcelay, and the ones with most wins were Retegi II and Errandonea with 3 wins.

== Awards ==
The winners are awarded with a Txapela and a trophy (the winner are denomined Txapelduns).

=== Championships ===
Year	Champions	Subchampions	Score	Fronton
1941	Onaindia - Urcelay	Txikito de Iraeta - Gallastegui	22-18 (1)	Gros
1943	Onaindia - Urcelay	Ubilla I - Kortabitarte	22-21	
1945	Txikito de Iraeta (2) - Lazcano	Atano VII - Atano IV	22-21	
1961	Arriarán I - Arriarán II	Ogueta - Etxabe X	22-15	
1978	Pierola II - Maiz II	Retegui I - Aldazabal II	22-14	Anoeta
1979	Bengoetxea III - Gorostiza	Pierola II - Maiz II	22-15	Anoeta
1980–81	García Ariño IV - Maiz II	Vergara II - Martinikorena	22-13	Anoeta
1981–82	Beristain - Tolosa	García Ariño IV - Maiz II	22-21	Anoeta
1982–83	Bengoetxea IV - Maiz II	García Ariño IV - Gorostiza	22-11	Anoeta
1983–84	Bengoetxea IV - Maiz II	Oreja III - Aldeazabal II	22-18	Anoeta
1984–85	Vergara II - Martinikorena	Oreja III - Galarza III	22-18	Anoeta
1985–86	Vergara II - Martinikorena	Alustiza - Tolosa	22-15	Anoeta
1986–87	Ladutxe - Tolosa	Alustiza - Galarza III	22-14	Anoeta
1987–88	Retegi II - Errandonea	Ladutxe - Martinikorena	22-16	Anoeta
1988–89	Ladutxe - Tolosa	Retegi II - Arretxe	22-18	Anoeta
1989–90	Retegi II - Errandonea	Vergara II - Etxenagusia (3)	22-3	Anoeta
1990–91	Retegi II - Arretxe	Salaberria - Galarza III	22-19	Anoeta
1991–92	Vergara II - Arretxe	Unanue - Zezeaga	22-18	Ogueta
1992–93	Alustiza - Maiz II y Etxaniz - Zezeaga	Titín III - Arretxe y Urioraguena - Galarza III	22-20 y 22-15	Ogueta
1993–94	Titin III - Arretxe	Retegi II - Beloki	22-14	Ogueta
1994–95	Retegi II - Errandonea	Unanue - Zezeaga	22-17	Atano III
1995–96	Capellán - Beloki	Etxaniz - Arretxe	22-18	Atano III
1996–97	Retegi II - Lasa III	Eugi - Zezeaga	22-14	Atano III
1997–98	Unanue - Errasti	Etxaniz - Elkoro	22-21	Atano III
1999	Nagore - Errandonea y Olaizola I - Elkoro	Berasaluze VIII - Beloki y Goñi II - Zezeaga	22-17 y 22-15	Atano III and Adarraga
2000	Titin III - Lasa III	Unanue - Errasti	22-19	Ogueta
2001	Olaizola I - Goñi III	Alustiza - Beloki	22-13	Atano III
2002	Xala - Lasa III	Olaizola I - Patxi Ruiz	22-19	Atano III
2003	Koka - Beloki	Olaizola II - Pascual	22-15	Atano III
2004	Titín III - Goñi III	Martínez de Irujo - Lasa III	22-8	Atano III
2005	Martínez de Irujo - Goñi III	Bengoetxea VI - Beloki	22-12	Atano III
2006	Martínez de Irujo - Martínez de Eulate	Olaizola II - Zearra	22-11	Ogueta
2007	Xala - Martínez de Eulate	Olaizola I - Beloki	22-18	Ogueta
2008	Olaizola II - Mendizabal II	Titín III - Laskurain	22-17	Ogueta
2009	Martínez de Irujo - Goñi III	Olaizola II - Mendizabal II	22-21	Atano III
2010	Xala - Zubieta	Sébastian Gonzalez - Aritz Laskurain	22-14	Ogueta
2011	Olaizola II - Begino	Xala - Beroitz	22-14	Bizkaia
2012	Titin III - Merino II	Xala - Laskurain	22-15	Bizkaia
2013	Martínez de Irujo - Zabaleta	Berasaluze II - Albisu	6-4	Atano III
2014	Martínez de Irujo - Barriola	Olaizola II - Aretxabaleta	22-13	Bizkaia
2015	Bengoetxea VI - Untoria	Berasaluze II - Zubieta	22-7	Bizkaia
2016	Olaizola II - Mikel Urrutikoetxea	Juan Martínez de Irujo - Rezusta	16-10	Bizkaia
2017	Irribarria - Rezusta	Bengoetxea VI - Larunbe	22-14	Bizkaia
2018	Ezkurdia - Zabaleta	Elezkano II - Rezusta	22-9	Bizkaia
2019	Elezkano II - Rezusta	Irribarria - Zabaleta	22-19	Bizkaia
2020	Ezkurdia - Martija	Olaizola II - Urrutikoetxea	22-13	Bizkaia
2021	Elezkano II - Zabaleta	Peña II - Albisu	22-7	Bizkaia
2022	Altuna III - Martija	Laso - Imaz	22-20	Bizkaia
2023	Elordi - Zabaleta	Laso - Imaz	22-13	Navarra Arena

=== Pelotaris ===
Pelotari	Txapelas	Finals
Retegi II	5	7
Maiz II	5	7
Martínez de Irujo	5	7
Titín III	4	6
Errandonea	4	4
Goñi III	4	4
Olaizola II	3	8
Arretxe	3	6
Bergara II	3	5
Xala	3	5
Tolosa	3	4
Lasa III	3	4
Zabaleta	4	5
Beloki	2	7
Martinikorena	2	4
Olaizola I	2	4
Rezusta	2	4
Ladutxe	2	3
Elezkano II	2	3
Onaindia	2	2
Urcelay	2	2
Bengoetxea IV	2	2
Martínez de Eulate	2	2
Martija	2	2
Ezkurdia	2	1
Zezeaga	1	5
Alustiza	1	4
Unanue	1	4
Garcia Ariño IV	1	3
Etxaniz	1	3
Bengoetxea VI	1	3
Txikito de Iraeta	1	2
Pierola II	1	2
Elkoro	1	2
Errasti	1	2
Gorostiza	1	2
Mendizabal II	1	2
Barriola	1	2
Zubieta	1	2
Irribarria	1	2
Urrutikoetxea	1	2
Lazcano	1	1
Arriarán I	1	1
Arriarán II	1	1
Begino	1	1
Bengoetxea III	1	1
Beristain	1	1
Capellán	1	1
Nagore	1	1
Koka	1	1
Untoria	1	1
Martija	1	1
Galarza III	0	4
Laskurain	0	3
Berasaluze VIII	0	3
Aldazabal II	0	2
Oreja III	0	2
Albisu	0	2
Laso	0	2
Imaz	0	2
Gallastegui	0	1
Ubilla I	0	1
Kortabitarte	0	1
Atano VII	0	1
Atano IV	0	1
Ogueta	0	1
Etxabe X	0	1
Retegi I	0	1
Etxenagusia	0	1
Salaberria	0	1
Eugi	0	1
Goñi II	0	1
Zearra	0	1
Patxi Ruiz	0	1
Pascual	0	1
Gonzalez	0	1
Beroitz	0	1
Aretxabaleta	0	1
Larunbe	0	1
Peña II	0	1

At the same time, the 2nd Hand-Pelota doubles championship is played by minor importance or rookie pelotaris giving the right to the winning partners to play in the 1st category tournament next year.
