= Spanish Federation of Basque Pelota =

Federación Española de Pelota
- Sport: Basque pelota
- Category: Professional Men (1st and 2nd); Professional Women (1st and 2nd); Amateur (Men and Women)
- Jurisdiction: Spain
- Abbreviation: FEP
- Founded: 1925
- Regional affiliation: Álava, Aragón, Castile, Cataluña, Guipúzcoa, Navarra, Salamanca, Vizcaya (originals). Rest of Spain.
- Headquarters: Sagasta, 13. 7th floor, Madrid, Spain
- President: Julián García Angulo
- Chairman: José Manuel Molinero Sánchez
- CEO: Ramón A. Martínez Asensio
- Secretary: Paloma Hernandorena Salvate
- Coach: Baldomero Peralta San Martín
- Sponsor: Halcón Viajes, Rasán, Duar.

Official website
- www.fepelota.es
- (Spain)

The Federación Española de Pelota (English: Spanish Federation of Basque pelota) is the main governing body of Basque pelota in Spain and one of the most important in the world along with the International Federation of Basque Pelota. As of 2023, the federation has 326 registered clubs and 9,939 federated pelota players.

== History ==
Basque pelota first gained popularity during the 1920s. Several tournaments were organized and the Hand-pelota, remonte and pala championships were introduced for the first professional pelotaris.

In 1924 Basque pelota was introduced as a demonstration sport in the 1924 Summer Olympics, and the popularity of the event was the main reason for the creation of the Spanish Basque Pelota Federation.

The first typed of pelota to be included were doubles hand-pelota, pala, remonte and cesta punta. Provincial federations were set up in Álava, Aragón, Castile, Cataluña, Guipúzcoa, Navarra, Salamanca and Vizcaya.

The activities of the Federation were interrupted during the Civil War but were restarted in 1940, when singles hand-pelota and short pala categories were introduced. The same year the first top-tier hand-pelota singles championship was organized, resulting in the win of Atano III over Txikito de Iraeta with a final score of 22-8.

In 1941 the first top-tier hand-pelota doubles championship was played, resulting in the win of Onaindia and Urcelay over Txikito de Iraeta and Gallastegui with a final score of 22-18. And in 1957 the first second-tier hand-pelota 2nd category singles was played resulting in the win of Del Val over Otxoa with a final score of 22-8.

During the 1960s, several new competitions were introduced. Most were regional, second category and youth tournaments.

In 1989, the Cuatro y Medio Euskadi Championship was introduced, resulting in a win for Retegi II over Galarza III with a final score of 22-6.

== Competitions ==
The pelotaris in the federation are mainly under contract of the two major Basque pelota companies operating in Spain, focus in the Basque Country, Asegarce and ASPE.

=== Categories regulated by the Federation ===
- Hand-Pelota Singles
- Hand-Pelota Doubles
- Long Pala
- Short Pala
- Frontennis
- Share
- Cesta Punta

=== Main tournaments held by the federation ===
- 1st Hand-Pelota singles championship
- 1st Hand-Pelota doubles championship
- 2nd Hand-Pelota singles championship
- Cuatro y Medio Euskadi Championship
