= Fernando Arretxe =

Basque pelotari

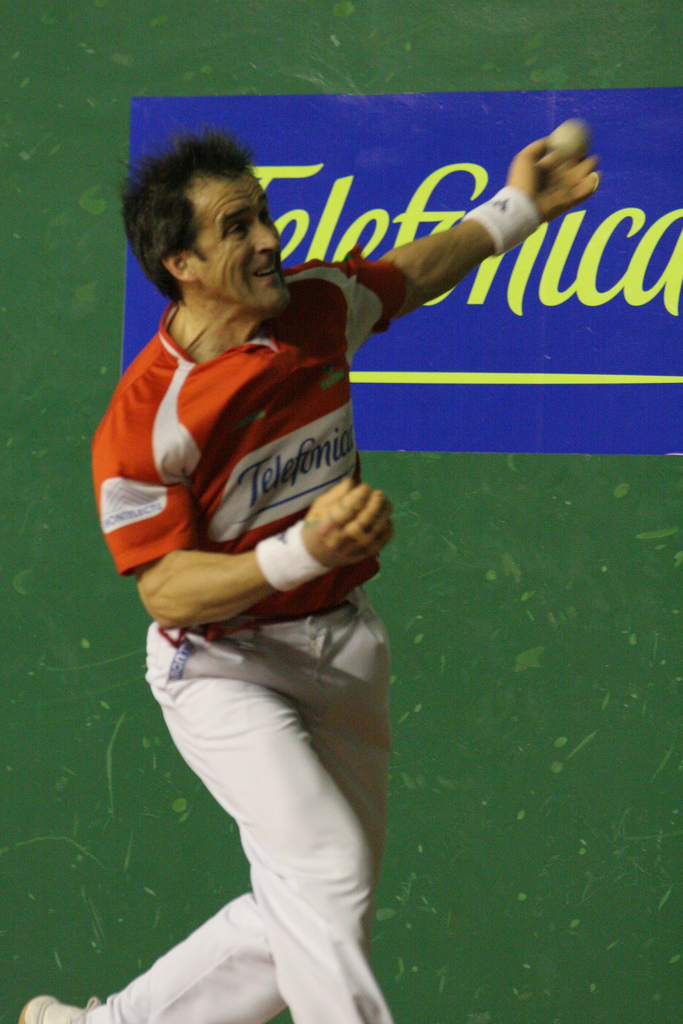
Fernando Arretxe Caminondo

Fernando Arretxe Caminondo, also known as Arretxe I (born in Valcarlos, Navarre, Spain on August 19, 1961) is an ex-player of Basque pelota. He played as back-player.

He started his professional career as a pelotari in 1981, at Pamplona. He has won several trophies and has been in several pelota companies such as Eskulari, Reur, Asegarce and Frontis, where he is now.

He has a son, Iker Arretxe (Arretxe II), who debuted in 2005.

== Manomanista de Primera ==
Year	Champion	Subchampion	Scoreboard	Fronton
1994	Arretxe	Errandonea	22-12	Ogueta
1996	Eugi	Arretxe	22-19	Atano III
1997	Arretxe	Elkoro	22-18	Atano III
1999	Beloki	Arretxe	22-9	Atano III

== Mano Parejas ==
Year	Champion	Subchampion	Scoreboard	Fronton
1988–89	Ladutxe - Tolosa	Retegi II - Arretxe	22-18	Anoeta
1990–91	Retegi II - Arretxe	Salaberria - Galarza III	22-19	Anoeta
1991–92	Vergara II - Arretxe	Unanue - Zezeaga	22-18	Ogueta
1992–93	Alustiza - Maiz II	Titín III - Arretxe	22-20	Ogueta
1993–94	Titin III - Arretxe	Retegi II - Beloki	22-14	Ogueta
1995–96	Capellán - Beloki	Etxaniz - Arretxe	22-18	Atano III

== Cuatro y Medio ==
Year	Champion	Subchampion	Scoreboard	Fronton
1996	Arretxe	Nagore	22-08	Ogueta
