= Bare-handed Pelota First League =

The Bare-handed Pelota First League (Campeonato Manomanista) is the most important tournament competition of Hand-pelota category of Basque pelota. It was created in 1940, when the new Basque Pelota Spanish Federation, to have a champion of the category. In its beginnings, the championship was disputed every two years, turning into an annual tournament since 1950. The first champion was Atano III. Retegi II, holds the title of most wins with 11, 9 consecutives.

Until 1995 the competition system was stair, the winner of the past year was directly qualified to final and following him the other players in its last year respective positions, always maintaining the position earned in the last tournament. From 1995 to present, the system had several modifications that make it similar to a tennis tournament. In the current competitions four semifinalists of last year are directly qualified to quarter finals. The winner is awarded with a txapela as a symboland a trophy.

Since 1957 its disputed also the Bare-handed Pelota Second League, for debutant and minor level pelotaris, that doesn't reach the level of professional pelota players, that consists of 2 or 3 games, played on weekends and holidays in frontons. the 2nd Hand-Pelota champion is allowed to participate in the next edition of 1st Hand-Pelota.

== Championships ==
Year	Champion	Subchampion	Score	Fronton
1940	Atano III	Txikito de Iraeta	22–08	Gros
1942	Atano III	Atano VII	22–05	Gros
1944	Atano III	Felipe (1)	22–08	Deportivo
1946	Atano III	Akarregi	22–16	Astelena
1948	Gallastegui	Atano III	22–06	Bergara
1950	Gallastegui	Akarregi	22–15	Astelena
1951	Gallastegui	Akarregi	22–14	Bergara
1953	Barberito I	Gallastegui (2)		
1954	Soroa II	Barberito I	22–04	Astelena
1955	Arriaran II	Soroa II	22–13	Astelena
1956	Arriaran II	Garcia Ariño I	22–13	Astelena
1957	García Ariño I	Arriaran II	22–11	Deportivo
1958	Ogueta	Arriaran II	22–07	Beotibar
1959	Ogueta	García Ariño I	22–13	Bergara
1960	Azkarate	Ogueta	22–19	Astelena
1961	Azkarate	Etxabe X	22–07	Bergara
1962	Azkarate	García Ariño I	22–21	Vitoriano
1963	García Ariño I	Azkarate	22–02	Beotibar
1964	Azkarate	García Ariño I	22–14	Anoeta
1965	Azkarate	Atano X	22–17	Anoeta
1966	Atano X	Azkarate	22–13	Astelena
1967	Azkarate	Atano X	22–18	Anoeta
1968	Atano X	Azkarate	22–17	Anoeta
1969	Retegi I	Atano X	22–08	Municipal Bergara fronton
1970	Retegi I	Lajos	22–12	Anoeta
1971	Lajos	Retegi I	22–17	Anoeta
1972	Retegi I	Lajos (3)		
1973	Retegi I	Tapia I	22–20	Astelena
1974	Retegi I	Gorostiza	22–21	Anoeta
1975	Retegi I	Lajos	22–14	Anoeta
1976	Lajos	Retegi I (4)		
1977	Gorostiza	García Ariño IV	22–12	Anoeta
1978	Bengoetxea III	García Ariño IV	22–13	Anoeta
1979	Bengoetxea III	García Ariño IV	22–10	Ogueta
1980	Retegi II	Maiz II	22–14	Anoeta
1981	Retegi II	García Ariño IV	22–11	Anoeta
1982	Retegi II	García Ariño IV	22–09	Anoeta
1983	Retegi II	Galarza III	22–16	Anoeta
1984	Retegi II	Galarza III	22–21	Anoeta
1985	Retegi II	Galarza III	22–13	Anoeta
1986	Retegi II	Tolosa	22–12	Anoeta
1987	Retegi II	Tolosa	22–16	Anoeta
1988	Retegi II	Galarza III	22–09	Anoeta
1989	Tolosa	Retegi II	22–19	Anoeta
1990	Retegi II	Tolosa	22–08	Anoeta
1991	Galarza III	Retegi II	22–15	Anoeta
1992	Galarza III	Retegi II	22–12	Anoeta
1993	Retegi II	Galarza III	22–19	Anoeta
1994	Arretxe	Errandonea	22–12	Ogueta
1995	Beloki	Errandonea	22–15	Atano III
1996	Eugi	Arretxe	22–19	Atano III
1997	Arretxe	Elkoro	22–18	Atano III
1998	Beloki	Eugi	22–13	Atano III
1999	Beloki and Eugi	Arretxe and Elkoro	22–09 and 22–11	Atano III and Astelena
2000	Eugi	Beloki	22–13	Atano III
2001	Beloki	Eugi	22–08	Atano III
2002	Barriola	Beloki	22–03	Atano III
2003	Patxi Ruiz	Olaizola II	22–07	Atano III
2004	Martínez de Irujo	Xala	22–12	Atano III
2005	Olaizola II	Martínez de Irujo	22–18	Atano III
2006	Martínez de Irujo	Olaizola II	22–17	Atano III
2007	Olaizola II	Barriola	22–10	Atano III
2008	Bengoetxea VI	Barriola	22–11	Atano III
2009	Martínez de Irujo	Olaizola II	22–12	Atano III
2010	Martínez de Irujo	Xala	22–13	Ogueta
2011	Xala	Olaizola II	22–19	Bizkaia
2012	Olaizola II	Martínez de Irujo	22–07	Bizkaia
2013	Olaizola II	Martínez de Irujo	22–07	Bizkaia
2014	Martínez de Irujo	Retegi Bi	22–09	Atano III
2015	Urrutikoetxea	Olaizola II	22–19	Bizkaia
2016	Irribarria	Urrutikoetxea	22–13	Bizkaia
2017	Bengoetxea VI	Irribarria	22–18	Bizkaia
2018	Altuna III	Olaizola II	22–14	Bizkaia
2019	Irribarria	Urrutikoetxea	22–20	Bizkaia
2020	Jaka	Altuna III	22–20	Bizkaia
2021	Altuna III	Rezusta	22–05	Bizkaia
2022	Laso	Ezkurdia	22–07	Navarra Arena

== Winner pelotaris ==
Pelotari	Txapela	Finals
Retegi II	11	14
Azkarate	6	9
Retegi I	6	8
Martínez de Irujo	5	8
Olaizola II	4	10
Beloki	4	6
Atano III	4	5
Eugi	3	5
Gallastegui	3	4
Bengoetxea VI	2	2
Galarza III	2	7
Garcia Ariño I	2	6
Atano X	2	5
Lajos	2	5
Arretxe	2	4
Arriarran II	2	4
Ogueta	2	3
Irribarria	2	3
Altuna III	2	3
Bengoetxea III	2	2
Tolosa	1	4
Barriola	1	3
Xala	1	3
Urrutikoetxea	1	3
Gorostiza	1	2
Soroa II	1	2
Barberito I	1	2
Patxi Ruiz	1	1
Erik Jaka	1	1
Unai Laso	1	1
Garcia Ariño IV	0	5
Akarregui	0	3
Errandonea	0	2
Elkoro	0	2
Maiz II	0	1
Tapia I	0	1
Etxabe X	0	1
Felipe	0	1
Atano VII	0	1
Txikito de Iraeta	0	1
Retegi Bi	0	1
Beñat Rezusta	0	1
Joseba Ezkurdia	0	1

== See also ==
- Bare-handed Pelota Second League
