= Cuatro y Medio Euskadi Championship =

The Cuatro y Medio Euskadi Championship is an individual championship of Basque pelota. Cuatro y Medio means Four and a half. The rules state that every ball that rebounds too far from that mark is considered failed.

Cuatro y Medio is also where most famous Pelotaris such as Titín III Played.

== Championships ==
Year	Champion	Subchampion	Score	Fronton
1989	Retegi II	Galarza III	22-06	Anoeta
1990	Retegi II	Galarza III	22-15	Anoeta
1991	Retegi II	Eugi	22-07	Ogueta
1992	Eugi	Errasti	22-12	Astelena
1993	Galarza III	Eugi	22-07	Bergara
1994	Eugi	Errandonea	22-13	Ogueta
1995	Nagore	Unanue	22-18	Ogueta
1996	Arretxe	Nagore	22-08	Ogueta
1997	Retegi II	Titín III	22-21	Ogueta
1998	Nagore	Eugi	22-11	Ogueta
1999	Unanue	Eugi	22-11	Ogueta
2000	Eugi	Nagore	22-05	Labrit
2001	Barriola	Eugi	22-10	Ogueta
2002	Olaizola II	Barriola	22-13	Ogueta
2003	Nagore	Titín III	22-15	Ogueta
2004	Olaizola II	Barriola	22-08	Ogueta
2005	Olaizola II	Xala	22-05	Atano III
2006	Martínez de Irujo	Barriola	22-21	Ogueta
2007	Titín III	Barriola	22-15	Ogueta
2008	Olaizola II	Martínez de Irujo	22-17	Atano III
2009	Gonzalez	Martínez de Irujo	22-18	Atano III
2010	Martínez de Irujo	Barriola	22-17	Atano III
2011	Olaizola II	Martínez de Irujo	22-12	Bizkaia
2012	Olaizola II	Bengoetxea VI	22-9	Ogueta
2013	Olaizola II	Martínez de Irujo	22-16	Ogueta
2014	Martínez de Irujo	Olaizola II	22-17	Bizkaia
2015	Urrutikoetxea	Martínez de Irujo	22-20	Bizkaia
2016	Bengoetxea VI	Altuna III	22-21	Ogueta
2017	Altuna III	Urrutikoetxea	22-21	Bizkaia
2018	Ezkurdia	Altuna III	22-17	Navarra Arena
2019	Ezkurdia	Altuna III	22-16	Navarra Arena
2020	Altuna III	Jaka	22-9	Bizkaia
2021	Altuna III	Laso	22-20	Bizkaia
2022	Ezkurdia	Altuna III	22-21	Bizkaia

== Pelotaris ==
Pelotari	Txapelas	Finals
Olaizola II	7	8
Retegi II	4	4
Eugi	3	8
Altuna III	3	6
Nagore	3	5
Barriola	1	6
Galarza III	1	3
Titín III	1	3
Martínez de Irujo	3	8
Ezkurdia	3	3
Unanue	1	2
Arretxe	1	1
Bengoetxea VI	1	1
Gonzalez	1	1
Urrutikoetxea	1	1
Errandonea	0	1
Errasti	0	1
Xala	0	1
Laso	0	1
