= Bare-handed Pelota Second League =

The Bare-handed Pelota Second League is the second most important hand-pelota tournament. The championship has been played since 1957, and has been the previous scenario for future the 1st category pelotaris such as Retegi I, Retegi II, Arretxe, Beloki I and Olaizola II. The winner of the tournament earns the right to participate in the next edition of the Bare-handed Pelota First League

== Championships ==
Year	Champion	Subchampion	Score	Fronton
1957	Del Val	Otxoa	22-08	Vitoriano
1958	García Ariño II	Azkarate	22-20	Deportivo
1959	Arkaia	Elgea	22-11	Deportivo
1960	Lejarazu	Atano X	22-09	Deportivo
1961	Atano X	Elgea	22-20	Astelena
1962	García Ariño II	Elgea	22-17	Beotibar
1963	Elgea	Vergara I	22-14	Astelena
1964	Tapia I	Pascual	22-16	Bergara
1965	Vergara I	Andueza III	22-17	Beotibar
1966	Andueza III	Retegi I	22-05	Anoeta
1967	Retegi I	Lajos	22-14	Bergara
1968	Elorza	Del Val II	22-12	Astelena
1969	Nalda II	Madrid	22-18	Adarraga
1970	Oreja II	Del Val II	22-16	Beotibar
1971	Erostarbe	Arruabarrena	22-10	Beotibar
1972	Arruabarrena	Arozena	22-19	Bergara
1973	Gorostiza	Guereñu	22-03	Vitoriano
1974	Beristain	Chichan	22-21	Labrit
1975	Retegi II	García Ariño IV	22-10	Anoeta
1976	Maiz II	Salbidea	22-14	Anoeta
1977	Unsain	Alberdi	22-18	Anoeta
1978	Txoperena	Urkiza	22-18	Anoeta
1979	Andueza VI	Arcelus	22-12	Anoeta
1980	Herran	Txoperena	22-02	Anoeta
1981	Luke	Urkiri	22-16	Anoeta
1982	Retegi IV	Urkiri	22-17	Anoeta
1983	Esnaola	Alustiza	22-07	Anoeta
1984	Alustiza	Urra	22-08	Anoeta
1985	Etxenagusia	Soroa III	22-03	Anoeta
1986	Arretxe	Urzainki	22-12	Anoeta
1987	Urra	Errasti	22-16	Anoeta
1988	Ansotegi	Murga	22-16	Anoeta
1989	Urzainki	Soroa III	22-20	Anoeta
1990	Soroa III	Errasti	22-17	Anoeta
1991	Errasti	Muntion	22-08	Anoeta
1992	Irazola	Urra	22-21	Anoeta
1993	Beloki I	Irazola	22-10	Anoeta
1994	Santi	Armendariz	22-10	Deportivo
1995	Lasa III	Ariznabarreta	22-20	Ogueta
1996	Lasa III	Ariznabarreta	22-04	Ogueta
1997	Koka	Goñi II	22-20	Atano III
1998	Esain and Zearra	Badiola III and Minguez	22-10 and 22-06	Labrit and Donibane
1999	Rai and Olaizola II	Barriola and Hirigoyen	22-08 and 22-16	Bergara and Astelena
2000	González	Imaz	22-15	Atano III
2001	Berraondo	Xala	22-16	Atano III
2002	Pascual	Apeztegia	22-18	Atano III
2003	Peñagarikano	Berraondo	22-09	Atano III
2004	Galarza V	Berraondo	22-12	Labrit
2005	Leiza	Galarza VI	22-08	Amorebieta IV
2006	Berasaluze IX	Arretxe II	22-21	Labrit
2007	Urberuaga	Galarza VI	22-14	Amorebieta IV
2008	Retegi Bi	Larralde	22-09	Amorebieta IV
2009	Beroiz	Argote	22-13	Beotibar
2010	Aritz Lasa	Beroiz	22-15	Beotibar
2011	Olaetxea	Merino	22-18	Adarraga
2012	Jaunarena	Ezkurdia	22-16	Labrit
2013	Untoria	Elezkano II	22-15	Labrit
2014	Rezusta	Zabala	22-10	Beotibar
2015	Víctor	Irribarria	22-17	Beotibar
2016	Mendizabal III	Gorka	22-14	Labrit
2017	Arteaga II	Bakaikoa	22-18	abrit
2018	Bakaikoa	Erasun	22-18	Labrit
2019	Darío	Elordi	22-12	Labrit
2020	Arteaga II	Elordi	22-12	Beotibar
2021	P. Etxeberria	Egiguren V	22-7	Labrit
2022	Alberdi	Salaberria	22-10	Labrit
2023	Bakaikoa	Salaberria	22-20	Labrit
2024	Larrazabal	Agirre	22-21	Labrit

== See also ==
- Bare-handed Pelota First League
