= Oier Zearra =

Spanish pelotari and politician (born 1977)

Oier Zearra Garabieta, also known as Zearra (born in Galdakao, Biscay on January 12, 1977), is a Basque pelota player for the Asegarce company. He plays as back-player.

== Professional career ==
He debuted at the Astelena fronton (Eibar) on June 22 of 1997. His main achievement has been the subchampionship in the 2006 1st Hand-Pelota doubles championship, along with Olaizola II.

=== 1st Hand-Pelota doubles championships ===
Year	Champions	Subchampions	Score	Fronton
2006	Martínez de Irujo - Martínez de Eulate	Olaizola II - Zearra	22-11	Ogueta

=== 2nd Hand-Pelota singles championship ===
Year	Champion	Subchampion	Score	Fronton
1998 (1)	Zearra	Minguez	22-06	Donibane

(1) Two championships were played in 1999, due to disagreements between the two main professional Basque-pelota companies—Aspe and Asegarce.

=== 2nd Hand-Pelota doubles championships ===
Year	Champions	Subchampions	Score	Fronton
1998	Zearra		22-	

== Sources & references ==
- (in Basque) Oier Zearra profile
