= Joseba Ezkurdia =

Spanish pelotari

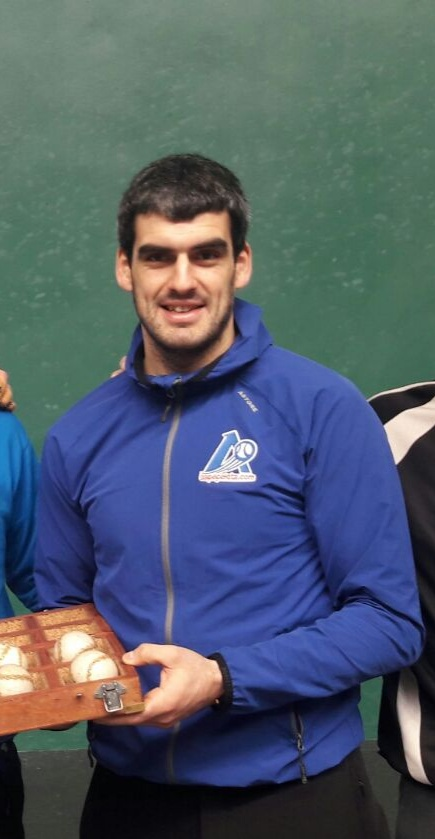
- Joseba Ezkurdia in 2018.

Personal information
- Full name: Joseba Ezkurdia Galarraga
- Nickname: Ezkurdia
- Born: 22 April 1991 (age 35) Arbizu, Navarre
- Height: 1.90 m (6 ft 3 in)
- Weight: 93 kg (205 lb)

Sport
- Country: Spain
- Sport: Basque pelota

Joseba Ezkurdia Galarraga, known professionally as Ezkurdia, is a Basque pelota forward player. He is a three-time champion of the Cuatro y Medio Euskadi Championship (2018, 2019 and 2022), and also of the Bare-handed Pelota First League Doubles (2018, 2020 and 2025).

== Professional career ==
Ezkurdia made his professional debut on 28 December 2011 on the Beotibar fronton, from Tolosa, Spain. He lost the game along with Íñigo Pascual to Mikel Idoate and Miguel Merino Soto (Merino I) for a final score of 21-22. The match was part of the Bare-handed Pelota Second League Doubles.

He continued to progress in his career until the 2018 season, in which he achieved a double by winning the txapela of the Bare-handed Pelota First League Doubles with José Javier Zabaleta; and the Cuatro y Medio Euskadi Championship, whose final was played for the first time in the new Navarra Arena.

The following season, 2019, he won the Cuatro y Medio Euskadi Championship again in the same venue and against the same opponent, Jokin Altuna (Altuna III).

In the 2020 season, he won the Bare-handed Pelota First League Doubles with Julen Martija, but in the Cuatro y Medio Euskadi Championship he lost in the semi-finals against Erik Jaka.

In the 2021 season, he was left out of the competition in both tournaments in which he was already a two-time champion.

The following season, he won the Cuatro y Medio Euskadi Championship for a third time (again against Altuna III), and he managed to reach the final of the Bare-handed Pelota First League, which he lost against Unai Laso.

He did not win another championship until the 2025 Bare-handed Pelota First League Doubles with Beñat Rezusta.
