= Atano III fronton =

Basque pelota short

Atano III
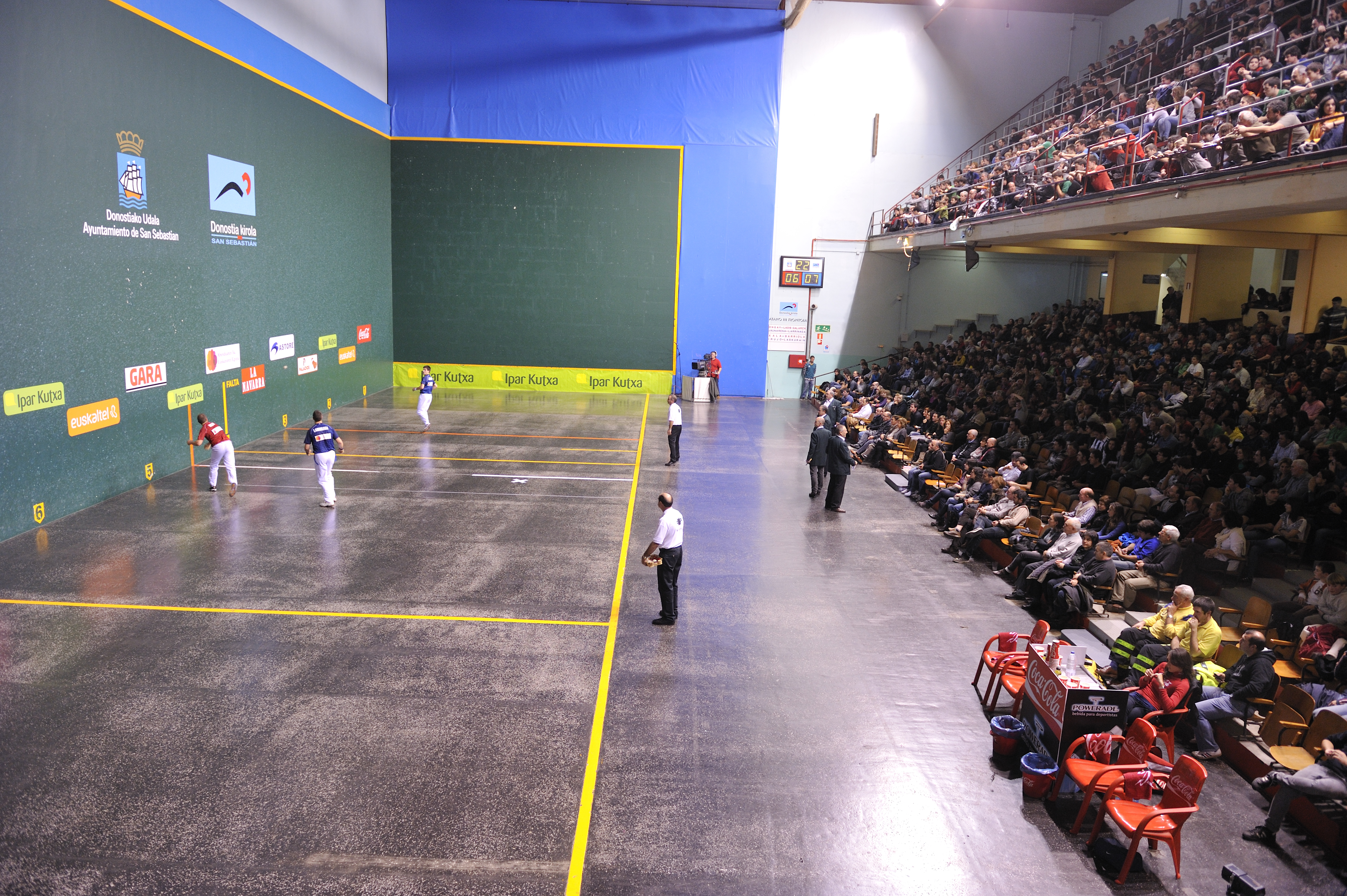
- Interactive map of Atano III
- Full name: Atano III.a pilotalekua / Frontón Atano III
- Former names: Anoeta pilotalekua / Frontón Anoeta
- Location: 6 Anoeta pasealekua, San Sebastián, Gipuzkoa, Basque Autonomous Community, Spain
- Coordinates: 43°18′1.77″N 1°58′12.28″W
- Owner: San Sebastián municipality
- Capacity: 1944
- Field size: 35 m (length) x 10 (width) x 14 m (height)

Construction
- Groundbreaking: 1962
- Opened: 17 July 1963
- Renovated: 1995

Atano III is a Basque pelota short fronton located at the Anoeta Sports Complex in San Sebastián, Basque Autonomous Community, Spain.

== History ==
The fronton was built in 1963 by the municipality, due to the high demand by the professional and aficionate players of the Gipuzkoa province, originally named Anoeta fronton. In 1995, after repair and maintenance work the fronton was renamed after Mariano Juaristi Mendizábal who played with the pseudonym of "Atano III", often considered one of the best pelotaris of all time.

== Modalities ==
The main modalities played in the Atano III fronton are Hand-pelota and Paleta-rubber. Atano III is one of the frontons which held one of the most important yearly competitions in the sport, the 1st Hand-Pelota Championship, with 40 finals played there until the current date.

== Events ==
These are the most notable events held in the Atano III since the name change in 1995.

=== 1st Hand-pelota category Championship finals ===
- Total: 16

Year	Champion	Subchampion	Score
1995	Beloki	Errandonea	22–15
1996	Eugi	Arretxe	22–19
1997	Arretxe	Elkoro	22–18
1998	Beloki	Eugi	22–13
1999*	Beloki	Arretxe	22–09
2000	Eugi	Beloki	22–13
2001	Beloki	Eugi	22–08
2002	Barriola	Beloki	22–03
2003	Patxi Ruiz	Olaizola II	22–07
2004	Martínez de Irujo	Xala	22–12
2005	Olaizola II	Martínez de Irujo	22–18
2006	Martínez de Irujo	Olaizola II	22–17
2007	Olaizola II	Barriola	22–10
2008	Bengoetxea VI	Barriola	22–11
2009	Martínez de Irujo	Olaizola II	22–12
2014	Martínez de Irujo	Retegi Bi	22–09

* In 1999, two separate finals were played, due to a disagreement between the two organising companies, Asegarce and Aspe: the Aspe final was played in the Atano III (as listed above), and the Asegarce one in the Astelena (won by Eugi over Elkoro, 22–11).

=== 2nd Hand Pelota category Championship finals ===
- Total: 4

Year	Champion	Subchampion	Score
1997	Koka	Goñi II	22–20
2000	González	Imaz	22–15
2001	Berraondo	Xala	22–16
2002	Pascual	Apeztegia	22–18

=== Doubles-Pelota Championship finals ===
- Total: 11

Year	Champions	Subchampions	Score
1994–95	Retegi II - Errandonea	Unanue - Zezeaga	22–17
1995–96	Capellán - Beloki	Etxaniz - Arretxe	22–18
1996–97	Retegi II - Lasa III	Eugi - Zezeaga	22–14
1997–98	Unanue - Errasti	Etxaniz - Elkoro	22-21
1999	Nagore - Errandonea y Olaizola I - Elkoro	Berasaluze VIII - Beloki y Goñi II - Zezeaga	22–17 y 22–15
2001	Olaizola I - Goñi III	Alustiza - Beloki	22–13
2002	Xala - Lasa III	Olaizola I - Patxi Ruiz	22–19
2003	Koka - Beloki	Olaizola II - Pascual	22–15
2004	Titín III - Goñi III	Martínez de Irujo - Lasa III	22–8
2005	Martínez de Irujo - Goñi III	Bengoetxea VI - Beloki	22–12
2009	Juan Martínez de Irujo - Goñi III	Olaizola II - Mendizabal II	22-21

=== Cuatro y Medio Championship finals ===
- Total: 2

Year	Champion	Subchampion	Score
2005	Olaizola II	Xala	22–05
2008	Olaizola II	Martínez de Irujo	22–17
