= Julián Retegi =

Spanish Basque pelota player

Personal information
- Full name: Julián Retegui Barbería
- Nickname: Retegui II
- Born: 10 October 1954 (age 71) Erasun, Navarra
- Years active: 1974-2001

Sport
- Country: Spain
- Sport: Basque pelota
- Position: Forward

Julián Retegui Barbería, also known as Retegi II (born in Eratsun, Navarre, Spain on October 10, 1954) is an ex-player of Basque pelota. He is also called "El mago de Eratsun" (Spanish: "The wizard of Eratsun"), since he is considered one of the best Basque pelota players of all time. He played as a foreplayer.

Nephew of Juan Ignacio Retegi (another pelotari who won the pelota championship six times, usually known as Retegi I), he started to get interested in the Basque pelota when he was a child. He worked as a stonecutter and in the wood industry. On July 14, 1974 he started his professional career as a pelotari in the Cinema frontón of Zarautz (Gipuzkoa), having as a partner another pelotari, Juaristi. They were defeated by Azorena and Etxeandia by 22-21. One year later, in 1975, he won his first championship, the 2nd Hand-Pelota singles championship.

He has been the pelotari who has singlehandedly won the 1st Hand-Pelota singles championship more times than any other player. He has won a total of eleven times: every year from 1980 to 1988 and in 1990 and 1993. He has also won the Spanish Championship in pairs: in 1988, 1990, 1991, 1995 and in 1997. On December 13, 1997 he won his last prize, the Basque Championship of 4½ against Titin III in the Ogueta fronton of Gasteiz. Since then, due to his regular lesions, he didn't win more prizes. He played his last match on September 20, 2001, in the Adarraga frontón, Logroño, with Barriola against Olaizola II and Armendariz. He lost 18-22. In total, he has won 22 prizes, being the pelotari who has won the most prizes in the history of Basque pelota and has played around 1,407 matches, 843 of which he won.

For some years now he has been working in Asegarce, the company in which Karlos Arguiñano is a partner. His son, Julen Retegi, is also a pelotari. He debuted in the same town his father did, Zarauz, but in a different frontón called Aritzbatalde in July 2005. He wears the name Retegi Bi in honour of his father (Bi means two in Basque, the number Julián wore), although the name should have been Retegi VIII due to their dynasty as pelotaris.

== Championships ==
=== 1st Hand-pelota singles championship ===
Retegi participated for the first time in this championship in 1979, but he didn't win. One year later he arrived at the finals and won against Maiz II. From that day on he started his brilliant career, getting to the finals from 1980 to 1993, and winning the championship eleven times.

Year	Champion	Subchampion	Score	Fronton
1980	Retegi II	Maiz II	22-14	Anoeta
1981	Retegi II	García Ariño IV	22-11	Anoeta
1982	Retegi II	García Ariño IV	22-09	Anoeta
1983	Retegi II	Galarza III	22-16	Anoeta
1984	Retegi II	Galarza III	22-21	Anoeta
1985	Retegi II	Galarza III	22-13	Anoeta
1986	Retegi II	Tolosa	22-12	Anoeta
1987	Retegi II	Tolosa	22-16	Anoeta
1988	Retegi II	Galarza III	22-09	Anoeta
1989	Tolosa	Retegi II	22-19	Anoeta
1990	Retegi II	Tolosa	22-08	Anoeta
1991	Galarza III	Retegi II	22-15	Anoeta
1992	Galarza III	Retegi II	22-12	Anoeta
1993	Retegi II	Galarza III	22-19	Anoeta

=== 2nd hand-pelota singles championship ===
Year	Champion	Subchampion	Score	Fronton
1975	Retegi II	García Ariño IV	22-10	Anoeta

== 1st hand-pelota doubles championship ==
Year	Champions	Subchampions	Score	Fronton
1987-88	Retegi II - Errandonea	Ladutxe - Martinikorena	22-16	Anoeta
1988-89	Ladutxe - Tolosa	Retegi II - Arretxe	22-18	Anoeta
1989-90	Retegi II - Errandonea	Vergara II - Etxenagusia (1)	22-03	Anoeta
1990-91	Retegi II - Arretxe	Salaberria - Galarza III	22-19	Anoeta
1993-94	Titin III - Arretxe	Retegi II - Beloki	22-14	Ogueta
1994-95	Retegi II - Errandonea	Unanue - Zezeaga	22-17	Atano III
1996-97	Retegi II - Lasa III	Eugi - Zezeaga	22-14	Atano III

== Cuatro y Medio Euskadi Championship ==
Year	Champion	Subchampion	Score	Fronton
1989	Retegi II	Galarza III	22-06	Anoeta
1990	Retegi II	Galarza III	22-15	Anoeta
1991	Retegi II	Eugi	22-07	Ogueta
1997	Retegi II	Titín III	22-21	Ogueta
