= Pedro Martínez de Eulate =

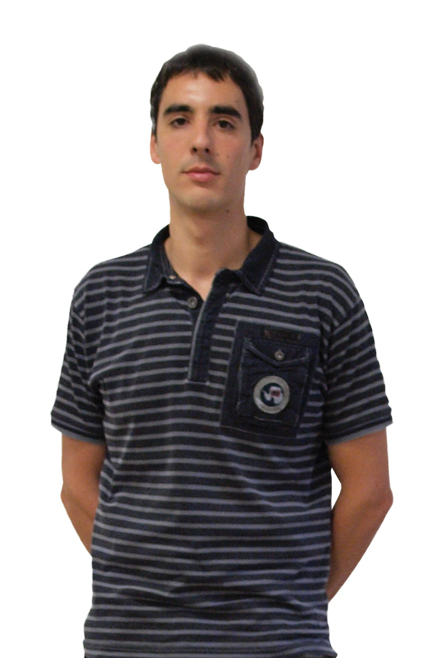

Personal information
- Full name: Pedro Martínez de Eulate
- Nickname: Eulate
- Born: 17 August 1979 (age 47) Estella, Navarra, Spain
- Height: 1.98 m (6 ft 6 in)
- Weight: 99 kg (218 lb)

Sport
- Country: Spain
- Sport: Basque pelota

Pedro Martínez de Eulate Maestresalas, know also as Martínez de Eulate or Eulate (born 17 August 1979), is a Basque pelota player of hand modality, plays on defense, winner of two doubles tournaments.

== Double hand-pelota championship finals ==
Year	Champions	Subchampions	Score	Fronton
2006	Martínez de Irujo - Martínez de Eulate	Olaizola II - Zearra	22-11	Ogueta
2007	Xala - Martínez de Eulate	Olaizola I - Beloki	22-18	Ogueta
