= Deportivo fronton =

Fronton in Bilbao, Spain

Deportivo
- Interactive map of Deportivo
- Full name: Frontón Deportivo
- Location: Recalde str. 28 Bilbao, Bizkaia
- Coordinates: 43.264816°N 2.934827°W
- Owner: Bilbao municipality
- Operator: Club Deportivo de Bilbao
- Capacity: 950
- Field size: 52m

Construction
- Opened: 5 April 1931
- Closed: October 2011

The Deportivo fronton is a Basque pelota fronton, used mainly in the modalities of hand-pelota, short bat, long bat, pala and paleta. It is located in Bilbao and owned by the local municipality. The 52-metre-long facility closed to the public in 2011 (it is still used by the sports club based there, with reduced playing dimensions), with events in the city moving to the Bizkaia fronton in the Miribilla district.

The fronton was home to the 1944 and 1957 1st Hand-Pelota singles championship, and the 1958, 1959, 1960 and 1994 2nd Hand-Pelota singles championship.

== Championships ==
=== 1st Hand-Pelota singles championship ===
Year	Champion	Runner-up	Score
1944	Atano III	Felipe (1)	22-08
1957	García Ariño I	Arriaran II	22-11

=== 2nd Hand-Pelota singles championship ===
Year	Champion	Runner-up	Score
1958	García Ariño II	Azkarate	22-20
1959	Arkaia	Elgea	22-11
1960	Lejarazu	Atano X	22-09
1994	Santi	Armendariz	22-10
