= José María Palacios Moraza =

Basque pelota player (1935–2002)

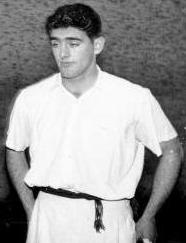
- Ogueta in 1959.

Personal information
- Full name: José María Palacios Moraza
- Nickname: Ogueta
- Born: 2 September 1935 Vitoria, Álava
- Died: April 2, 2002 (aged 66)

Sport
- Country: Spain
- Sport: Basque pelota

José María Palacios Moraza (September 2, 1935 – April 21, 2002), known by the pseudonym of Ogueta was a Basque pelota player in the category of hand-pelota. Often considered one of the best pelotaris of the history of Álava, in 1979 a professional fronton was named after him in Vitoria, the capital city of the province: the Ogueta fronton.

== Championships ==
=== 1st hand-pelota singles ===
| Year | Champion | Subchampion | Score | Fronton |
|---|---|---|---|---|
| 1958 | Ogueta | Arriaran II | 22-07 | Beotibar |
| 1959 | Ogueta | García Ariño I | 22-13 | Bergara municipal fronton |
| 1960 | Azkarate | Ogueta | 22-19 | Astelena |

=== 1st hand-pelota doubles ===
| Year | Champions | Subchampions | Score | Fronton |
|---|---|---|---|---|
| 1961 | Arriarán I - Arriarán II | Ogueta - Etxabe X | 22-15 | |
