= Francisco Larrañaga =

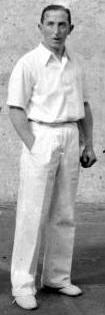
- Txikito de Iraeta

Personal information
- Full name: Francisco Larrañaga Albizu
- Nickname: Txikito de Iraeta
- Born: 14 September 1913 Cestona, Guipúzcoa

Sport
- Country: Spain
- Sport: Basque pelota

Francisco Larrañaga Albizu, known as Txikito de Iraeta (born 14 September 1913, date of death unknown) was a Basque pelota player, winner of the 1945 1st Hand-Pelota doubles championship.

== Early life ==
Larrañaga was born in Cestona on 14 September 1913. He resided with his family in the Iraeta neighbourhood, from which he took his nickname.

== Professional career ==
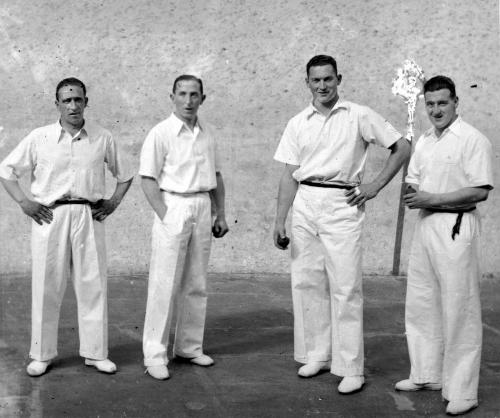
Txiquito de Mallavia, Txikito de Iraeta, Miguel Gallastegui and Felipe at the Astelena fronton in Eibar

He made his debut on 1931, but his best years as player were given between 1937 and 1942. On 11 August 1940 he played in Gros fronton the first professional hand-pelota singles championship of the history against Atano III, who defeated him with a final score of 22–8. In 1941 he reached the finale on the 1st Hand-Pelota doubles championship, along with Miguel Gallastegui, but they lost to Onaindia and Urcelay.. He participated in hand-pelota category during the 1930s and 1940s. In 1942 participated again on the hand-pelota 1st championship but lost to Gallastegui, in 1945 replaced Onaindia in the 1st Hand-Pelota doubles championship, pairing up with Lazcano due to that he suffered an injury during a regional tournament. Txikito de Iraeta and Lazcano won to Atano IV and Atano VII on the finale with a final score of 22-21 .

== Championships ==
=== 1st Hand-Pelota singles championship ===
Year	Champion	Subchampion	Score	Fronton
1940	Atano III	Txikito de Iraeta	22-08	Gros

== 1st Hand-Pelota doubles championship ==
Year	Champion	Subchampion	Score	Fronton
1940-41	Onaindia - Urcelay II	Txiquito de Iraeta - Gallastegui	22-18	Gros
1945	Txiquito de Iraeta (2) - Lazcano	Atano VII - Atano IV	22-17	Gros

== Legacy ==
The fronton located in the neighbourhood of Iratea, Cestona is named after him Txikito de Iraeta Fronton.
