= Juaristi =

Juaristi is a Basque surname. Notable people with the surname include:

- Aitziber Juaristi (born 1976), Spanish footballer
- Jon Juaristi (born 1951), Spanish writer
- María Begoña Juaristi (born 1968), Venezuelan model
- Mariano Juaristi (1904–2001), Spanish Basque pelota player
- Patxi Juaristi (born 1967), Spanish sociologist, linguist, writer and university professor
- Vicenta Juaristi Eguino (1780–1857), Bolivian soldier
