= Baiko Pilota =

- Genre: Entertainment
- Founded: 1992
- Founder: Karlos Arguiñano and Iñaki Aseguinolaza
- Headquarters: Navarra, Spain
- Services: Basque Pelota sponsors, Events
- Owner: Karlos Arguiñano
- Website: Baikopilota.eus

Baiko Pilota —named Asegarce until January 2019— is a Basque event production and deportive license company, mainly devoted to Basque pelota. Through the Bainet company, it has also made audiovisual productions.

== History ==
It was established in 1992 by Karlos Arguiñano and Iñaki Aseguinolaza, among others. Its creation was revolutionary for Basque pelota, giving it a professional structure, and starting the TV transmission of the sport, mainly in the Basque Country, La Rioja and Castilla y León.

In 1993 it took the lead of Eusko – Basque, that had until then exclusive rights on professional jai alai. So, together with the rights it had achieved before, Asegarce had exclusive rights on the categories of hand-pelota, pala (bat) and jai alai.

== Sponsored Players ==
Agirre	Apraiz	Argote	Arretxe
Begino	Belloso	Beloki I	Beloki II
Bengoetxea VI	Beobide	Berasaluze VIII	Chafee
Diaz	Eskudero	Ibai Zebala	Iza
Koka	Leiza	Mendizabal	Mendizabal II
Olaetxea	Olaizola I	Olaizola II	Oteiza
Otxandorena	Patxi Ruiz	Peñagarikano	Saralegui
Urrizelki	Urrutikoetxea	Zearra	
