= Velódromo de Anoeta =

Indoor Sports Arena in Spain

Coordinates: 43°17′56″N 1°58′20″W

Velodromo de Anoeta
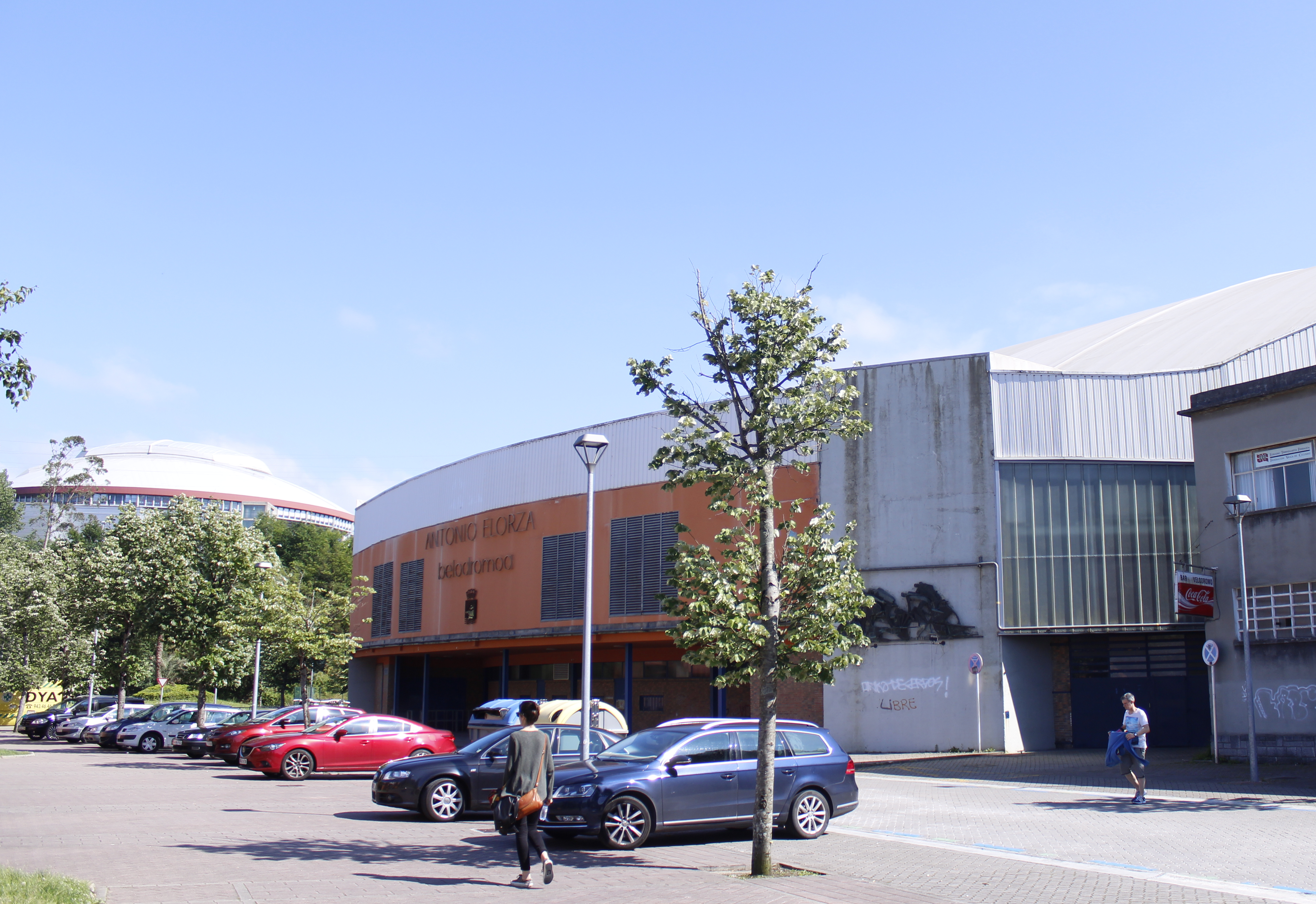
- Interactive map of Velodromo de Anoeta
- Location: San Sebastián, Spain
- Capacity: 5,500

Construction
- Opened: 1965

Tenant
- 1977 European Athletics Indoor Championships

Velódromo de Anoeta (formally and in Basque language Anoetako Belodromoa) is an indoor arena located at the Anoeta Sports Complex in San Sebastián, Spain. The arena holds a capacity for 5,500 spectators. It is primarily used for indoor athletics, motocross events, and concerts. It was opened in 1965 and was an outdoor velodrome until 1973 when was covered to host the world championships.

== Precession and Succession ==
Preceded by Parc des Princes; Paris	UCI Track Cycling World Championships; Venue; 1965	Succeeded by Waldstadion; Frankfurt
Preceded by Stade Vélodrome; Marseille	UCI Track Cycling World Championships; Venue; 1973	Succeeded by Le Stade du CEPSUM; Montreal
Preceded by Olympiahalle; Munich	European Indoor Championships in Athletics; Venue; 1977	Succeeded by Palasport di San Siro; Milan
