= Lajos =

- Gender: masculine
- Language: Hungarian
- Name day: August 25

Other gender
- Feminine: Ludovika, Lujza

Origin
- Language: Germanic
- Meaning: Famous warrior

Other names
- Nicknames: Lali, Lajcsi
- Cognate: Ludwig
- Anglicisation: Louis

Lajos (Hungarian pronunciation: [ˈlɒjoʃ]) is a Hungarian masculine given name, cognate to the English Louis. People named Lajos include:

Hungarian monarchs:

- Lajos I, 1326-1382 (ruled 1342-1382)
- Lajos II, 1506-1526 (ruled 1516-1526)

In Hungarian politics:

- Lajos Aulich, second Minister of War of Hungary
- Lajos Batthyány, first Prime Minister of Hungary
- Count Lajos Batthyány de Németújvár, county head of Győr and Governor of Fiume
- Lajos Dinnyés, Prime Minister of Hungary from 1947 to 1948
- Lajos Kossuth, Hungarian lawyer, politician and Regent of Hungary

In football:

- Lajos Baróti, coach of the Hungary national football team
- Lajos Czeizler, Hungarian football coach
- Lajos Détári, Hungarian football player
- Lajos Németh, Hungarian football referee
- Lajos Sătmăreanu, Romanian football player
- Lajos Tichy, Hungarian footballer

In art:

- Lajos Csordák, Hungarian/Slovak painter
- Lajos Lázár, Hungarian film director
- Lajos Markos, Hungarian American painter
- Lajos Koltai, Hungarian cinematographer and film director

In Hungarian literature:

- Lajos Bíró, Hungarian novelist, playwright, and screenwriter
- Lajos Egri, author of The Art of Dramatic Writing
- Lajos Hevesi, Jewish Hungarian journalist and author

In chess:

- Lajos Portisch, Hungarian chess player
- Lajos Steiner, Hungarian chess player

In other fields:

- Lajos Bárdos, Hungarian composer and professor of music at the Franz Liszt Academy of Music
- Lajos Ódor (1960–2026), Hungarian rower
- Lajos Pósa, Hungarian mathematician
- Lajos Rovátkay (1933–2026), Hungarian-born German harpsichordist and musicologist
- Lajos Werkner (1883–1943), Hungarian 2x Olympic champion saber fencer
- Zoltán Lajos Bay, Hungarian physicist

== See also ==
- Kossuth Lajos tér, a Metro station in Budapest
