= Gros fronton =

Fronton in San Sebastián, Spain

Gros
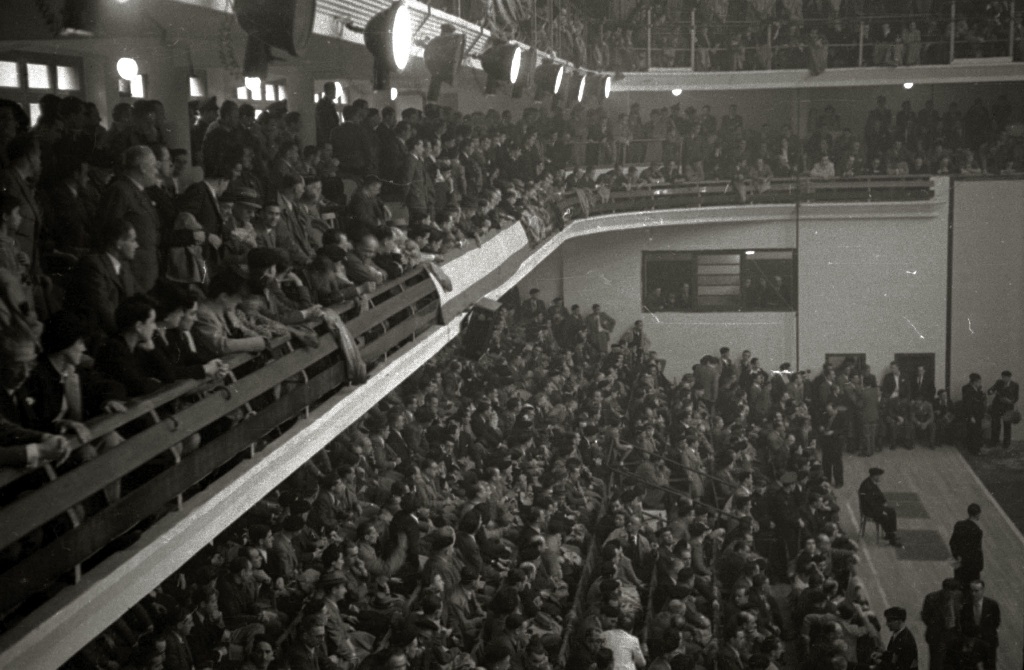
- Gros fronton in 1942
- Full name: Frontón Gros
- Owner: San Sebastián municipality
- Capacity: 670
- Field size: 31 m (long); 9.7m (wide)

Construction
- Groundbreaking: 1937
- Opened: 24 May 1938
- Demolished: 1961

The Gros fronton was a short fronton constructed in 1938 by the San Sebastián Municipality on the Gran Avenida street. The modalities played in the fronton were hand-pelota, paleta and short Xístera. The fronton was demolished in 1961.

== Championships ==
=== 1st Hand-Pelota singles championship ===
Year	Champion	Subchampion	Score
1940	Atano III	Txikito de Iraeta	22-08
1942	Atano III	Atano VII	22-05

=== 1st Hand-Pelota doubles championship ===
Year	Champions	Subchampions	Score
1941	Onaindia - Urcelay	Txikito de Iraeta - Gallastegui	22-18
