= Anoeta Sports Complex =

Sports venue in Donostria, Spain

Coordinates: 43.3012°N 1.9716°W

Anoeta Sports Complex (Spanish: Ciudad deportiva Anoeta; Basque: Anoetako kirolgunea) is a sports area located at the south of the city of Donostia (San Sebastián), Basque Country of Spain. It includes a number of facilities, with the Anoeta Stadium standing out as its main sports ground, home to the Spanish football premier league's team Real Sociedad.

== Sports facilities ==
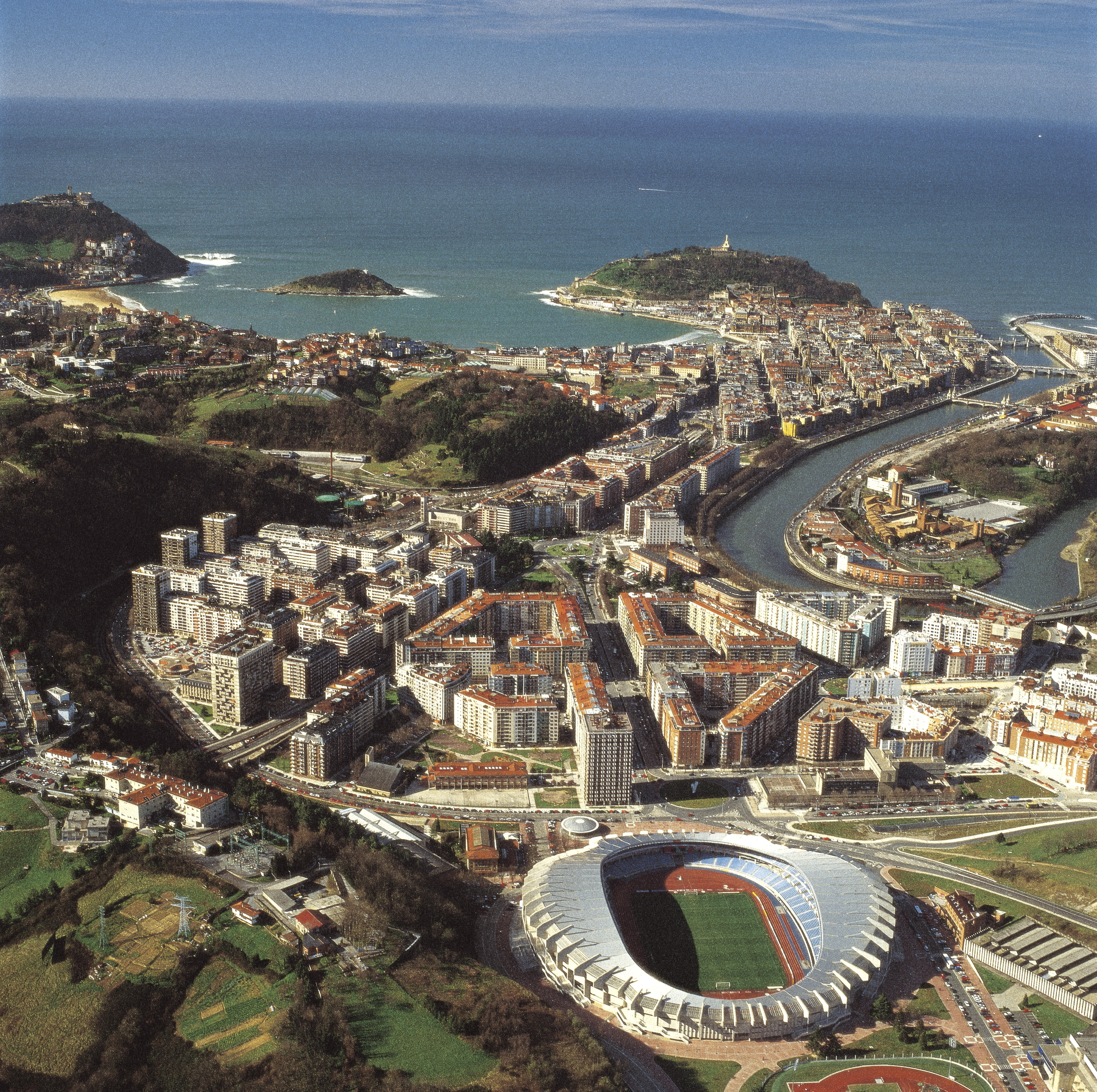
City of Donostia and partial view of the Anoeta Sports Complex at the bottom

- Anoeta Stadium
- Txuri Urdin Ice Rink Palace
- Antonio Elorza Velodrome, a.k.a. Anoeta Velodrome
- Miniestadio de Anoeta
- Jose Antonio Gasca City Sports Centre
- Paco Yoldi City Sports Centre and Swimming Pools
- Anoeta City Fronton
- Atano III Fronton
- City Archery Hall
- City Court of Air Rifle Practice
- City Court of Martial Arts
- Chess Centre

== Sporting clubs ==
- CHH Txuri Urdin Ice Hockey Team
- Real Sociedad Football Team

== Cultural venues ==
- Ernest LLuch Cultural Centre
- Real Sociedad Museum

== Public management ==
- Youth Information Centre
- Kirol-Etxea
- Donostia Kirola

== See also ==
- Amarapedia
