= Rubén Beloki =

Spanish pelotari

Personal information
- Full name: Rubén Beloki Iribarren
- Nickname: Beloki I
- Born: 8 August 1974 (age 51) Burlada, Navarra
- Years active: 1992 - ?
- Height: 1.86 m (6 ft 1 in)
- Weight: 89 kg (196 lb)

Sport
- Country: Spain
- Sport: Basque pelota

Rubén Beloki Irribarren, known as Beloki or Beloki I, is a Basque pelota defensive player, often considered one of the best in the history of the sport. He was born in Burlada on 8 August 1974. His brother Alberto Beloki is also a professional pelotari known as Beloki II.

== Professional career ==
Beloki won The Championship of Spain in 1991 and 1992, and a golden medal on 1992 Summer Olympics demonstration, four Hand-pelota 1st championships (1995, 1998, 1999 and 2001), turning in the youngest player to win a txapela at the age of 20. The doubles championships of 1996 and 2003, and a total of 5 subchampionships in the same category.

=== Hand-pelota (1st) ===
Year	Champion	Subchampion	Scoreboard	Fronton
1995	Beloki	Erradonea	22-15	Atano III
1998	Beloki	Eugi	22-13	Atano III
1999	Beloki	Arretxe	22-09	Atano III
2001	Eugi	Beloki	22-13	Atano III
2001	Beloki	Eugi	22-08	Atano III
2002	Barriola	Beloki	22-03	Atano III

=== Doubles-Pelota ===
Year	Champions	Subchampions	Score	Fronton
1993-94	Titin III - Arretxe	Retegi II - Beloki	22-14	Ogueta
1995-96	Capellán - Beloki	Etxaniz - Arretxe	22-18	Atano III
1999 (1)	Nagore - Errandonea	Berasaluze VIII - Beloki	22-17	Atano III
2001	Olaizola I - Goñi III	Alustiza - Beloki	22-13	Atano III
2003	Koka - Beloki	Olaizola II - Pascual	22-15	Atano III
2005	Martínez de Irujo - Goñi III	Bengoetxea VI - Beloki	22-12	Atano III
2007	Xala - Martínez de Eulate	Olaizola I - Beloki	22-18	Ogueta

=== Hand-pelota (2nd) ===
Year	Champion	Subchampion	Scoreboard	Fronton
1993	Beloki	Irazola	22-10	Anoeta

== Personal life ==
Rubén Beloki lived in Burlada until 29. After his marriage he moved to Gorraiz, where he lives with his wife and three children. A square and a fronton in the town are named after him.
