= Ulacia =

Ulacia is a surname of Basque origins. Notable people with the surname include:

- Guillermo Ulacia, Spanish businessman.
- Luis Ulacia (born 1963), Cuban baseball player.
- Yolexis Ulacia (born 1978), Cuban baseball player.
