= Lajos Csordák =

Hungarian painter

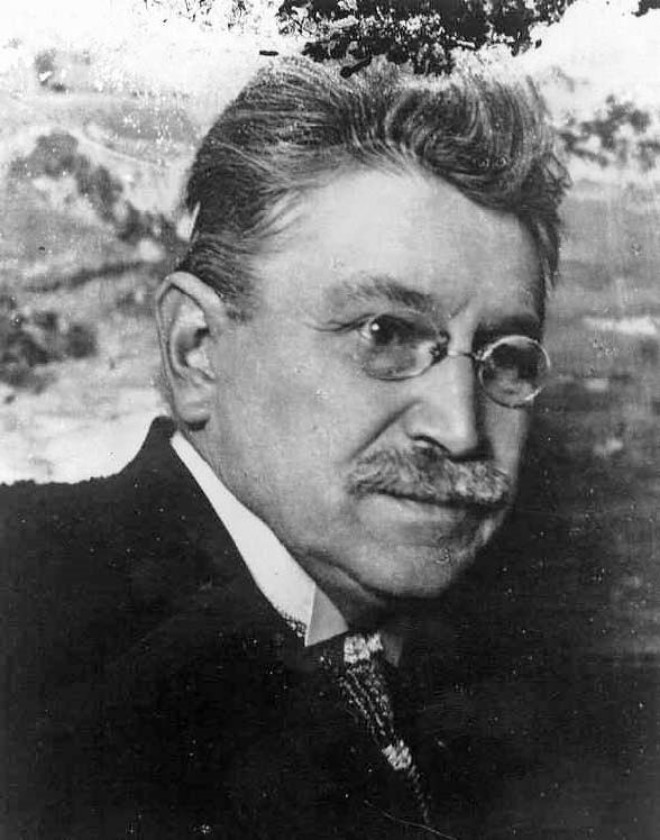
Lajos Csordák

Lajos Csordák (2 February 1864 in Kassa, – 28 June 1937 in Košice) was a Hungarian painter.

Csordák started to study painting around 1880. In 1883, his whole family moved to Munich. From 1889 to 1895 he studied at Academy of Fine Arts, Prague, under the guidance of Czech landscape painter Julius Mařák, and became a member of the artistic group Mánes Union of Fine Arts. After 1908, he lived permanently in Košice.

In painting he specialised on landscapes using dry materials pastels. He was influenced by impressionism in his works.
