= Mikel Amantegui =

Spanish footballer

Personal information
- Full name: Mikel Amantegui Errandonea
- Date of birth: 3 May 1979 (age 47)
- Place of birth: Irun, Spain
- Height: 1.79 m (5 ft 10 1/2 in)
- Position: Left-back

Senior career*
Years	Team	Apps	(Gls)
1998–2000	Real Sociedad B		
2000–2002	Cultural Leonesa	35	(1)
2002–2004	Sabadell	57	(2)
2004–2006	Badalona	69	(2)
2006–2008	Orihuela	72	(1)
2008–2009	Girona	18	(0)
2009	Albacete	8	(0)
2010	Benidorm	12	(0)
Total		271	(6)
- * Club domestic league appearances and goals

Mikel Amantegui Errandonea (born 3 May 1979 in Irun, Basque Country) is a Spanish retired footballer who played as a left-back.
