= Eratsun =

Municipality of Spain

Coordinates: 43°5′1″N 1°47′48″W

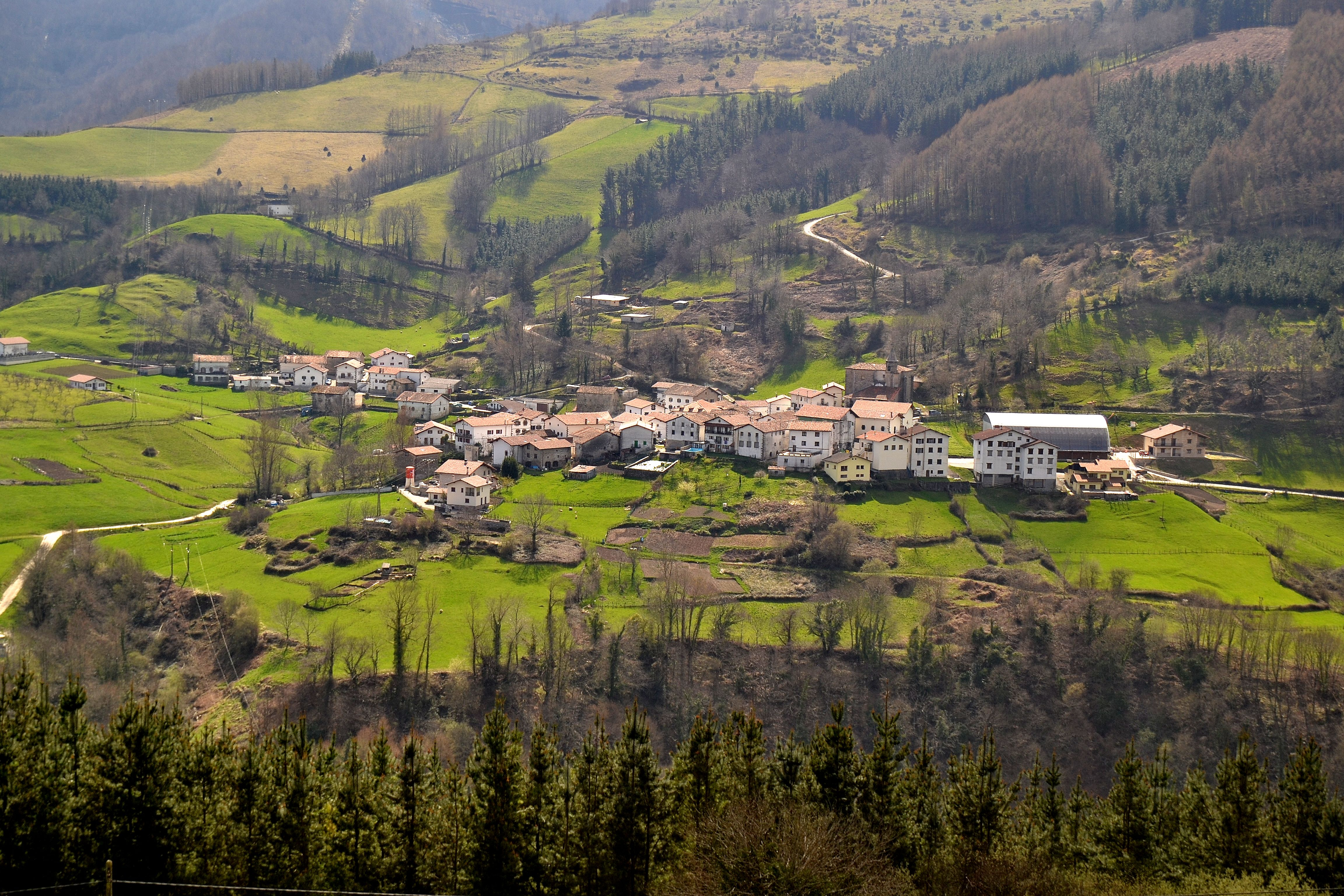
View of Eratsun, Basque Country, Spain

Eratsun is a town and municipality located in the province and autonomous community of Navarre, northern Spain.
