= Asier Olaizola =

Spanish pelota player

Personal information
- Full name: Asier Olaizola
- Nickname: Olaizola I
- Born: 5 May 1975 (age 51) Goizueta, Navarra
- Height: 1.86 m (6 ft 1 in)
- Weight: 87 kg (192 lb)

Sport
- Country: Spain
- Sport: Basque pelota

Asier Olaizola Apezetxea, also known as Olaizola I, is a pelotari in the first category of hand-pelota.

His brother is pelotari Aimar Olaizola. During his professional career Olaizola won the doubles hand-pelota championships of 1999 and 2001, and earned subchampionships in 2002 and 2007.

== Doubles hand-pelota championship finals ==
Year	Champions	Subchampions	score	Fronton
1999	Olaizola I - Elkoro	Goñi II - Zezeaga	22-15	Adarraga
2001	Olaizola I - Goñi III	Alustiza - Beloki	22-13	Atano III
2002	Xala - Lasa III	Olaizola I - Patxi Ruiz	22-19	Atano III
2007	Xala - Martínez de Eulate	Olaizola I - Beloki	22-18	Ogueta
