= Astelena fronton =

Fronton located in Eibar, Spain

Astelena
- Catedral de la pelota a mano (Hand-Pelota Cathedral)
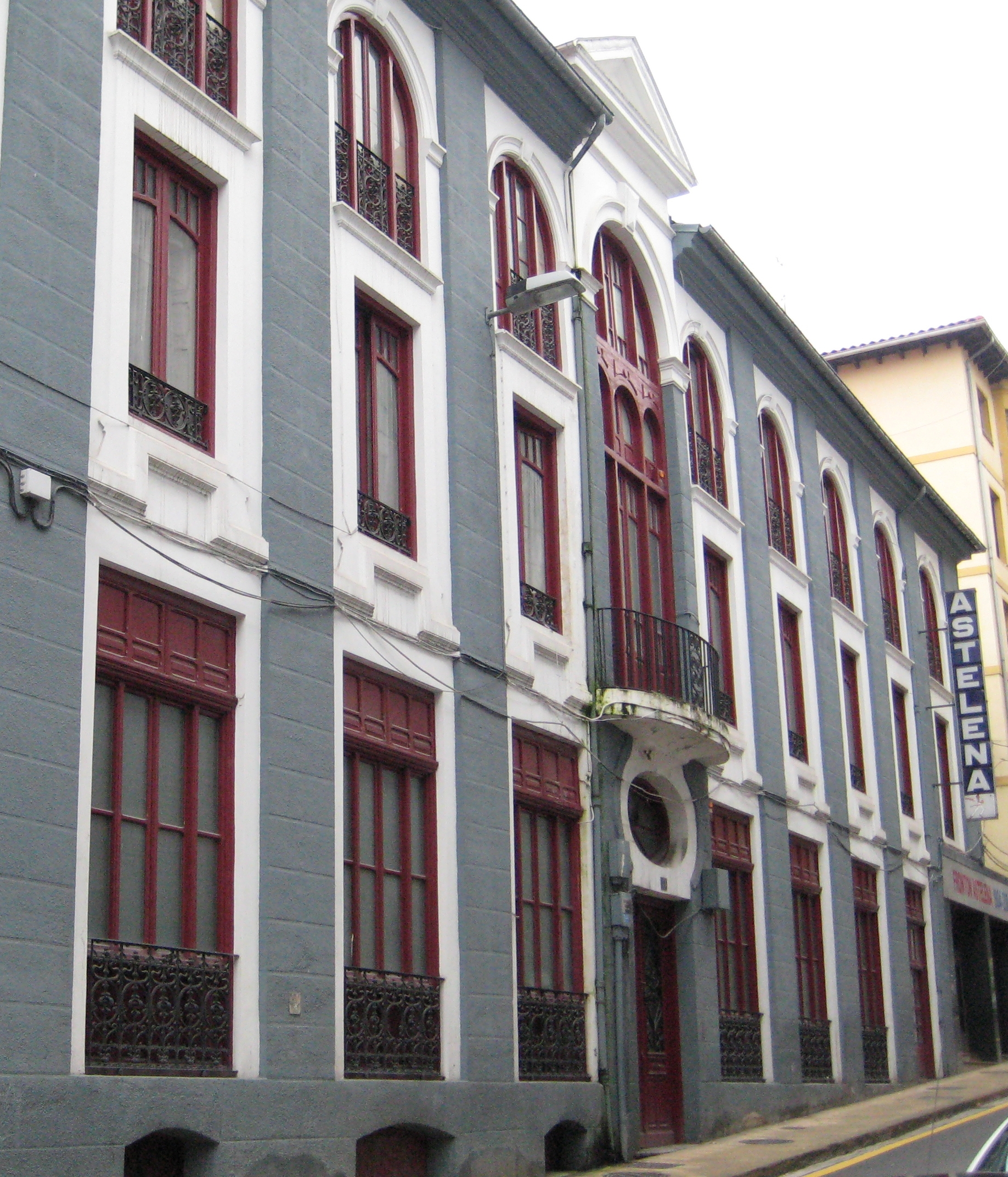
- Interactive map of Astelena
- Full name: Frontón Astelena
- Location: 11 Isasi Street, Eibar, Gipuzkoa, Basque Autonomous Community, Spain
- Coordinates: 43°11′02.04″N 2°28′31.66″W
- Owner: Eibar municipality
- Capacity: 1250
- Field size: 41m (Length); 11m (wide); 9m (height)

Construction
- Groundbreaking: 1903
- Opened: 24 June 1904
- Renovated: 1969-2006-2007
- Architects: José Gurruchaga (original), Cosme de Uriarte (1969),
- General contractor: Francisco Irusta
- Main contractors: Josefa Echeverría & sons

The Astelena fronton, nicknamed Cathedral of Basque Hand-pelota, is a fronton located in Eibar, Gipuzkoa, Basque Autonomous Community, Spain.

Astelena is a short 41 meter-long fronton where hand-pelota and pala modalities are played. The field has a width of 11 m, and the wall a height of 9 m.

It was inaugurated in 1904 and has been renovated on several occasions, most recently between 2006 and 2007, to meet current needs. The finals of the 1st Hand-Pelota singles championship (1946, 1950, 1954, 1955, 1956, 1960, 1966, 1973 and 1999) and the Cuatro y Medio Euskadi Championship final of 1992 were played at the Astelena.

== History ==
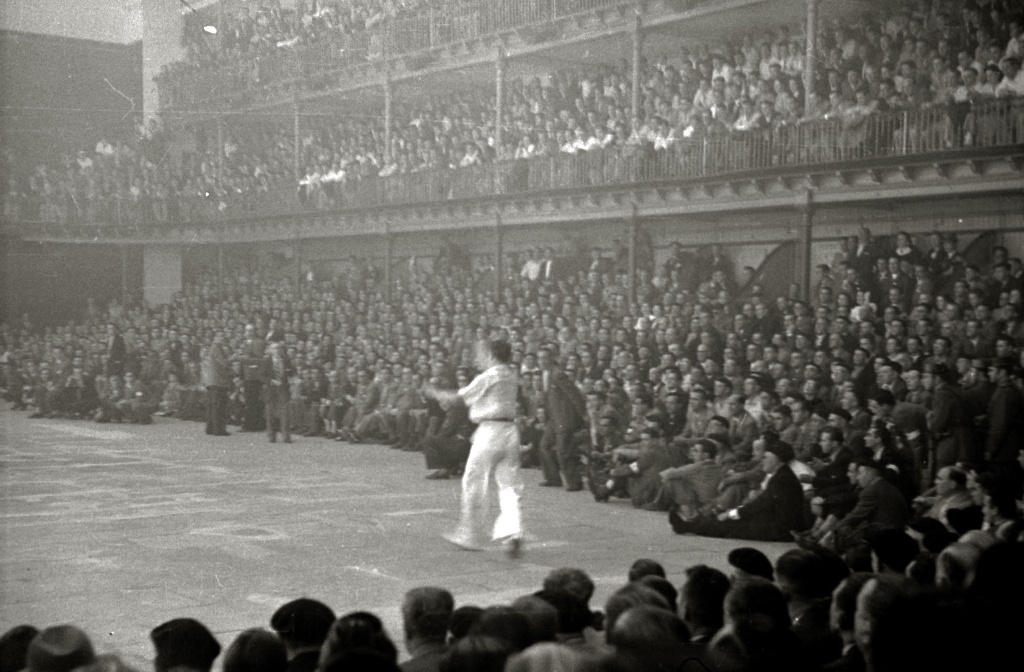
Astelena fronton in 1946.

The fronton was inaugurated in 1904 on the Feast of St John, the patron saint of Eibar, with a game to 22 points between local players Tacolo and Cantabria. In October of the same year, Francisco Irusta, a local resident, presented a project to cover the open-air fronton, which was signed and approved by José Gurruchaga, the municipal architect.

Since the fronton was the only public closed space in Eibar, most important events of the town were celebrated there, including boxing matches, dances, cockfights, festivals, and dinners honouring specific people.

In 1906 it was purchased by C. Aguirre, F. Bascaran, I. Irusta, M. Echeverría, M. Gómez, I. Vildósola, A. Eguiguren and B. Gárate.

The fronton suffered several damage during the Civil War and was used as a barracks and dining place until 1940, when the 1st Hand-Pelota singles championship was established. On 20 November 1955 the 50th anniversary of the fronton was celebrated, despite both the day and year being wrong.

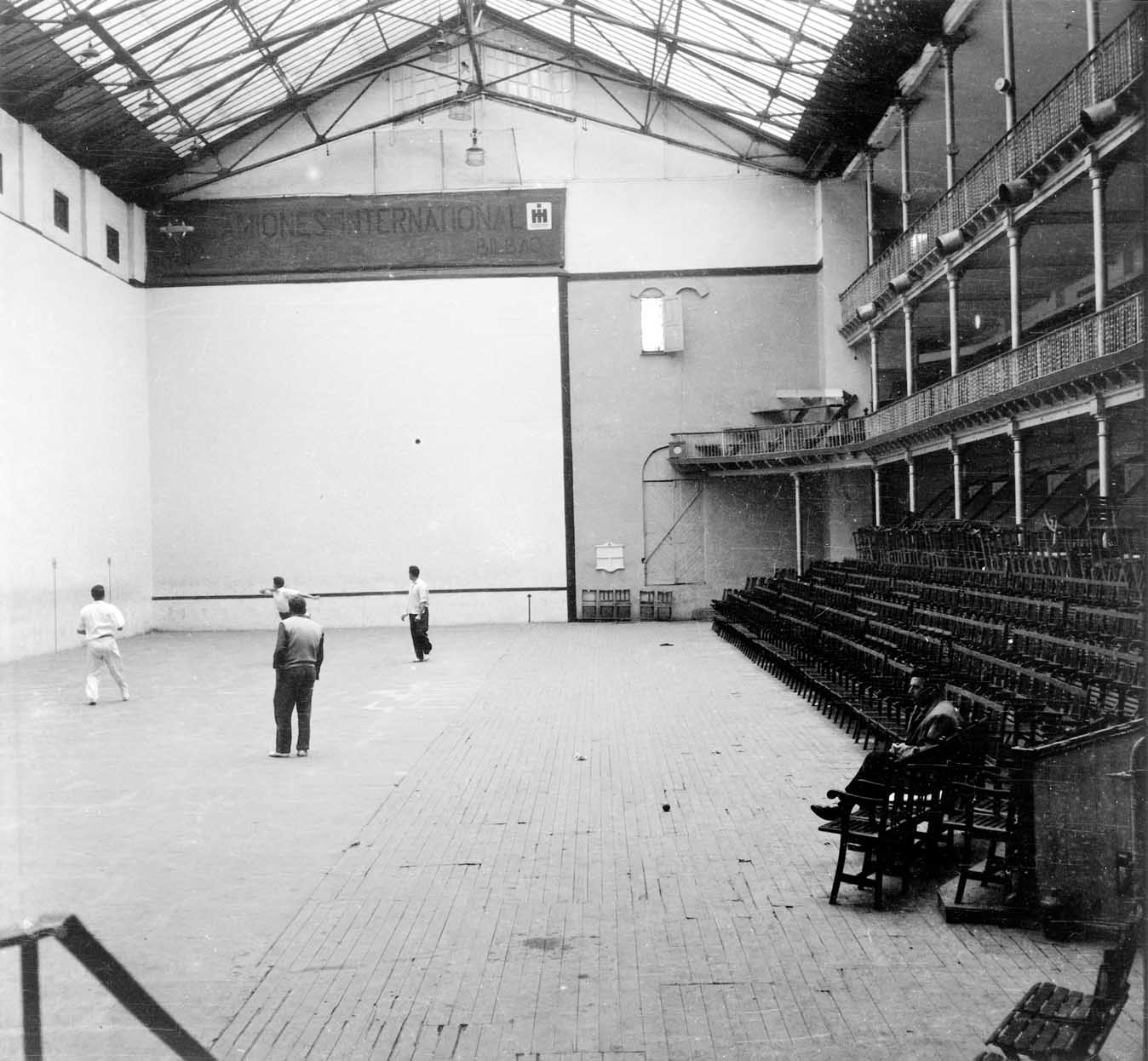
Astelena fronton in 1960

On 28 December 1969 the fronton was closed for renovations supervised by Cosme de Uriarte. The exterior appearance of the building was not changed, but door gate 9, which gave spectators direct access to the field, was replaced by a new door, and the window in the left wall was replaced. The re-inauguration took place on 8 October 1972, in a game played between Retegi I and Tapia. Luciano Gastañagatorre and Alberto Vidarte were the facility owners. The renovated fronton had a capacity of 1300 spectators.

On 28 December 1997 the fronton was closed again for renovations, after two years of being owned by Asegarce.

In 1998 Aspe purchased the facilities, which were reopened with a game between Goñi I and Elkoro.

In 2004 a commemorative anniversary book was published.

On 1 March 2005 the fronton was again closed due to a disagreement among the owners (60% the Gaztañatorre family of Bilbao and 40% the Vidarte family of Eibar).

On 2006, it was purchased for €3 million by the municipality of Eibar and again closed for major renovations during 2006–2007, finally reopening on 20 May 2007.

=== Name ===
In a publicity move, the fronton was named Astelena, which means Monday in Euskara, because on Mondays, being the first day after the weekend, workers were inefficient and used to attend pelota games instead of working a full day.

== Championships ==
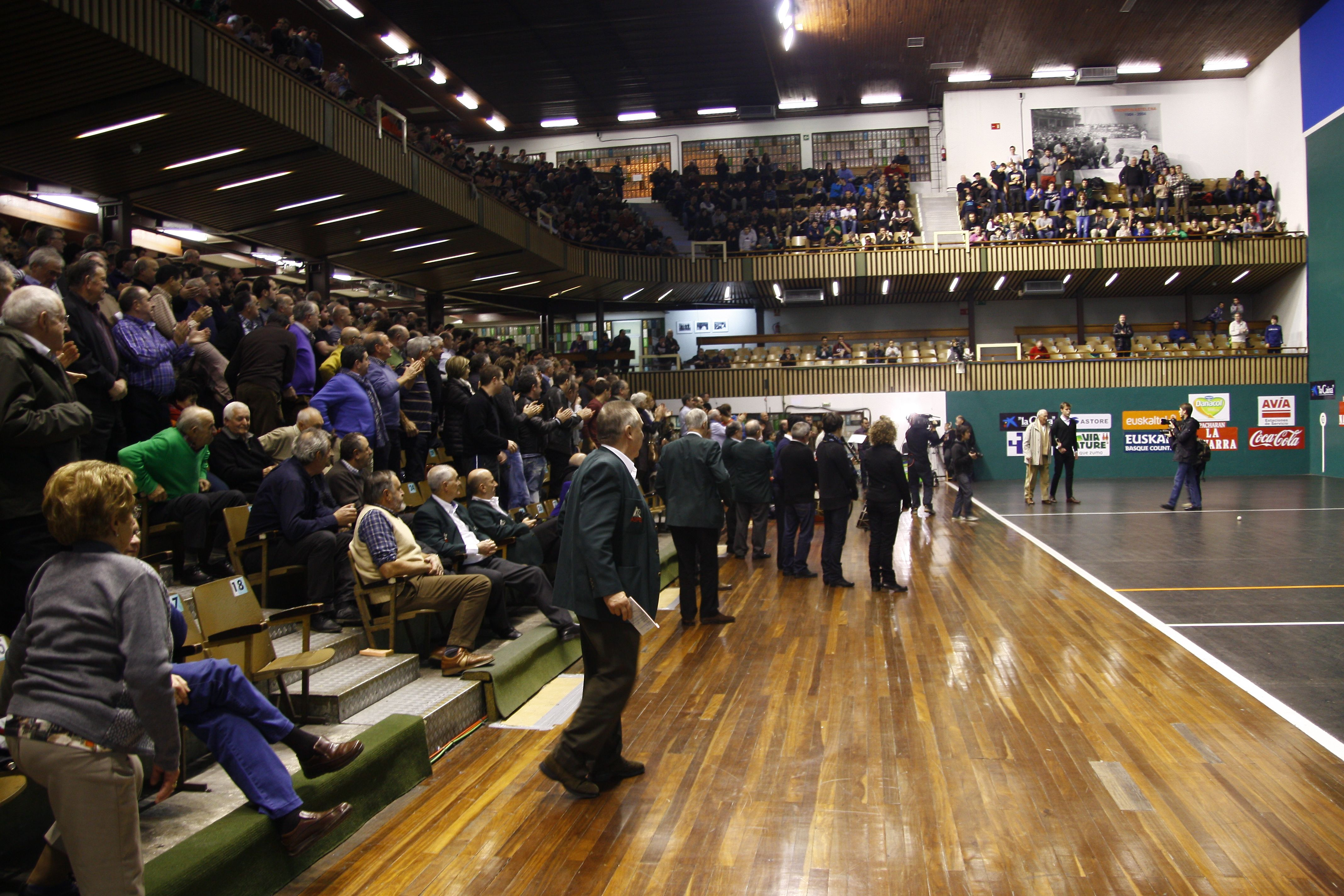
Stands of Astelena fronton

=== 1st Hand-Pelota singles championship ===
Year	Champion	Subchampion	Score
1946	Atano III	Akarregi	22-16
1950	Gallastegui	Akarregi	22-15
1954	Soroa II	Barberito I	22-04
1955	Arriaran II	Soroa II	22-13
1956	Arriaran II	Garcia Ariño I	22-13
1960	Azkarate	Ogueta	22-19
1966	Atano X	Azkarate	22-13
1973	Retegi I	Tapia I	22-20
1999	Eugi	Elkoro	22-11

=== Cuatro y Medio Euskadi Championship ===
Year	Champion	Subchampion	Score
1992	Eugi	Errasti	22-12
