= Ogueta fronton =

Basque pelota fronton

Ogueta
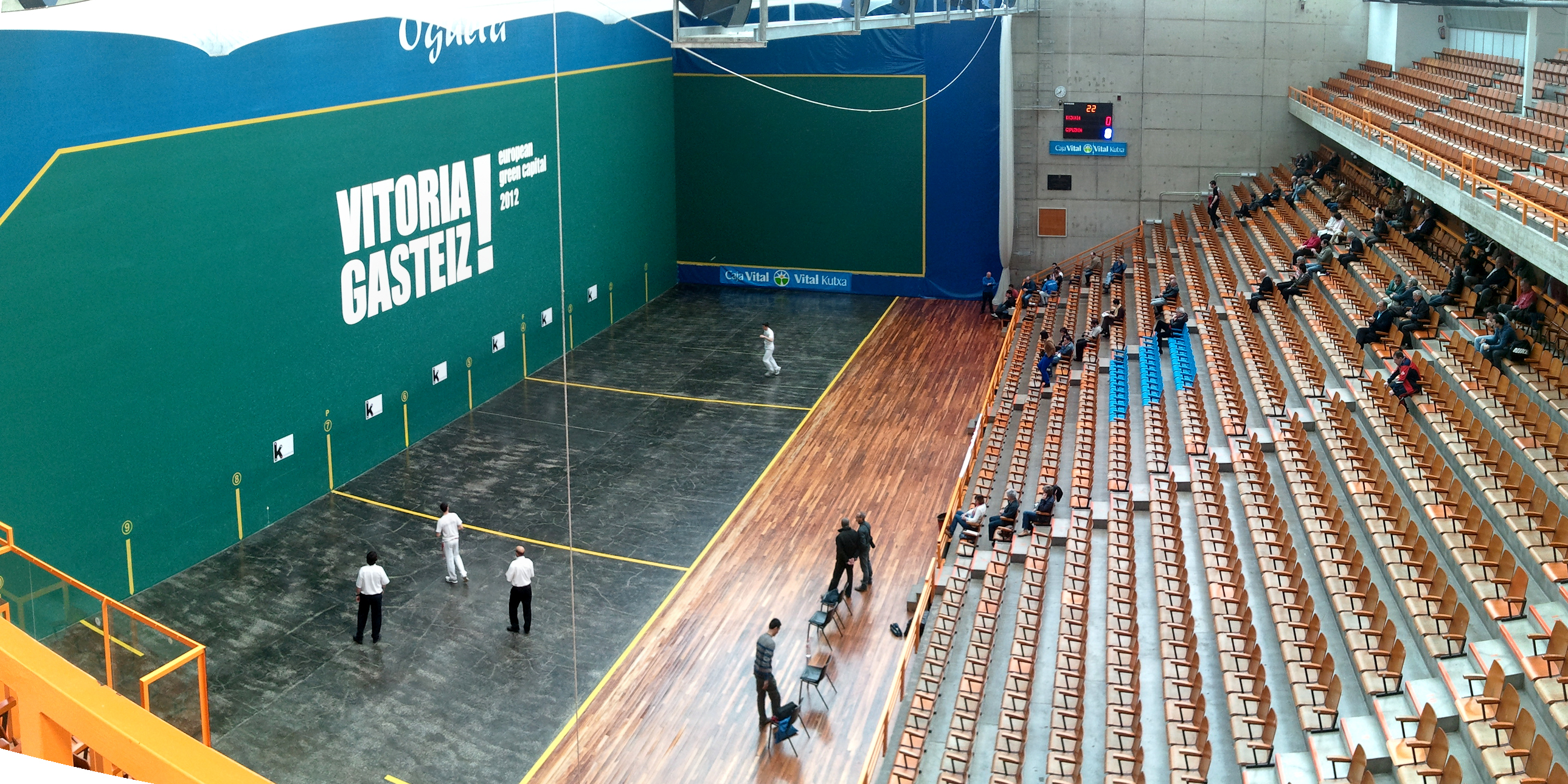
- Interactive map of Ogueta
- Full name: Frontón Ogueta
- Location: Plaza Amadeo Garcia de Salazar, 2, Vitoria, Álava, Basque Country, Spain
- Coordinates: 42°50′13″N 2°41′11″W
- Owner: Vitoria municipality
- Capacity: 2155
- Field size: 36 m

Construction
- Groundbreaking: 1978
- Opened: 31 March 1979

Ogueta is a short Basque pelota fronton located in Vitoria, in Álava Province, Basque Country, Spain.

== History ==
Ogueta was built in 1979 for the need of a high capacity fronton for the important events of professional pelota. It's named after José María Palacios Moraza, considered to be the best pelotari born in Álava.

== Modalities ==
The main modalities played in the fronton are Hand-pelota and Paleta-rubber. Despite that Ogueta has a bigger capacity than Atano III, were played only two 1st Hand-pelota championship finals. It's the usual fronton used for the Doubles-pelota and Cuatro y Medio championships.

=== Doubles-pelota championship finals ===
- Total: 7

Year	Champions	Subchampions	Score
1991-92	Vergara II - Arretxe	Unanue - Zezeaga	22-18
1992-93	Alustiza - Maiz II y Etxaniz - Zezeaga	Titín III - Arretxe y Urioraguena - Galarza III	22-20 y 22-15
1993-94	Titin III - Arretxe	Retegi II - Beloki	22-14
2000	Titin III - Lasa III	Unanue - Errasti	22-19
2006	Martínez de Irujo - Martínez de Eulate	Olaizola II - Zearra	22-11
2007	Xala - Martínez de Eulate	Olaizola I - Beloki	22-18
2008	Olaizola II - Mendizabal II	Titín III - Laskurain	22-17

=== 1st Hand-Pelota championship finals ===
- Total: 2

Year	Champion	Subchampion	Score
1979	Bengoetxea III	García Ariño IV	22-10
1994	Arretxe	Errandonea	22-12

=== Cuatro y Medio championship finals ===
- Total: 13

Year	Champions	Subchampions	Score
1991	Retegi II	Eugi	22-07
1994	Eugi	Errandonea	22-13
1995	Nagore	Unanue	22-18
1996	Arretxe	Nagore	22-08
1997	Retegi II	Titín III	22-21
1998	Nagore	Eugi	22-11
1999	Unanue	Eugi	22-11
2001	Barriola	Eugi	22-10
2002	Olaizola II	Barriola	22-13
2003	Nagore	Titín III	22-15
2004	Olaizola II	Barriola	22-08
2006	Martínez de Irujo	Barriola	22-21
2007	Titín III	Barriola	22-15
