= Augusto Ibáñez Sacristán =

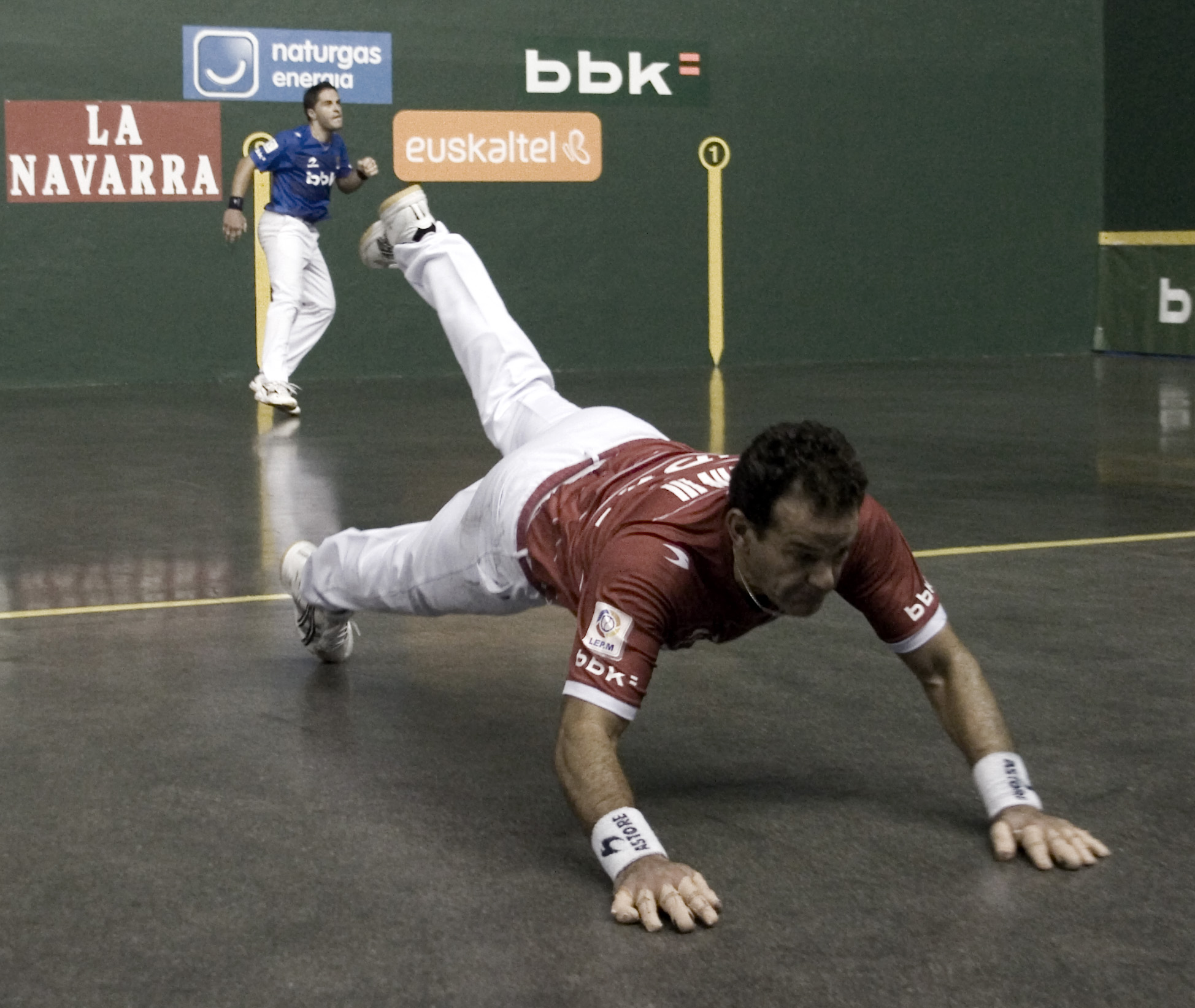
- Titín III falling to the floor after hitting the ball on a professional game.

Personal information
- Full name: Augusto Ibáñez Sacristán
- Nickname: Titín III
- Born: 13 January 1969 (age 57) Tricio, La Rioja
- Height: 1.80 m (5 ft 11 in)
- Weight: 86 kg (190 lb)

Sport
- Country: Spain
- Sport: Basque pelota

Augusto Ibáñez Sacristán, also known as Titín III, is a Basque pelota forward player. He was champion of the Doubles Hand-pelota tournaments in 1994, 2000, 2004 and 2012.

== Professional career ==
Titín III made his professional debut on 13 September 1992 on the Barberito I fronton, from Baños de Río Tobía, losing the game along with Maiz II to Bengoetxea IV and Berna for a final score of 22–21. In 1994 along with Arretxe won his first Doubles Hand-pelota Championship, and repeated the title again in 2000 and 2004 with different partners on the defense. On 2 December 2007 he won the Cuatro y Medio championship after defeating Abel Barriola in the final for 22–15 on the Ogueta fronton in Vitoria. On 10 February 2008 a sculpture of his hand along with a gigantography of him on the hitting wall were inaugurated on Adarraga fronton in Logroño. On 30 March 2008 he lost the final of the doubles championship along with Laskurain, to Olaizola II and Mendizábal II for 22–17.

== Personal life ==
Titín III's nephew Víctor López is a footballer.

== Cuatro y Medio Championship finals ==
Year	Champion	Subchampion	Score	Fronton
1997	Retegi II	Titín III	22-21	Ogueta
2003	Nagore	Titín III	22-15	Ogueta
2007	Titín III	Barriola	22-15	Ogueta

== Hand-pelota doubles championship finals ==
Year	Champions	Subchampions	Score	Fronton
1992-93 ^{(1)}	Alustiza - Maiz II	Titín III - Arretxe	22-20	Ogueta
1993-94	Titín III - Arretxe	Retegi II - Beloki	22-14	Ogueta
2000	Titín III - Lasa III	Unanue - Errasti	22-19	Ogueta
2004	Titín III - Goñi III	Martínez de Irujo - Lasa III	22-8	Atano III
2008	Olaizola II - Mendizábal II	Titín III - Laskurain	22-17	Ogueta
