= Beotibar fronton =

Fronton in Tolosa, Gipuzkoa, Spain

Coordinates: 43°08′11″N 2°04′32″W

Beotibar
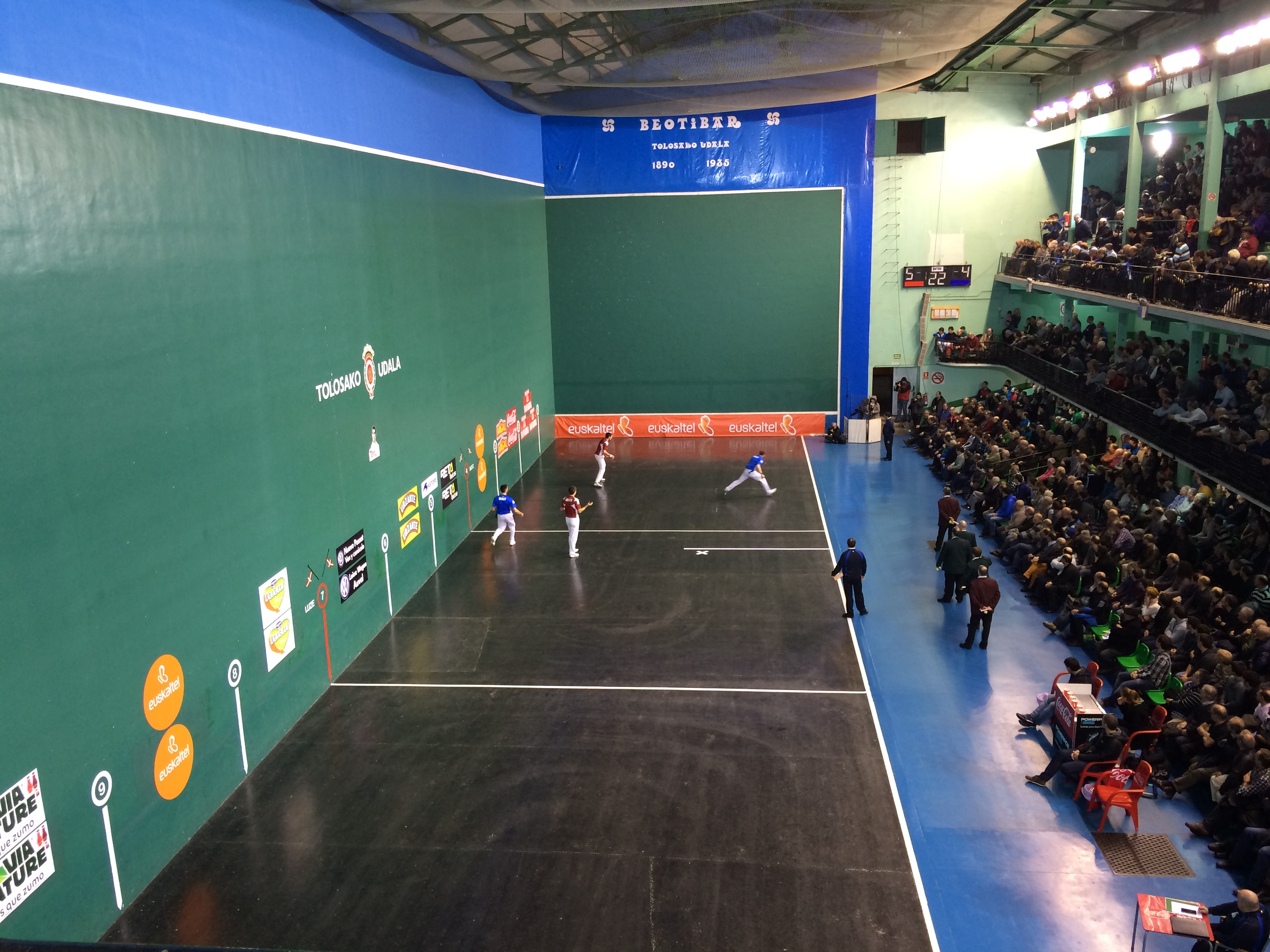
- Interactive map of Beotibar
- Full name: Frontón Beotibar
- Location: San Francisco Ibiltokia, Tolosa, Gipuzkoa, Basque Country, Spain.
- Capacity: 950
- Field size: 32m

Construction
- Opened: 14 February 1890
- Architect: Federico Zavala Ortés de Velasco

The Beotibar fronton is a short fronton located in Tolosa, Gipuzkoa. The fronton is mainly dedicated to hand-pelota and it was home of the 1958 and the 1962 1st Hand-Pelota singles championships as of 1962, 1965, 1970, 1971 and 2009 editions of 2nd Hand-Pelota singles championship.

== Championships ==
=== 1st Hand-Pelota Singles championship ===
Year	Champion	Subchampion	Score	
1958	Ogueta	Arriaran II	22-07	Beotibar
1962	Azkarate	García Ariño I	22-21	Vitoriano

=== 2nd Hand-Pelota singles championship ===
Year	Champion	Subchampion	Score
1962	García Ariño II	Elgea	22-17
1965	Vergara I	Andueza III	22-17
1970	Oreja II	Del Val II	22-16
1971	Erostarbe	Arruabarrena	22-10
