= Iñaki Otxandorena =

Spanish pelotari (born 1977)

Iñaki Otxandorena (born May 16, 1977) is a Basque pelota player. He made his professional debut in March 1998 and has since played in various championships and has won at fairs such as San Fermin and Zarauz. In November 2012 he announced that he intended to retire from the sport.
