= Navarra Arena =

Indoor sporting arena in Pamplona, Spain

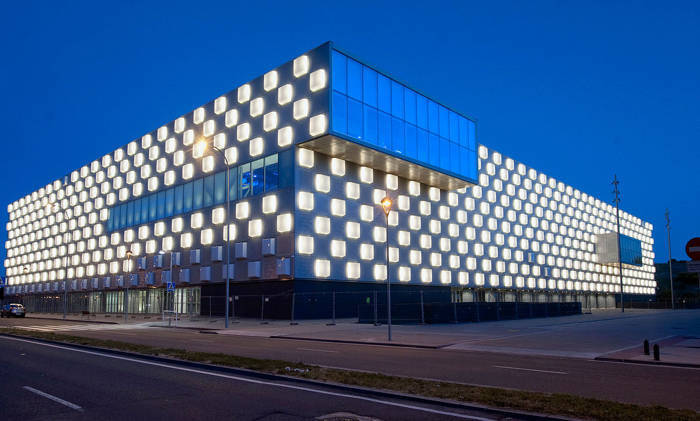
- Interactive map of Navarra Arena
- Location: Pamplona, Spain
- Coordinates: 42.795990°N 1.635437°W
- Owner: Government of Navarre
- Capacity: 11,800 (arena); 9,850 (main court); 3,000 (fronton)
- Surface: Parquet Floor

Construction
- Groundbreaking: 2009
- Built: 2012
- Opened: 29 September 2018
- Cost: €60m

Navarra Arena is an indoor sporting arena and fronton located in Pamplona, Spain. Its capacity is 11,800 people in the arena configuration, 9,808 in the main court and 3,000 in the fronton.

== History ==
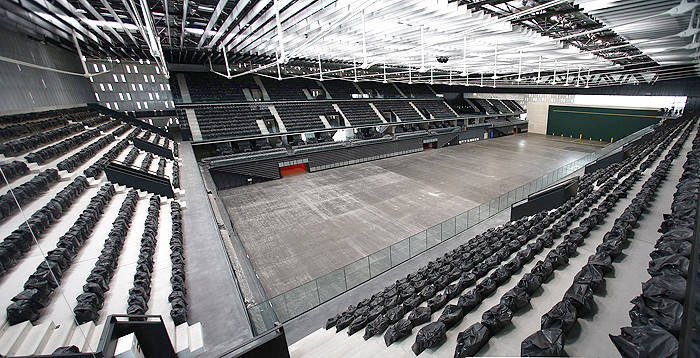
The arena in August 2017 before opening

Located in the place of the old swimming pools property of local football club CA Osasuna, Reyno de Navarra Arena started to be built in 2009. In May 2013, despite being the works being very close to completion, Reyno de Navarra Arena continues to be closed.

In May 2016, the two main enterprises of Basque pelota ruled out an opening in 2016.

The Navarra Arena was finally inaugurated on 29 September 2018 with a final of a Basque pelota championship, the 2018 Cuatro y Medio Euskadi Championship. The first match played at the main court was a basketball friendly match between Spain and Lithuania, hosted on 2 August 2019. The arena registered a sold-out.

In December 2023 was the venue for Navarra Indoor Athletics, the first event of the 2024 World Athletics Indoor Tour. The event broke Spain's indoor athletics attendance record.

In July 2024, the European Championship for the Rubik's cube was held here.

The 2025 Trampoline Gymnastics World Championships was held at the arena.

== See also ==
- List of indoor arenas in Spain
