= Beloki =

Beloki is a Basque surname. Notable people with the surname include:

- Joseba Beloki (born 1973), Spanish former professional road bicycle racer
- Rubén Beloki (born 1974), Basque pelota player, known as Beloki I
- Alberto Beloki (born 1978), Basque pelota player, known as Beloki II
- Markel Beloki (born 2005), Spanish professional cyclist, son of Joseba
