= Alberto Beloki =

Spanish pelotari

Personal information
- Full name: Alberto Beloki
- Nickname: Beloki II
- Born: 26 August 1978 (age 47) Burlada, Navarra
- Height: 1.87 m (6 ft 2 in)
- Weight: 83 kg (183 lb)

Sport
- Country: Spain
- Sport: Basque pelota

Alberto Beloki, also known as Beloki II, is a Basque pelota forward player, born in Burlada on 26 August 1978. His brother Rubén Beloki is also a professional pelotari known as Beloki I, often considered one of the best in the history of the sport. The only major win recorded by Beloki II was the 2nd category Doubles-pelota championship in 2003.
