= ASPE (Basque pelota) =

ASPE Jugadores de Pelota S.L.
- Genre: Entertainment
- Founded: 1998
- Headquarters: Navarra, Spain
- Services: Basque Pelota sponsors
- Owner: Fernando Vidarte
- Website: aspepelota.com

ASPE Jugadores de Pelota S.L. is a sports management company dedicated to promote Basque pelota.

== History ==
The company was established in 1998, taking place ever since in the Cuatro y Medio, Doubles-pelota and hand-pelota categories. ASPE takes part also in the formation of pelotaris supporting aficionados and schools dedicated to the sport.

== Sponsored Players ==
Player	Player	Player	Player
Altuna III	Barriola	Cecilio	Darío
Elezkano II	Elordi	Erostarbe	Ezkurdia
Gorka	Irribarria	Irusta	Jaka
Jaunarena	Martija	Martinez de Irujo	Mendizabal III
Merino I	Merino II	Retegi Bi	Rezusta
Tolosa	Ugalde	Urruzola	Zabaleta
Zubieta			
