= Juan Martínez de Irujo =

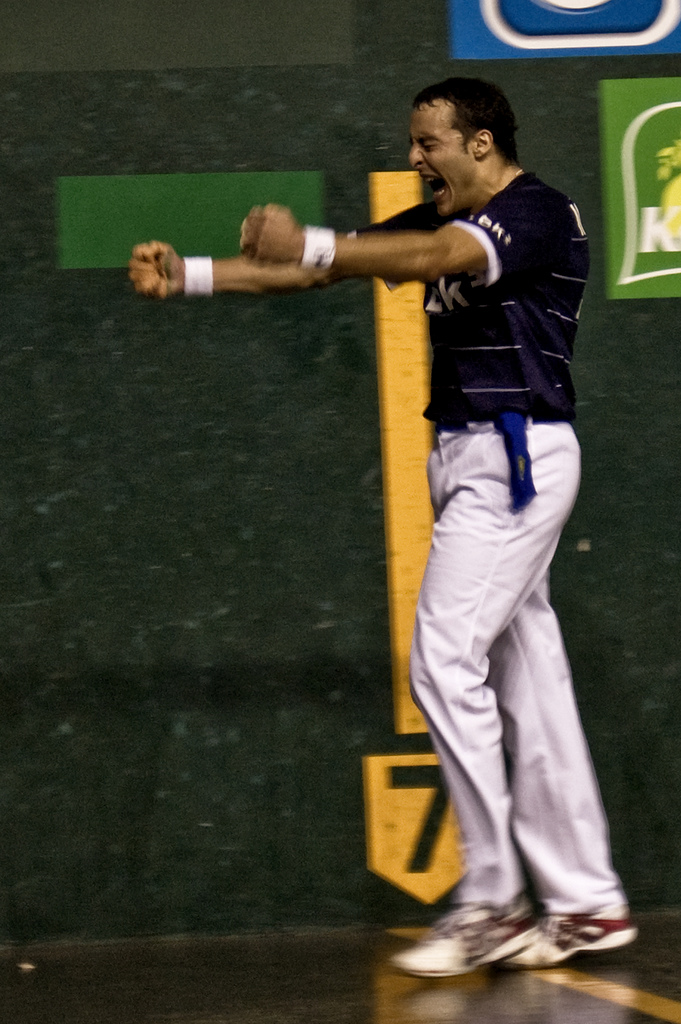

Personal information
- Full name: Juan Martínez de Irujo
- Nickname: Mtz. de Irujo
- Born: 4 December 1981 (age 44) Ibero, Olza, Navarra
- Height: 1.86 m (6 ft 1 in)
- Weight: 84 kg (185 lb)

Sport
- Country: Spain
- Sport: Basque pelota

Juan Martínez de Irujo (born 4 November 1981) is a professional Basque pelota player for the Aspe team.

== Early life ==
Martínez de Irujo was born in 1981 in Ibero, Olza. He is the son of Juan Angel Martinez de Irujo and the nephew of the late professional pelotari (pelota player) Javier Martínez de Irujo.

== Professional career ==
Martinez de Irujo made his debut on the Labrit fronton in 2003, and soon became an important player, winning the Hand-pelota championship and runner-up with Lasa III on the doubles tournament held the same year. In 2005 he was again runner-up of the 1st hand-pelota championship, but won the doubles with Goñi III. In 2006 he won the three pelota titles: hand single, hand doubles and Cuatro y Medio like Julián Rategui had done back in 1990. In 2008 he was again runner-up at cuatro y medio to Olaizola II. In 2009 he again won the doubles championship along with Fernando Goñi, and won his third single hand-pelota title against Olaizola II.

== 1st Hand-pelota championship finals ==
Year	Champion	Runner-up	Score	Fronton
2004	Martínez de Irujo	Xala	22-12	Atano III
2005	Olaizola II	Martínez de Irujo	22-18	Atano III
2006	Martínez de Irujo	Olaizola II	22-17	Atano III
2009	Martínez de Irujo	Olaizola II	22-12	Atano III
2010	Martínez de Irujo	Xala	22-13	Atano III
2014	Martínez de Irujo	Retegi Bi	22-9	Atano III

== Doubles hand-pelota championship finals ==
Year	Champions	Runners-up	Score	Fronton
2004	Titín III - Goñi III	Martínez de Irujo - Lasa III	22-8	Atano III
2005	Martínez de Irujo - Goñi III	Bengoetxea VI - Beloki	22-12	Atano III
2006	Martínez de Irujo - Martínez de Eulate	Olaizola II - Zearra	22-11	Ogueta
2009	Martínez de Irujo - Goñi III	Olaizola II - Mendizabal II	22-21	Atano III
2013	Martínez de Irujo - Zabaleta	Berasaluze VIII - Albisu	22-4	Bizkaia
2014	Martínez de Irujo - Badiola	Olaizola II - Aretxabaleta	22-13	Bizkaia
2016	Urrutikoetxea - Olaizola II	Martínez de Irujo - Rezusta	16-10	Bizkaia

== Cuatro y Medio Euskadi Championships ==
Year	Champion	Runner-up	Score	Fronton
2006	Martínez de Irujo	Barriola	22-21	Ogueta
2008	Olaizola II	Martínez de Irujo	22-17	Atano III
2009	Sébastien González	Martínez de Irujo	22-18	Atano III
2010	Martínez de Irujo	Barriola	22-17	Atano III
2011	Olaizola II	Martínez de Irujo	22-12	Bizkaia
2013	Olaizola II	Martínez de Irujo	22-16	Ogeta
2014	Martínez de Irujo	Olaizola II	22-17	Bizkaia
2015	Urrutikoetxea	Martínez de Irujo	22-20	Bizkaia
