= Mariano Juaristi =

Spanish pelotari (1904–2001)

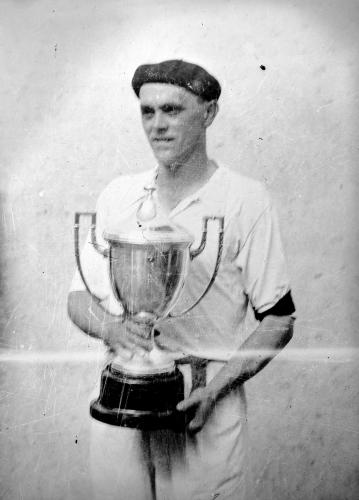
- Mendizábal with a txapela and trophy

Personal information
- Full name: Mariano Juaristi Mendizábal
- Nickname: Atano III
- Born: February 21, 1904 Azkoitia, Gipuzkoa
- Died: January 12, 2001 (aged 96)
- Weight: 84 kg (185 lb)

Sport
- Country: Basque Country, Spain
- Sport: Basque pelota

Mariano Juaristi Mendizábal (February 21, 1904 – January 12, 2001) was a Basque pelota player known as Atano III. He is often considered one of the best pelotaris of all time, dominating the 1st hand-pelota category from 1926 to 1948 and winner of 4 championships (1940, 1942, 1944 and 1946).

== Early life ==
Mariano Mendizábal was born on 1904 in Azkoitia, Guipúzcoa, Spain in the Caserío Atano from which his family pseudonym comes. The Juaristi (or Atano) family formed a pelotari dynasty, six of them were pelotaris and one of them manufactured balls. Mariano, Atano III, was the most well-known of them.

Atano VII, his younger brother, also was a very important player, as was Atano X, son of Atano I.

== Professional career ==
Mendizábal made his professional debut in 1920, on the Azkoitia fronton. He was noted for his speed, flexibility, fast plays and powerful serves that soon turned him in a revolutionary icon for the sport at a time when the prevailing playing style was one characterized by heavy rebounds and slow plays.

Mendizábal was also known for his fragile hands that only allowed him to play only once a month to prevent injury. During his career he beat the best hand-pelota players of the 1920s such as Zabala II from Elgoibar and Ulacia from Guetaria, losing only to Artamendi II, in Marquina with a final score of 13-22.

Mendizábal's winning streak started in 1926 when he beat the best player of the time and champion, Juan Bautista Azcárate. For turn into a contender he had to play a first game against the champion where his superiority was attributed to the fact that he was able to play with both hands while Azcárate was only able to play with one. During the title dispute, played in a series of three games, Mendizábal beat his rival with the final scores of 22-19, 22-12 and 22-9. The last one was played on January 1, 1927, in Bilbao.

At the height of his career, Mendizábal earned 6000 Pesetas per appearance at a time when a regular pelotari earned only 250; in addition, due to the frequent injuries caused by the fragility of his hands, his games were highly anticipated and recorded large attendances.

=== 1st Hand-pelota Championships ===
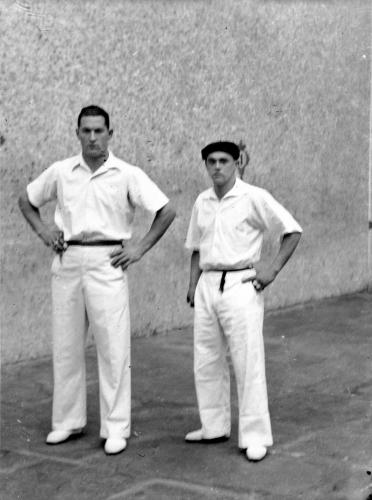
Mendizábal (right), next to Miguel Gallastegui

Mendizábal went unchallenged for fourteen years, until the pelota federation established the first Hand-Pelota Championship in 1940. There, he revived his title after winning to Txikito from Iraeta with a final score of 22–8. The championship was played every two years and Mendizábal won the title in the following three editions: 1942 (beat Atano VII 22–5), 1944 (beat Felipe 22–8) and 1946 (beat Akarregi 22–16). He was finally defeated in his final championship 22–6 by Miguel Gallastegui in 1948.

Year	Champion	Subchampion	Score	Fronton
1940	Atano III	Txikito de Iraeta	22-08	Gros fronton
1942	Atano III	Atano VII	22-05	Gros fronton
1944	Atano III	Felipe	22-08	Deportivo fronton
1946	Atano III	Akarregi	22-16	Astelena fronton
1948	Gallastegui	Atano III	22-06	Bergara fronton

== Death ==
Mendizábal lost the ability to walk and was limited to a wheelchair in his last years, dying on January 12, 2001.

== Legacy ==
After his retirement, in 1967 received the deportive merith medal and the main fronton of San Sebastián was renamed from Anoeta to Atano III after him.
