= Oinatz Bengoetxea =

Spanish pelotari (born 1984)

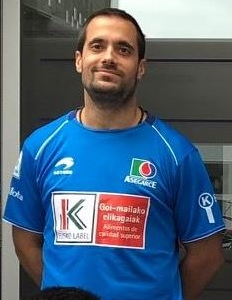
Bengoetxea in 2018

Oinatz Bengoetxea (born August 28, 1984, in Leitza) is a player of Basque pelota who won the 1st Hand-Pelota singles championship in 2008.
