= Aimar Olaizola =

Spanish pelotari

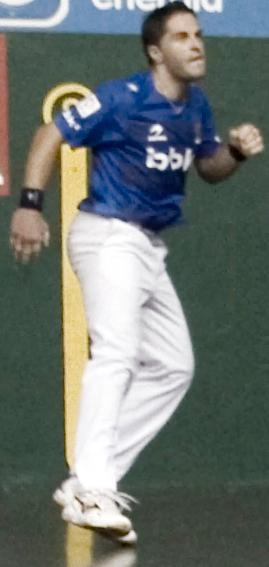
- Pelotari, brother of Olaizola I.

Personal information
- Full name: Aimar Olaizola
- Nickname: Olaizola 2
- Born: 13 November 1979 (age 46) Goizueta, Navarre
- Height: 1.83 m (6 ft 0 in)
- Weight: 87 kg (192 lb)

Sport
- Country: Spain
- Sport: Basque pelota

Aimar Olaizola Apezetxea, also known as Olaizola II, is a Basque pelotari and the younger brother of Olaizola I. He is considered to be one of the greatest players in history.

== Early life ==
Olaizola started to play pelota on the local fronton of his hometown, Goizueta, Navarre.

== Professional career ==
During his career, Olaizola II won in 2005, 2007, 2012 and 2013 the main hand-pelota championship — the singles championship — additionally reaching the finals of 2003, 2006, 2009 and 2015.

=== 1st hand-pelota singles championship finals ===
Year	Champion	Subchampion	Score	Fronton
2003	Patxi Ruiz	Olaizola II	22-7	Atano III
2005	Olaizola II	Martínez de Irujo	22-18	Atano III
2006	Martínez de Irujo	Olaizola II	22-17	Atano III
2007	Olaizola II	Barriola	22-10	Atano III
2009	Martínez de Irujo	Olaizola II	22-12	Atano III
2012	Olaizola II	Martínez de Irujo	22-07	Bizkaia
2013	Olaizola II	Martínez de Irujo	22-07	Bizkaia
2015	Urrutikoetxea	Olaizola II	22-19	Bizkaia

=== Cuatro y Medio championship finals ===
Year	Champion	Subchampion	Score	Fronton
2002	Olaizola II	Barriola	22-13	Ogueta
2004	Olaizola II	Barriola	22-08	Ogueta
2005	Olaizola II	Xala	22-05	Atano III
2008	Olaizola II	Martinez de Irujo	22-17	Atano III
2011	Olaizola II	Martínez de Irujo	22-12	Bizkaia
2012	Olaizola II	Bengoetxea VI	22-9	Ogueta
2013	Olaizola II	Martínez de Irujo	22-16	Ogueta
2014	Martínez de Irujo	Olaizola II	22-17	Bizkaia

=== 1st hand-pelota doubles championship finals ===
Year	Champions	Subchampions	Score	Fronton
2003	Koka - Beloki	Olaizola II - Pascual	22-15	Atano III
2006	Martínez de Irujo - Martínez de Eulate	Olaizola II - Zearra	22-11	Ogueta
2008	Olaizola II - Mendizábal II	Titín III - Laskurain	22-17	Ogueta
2009	Mtz. de Irujo - Goñi III	Olaizola II - Mendizabal II	22-21	Atano III
2011	Olaizola II - Begino	Xala - Beroitz	22-14	Bizkaia
2014	Martínez de Irujo - Barriola	Olaizola II - Aretxabaleta	22-13	Bizkaia
2016	Olaizola II - Urrutikoetxea	Martínez de Irujo - Rezusta	16-10	Bizkaia

=== 2nd Hand-Pelota singles championship ===
Year	Champion	Subchampion	Score	Fronton
1999 (1)	Olaizola II	Hirigoyen	22-16	Astelena

(1) Two championships were played in 1999, due to disagreements between the two main professional Basque-pelota companies — Aspe and Asegarce.
