= Etxaniz =

Etxaniz is a Basque surname. Notable people with the surname include:

- Javier Etxaniz (born 1970), Spanish sprint canoeist
- Josu Etxaniz (born 1985), Spanish footballer
