= Patxi Ruiz =

Spanish pelotari (born 1980)

Patxi Ruiz (born 27 February 1980) is a former champion in Basque pelota.
