= Errandonea =

Errandonea is a surname of Basque origin. Notable people with that name include:

- Francisco Javier Vila Errandonea (AKA Patxi Vila, born 1975), Spanish cyclist
- José María Errandonea (born 1940), Spanish cyclist
- Mikel Amantegui Errandonea (born 1979), Spanish footballer
- Teresa Errandonea (born 1994), Spanish athlete
