= Errasti =

Errasti is a Spanish surname. Notable people with the surname include:

- Aurelio Arteta Errasti (1879–1940), Spanish painter
- Ciriaco Errasti (1904–1984), Spanish footballer
- Jon Errasti (born 1988), Spanish footballer
- Iñaki Lejarreta Errasti (1983–2012), Spanish mountain biker
