= Miguel Gallastegui =

Gipuzkoan pelotari (1918–2019)

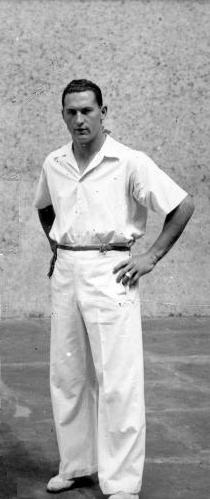
Gallastegui in 1942

Miguel Gallastegui Ariznavarreta (25 February 1918 – 4 January 2019) was a Gipuzkoan pelotari, a Basque pelota player. He made his debut on 29 June 1936 and played the sport until 1960.
