= Eibar =

Eibar Eibar (Basque) Éibar (Spanish)
- Municipality
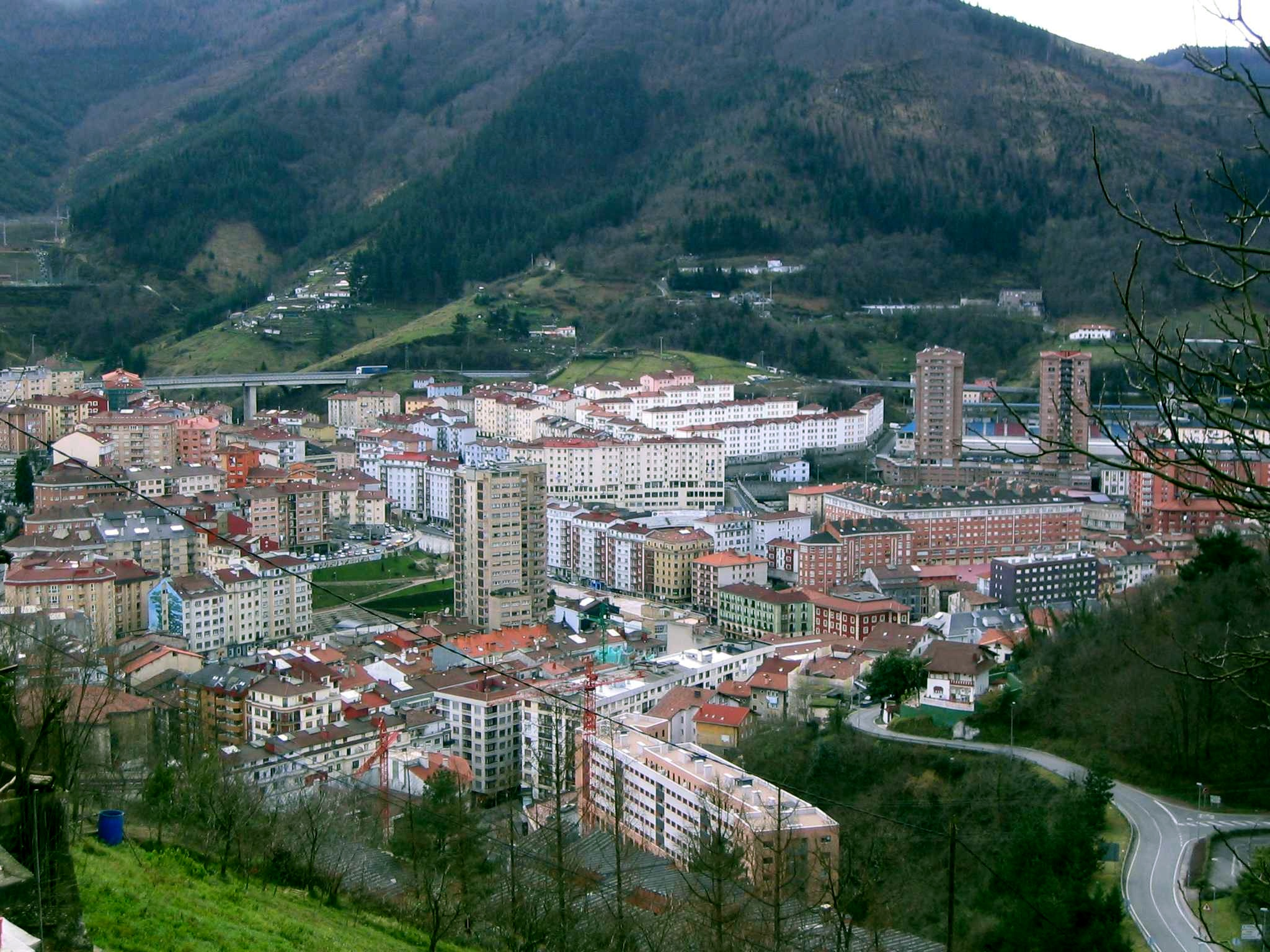
- View of Eibar

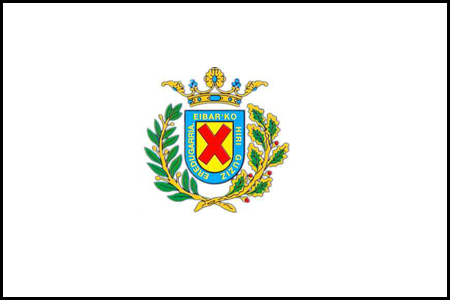
- Flag Coat of arms

- Location of Eibar within the Basque Autonomous Community Eibar (Spain)
- Coordinates: 43°11′N 2°28′W
- Country: Spain
- Autonomous community: Basque Country
- Province: Gipuzkoa
- Eskualdea: Debabarrena

Government
  - Mayor: Jon Iraola (PSE-EE)

Area
  - Total: 24.78 km^{2} (9.57 sq mi)
- Elevation: 121 m (397 ft)

Population (2025)
  - Total: 27,464
  - Density: 1,108/km^{2} (2,871/sq mi)
- Time zone: UTC+1 (CET)
  - Summer (DST): UTC+2 (CEST)
- Website: Official website

Eibar (Basque: Eibar; Spanish: Éibar) is a town and municipality in the province of Gipuzkoa in the Basque Autonomous Community in northern Spain. It is the capital of the eskualde / comarca of Debabarrena. It has 27,464 inhabitants.

Its chief industry is metal manufacturing, and the city has been known since the 16th century for the manufacture of armaments, particularly finely engraved small arms. It was also the home of Serveta scooters.

It is home to the SD Eibar football team.

== History ==
The city was chartered by Alfonso XI of Castile in 1346, receiving the name of Villanueva de San Andrés de Heybar.

The feudal families that dominated the territory engaged in the War of the Bands. Eibar, like the rest of settlements in the valley, had an industry based on finery forges and arms manufacturing. In 1766, Eibar was engaged in a social revolt known as the Machinada, and years later, in 1794, it was attacked by the French, who destroyed the town.

In the 19th century, industrialisation transformed the systems of production in the city and spawned a powerful social movement. After the rest of Gipuzkoa sided with the French in 1793 during the French Revolutionary Wars, Eibar temporarily voted to join Biscay. In the Carlist Wars, Eibar sided with the Liberals. The labour movement and socialism became particularly strong in Eibar. In 1931, it was the first city in Spain to proclaim the Second Spanish Republic; in recognition it was given the title of "Very Exemplary City".

Euskal Herriko Ahotsak project with local Basque speakers and old photographs

In the Spanish Civil War, Eibar was practically destroyed by Italian bombers aiding the Spanish Nationalists. The subsequent rebuilding brought significant industrial development and a demographic increase, as Eibar's population increased to nearly 40,000 within a few years.

Due to the lack of space for expansion, several factories moved to Durangaldea and Álava. The industrial crisis in the 1980s also caused Eibar to lose a great part of its population.

At the beginning of the 21st century, Eibar's economy is based on industry and services.

== Geography ==
Eibar lies at an altitude of 121m above sea level, in the west of the province of Gipuzkoa, very close to Biscay. Eibar has an oceanic climate. The town lies in a narrow valley in a mountainous area, with mountains like Karakate, Kalamua and Akondia being between 700 and 800 metres tall. Eibar is traversed by the river Ego, which is a tributary of the Deba.

Apart from the urban area, the municipality consists of five rural neighbourhoods: Otaola-Kinarraga, Aginaga, Arrate, Mandiola and Gorosta.

== Demographics ==
Historical population
Year	Pop.	±%
1842	1,917	—
1857	3,792	+97.8%
1877	4,149	+9.4%
1887	5,041	+21.5%
1900	6,459	+28.1%
1910	9,659	+49.5%
1920	12,146	+25.7%
1930	12,984	+6.9%
1940	12,191	−6.1%
1950	16,372	+34.3%
1960	31,870	+94.7%
1970	37,229	+16.8%
1981	36,919	−0.8%
1991	32,362	−12.3%
2001	28,219	−12.8%
2011	27,382	−3.0%
2021	27,402	+0.1%
Source: INE

As of 2025, the population is 27,464, of which 48.6% are male, and 51.4% are female. Minors make up 16.1% of the population, and seniors make up 26.0%.

=== Immigration ===
As of 2025, immigrants make up 16.0% of the population. The 5 largest foreign countries of birth are Morocco, Colombia, Nicaragua, Venezuela, and the Dominican Republic.

== Main sights ==
- Church of San Andrés, built during the 16th and 17th centuries, it has a Gothic style with Renaissance and Baroque elements.
- Sanctuary of the Virgin of Arrate, from the beginning of the 17th century.
- Hermitage of Azitain, it contains a rare 17th-century beardless Christ.
- Palace of Unzueta, from the 17th century.
- Palace of Aldatze, from the 17th century.
- Palace of Markeskua, from the 16th century.
- City Hall, built in concrete over the river Ego, designed by architect Ramón Cortázar and inaugurated on 14 September 1901.
- Coliseo Theatre, inaugurated in 1947 and refurbished in 2007.
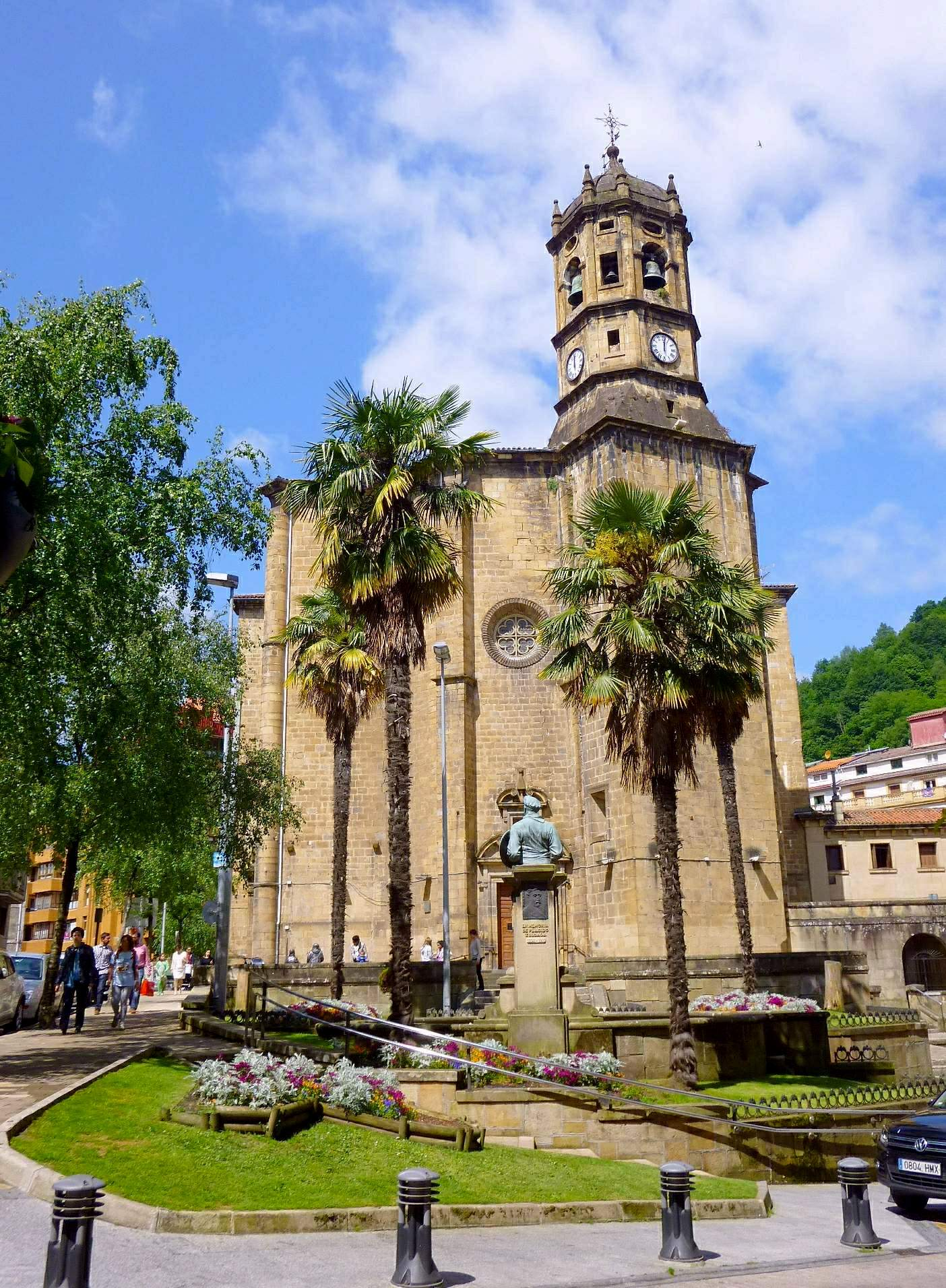
Church of San Andrés in Eibar

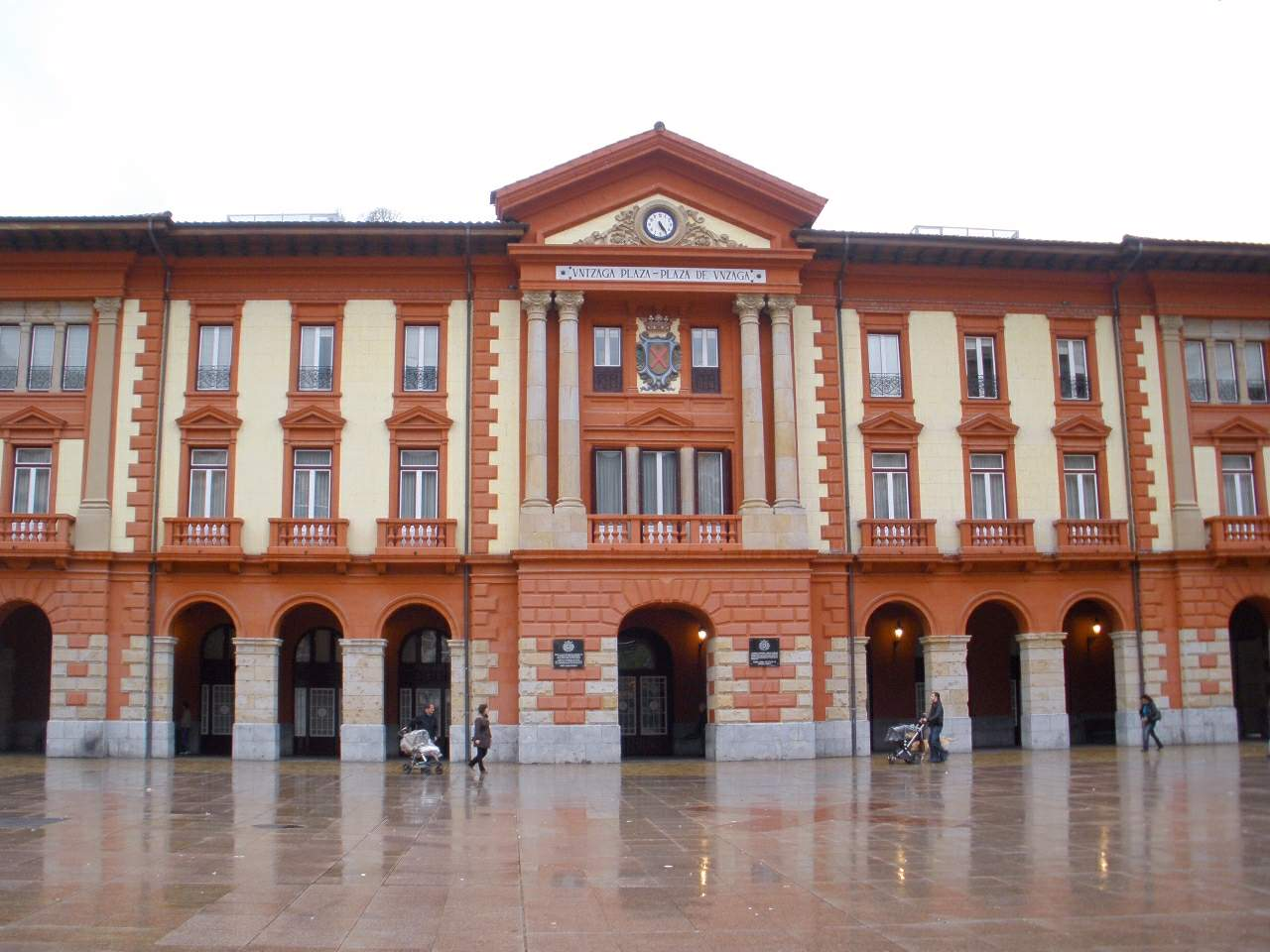
City Hall

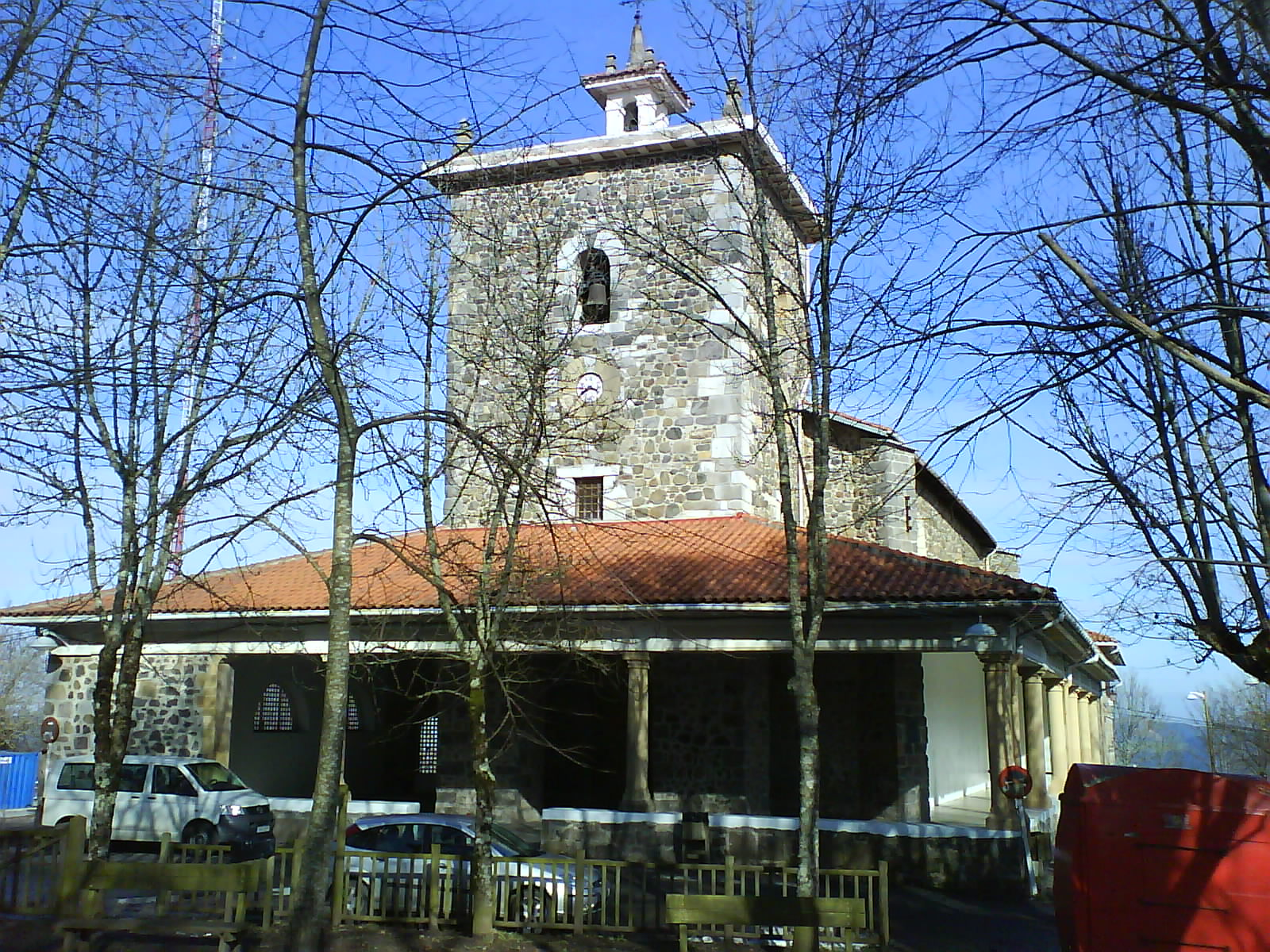
Sanctuary of Arrate

== Transport ==
Road

The AP-8 motorway connecting Bilbao and the French border crosses through Eibar, as does the N-634 road running parallel to it. The AP-1 motorway connects Eibar and Vitoria-Gasteiz. AP-8 and AP-1 meet at the Maltzaga motorway junction located in the east of Eibar.

Regular and frequent bus services under Lurraldebus connect Eibar to neighbouring towns, San Sebastián, Vitoria-Gasteiz and Bilbao Airport. BizkaiBus provides regular and frequent bus services to and from Bilbao. ALSA runs a daily service to and from Madrid-Barajas Airport and Madrid.

Eibar also has an urban bus service called Udalbus.

Railway

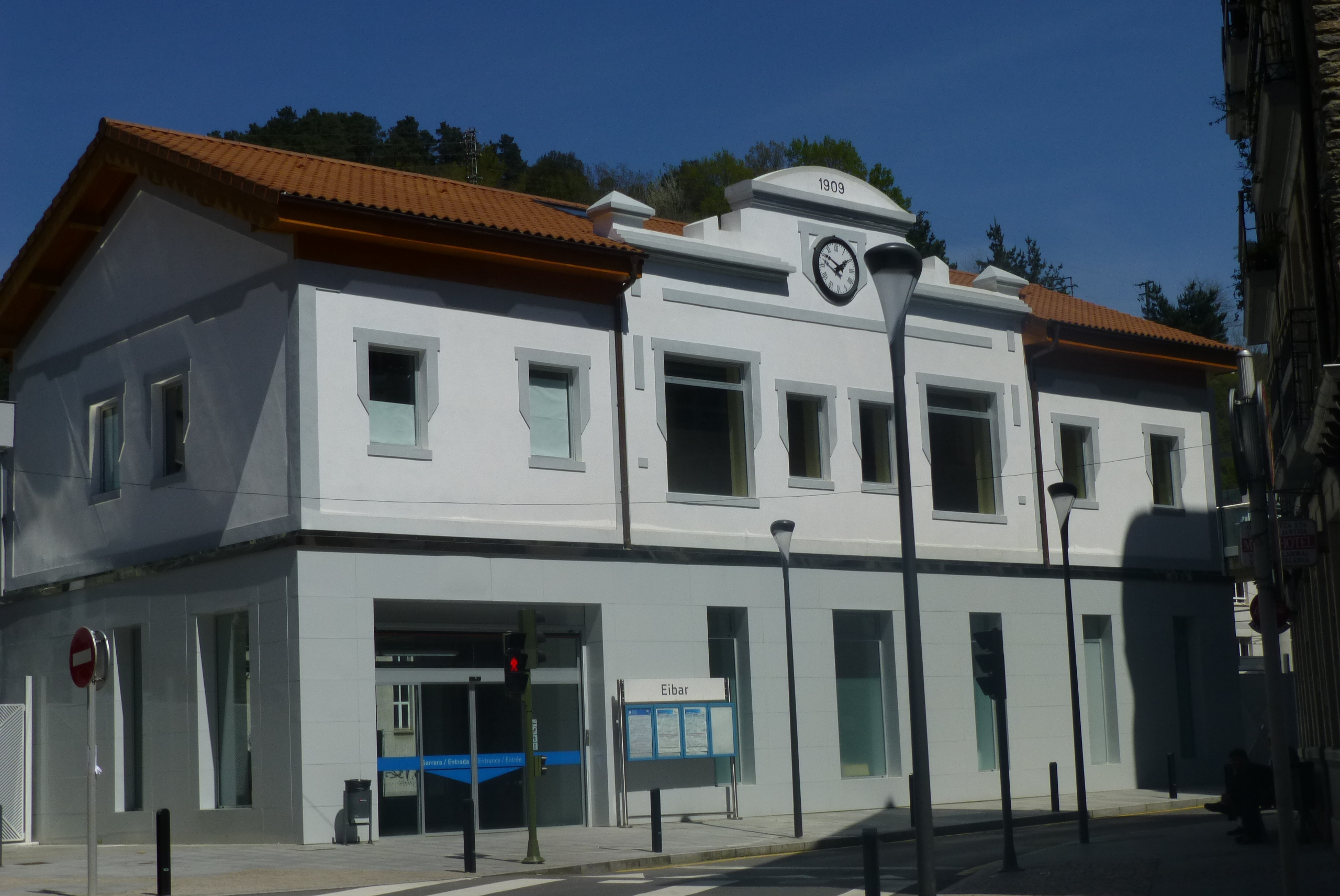
Train station

Eibar is located on the Bilbao-San Sebastián narrow gauge railway line. Trains operated by Euskotren run frequently and regularly to Bilbao-Matiko station and Donostia-Amara station. Services are more frequent in the Ermua-Eibar-Elgoibar section.

There are five stations in Eibar, from west to east: Unibertsitatea-Eibar, Amaña-Eibar, Ardantza-Eibar, Eibar and Azitain-Eibar.

== Education ==
The Gipuzkoa Faculty of Engineering of the University of the Basque Country has a campus in Eibar. The campus offers an undergraduate program in renewable energy engineering.

The Escuela de Armería, founded in 1913, is the oldest vocational training school in Spain.

== Sport ==
Football

Eibar is home to SD Eibar, who earned promotion to La Liga in the 2013-14 season. After seven seasons in the top division, it was relegated to Segunda División in the 2020–21 season. The team plays at the Ipurua Municipal Stadium.

The women's section of SD Eibar was granted promotion to the Primera División in the 2019–20 season. After two seasons in the top division, it was relegated to Primera Federación in the 2021–22 season. The team plays at the Unbe Sports Complex.

Basque pelota

The Astelena fronton, nicknamed the Cathedral of Basque Hand-pelota, is a regular venue of the hand-pelota professional circuit competitions the Bare-handed Pelota First League, the Bare-handed Pelota First League Doubles and the Cuatro y Medio Euskadi Championship.

Cycling

Since 2009, the city has hosted an annual stage finish in the Tour of the Basque Country, usually after the riders have climbed the Alto de Arrate. Before 2009, this was a traditional finish in the Euskal Bizikleta, which originated in Eibar as Bicicleta Eibarresa. The Arrate finish has also been included in the Vuelta a España in 1972, 1974, 2012 and 2020.

== Notable people ==
- Francisco de Ibarra (1539–1575), explorer and conqueror
- Martín Ignacio de Loyola (1550–1606), missionary and navigator
- Ignacio de Soroeta (?–17??), Governor of Paraguay
- Juan Antonio Mogel (1745–1804), writer
- Plácido Zuloaga (1834–1910), sculptor and metalworker
- Ignacio Zuloaga (1870–1945), painter
- Ciriaco Errasti (1904–1984), footballer
- Baltasar Albéniz (1905–1978), football manager
- Roberto Etxebarria Arruti (1908–1981), footballer
- Víctor Lecumberri (1913–2005), politician
- Miguel Gallastegui (1918–2019), Basque pelotari
- Laura Irasuegi Otal (1923–2016), Basque Niños de Rusia, Soviet trained civil engineer
- Alicia Iturrioz (1927–2021), painter
- Alberto Ormaetxea (1939–2005), footballer and football manager
- Luis Aranberri (1945–), politician and journalist
- Javier Aguirresarobe (1948–), cinematographer
- Koldo Zuazo (1956–), linguist
- Enrique Zuazua (1961–), mathematician
- Maite Zúñiga (1964–), athlete
- Pedro Horrillo (1974–), cyclist
- Patxi Usobiaga (1980–), climber
- Markel Susaeta (1987–), footballer
- Jon Errasti (1988–), footballer
- Markel Alberdi (1991–), swimmer
- Mikel Oyarzabal (1997–), footballer
- Odei Jainaga (1997–), athlete

== See also ==
- Armas Ugartechea
