= Municipal Conservatory of Sestao =

Music school in Sestao, Spain

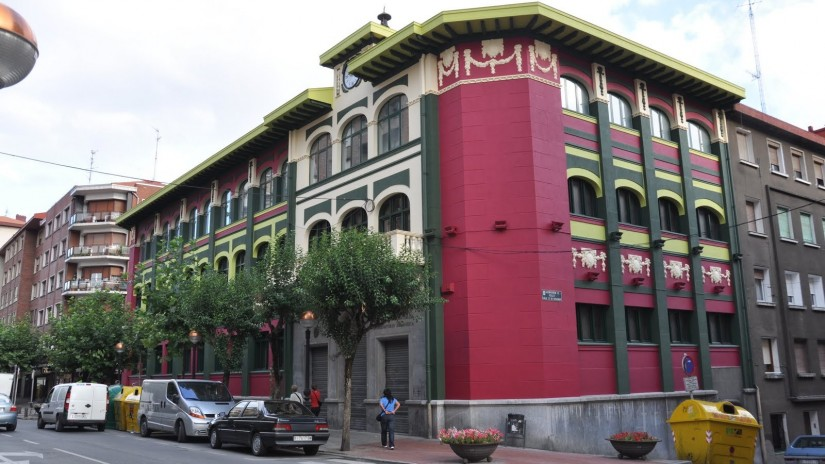
- Established: 1912; 114 years ago
- Type: Music school
- Purpose: To develop human potential through music and the arts
- Location(s): Calle Gran Vía, 13; Sestao, Biscay; Basque Country; Spain
- Region served: Basque Country
- Official language: Spanish, Basque
- Principal: Elena Bárcena (-2020); Natalia Goñi (2020-)

The Municipal Conservatory of Sestao or the Municipal Conservatory of Music of Sestao (Spanish: Conservatorio Municipal de Música de Sestao) is a Spanish teaching institution, which is devoted to music education. The present ownership belongs to the Sestao City Council.

It was founded in 1912–1914, by the Municipal Music Band of Sestao as a music school in order to equip itself with new musicians who would become part of the municipal band (for this reason it was later given the name of the director of the Municipal Band, Mr. Victor Miranda Zuazua).

Its original name is "Municipal Conservatory of Sestao" and that was its official name until the beginning of the 21st century (2000-2002).

The most famous student of the Municipal Conservatory of Sestao is Spanish-Italian violinist Felix Ayo.

== History ==
In 1890, the City Council of Sestao ordered the municipal architect, Casto de Zabala, to draw up a general plan of the municipality, an urban arrangement. Zabala drew an extension in which the main artery would be "Avenida de Sestao", which was finally inaugurated as "Gran Vía de La Vizcaya" and after the Spanish Civil War as "Gran Vía de Carlos VII" (today " Gran Vía José Antonio Agirre").

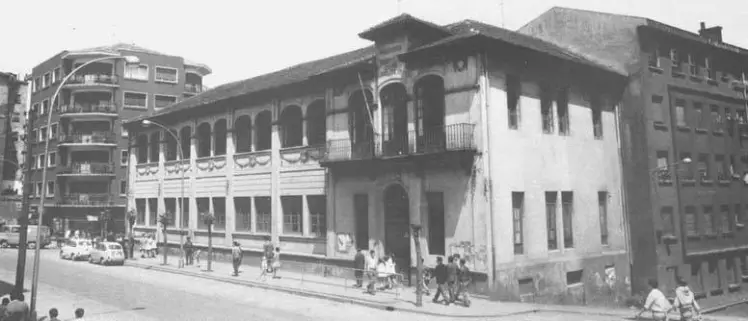
The Conservatory building, in 1920.

In 1912 the architect Santos Zunzunegui built the current building and in 1914 the Carlos VII Municipal School was inaugurated, which housed the building, a building with a classical tendency. The building was remodeled in 1987.

The building was remodeled and renovated again in 2010, acquiring its current façade.

Originally and until approximately the year 2000, the school was called "Municipal Conservatory of Sestao", but the legal reform of 1992-1998 changed the name from "Conservatory" to "School of Music".

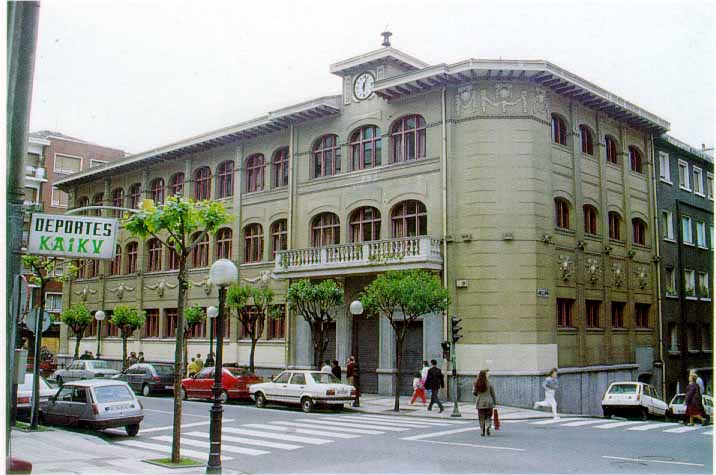
The Conservatory building, in 1994.

Currently the School bears the name of Víctor Miranda Zuazua, director of the Municipal Music Band of Sestao at the beginning of the 20th century.

== The conservatory ==
The School of Music is a teaching institution dedicated to musical education. It offers training in classical music and classical dance (ballet). The School offers training in music and dance from the age of 4. It offers training in music, musical language, music theory, singing, choir, instruments (accordion, violin, clarinet, piano...), ballet...

Musical training at the Conservatory begins at the age of 4, and later, at the age of 6, the instrument is chosen. Afterwards there are 2 years of preparatory course or preparatory stage, up to age 8. From 8 years to 12 years old, the "Elementary Music Degree" is taken (Grado Elemental, in Spanish). Then, from the ages of 12 to 16, the "Professional Music Degree" is taken (Grado Profesional Medio, in Spanish). After that the "Higher Professional Music Degree" is taken (Grado Profesional Superior, in Spanish).

The school building houses two auditoriums, one main and one secondary. They represent musical works of the school, plays or exhibit works of art and exhibitions.

== Director ==
- Elena Bárcena (-2020)
- Natalia Goñi (2020-)

== Academic staff ==
Director: Natalia Goñi

Head of studies: Verónica Bustamante

Academic staff:

- Natalia Goñi (accordion)
- Óscar Rio López (clarinet)
- José Navarro Ortí (clarinet)
- Asier Basabe (transverse flute)
- Alain Peña (guitar)
- Itxaso Musatadi (musical language/solfège)
- Raquel Moro (musical language/solfège)
- Elena Bárcena (piano)
- Blanca Gallastegui (piano)
- Victoria Blanco (piano)
- Verónica Bustamante (violin/viola)
- Michal Zienkiewicz (violin)

== Notable alumni ==
- Felix Ayo, violinist
- Rosa Lavín, pianist
- Julen Murga, accordionist
