= Felix Ayo =

Spanish-born Italian violinist (1933–2023)

- Ayo in the 1960s
- Born: Félix Ayo Losada; 1 July 1933; Sestao, Biscay, Spain
- Died: 24 September 2023 (aged 90)
- Citizenship: Spain; Italy
- Occupations: Classical violinist; Academic teacher
- Organizations: I Musici; Quartetto Beethoven di Roma; Accademia Nazionale di Santa Cecilia
- Awards: Grand Prix du disque; Edison Award

Felix Ayo Losada (1 July 1933 – 24 September 2023) was a Spanish-born Italian violinist. He was a founder of the Italian ensemble I Musici and of the Quartetto Beethoven di Roma. He played in major concert halls of the world as a soloist and especially as a chamber musician. In a career that spanned more than fifty years, he was a prolific recording artist, and an academic teacher.

His 1955 recording of Vivaldi's The Four Seasons with I Musici became a best seller, was awarded the Grand Prix du disque, and has remained a reference recording.

== Life and career ==
Félix Ayo Losada was born in Sestao, on 1 July 1933. An uncle was a violinist, and he began musical studies at the Municipal Conservatory of Sestao at age six. He continued his studies at the Municipal Conservatory of Bilbao, completing with honours at age 14. At age 16, he achieved the first prize of the Ibáñez de Betolaza Competition in Bilbao, with a scholarship to expand his studies, which he continued in Paris, Siena and Rome, where he studied at the Conservatorio di Musica Santa Cecilia with Remy Prìncipe. He became an Italian citizen.

In 1949 Ayo first played as a soloist with the Bilbao Orkestra Sinfonikoa, subsequently working with the orchestra for 60 years. In 1951, at the age of 18, he was a founder of the I Musici chamber orchestra, formed by students and former students of Rémy Principe, and remained their first violin soloist for sixteen years. Their 1955 recording of Vivaldi's The Four Seasons meant a breakthrough for the ensemble, becoming a bestseller. They played and recorded Baroque music before early music ensembles turned to the repertoire.

In 1970 Ayo formed the Quartetto Beethoven di Roma piano quartet, with Alfonso Ghedin as violist, Mihai Dancila as cellist, and pianist Carlo Bruno, because he wanted to turn to more Romantic repertoire.

=== Performances ===
Ayo played in the most important concert halls the world: Carnegie Hall, Berlin Philharmonie, Musikverein, La Scala, Teatro Colón, Teatro Real in Madrid, Festival Hall, Salle Pleyel, Suntory Hall, Bunka Kaikan, Sydney Opera House, Concertgebouw, and the Accademia di Santa Cecilia. As a soloist he played with important symphony orchestras, including those of Madrid, Copenhagen, Buenos Aires, Tokyo, and with the Australian Chamber Orchestra, the Kammerorchester Berlin, the Tokyo String Ensemble, and the Virtuosi di Roma. He collaborated with oboist Heinz Holliger, trumpeter Maurice André, and Frans Brüggen, among others.

Ayo mainly played a G. B. Guadagnini violin made in 1744, and a Gennaro Gagliano violin from 1768.

==== Quartetto Beethoven di Roma ====
The Quartetto Beethoven di Roma, with innumerable tours in Europe, Russia, USA, Canada, South America, Australia, New Zealand, Japan, etc., and a continuous presence at international festivals, has been regarded as one of the finest chamber ensembles in the world. The quartet made many recordings of piano quartets by Mozart, Beethoven, Schumann, Brahms, Fauré, and Mahler, among others, and was awarded the Premio Discografico della Critica Italiana. The players were credited with communicating in "the unified precision and purpose of long association".

=== Teaching ===
Ayo taught at the Accademia Nazionale di Santa Cecilia, and held master classes in Denmark, Germany, Italy and Spain, Australia, Canada, the United States and Japan. He was a juror for international music competitions.

=== Personal life ===
Ayo died on 24 September 2023, at age 90.

== Recordings ==
Ayo had a vast discography. He recorded Vivaldi's The Four Seasons with I Musici in 1955, remaining a reference recording. A reviewer of the CD reissue noted in 1988, that they displayed an unusual relaxed freshness, and described Ayo's playing as lyrical. The recording, marked by "unprecedented tranquility", was awarded a Grand Prix du Disque. He made a second recording of it with the group, now in stereo, of which 10 million copies were sold. With I Musici he recorded more of Vivaldi's violin concertos Corelli's concerti grossi, and works by Albinoni and Geminiani, among others. He recorded for several record labels, such as Decca, EMI Classics, Dynamic and Philips.

Ayo's recordings also included Bach's Brandenburg Concertos, and Bach's works for violin solo, the sonatas and partitas. He said about the solo violin recordings: "It's the best thing I've ever done in my life and what justifies it".

He recorded eight violin sonatas by Giovanni Battista Viotti with Corrado De Bernart, described by a reviewer as compositions of "grandeur, command and virtuosity", with a "compact command of lyricism and his gift for gracious turns of phrase"; he notes Ayo's "sweetly focused tone", summarising: "Here, in short, Viotti sings." Ayo's late recordings include works by Tartini, Mendelssohn and Turina.

== Awards ==
Ayo's recordings won international recognition, winning many prizes including the Preis der Deutschen Schallplattenkritik, the Edison Prize, the Mar del Plata prize, the Grand Prix du disque for his now historic version of The Four Seasons, and the prize awarded by Italian Record Critics for the Beethoven piano quartets. He was awarded the Premio Roma and the Premio San Michele for his dedication to music.
