= Confederation of Cooperative Companies of the Basque Country =

- Confederación de Cooperativas de Euskadi-Euskadiko Kooperatiben Konfederazioa
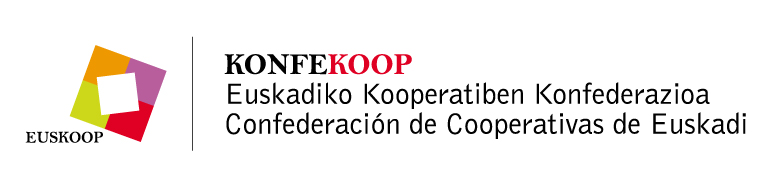
- Chairperson: Rosa Lavín
- Website: https://konfekoop.coop/

The Confederation of Cooperative Companies of the Basque Country (Spanish: Confederación de Cooperativas de Euskadi; Basque: Euskadiko Kooperatiben Konfederazioa) is a Basque institution founded in 1996 that represents the social economy business community of the Basque Country.

Its current chairperson is Rosa Lavín.

== Organization ==
The business organization was created in 1996 and brings together and represents all the sector of Basque social economy businesses (employers' organization).

The organization represents more than a thousand social economy corporations, including: banking entities, credit companies, labor, associated work and others, among them the largest is the Mondragon Corporation.

== Chairperson ==
- Rosa Lavín (2015-)

== See also ==
- Confederación Empresarial de Economia Social
- Confederación Española de Organizaciones Empresariales
