= Nemesio Pozuelo =

Soviet footballer (1940–2026)

Nemesio Nemesyevich Pozuelo (Russian: Немесио Немесьевич Посуэло; 7 July 1940 – 28 May 2026) was a Soviet footballer who was a forward. He was awarded the Master of Sports of the USSR in 1963.

== Biography ==
Nemesio Pozuelo was born in Kharkov, Ukrainian SSR, USSR, the son of Spanish refugees. His father was a member of the Central Committee of the Communist Party of Spain. His mother died of cancer when Pozuelo was seven years old. He then moved between orphanages in Bolshevo, Yevpatoria and Ivanovo and started playing football at an orphanage in Ivanovo.

He joined the youth academy of Torpedo Moscow through his father's friendship with the club's captain Agustin Gomez. He made two appearances as Torpedo won the 1960 Soviet Top League. In the second half of the 1964 season he moved to the Spartak Moscow. He spent one year there, scoring 3 goals in 13 appearances, one of which came against Lev Yashin. He then went to Zenit Saint Petersburg in 1965. At Zenit, he made five appearances before being handed a one-year suspension for "repeated violations of team discipline". He did not return to playing but received a lifetime ban from football after he was accused of having had a drinking session with Spartak forward Yury Sevidov before Sevidov hit and killed a pedestrian with his car.

In 1996, he returned to Spain, to the city of Velilla de San Antonio. He worked as a coach at a children's school.

Pozuelo died on 28 May 2026, at the age of 85.
