= Sestao =

- Municipality
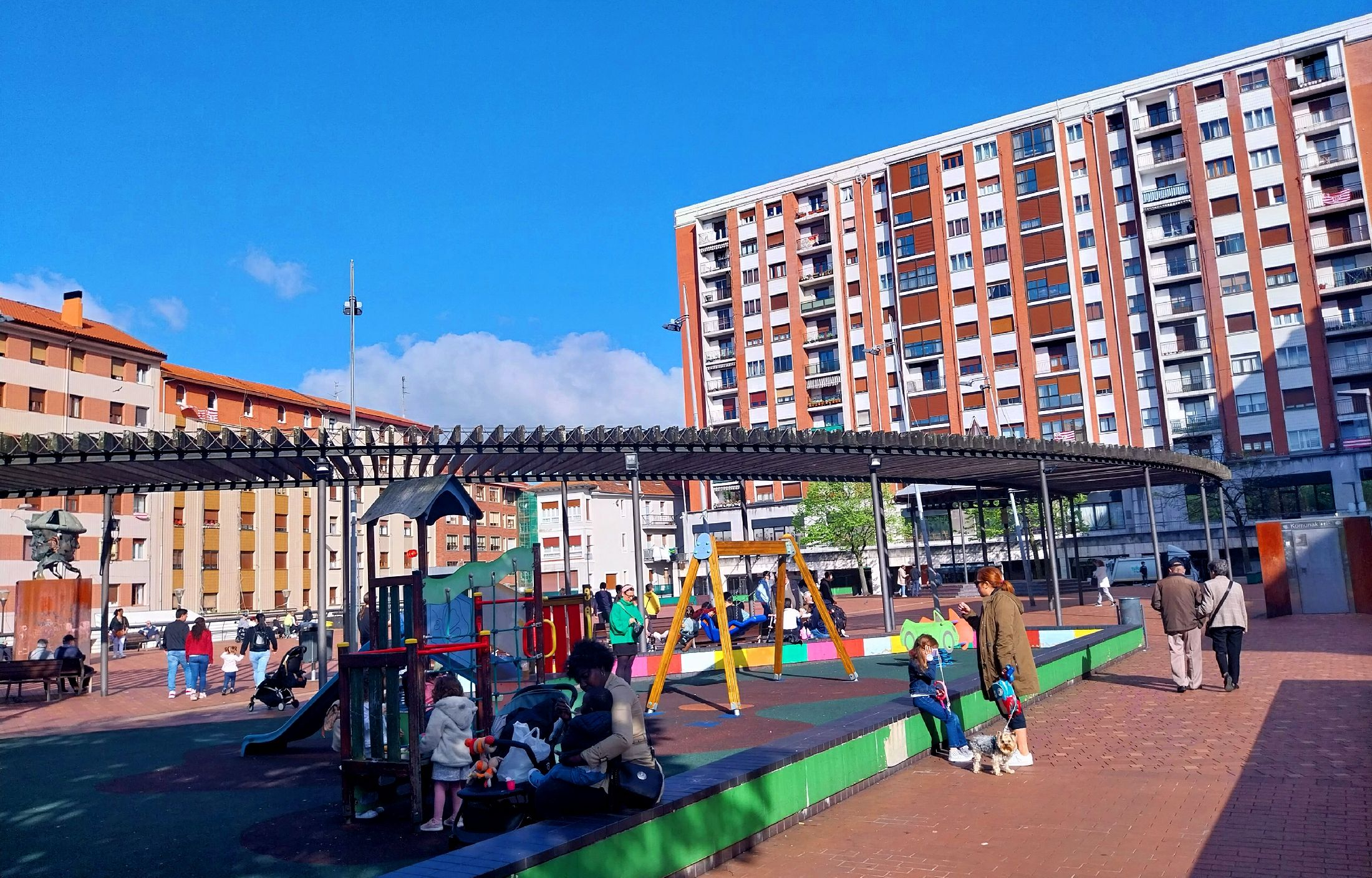
- Plaza del Kasko

- Flag Coat of arms

- Location of Sestao within the Basque Country Sestao (Spain)
- Coordinates: 43°18′39″N 3°0′20″W
- Country: Spain
- Autonomous community: Basque Country
- Province: Biscay
- Comarca: Greater Bilbao
- Segregatted: 1805

Government
  - Alcalde: Ainhoa Basabe Meléndez (EAJ-PNV)

Area
  - Total: 3.58 km^{2} (1.38 sq mi)
- Elevation: 68 m (223 ft)

Population (2025)
  - Total: 28,473
  - Density: 7,950/km^{2} (20,600/sq mi)
- Demonym: sestaotarra
- Time zone: UTC+1 (CET)
  - Summer (DST): UTC+2 (CEST)
- Postal code: 48910
- Official language(s): Basque
- Website: Official website

Sestao is a town and municipality in the province of Biscay in the autonomous community of the Basque Country in northern Spain. It is in the left bank of the Estuary of Bilbao and part of Bilbao's metropolitan area. It has 28,473 inhabitants.

Sestao was the place of the most important steel industry of Biscay, Altos Hornos de Vizcaya.

== Neighbourhoods ==
Sestao is administratively divided into 13 neighbourhoods or wards:

- Kasko (Basque: Gaisko)
- Kueto (Basque: Goitio)
- Galindo (Basque: Gariondo)
- Albiz
- Urbinaga
- Rebonza (Basque: Urrebontza)
- Azeta
- Simondrogas (Basque: Zumarrondoaga)
- Txabarri (Basque: Etxabarri)
- Markonzaga
- Aizpuru
- Los Baños (Basque: Mañueta)
- Las Llanas (Basque: Oyana)

== Demographics ==
As of 2025, the population is 28,473, of which 48.4% are male, and 51.6% are female. Minors make up 14.1% of the population, and seniors make up 24.7%.

Historical population

Year	Pop.	±%
1857	384	—
1877	1,074	+179.7%
1887	3,499	+225.8%
1900	10,234	+192.5%
1910	11,699	+14.3%
1920	15,722	+34.4%
1930	17,755	+12.9%
1940	17,950	+1.1%

Year	Pop.	±%
1950	19,298	+7.5%
1960	23,241	+20.4%
1970	37,345	+60.7%
1981	40,374	+8.1%
1991	35,948	−11.0%
2001	31,773	−11.6%
2011	28,805	−9.3%
2021	27,321	−5.2%

Source: INE

=== Immigration ===
As of 2025, immigrants make up 19.4% of the population. The 5 largest foreign countries of birth are Morocco, Colombia, Paraguay, Venezuela, and Nicaragua.

== Rehabilitation of Sestao ==
Sestao, an industrial area in disuse placed in the province of the Basque Country (Spain), is located in the estuary of Bilbao. It appeared due to diverse economic, social and political forces, but it was the economic strength of the iron industry that proved to be the most important. Over the last 20 years the city of Bilbao has transformed its riverbanks, pursuing urban, environmental and economic improvement. The recovery of these old industrial spaces and the relocation of port activities to the outer bay will allow the city to face its river front and start a general process of urban transformation. The spaces previously occupied by the shipyards, containers or blast furnaces, are to become promenades, parks, art galleries, new neighborhoods and areas of business of high environmental quality.

== 1:700.000 National scale ==
The industrial crisis of the 80 affected greatly Bilbao. The closure and modernization of major industries was a major impact on the whole environment of the river and, at the same time, an opportunity to recover valuable land for urban development of the city. The transformation of the city is creating an economic structure focused on services, culture and new industries. The river banks are now serving an urban strategy for environmental and economic improvement. The estuary is therefore the backbone of the area, but it is also a strong barrier that separates both margins of the river: one with a much more industrial character and another one much more residential. Sestao is the area that links all this area that will propose a real integral operation of all this area.

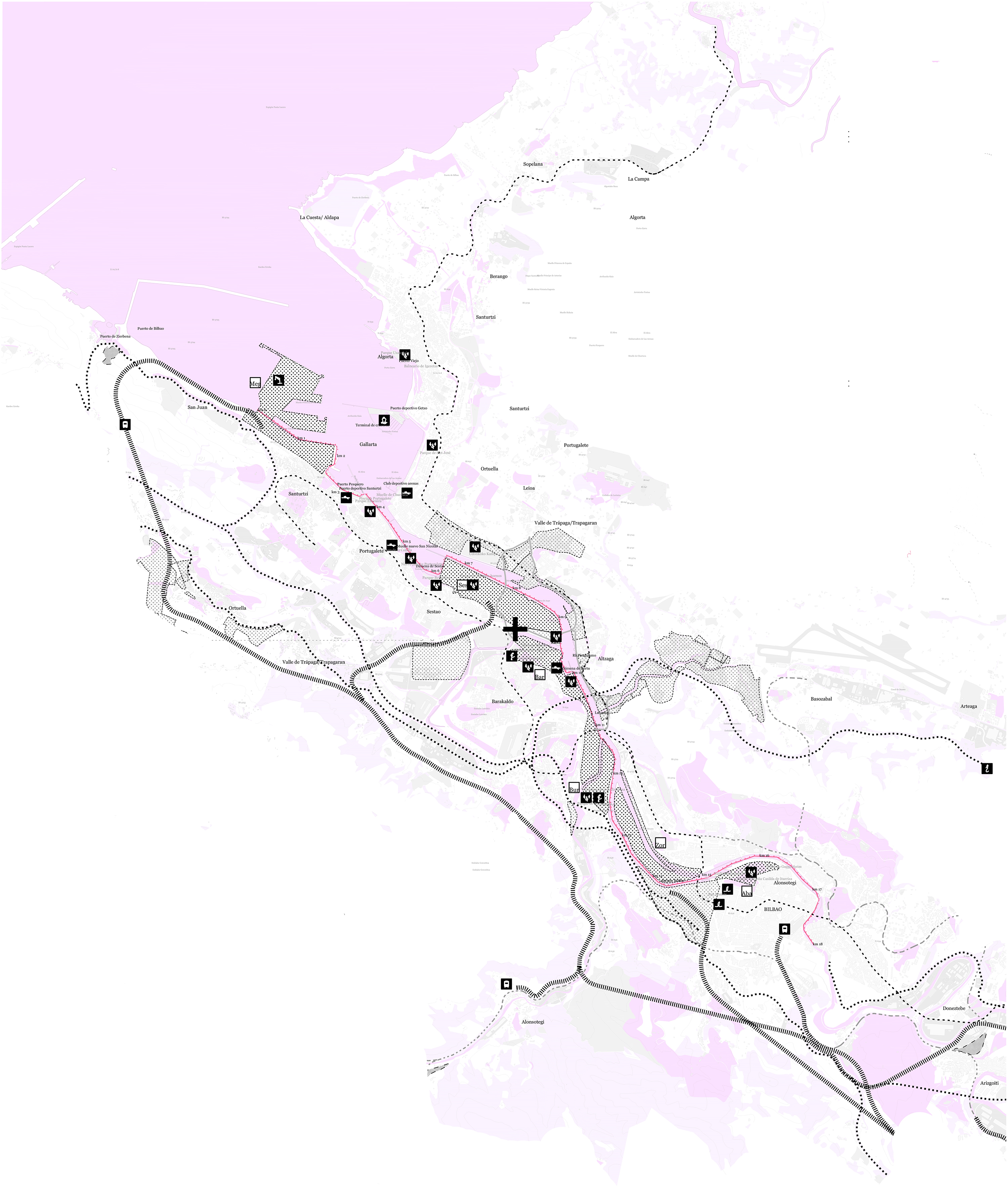

== 1:150:000 Regional scale ==
Although the area seems isolated, thanks to the station Urbinaga, it is perfectly integrated in the network of Metro Bilbao, connecting Bilbao with the Right Bank and Left, offering an essential service to the future citizens of "La Punta".

== 1:15:000 Urban scale. Evolution of area through time ==
=== Redensification ===
La Punta is an abandoned edge of the town. Sestao has the highest unemployment rate in the Basque Country, due to the closure of large companies because of their restructuring; despite this fact it has no social facilities to help this portion of the population to improve. Comparing the residential areas of Sestao and Barakaldo with "La Punta", it seems necessary to densify this area and thus strengthen the bond between Barakaldo and Sestao, and the relationship with the right bank of the river.

=== Urban barriers ===
The growth of the town of Sestao is limited by the lack of developable land and severely limited by natural and artificial barriers. For this reason, it has reached a highly densified town with a network of small open spaces. Historically, The grew of the population was a consequence of the development of the industry, and not the industry a consequence of the human presence in the area. This defines the DNA of Sestao. It is a settlement that is born exclusively by the implantation of the heavy industry. Consumption and land distribution is based on the industry (now there is more floor dedicated to industrial than residential uses) and these industrial areas are located in the best situations the city. The margin facing the estuary is colonized exclusively for industry, and the least quality areas (up to sixty meters of altitude) is intended to construction of workers' housing.

=== Natural Processes ===
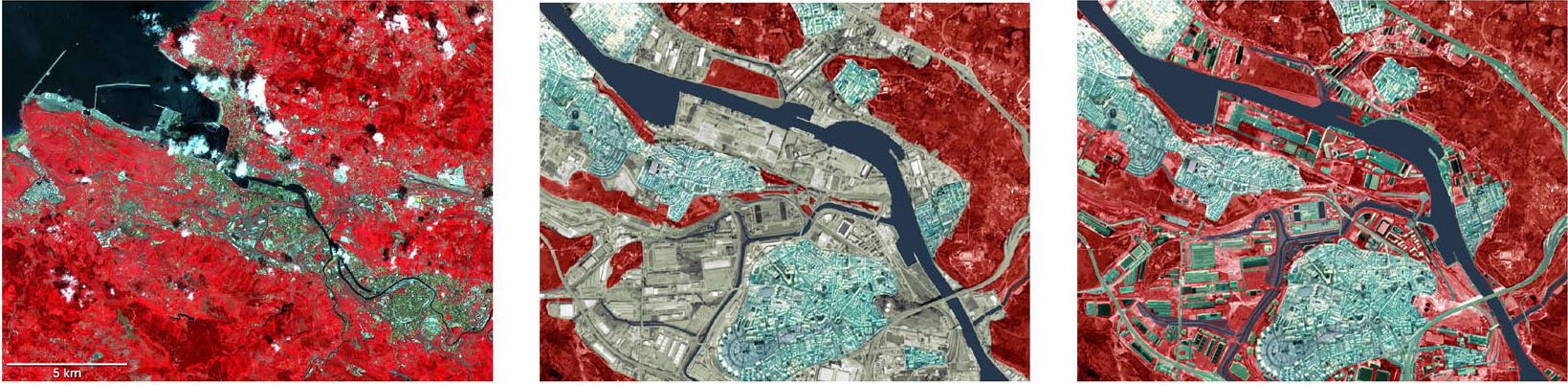

It is proposed that over time the vegetation in the low-lying industrial areas of the Galindo River estuary is slowly restored to a healthy state by actively cultivating the growth of plants that are naturally resistant to local soil contamination, and that improve soil and water quality through bio-remediation. Rather than a tabula rasa to be integrated into the city with a false topography, the industrial areas of Bilbao are in a new natural equilibrium condition. Working with these new natural conditions offers the possibility of an urbanism that combines urban and natural and responds to the fluctuations of the natural ecosystem of the river.

Since the appearance of the industry in 1875, the whole estuary became involved in the configuration of an industrial point of reference in the Spanish national scene of heavy industries. Meanwhile, the municipality of Sestao created the largest industrial base of the country.

== Regeneration strategies ==
=== Network of public spaces ===
The city will probably develop a system of small public spaces that provide residents moments of pause, rest, interactions and connections between the different urban levels.

=== Connection ===
Connection of both margins of the river.

=== Facilities ===
Program associated with the estuary and the existing water activity (Kaiku drifters).

=== Viewpoints ===
Recovery of the convent as a viewpoint. The view shows the contrast between the industrial landscape lined by shipyard cranes and the historic mansions of the Basque bourgeoisie.

=== Tram ===
Integration of the tram connected to Bilbao and the right bank of the river.

=== Rehabilitation ===
Rehabilitation of ships in better condition to include public program to allow the language of industrial structures: from jetties, cranes, pipes, and temporary stairs to pylons.

=== Housing and facilities ===
Housing and facilities of social nature.

== Notable people ==
- Félix Ayo, violinist
- Justo Balerdi, also known as: "Robert Bruce"(!), SAS soldier (3 Sqn., 2 SAS regt.) killed in Operation Tombola, in Italy.
- Vicente Uribe, Minister of the Government of Spain
- Rosa Lavín, businesswoman
- Josu Calvo, astrophysicist
- Unai Núñez, footballer
- Araceli Sánchez Urquijo (1920–2010), Niños de Rusia child evacuee during Spanish Civil War, first woman to work as a civil engineer in Spain.
- Santiago Urquiaga, footballer

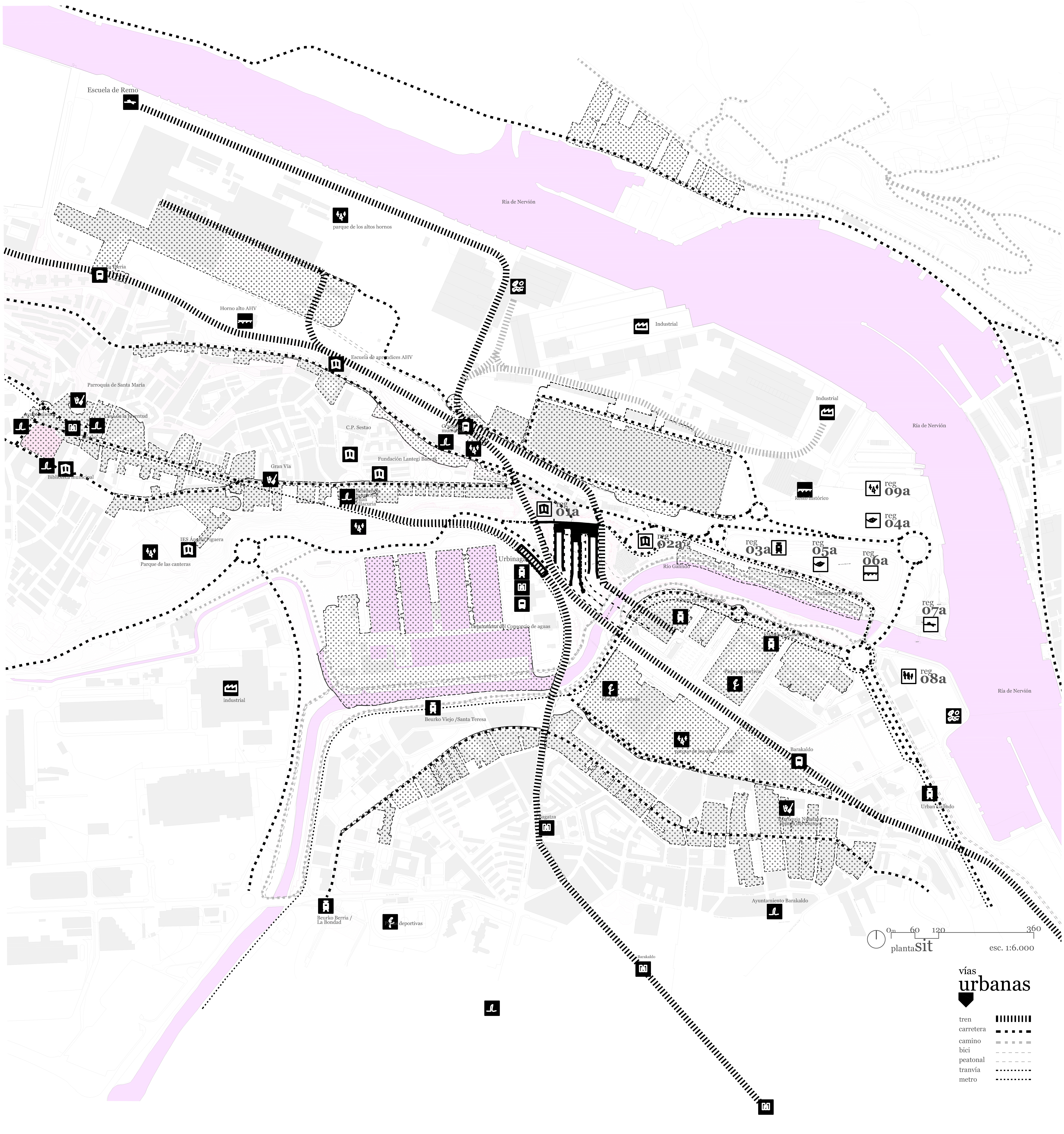

== Sources and citations ==
- Soriano, Federico (2007), FISURAS 14
- VV.AA., Diccionario Metapolis de Arquitectura Avanzada, ACTAR, 2002
- Rehabilitación de la Ría de Bilbao. PFC, VVAA. Universidad Politécnica de Madrid. 2014
- VV.AA., PGOU Plan General de Organización Urbana de Sestao, 2010
- VVAA, Slow Urbanism, Sestao. Europan 11, 2011
