= Araceli Sánchez Urquijo =

First female civil engineer practitioner in Spain

- Born: 17 February 1920; Sestao
- Died: 2010 (aged 90); Cabuérniga
- Occupation: civil engineer

Araceli Sánchez Urquijo (17 February 1920 – 2010) was a Niños de Rusia child evacuee during the Spanish Civil War and the first woman to work as a civil engineer in Spain.

== Early life ==
Araceli Sánchez Urquijo was born in Sestao in the Basque Country on 17 February 1920. Her parents were Jesusa Urquijo Aldasoro (1895–1984) and Benito Sánchez Garcia (1899–1959). She was the second of five children, with an elder sister Isabel, and younger siblings Oscar, Begoña and Esteban.

== Evacuation to the Soviet Union ==
Between 1937 and 1938, thousands of children living in Republican held areas during the Spanish Civil War were evacuated abroad to save them from the dangers and deprivations of war as the Francoist troops encroached on their home areas. 2,895 children, mostly from the Basque Country, Asturias and Cantabria, were evacuated to the Soviet Union. They became known as the Niños de Rusia. Araceli Sánchez Urquijo was amongst the children who were chosen to go, leaving Spain from the port of Santurtzi in 1937. She sailed on the Habana from the port of Santurtzi on 13 June 1937, initially to Bordeaux. She was classed as a monitor because at 17 years old she was slightly too old to be evacuated as a minor, classed as between 1 and 16 years. The Habana was escorted by a Royal Navy ship, which meant that, despite a tense encounter with a Francoist navy ship, they were finally allowed to continue their voyage, with 4,500 children on board. At Bordeaux, 1,495 children transferred onto the merchant ship Sontay, destined for the port of Leningrad, which they reached after a seven-day voyage. The Sontay had an Asian crew, so communications were difficult because of the language barrier. The children travelled in the holds, in unfit conditions, and arrived in Leningrad dirty, with lice, colds or pneumonia. Araceli Sánchez Urquijo later remembered "rats as big as cats" in the holds. The children were immediately seen by medical professionals. The evacuation was the second to go to the USSR. Laura Irasuegi Otal also travelled on the ship and would go on to become a Soviet trained Spanish civil engineer.

The Niños de Rusia were largely welcomed and well cared for in Russia, living in Las Casas de Niños, large children's houses. They were mostly educated in Spanish and taught to appreciate Spanish culture but using the Soviet method. Some of the children were encouraged to learn to speak Russian but not all learned it. The presence of the children was seen by the Soviet Union as a way of publicly supporting the future Spanish socialist republic which they hoped would emerge from the Civil War by caring for the next generation of their political elite.

Araceli Sánchez Urquijo was settled in a Casas de Niños in Leningrad and was impressed by the quantity of toys available, but even more so by the length of the days due to the city's northern latitude. She later recalled her early years in Russia as the happiest of her life.

The onset of the Second World War led to the children's houses being closed, the children being moved to more barrack like accommodation and integrated into Soviet schools. The invasion by the Nazi army put the Spanish children in danger and they suffered extreme hardship and deprivation alongside the wider Soviet population.

There had been calls for the repatriation of the children to Francoist Spain since the late 1930s. They were not allowed to return to Spain as the diplomatic relationships between the two countries had foundered with the war, even though the Soviet leader Joseph Stalin now found the children's presence embarrassing.

== Education ==
After the Second World War, most of the surviving Niños de Rusia settled in or near Moscow. Many were no longer children and were trained for careers. Araceli Sánchez Urquijo was one of 23 Spaniards (including 5 women) were among the first 45 hydropower engineers trained at the University of Moscow. In 1949 she graduated as a civil engineer specialising in hydraulics from the Moscow Power Engineering Institute. She later said "I owe everything to Russia and that I have had a hard time ... What I did would have been impossible for a woman in Spain."

== Career ==
Araceli Sánchez Urquijo began her career as an engineer working in Uzbekistan. For five years she worked in Central Asia building hydraulic power plants and power lines and was promoted to the sub-direction of a technological department.

With the death of Stalin in 1953, diplomatic relations between Spain and the Soviet Union thawed a little and negotiations were reopened around the repatriation of the Niños de Rusia exiled during the Spanish Civil War.

An agreement was reached which allowed the exiles to return to Spain and at the end of 1956, Sánchez returned to Spain in the first wave of now adult Niños de Rusia, leaving on a ship from Odessa and arriving in Valencia. The returnees were welcomed by a large crowd, the press and the authorities. Her reunion with her family after nearly twenty years apart was "bittersweet and deeply emotional". Both her father and her sister, who had been a nurse in the war, had been imprisoned for their beliefs and work on behalf of the Basque people.

The arrival back in Spain was difficult for most of the Niños de Rusia. They were held in suspicion as being left wing Soviet sympathisers or spies by the right wing Francoist regime. Their educational and professional qualifications were not in Spanish and were not considered to be of a similar quality as Spanish qualifications, so they struggled to get jobs they were qualified for. Sánchez was subjected to interrogations by the Political-Social Brigade and American security and intelligence agents.

In 1957 Sánchez applied to work at the Isodel Sprecher engineering company in the Calle de Áncora in Madrid which specialised in the manufacture of electrical equipment and installation of production plants. As she attempted to enter the front door for her interview, the security guard told her "Cleaning women can only enter the factory when the workers have left". He is said to have been very surprised when he discovered that the woman in front of him was an engineer and one of the five candidates for the position on offer. The applicants underwent three tests and Sánchez scored four points above the second best placed candidate. Isodel's founder and director Clemente Cebrián Martínez (1908–2000), did not hesitate and appointed Sánchez. She later recalled "The engineers who competed with me did not want to accept the result. They rudely insulted me, denounced me to the General Directorate of Security for being a communist and requested that I be expelled from Spain." Despite their very different political beliefs, (Cebrián was a capitalist and respected by Franco's right wing regime) he supported and defended Sánchez in her work as the cutting edge engineering she had been involved with in the Soviet Union was invaluable to his business. She was appointed head of the Isolux project department, and was eventually in charge of more than 150 professionals. When engineers from other countries visited the company, Cebrián enjoyed introducing her as "This is the engineer Sánchez: she is a woman and a communist" to which she would reply with a smile that she was not a communist but a Marxist. Sánchez's qualifications were in Russian and she had not learned technical Spanish, so she developed her own Russian-Spanish engineering dictionary, whilst being careful not to show any misunderstandings to her colleagues.

She was prohibited from leaving Spain and was not allowed a passport until 1975, after the death of Franco, which did present issues working in an international marketplace. Her work at Isodel involved adapting projects for the construction of hydraulic, electric, thermal and nuclear power plants. For several months she worked with Ernesto Botella, (father of Ana Botella, the first female Mayor of Madrid and father-in-law of former Spanish president José María Aznar) who was the head of workshops and wanted her in his department because he knew about her technological expertise. Her first two years were a continuous tussle with other engineers, as she described the plans they drew up as "a disaster and I returned them with the corresponding notes and corrections”.

In the mid-1960s, the multinational Kellogg's Corporation launched a competition for the Repsol refinery electrical project in Puertollano. Sánchez sent a project proposal with hundreds of plans to their London office. A few days later a telegram was received at Isodel requesting the presence of the engineer Sánchez in London. It was the first time that the company had won an international competition and Clemente was delighted. However, Franco threatened to shut the Isodel company down if Sánchez left Spain. Fortunately the Kellogg engineers were sufficiently impressed to travel to Spain instead and Isodel was awarded the project.

Sánchez continued to work for Isodel until her retirement in 1987. By the time she retired she had employed 14 female draftsmen to work in her department.

== Personal life ==
She was a founder member of the Club de Amigos de la UNESCO de Madrid, and was the proud possessor of membership card number one. In retirement she became president of the Izquierda Unida Social Organization for the Elderly and maintained a busy intellectual life. She maintained her socialist views throughout her life and in an interview in 1999 summed her beliefs up as "Ser los más honrados, los más solidarios y los que más ayudamos a los trabajadores" (To be the most honest, the most supportive and the one that helps the workers the most). She appeared in a documentary about Los niños de Rusia in 2001.

Araceli Sánchez Urquijo died in Cabuérniga in 2010.

== Commemoration ==
On 27 June 2023, "Bide-ingeniaritzako euskal emakume aitzindariak” an exhibition celebrating Basque Women Pioneers of Civil Engineering, was opened at the headquarters of the College of Civil Engineering in Bilbao. It told the story of two Basque women pioneers, Araceli Sánchez Urquijo and Laura Irasuegi Otal, both “gerrako umeak” children of the war, who trained in Moscow as civil engineers, a discipline traditionally dominated by men.
