= Laura Irasuegi Otal =

Basque civil engineer, Niños de Rusia

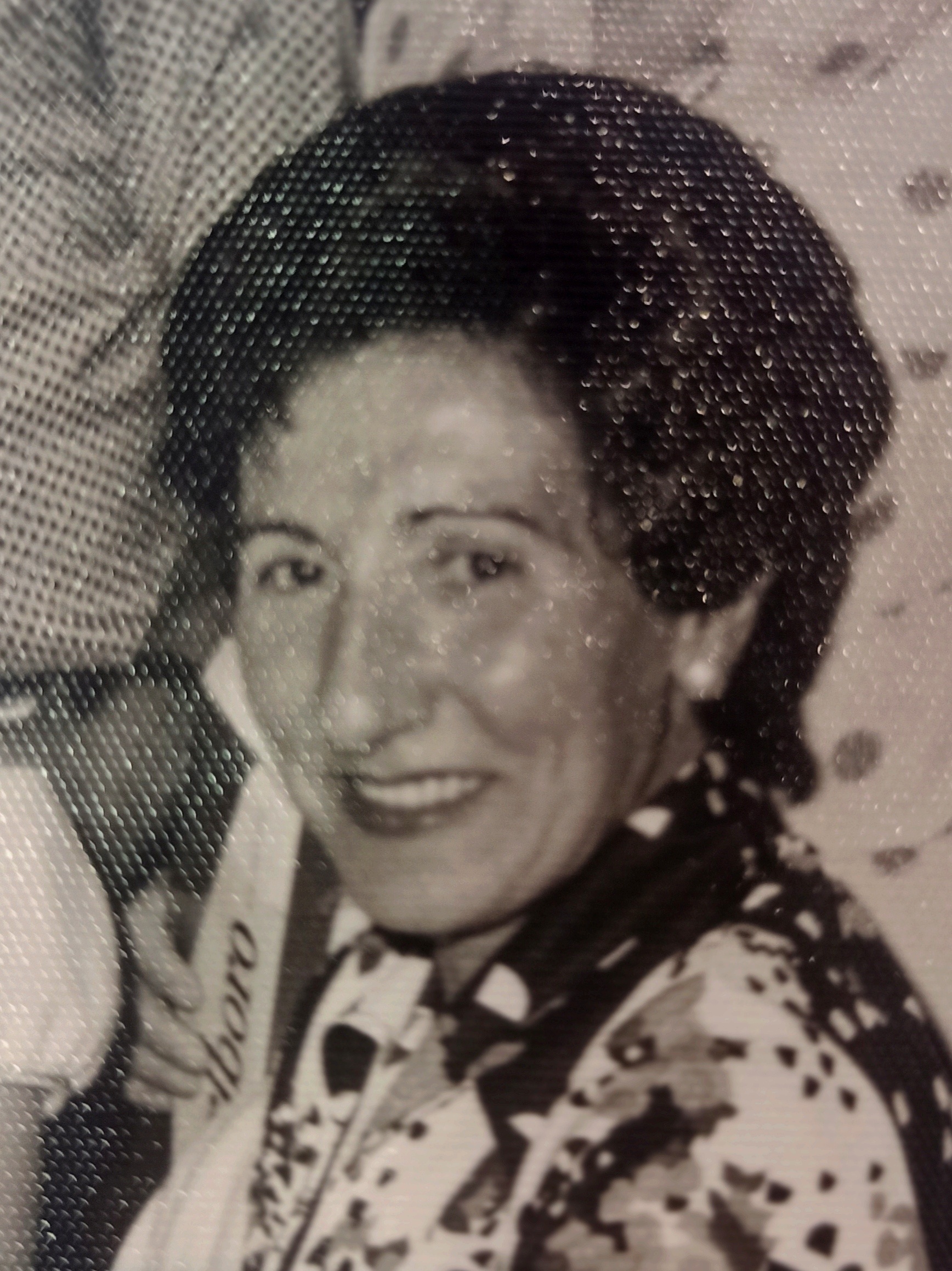
- Born: 26 November 1923; Eibar, Gipuzkoa
- Died: 6 October 2016 (aged 92); Errenteria, Gipuzkoa, Basque Country
- Occupation: Civil engineer
- Known for: Basque Niños de Rusia

Laura Irasuegi Otal (26 November 1923 – 6 October 2016) was one of the Basque Niños de Rusia (Children of Russia) who were evacuated from northern Spain during the Spanish Civil War to Soviet Russia. She survived the Siege of Leningrad and trained as a civil engineer in Moscow before returning to Spain in 1956. She became the first woman civil engineer in the Basque Country's Colegio de Ingenieros de Caminos, Canales y Puertos del País Vasco.

== Early life ==
Laura Irasuegi Otal was born in Eibar, Gipuzkoa, in what is now Basque Country in Northern Spain on 26 November 1923.

== Exile ==
The Spanish Civil War began in 1936 and conditions became very harsh in the Second Spanish Republic controlled areas, as Nationalists led by General Francisco Franco began to take the upper hand. Children at risk from the conflict were evacuated to other countries, with evacuations organised through the National Council for Evacuated Children, created for this purpose by the Spanish Popular Front government.

2,895 children, who came to be known as the Niños de Rusia (Children of Russia), were evacuated from the Republican zone to the Soviet Union during 1937 and 1938, to avoid the rigours of war. Spanish children were also evacuated to France, Belgium, United Kingdom, Switzerland, Mexico and Denmark and were referred to as Niños de la Guerra (Children of War).

Age thirteen, Laura Irasuegi Otal was selected to be one of the children evacuated. She was assigned the number 1732 and was put on the ship Habana which left the port of Santurtzi on 12 June 1937, initially sailing to Bordeaux. The Habana was escorted by a Royal Navy ship, which ensured that, despite an encounter with a Francoist navy ship, they were eventually allowed to continue their voyage, with 4,500 children on board. At Bordeaux, 1,495 children transferred onto the merchant ship Sontay, destined for the port of Leningrad, a seven-day voyage away. The Sontay had an Asian crew, and the language barrier made communications difficult. The children travelled in the holds, in unsuitable conditions, and arrived in Leningrad dirty, with lice, colds or pneumonia. Araceli Sánchez Urquijo who travelled on the same ship later recalled "rats as big as cats" in the holds. The children were immediately seen by medical professionals. The evacuation was the second to go to the USSR.

Irasuegi was settled in one of the Las Casas de Niños, large children's houses in the town of Obninsk, about 100 kilometers from Leningrad. The Niños de Rusia were largely welcomed and well cared for in Russia. They were mostly educated in Spanish and taught to appreciate Spanish culture but using the Soviet method. Some of the children were encouraged to learn to speak Russian but not all learned it. The presence of the children was seen by the Soviet Union as a way of publicly supporting the future Spanish socialist republic which they hoped would emerge from the Civil War by caring for the next generation of their political elite.

Before the start of the Second World War, Irasuegi had begun studying in Leningrad. She survived the horrors and deprivations of first year of the Siege of Leningrad. In 1942 she was part of a group of Niños de Rusia who managed to leave the city travelling across the frozen Lake Ladoga in trucks. She was taken to the Caucasus and worked to extract silk threads to make parachutes for the war effort. She eventually arrived in the Georgian city of Tbilisi.

== Studying engineering ==
When the war ended, Irasuegi was sent to Moscow and completed her civil engineering studies at the Moscow Power Engineering Institute. She married Anselmo Bárcena and they had two daughters, Cristina and Elena.

== Return to Spain ==
With the death of Stalin in 1953, diplomatic relations between Spain and the Soviet Union improved a little and negotiations began about the repatriation of the Niños de Rusia exiled during the Spanish Civil War. By 1956 an agreement had been reached to allowed the now adult Niños de Rusia exiles to return to Spain.

Irasuegi and her young family returned to Errenteria in September 1956. Her return to Spain was not an easy experience. She had to complete the conversion of her civil engineering qualifications to fit Spanish requirements, which took some years. Eventually, in 1977 after achieving her requalification, she was able to join the Colegio de Ingenieros de Caminos, Canales y Puertos del País Vasco, the first Basque woman to do so. At that time there were only two women civil engineers working in Spain, Irasuegi and fellow Niño de Rusia and Moscow Power Engineering Institute, Araceli Sánchez Urquijo.

Irasuegi had been a Basque speaker during her childhood but lost most of it during her time in Russia. On her return she did not have much chance to recover her lost Basque language, but when her nephews were born and she heard them speak Basque, she joined language classes at the age of 70 to be able to speak with them in Basque.

Laura Irasuegi died in Errenteria, Gipuzkoa, Basque Country in Northern Spain on 6 October 2016, age 92. At her funeral, a red flag was accompanied by Symphony No. 7 by Shostakovich, followed by a poem by Soviet poet Olga Bergoltz in memory of Irasuegi's survival of the Siege of Leningrad. The State Anthem of the Soviet Union was also played.

== Commemoration ==
On 27 June 2023, an exhibion "Bide-ingeniaritzako euskal emakume aitzindariak” (Basque Women Pioneers of Civil Engineering)" was opened in Bilbao, at the headquarters of the College of Civil Engineering. The exhibition demonstrated women's involvement in civil engineering, a discipline traditionally dominated by men, through the story of two Basque women pioneers, Laura Irasuegi and Araceli Sánchez, both “gerrako umeak” children of the war, who left the port of Santurtzi in June 1937 and were sent to Leningrad.
