= Rosa Lavín =

Spanish businesswoman (born 1973)

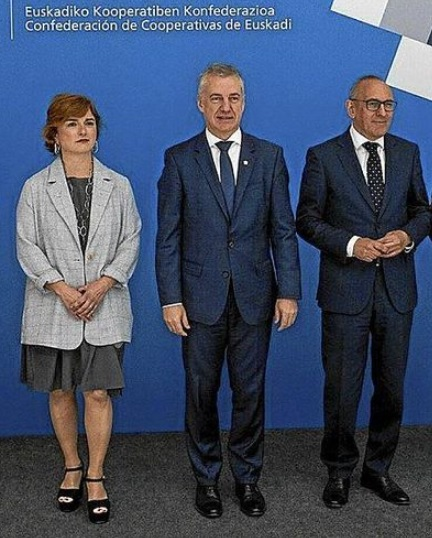
- Rosa Lavín, Iñigo Urkullu and Ramiro González

Board Member of the Spanish Confederation of Social Economy Companies
- Incumbent
- Assumed office 2022

President of Confederation of Cooperative Companies of the Basque Country
- Assuming office 2015
- Succeeding: Javier Goienetxea

President of Basque Social Economy Network
- Assuming office 2015
- Succeeding: office created

Vice-Chair of Home Care Lab
- Incumbent
- Assumed office 2011

Vice-Chair of SSI Group
- Incumbent
- Assumed office 2010

Personal details
- Born: Rosa María Lavín Ibarra; 4 November 1973 (age 52) Sestao (Basque Country); Spain
- Children: 2
- Parent(s): Rosa Mari Ibarra (mother); Manuel Lavín (father)
- Education: Merciful Love School; University of the Basque Country (Lic., PG); University of Deusto (PG); Superior Conservatory of Music
- Occupation: Executive, financial executive, businesswoman

Rosa María Lavín Ibarra (born in Sestao on 4 November 1973) is a Spanish executive and businesswoman. She is the President of the Confederation of Cooperative Companies of the Basque Country since 2015. She is the first woman to hold this position, and the first woman to lead a business organization in the Basque Country.

She was formerly president of the Federation of Cooperative Companies of Euskadi (ERKIDE), also being the first woman to hold the position.

She is also the president of the Basque Social Economy Network (EGES) since 2015, the organization that brings together all social economy companies in the Basque Country.

In addition, she is a member of the board of directors of the Spanish Confederation of Social Economy Companies (CEPES), the Spanish business organization of social economy companies.

She is also the chief financial officer (CFO), board member, and Vice-Chair of the board of directors of the business group Grupo SSI, Vice-Chair of the board of directors of Home Care Lab (HCL), and chairperson of the board of directors of Grupo SSI Silver Hub, a subsidiary of the group, among other corporate positions.

She is a member of the Working Group of Women Leaders of the Social Economy, launched in 2023 by the second vice president and Minister of Labor and Social Economy of the Government of Spain Yolanda Díaz.

== Early life and education ==
Lavín was born on 4 November 1973 in Sestao, Basque Country (Spain). She is the younger of two sisters. Her sister is also a businesswoman of the hotel industry. She attended the Merciful Love School (Colegio Amor Misericordioso Ikastetxea) in Sestao, a Basque private Catholic school, belonging to the Congregation of the Sisters Servants of Merciful Love.

She graduated from the University of the Basque Country with a licenciate degree in economics and business sciences, specializing in business administration. Later, she completed a postgraduate degree in social economy, cooperative companies and labor companies also at the University of the Basque Country. She also completed the Executive Programme in Financial Management (PEDF) at the Deusto Business School of the University of Deusto.

In addition, she also pursued musical and piano studies at the Bilbao Higher Conservatory of Music, where she completed the piano degree programme, which she studied simultaneously balancing it with her university studies, a path that ran in the family, as her mother and sister are also professional pianists who completed the same training (her mother was the church organist and a member of the parish choir).

== Career ==
Deeply connected to the Basque cooperative business sector, she dedicated herself to the business world from a young age, focusing on cooperative enterprises. In 1997 she joined Eraginkor Consulting S. Coop., a business consulting firm. In 1998 she began working in the Grupo SSI business group, in the economic-financial area.

She currently serves as chief financial officer (CFO), board member, and Vice-Chair of the board of directors of the business group Grupo SSI since 2010. She is also Vice-Chair of the board of directors of Home Care Lab (HCL), Grupo SSI’s innovation (R&D&i) division, since 2011. Furthermore, she is chairperson of the board of directors of Grupo SSI Silver Hub, a subsidiary of the group, since 2018.

Lavín also serves or has served on the board of directors of various companies and organizations. She is a member of the board of directors of ElkarLan S. Coop., a company providing advisory services for the creation of new businesses, and a member of the board of directors of Eroski (Mondragon Corporation). Additionally, she serves on the board of directors of the venture capital firm Seed Capital Bizkaia S.A., chaired at the time by Imanol Pradales, and on the board of directors of the seed capital company Hazibide, S.A.

She is a member of different business organizations and federations of cooperative companies. In 2019, she was elected president of the Federation of Cooperative Companies of the Basque Country (ERKIDE), being the first woman to hold the position. In 2020, ERKIDE became part of the Confederation of Cooperative Companies of Euskadi.

In addition, since 2015, Lavín has been the president of the Basque Social Economy Network (EGES), the platform that brings together all social economy enterprises in the Basque Country, including cooperatives, worker-owned companies, foundations, and social integration enterprises.

=== Chairperson of the Confederation of Cooperative Companies of the Basque Country ===
In 2015, Lavín was elected president of the Confederation of Cooperative Companies of Euskadi, the Basque cooperative business sector, becoming the first woman to hold this position since its creation in 1996.

In this way, Lavín took the helm of a business organization encompassing various cross-sector cooperative enterprises, including the Mondragon Corporation. A business confederation whose member companies by 2026 generated a combined turnover of €15 billion and account for approximately 10% of the Basque Country's GDP.

In this way, she presides over one of the two Basque employers' organizations (the other is the Basque Business Confederation ConfeBasque), which includes banking entities, credit companies, labor, associated work and others, among them the largests are Mondragon Corporation, ULMA Group or the banking institution Laboral Kutxa.

In 2015, when she was appointed president of the Confederation of Cooperative Companies of Euskadi, she became the first woman to lead a business organization in the Basque Country and also one of the first women to lead an employers' association in Spain.

The Confederation of Cooperative Companies of Euskadi represents all the companies of social economy in the Basque Country (it brings together almost two thousand companies), as it does the Spanish Confederation of Social Economy Companies in Spain or the Social Economy Europe in Europe.

She has appeared several times in the Basque Parliament, especially with the elaboration of the new law of cooperatives of the year 2019. She is a member of the Basque government agency Superior Council of Cooperative Companies of Euskadi and also of other councils and economic-business commissions of the Basque Government.

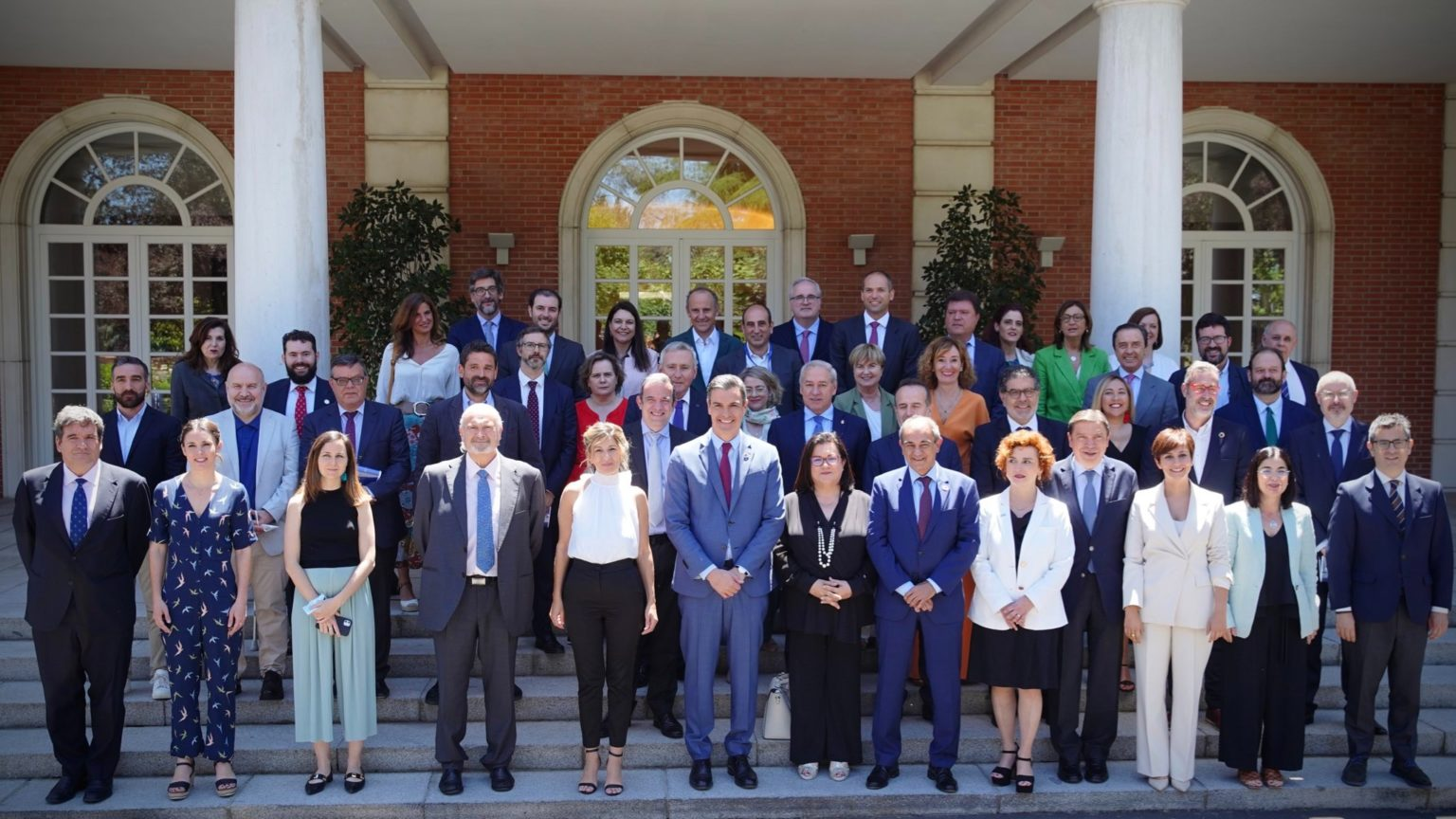
Presentation of the business PERTE at the Palace of Moncloa (Madrid 2022). In the front row, José Luis Escrivá, Ione Belarra, Yolanda Díaz, Pedro Sánchez, Patro Contreras, Juan Antonio Pedreño, Rosa Lavín, Luis Planas, Isabel Rodríguez and Félix Bolaños.

Lavín has also been involved on several occasions in the social economy business relations with the Government of Spain. In 2022, at the presentation of the Strategic Project for Economic Recovery and Transformation (PERTE) at the Palace of Moncloa (Madrid), together with Pedro Sánchez, Nadia Calviño and Yolanda Díaz, she defended the participation of cooperative companies in the elaboration of public policies.

In addition, since 2022 Lavín is also a board member of the board of directors of the Spanish Confederation of Social Economy Companies (CEPES), the Spanish employers' organization, chaired by Juan Antonio Pedreño.

She is a member of the Working Group of Women Leaders of the Social Economy, launched in 2023 by the second vice president and Minister of Labor and Social Economy of the Government of Spain Yolanda Díaz, a group of 26 women leaders in the social economy for the implementation of advances in gender equality in the social economy.

She is also a member of WeCoop Mujeres ESS, a public-private initiative co-financed by the Minister of Labour and Social Economy of the Government of Spain with the aim of bringing together women business leaders in the social economy.

Lavín, through her roles in corporate management and her leadership within business associations, serving as president of the Confederation of Cooperative Enterprises of the Basque Country and as a board member of the Spanish Business Confederation of the Social Economy, has established herself as one of the most influential leading figure in the Basque business and socioeconomic landscape. She has gained significant prominence in the corporate and business world across both the Basque Country and Spain.

She frequently contributes as a leading voice on business, corporate and cooperative issues to newspapers such as El País, El Correo, and Estrategia Empresarial.

== Personal life ==
She lives in Sestao (Basque Country). She is married and has two children. She is fond of swimming, a sport she practices frequently.

She usually spends the summers on the coast of Cantabria, in northern Spain, where the family has a summer home.

== Awards and recognitions ==
- 2023, Selected as one of the Women Leaders in the Social Economy in Spain by the Ministry of Labor and Social Economy

== Bibliography ==
- Carmen Marcuello Servós (ed.), Carmen Barragán Mendoza (ed.), Eliane Navarro Rosandiski (ed.), Juan Fernando Álvarez Rodríguez (ed.). Women, Cooperativism, and Social Economy in Spain and Latin America. International Center for Research and Information on the Public, Social, and Cooperative Economy, CIRIEC-Spain (University of Valencia). Valencia. Spain. 2021.

== See also ==
- Confederation of Cooperative Companies of the Basque Country
- Mondragon Corporation
- Iñigo Ucín
- Ana Botín
