= Karakate =

Mountain in the Basque Country, Spain

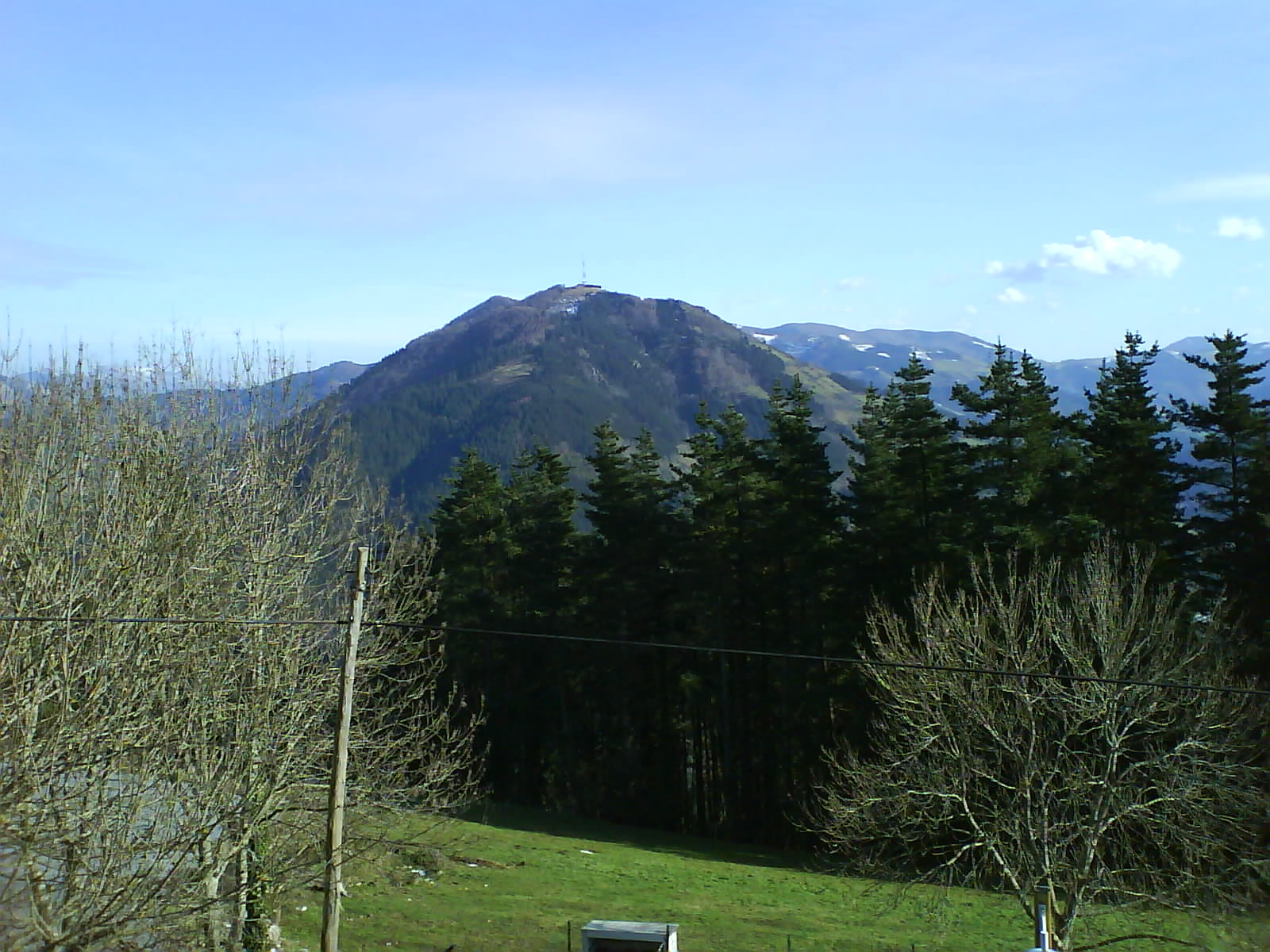
- Mount Karakate

Highest point
- Elevation: 749 m (2,457 ft)
- Prominence: 17 m (56 ft)
- Coordinates: 43°11′33″N 02°24′53″W

Geography
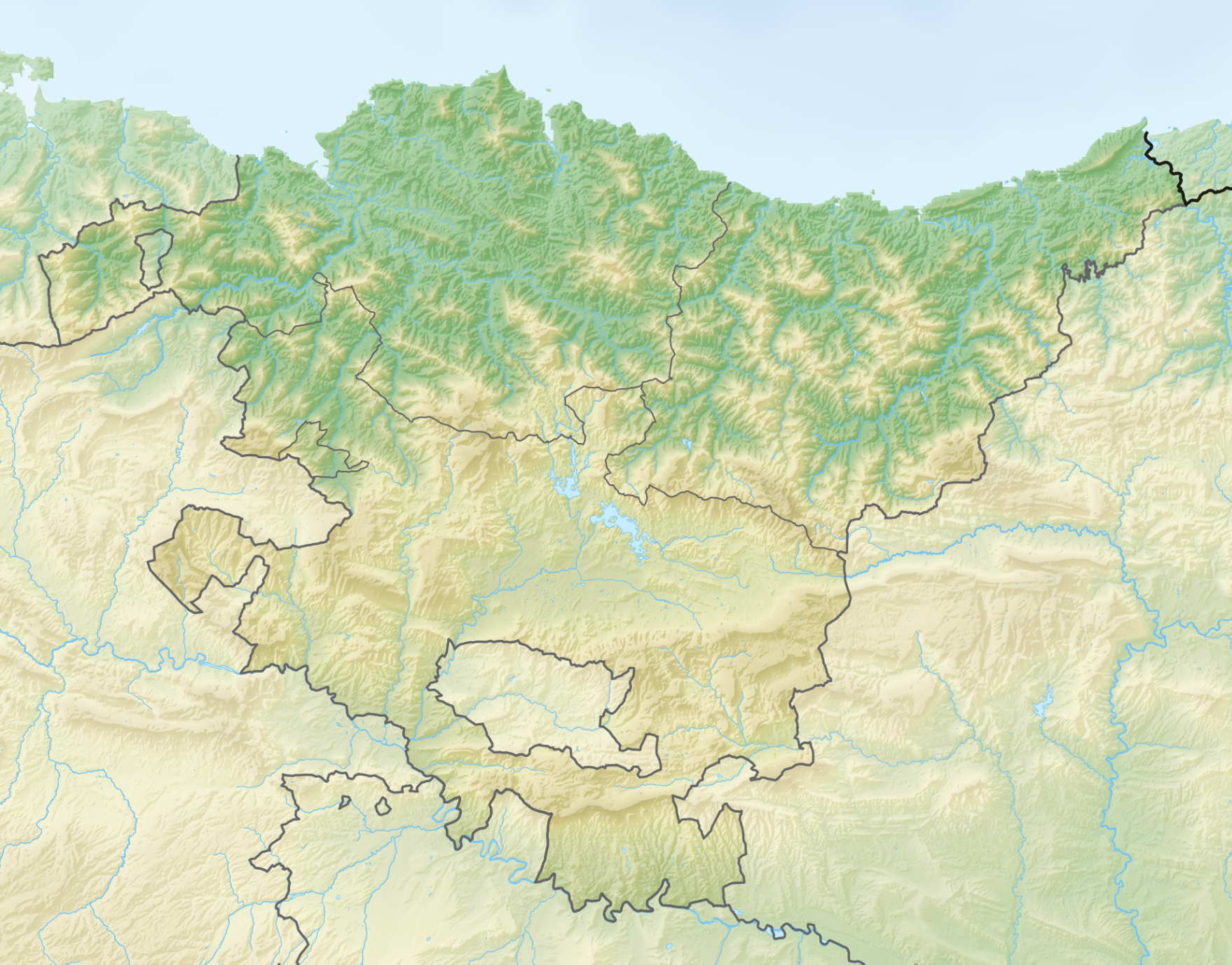
- Location within the Basque Country Location within Spain
- Location: Gipuzkoa, Basque Country, Spain
- Parent range: Irukurutzeta Range

Karakate, also known as Muneta or Kortazar, is a mountain located in the northeast of Gipuzkoa in Basque Country, Spain. It belongs to the Irukurutzeta Range of the wider Basque Mountains. The mountain has a maximum height of 749 meters.

== Archaeological site ==
In 2016, archaeologist Antxoka Martínez Velasco found vestiges of a Roman military camp at the summit of Karate. It is a small camp with defensive slope and mount.

== Galleries ==
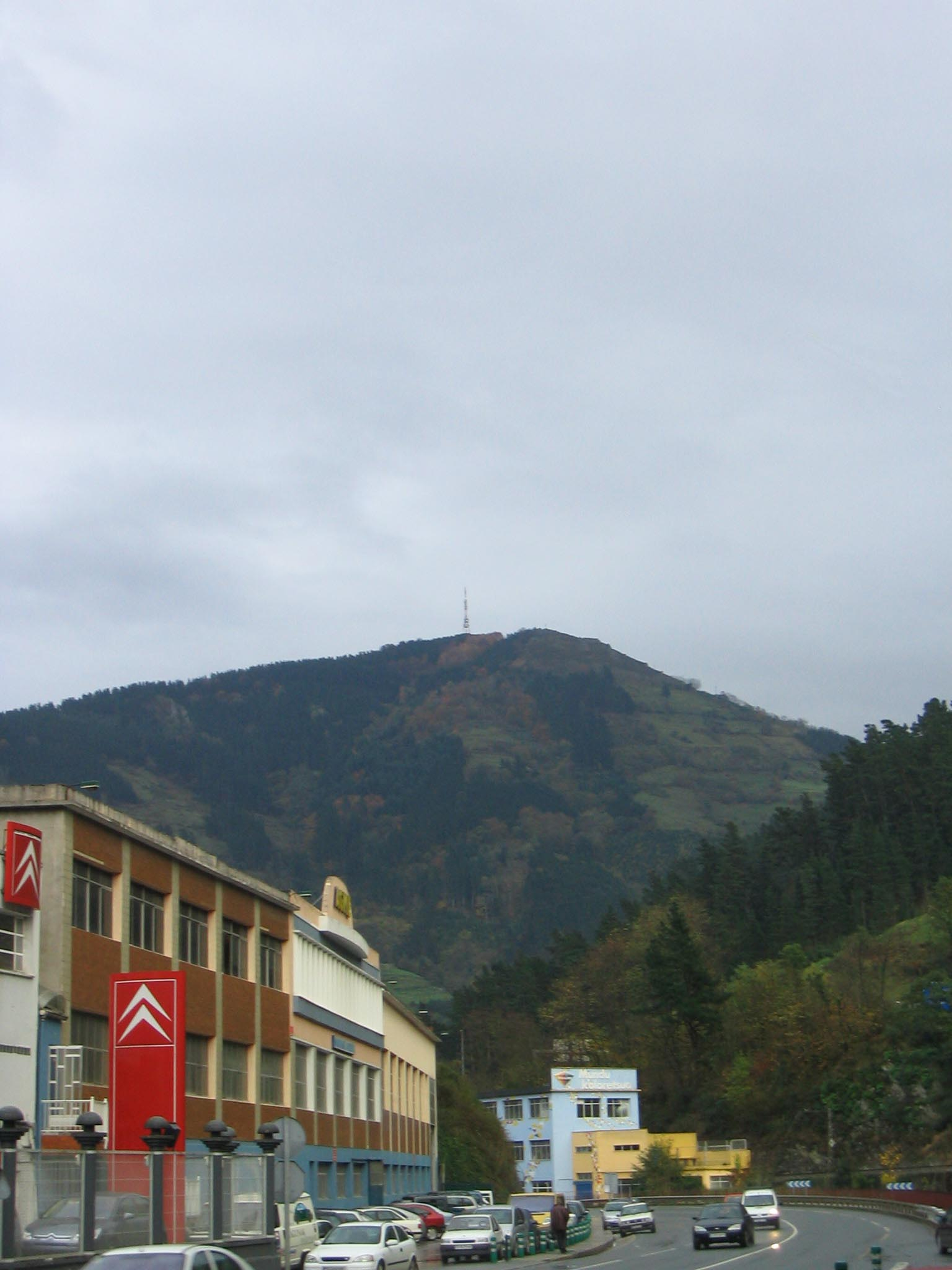
View of Karakate from Eibar

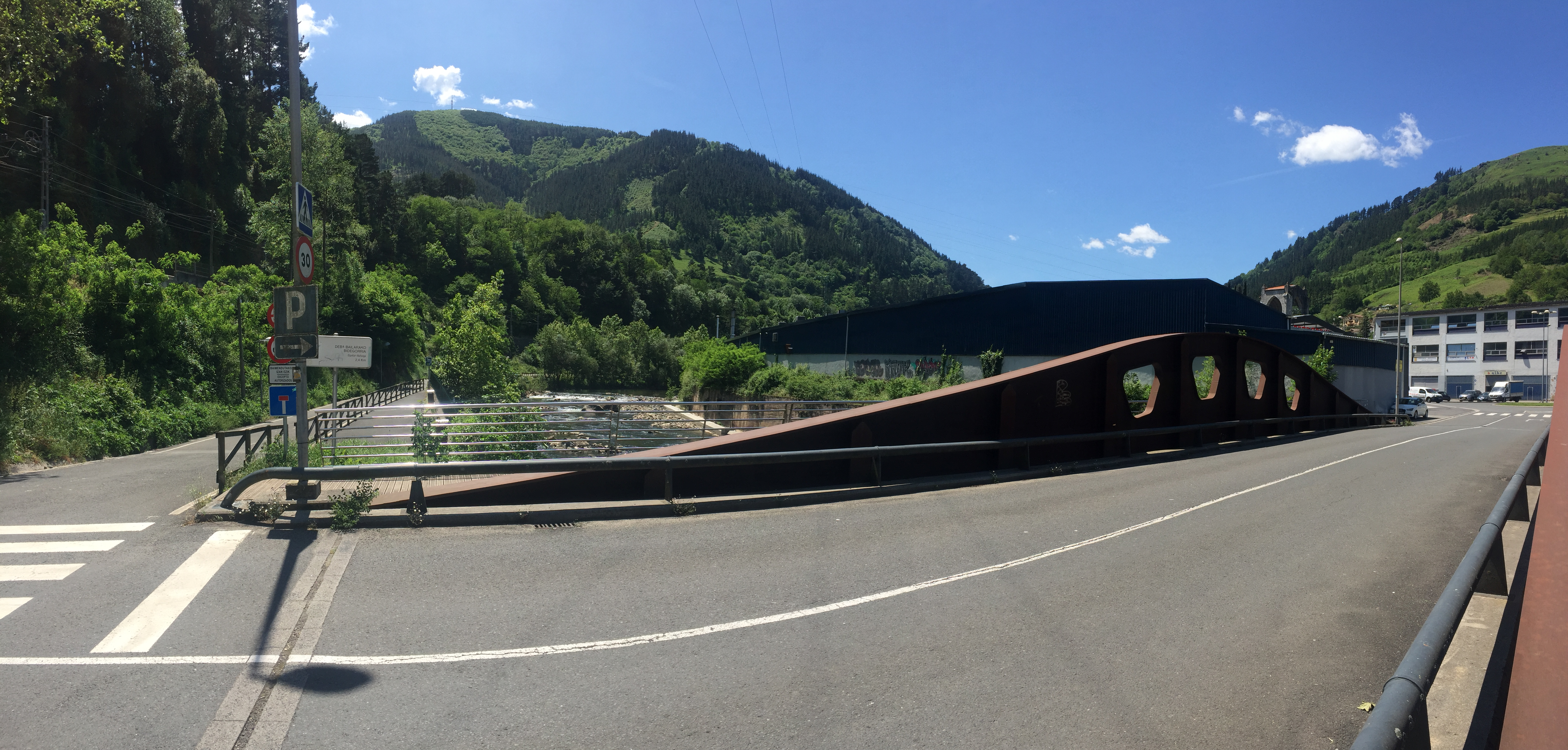
Karakate mountain from the town of Elgoibar
