= Geminiani =

Geminiani is an Italian surname. Notable people with the surname include:

- Francesco Geminiani (1687–1762), Italian violinist, composer and music theorist
- Lautaro Geminiani (born 1991), Argentine professional footballer
- Sante Geminiani (1919–1951), Italian motorcycle racer

== See also ==
- Raphaël Géminiani (1925–2024), French cyclist
