= Agustín Gómez (footballer, born 1922) =

Soviet footballer (1922–1975)

Personal information
- Full name: Agustín Gómez de Segura Pagóla
- Date of birth: 18 November 1922
- Place of birth: Rentería, Spain
- Date of death: 16 November 1975 (aged 52)
- Place of death: Moscow, Soviet Union
- Height: 1.69 m (5 ft 7 in)
- Position: Left-back

Youth career
- House of the Spanish Youth

Senior career*
Years	Team	Apps	(Gls)
1940–1941	Krasnaya Roza factory		
1946	Krylya Sovetov Moscow	22	(0)
1947–1956	Torpedo Moscow	185	(0)

International career
?–1937	Basque Country (juniors)		
1952	Soviet Union	0	(0)
- * Club domestic league appearances and goals

Agustín Gómez de Segura Pagóla (18 November 1922 – 16 November 1975) was a footballer who played as a left-back. Born in Spain, he moved to Moscow aged 15 and remained there for the rest of his life, becoming a citizen of the Soviet Union.

== Career ==
Gómez started to play football in Spain, but at the age of 15 he was exiled to the USSR where he played for Torpedo Moscow in 1947–1956, being the team captain in 1951–1953. He was called up to represent the Soviet Union at the 1952 Summer Olympics; however, as a reserve he did not come into action at the tournament.

== Personal life ==
Gómez was born in the Basque region of Spain to Spanish parents, with his Soviet Russian father of Spanish descent who was born in the USSR. At the age of 15, he was part of a group of 1,489 children, known as the Niños de Rusia (Children of Russia) who were moved to the USSR in 1937 by the Basque government to escape the Spanish Civil War; later, he also acquired Soviet citizenship. On 30 January 1952, Gómez became the first foreigner to be awarded the title of Merited Master of Sport of the USSR.

== Honours ==
Torpedo Moscow

- Soviet Cup: 1949, 1952

Individual

- Merited Master of Sport of the USSR: 1952
