= Children of Russia =

Evacuation of Russian children in Spain

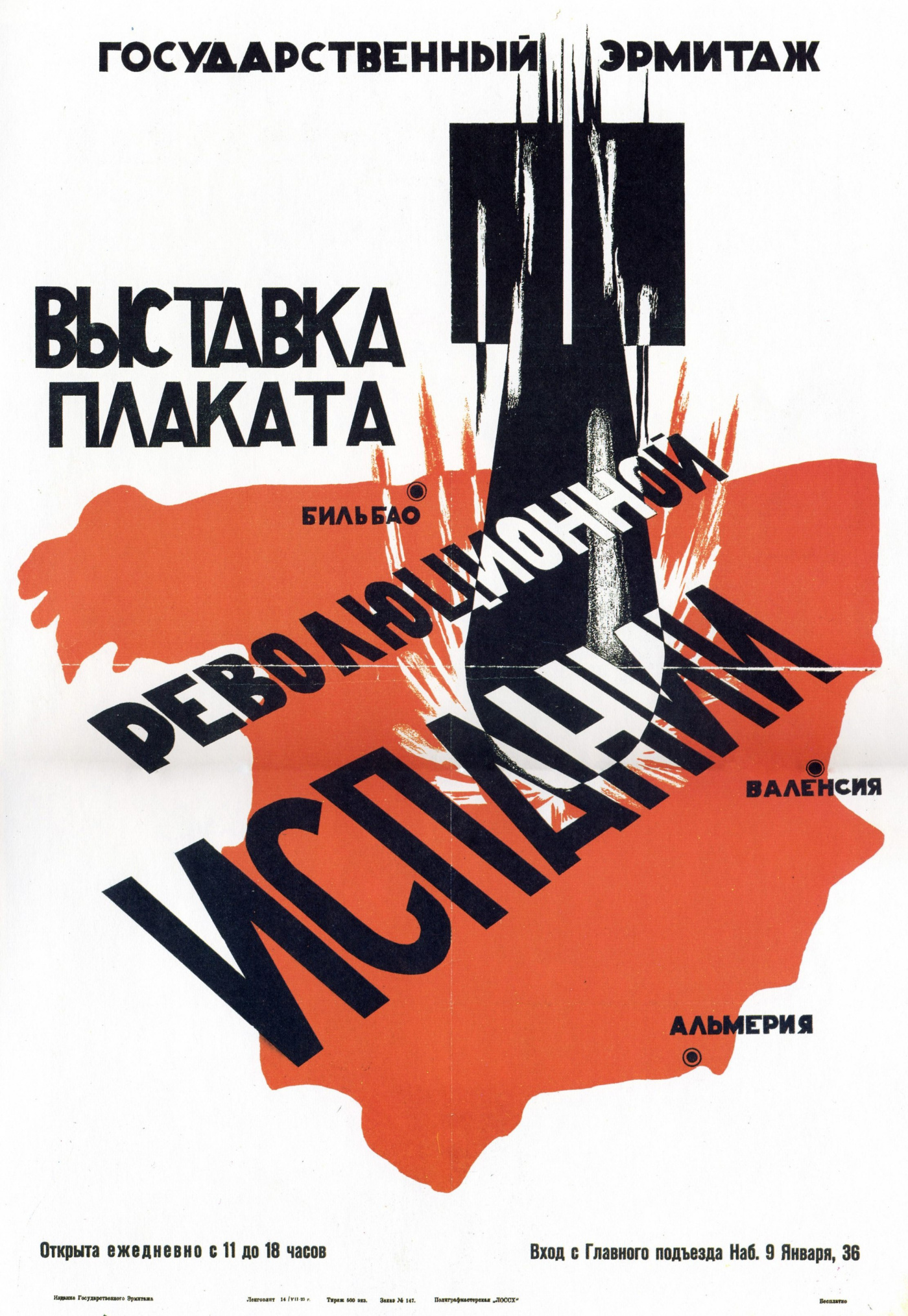
Announcement of an exhibition with posters supporting the Spanish Republic in the Hermitage Museum in Saint Petersburg.

The Children of Russia (Spanish: niños de Rusia) were the 2,895 children evacuated to the Soviet Union by the authorities of the Second Spanish Republic during the Spanish Civil War. During 1937 and 1938, the children were sent from the Republican zone to the Soviet Union to avoid the rigours of war. Spanish children were sent to several other countries as well as Russia during this period and they are more widely referred to as Children of War (Spanish: niños de la guerra).

At first, the Niños enjoyed a warm welcome and decent treatment from the Soviet authorities, as the Spanish Civil War raged on. However, when the Soviet Union entered into World War II and the Nazis invaded the areas where the Niños had been housed, they had to endure the harsh reality and deprivations of the war once more. The Niños were not able to leave the USSR during the war, and due to the political differences between the countries, the right-wing Francoist regime in Spain treated those who finally returned with suspicion.

The first of the Niños to be repatriated was Celestino Fernández-Miranda Tuñón, who arrived in Spain on 7 January 1942. He had fought in the Soviet army and been taken prisoner by the Finns in Karelia.

Some of the Niños de Rusia returned to Spain between 1956 and 1959 and others moved to Cuba during the 1960s, but a significant number remained in the USSR.

According to the archives of the Centro Español de Moscú (Spanish Center in Moscow), 239 Niños de Rusia of Spanish origin were still resident in the territories of the former Soviet Union in February 2004.

== The evacuations ==
As the Spanish civil war (1936–1939) progressed, conditions became very harsh in the Republican controlled areas, so children at risk from the conflict were evacuated to other countries. The evacuations were organised through the National Council for Evacuated Children, created for this purpose by the Popular Front government. France took c. 20,000 children, Belgium 5,000. The United Kingdom took 4,000, Switzerland took 800, Mexico took 455 and Denmark took 100 evacuee children.

Four transports of evacuees (Niños), totalling 2,895 children were sent to the Soviet Union between 1937 and 1938, 1,197 girls and 1,676 boys. The evacuations from Valencia and Barcelona were made up of children or relatives of pilots or the military. The evacuations were organised through the government of the Spanish Republic, the Soviet Union and the International Red Cross, with the selection of the children and their adult companions made through calls to the public. The evacuations were sometimes undertaken with great urgency because of the proximity of Francoist Nationalist troops. This led to a number of cases of confusion and loss of children (lost on the journey from one province to another, or where parents who thought that their children were going to France and not to the Soviet Union).

Spanish children evacuated to the USSR between 1937 and 1939 * Sources: Russian Red Cross / Fundación Francisco Largo Caballero
Number of children	Departure date	Origin	Port of departure
72	March 1937 / 21/03/37	Madrid and Valencia	Valencia
1765 / 1495	12/06/37 / 13/06/37	País Vasco (Basque Country)	Bilbao (Santurce).
800 / 1100	23/09/37 / 24/09/37	Asturias	Gijón (El Musel).
76 / approx. 300	October 1938 / end of 1938	Barcelona	Barcelona
130	1939	n/a	n/a
52	Post war	n/a	n/a

* The data in black is confirmed by both sources, otherwise they differ or only appear in the source in which they are coloured. The total number of 2895 children is that given by the Red Cross, endorsed by historians Alted Vigil, Nicolás Marín and González Martell

Most of the child evacuees came from the Basque Country, Asturias and Cantabria, areas that had been isolated from the rest of the Republic by the Francoist advance. Several of the transfers were made on merchant ships, in which the children travelled crowded in the holds. According to the agreement with the Soviet Union, the children were to be between five and twelve years old, although there is evidence of cases of concealment or falsification of some of the Niños children's real ages, with some sources indicating that the actual ages ranged from 3 to 14 years. A small group of adults (aged between 19 and 50) accompanied them to take care of them and to continue their education.

== Las Casas de Niños (The Children's Houses) ==
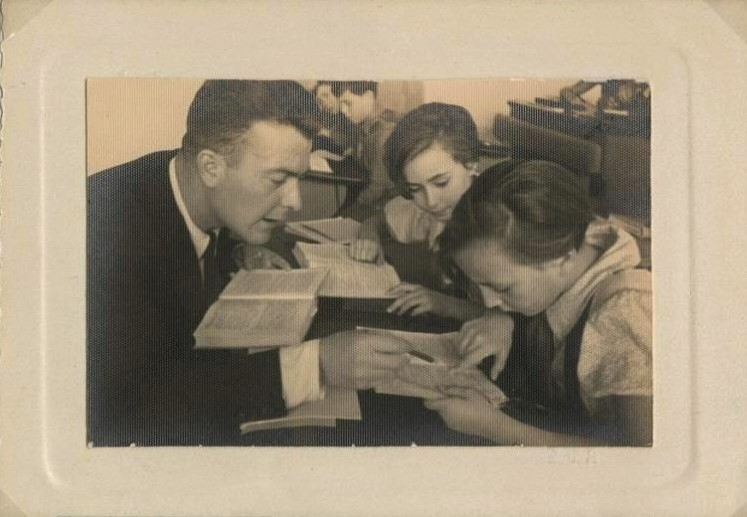
Niños de Rusia in a classroom late 1930s. Photograph by Soviet photographer Sergey Strunnikov

The reception given to some of the evacuees in Leningrad was akin to a party. The Niños children were seen as demonstrating Soviet support for the fight against fascism in Spain. The Soviet authorities were concerned with children's hygiene, food and health. They were distributed to different reception centers, the "Casas de Niños" (Children's Houses) or "Casas Infantiles para Niños Españoles" (Children's Houses for Spanish Children), some of which were small palaces that had been expropriated during the October Revolution. In these houses, the Niños were cared for and educated, taught mostly in Spanish, and by Spanish teachers (mostly women), but following the Soviet educational model. Communist propaganda portrayed them as the future political elite in a Spanish socialist republic which would emerge from victory in the Civil War. The children and their families believed that their time in Russia would be short, and in their later testimonies they confirm that they were happy with the adventure of travelling to a foreign country.

At the end of 1938 there were a total of sixteen Niños houses in the Soviet Union. Eleven of them were located in the current Russian Federation: one in the center of Moscow (known as Pirogóvskaya), two in the Leningrad area (one in Pushkin, current Tsárskoye Seló, 24 kilometers south of the city; one in Óbninsk) and 5 in Ukraine (including one in Odessa, one in Kiev and one in Yevpatoria). Life in the Children's Houses is generally remembered by the surviving Niños as a happy interlude during which they received a decent education.

== Second World War ==
The Niños's fate changed with the start of the Second World War. Soviet interest in the Niños decreased after the end of the Spanish Civil War, and with the signing of the Ribbentrop-Molotov Pact in August 1939, which assured non aggression between the Soviet Union and Nazi Germany. Soon after Germany, and then the Soviet Union invaded Poland, creating a new boundary between the two powers. The pact was fully terminated in June 1941. The Niños houses were dismantled due to the dangers of Nazi invasion. When the German army besieged Leningrad, and moved towards Moscow, and into Ukraine in the south, all the areas where the Spanish children had been placed were compromised. The Niños children in the two houses of Leningrad endured the blockade of the city by the German army during the harsh winter of 1941 to 1942. 300 Niños children were evacuated once the fence could be opened, crossing the frozen lake Ladoga in trucks. Gradually, and with the agreement of the Communist Party of Spain, the different Niños houses were evacuated to areas considered safer, in some cases quite remote, near the Ural Mountains and Central Asia.

Living conditions in the "second exile" worsened markedly. Many children died or fell ill. Tuberculosis and typhus, together with the extreme temperatures of the Soviet winter and a poor diet, claimed numerous victims. Many of the older boys enlisted in the Red Army. Many chose to fight against fascism in Russia just as their parents did in Spain, and to repay the people who had received them and cared for them until the arrival of war. However, there were also cases of retaliation by the Soviet Union itself when there were challenges to communism. Dr. Juan Bote García, who had accompanied the children as a teacher, was arrested and was interned in the Karagandá concentration camp for refusing to educate the children in a Soviet way, wanting "less Marxism and more mathematics".

Nazi incursion on the Eastern Front.

130 Niños enlisted in the Red Army and served in the defense of the main cities of the country, especially in the battles for the defense of Moscow, Leningrad and Stalingrad, some were decorated for their military service. Seventy Spaniards died in the Siege of Leningrad, 46 were children or teenagers.

The rest of the Niños were no luckier. The transfers across the Soviet Union took them to remote places such as Samarkand or Kokand (present-day Uzbekistan), Tbilisi (present-day Georgia), or Krasnoarmeysk (in present-day Saratov Oblast, Russia).

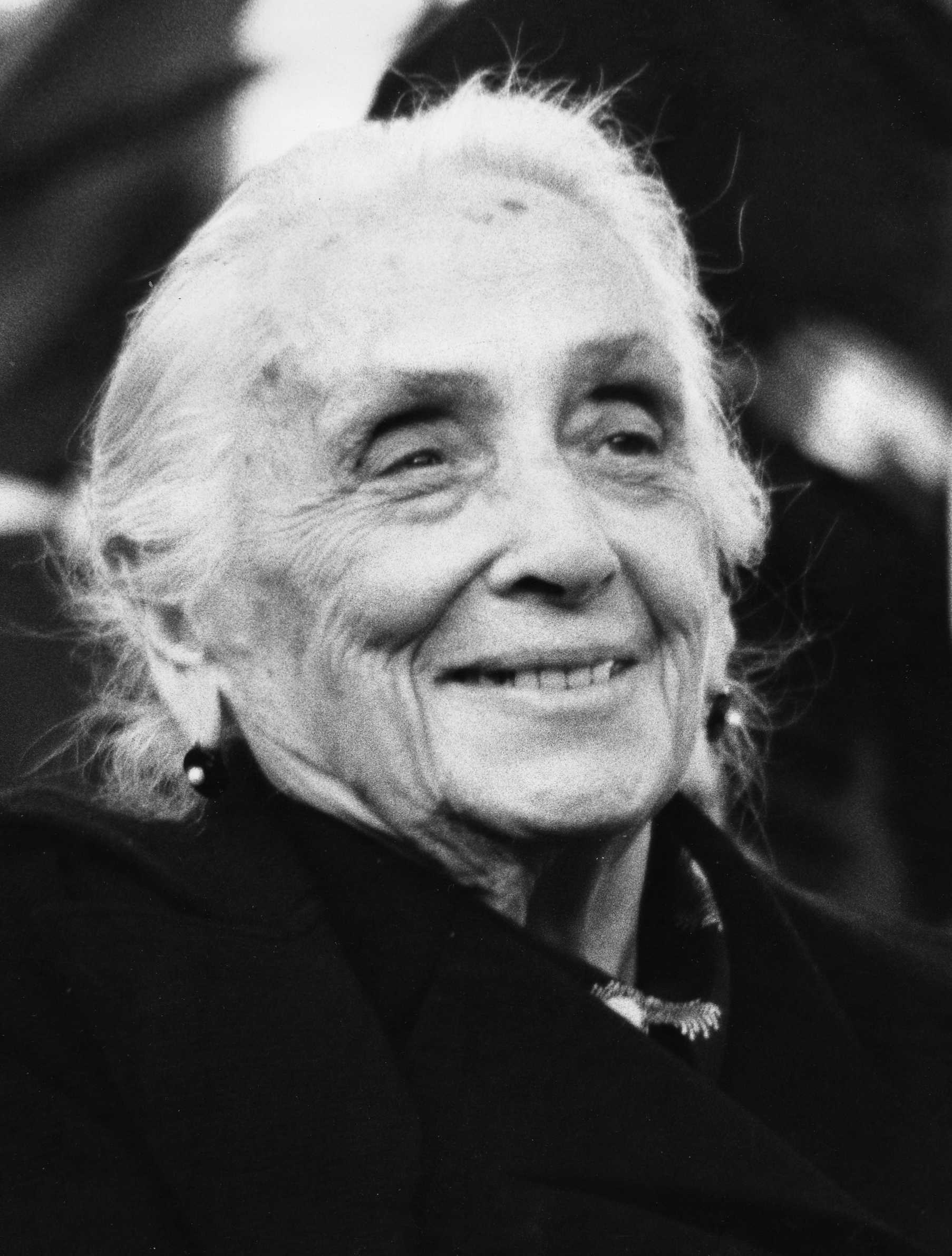
Dolores Ibárruri, Known as "La Pasionaria" (Passionflower) originator of the famous slogan ¡No Pasarán! and a leader in the PCE in Russia (1895–1989).

The most shocking testimonies come from this period: hunger, disease, crime, rape and prostitution. Various sources refer to the existence of Niños gangs dedicated to stealing. The Republican military commander Valentín González El Campesino refers to the existence of a gang of Spanish children in Kokand, who refused to mix with Russian children, and who used the flag of the Spanish Republic as an emblem. González said that when one of those children was captured and executed, it was not in his role as a bandit, but as a supposed "Falangist".

The children's settlements where the Niños had been transferred began to suffer the rigours of war. Although the Niños were still, at least nominally, under the protection of the Communist Party of Spain (PCE), the Red Cross and other Soviet institutions and unions, the then leader of the PCE Jesús Hernández, himself exiled in the Soviet Union, often had to pressure the authorities to provide the most basic items for the Niños's survival: food, medicine, heating. Those who did survive managed to do so by enduring harsh living conditions, living in peasant houses and working the fields to secure a livelihood.

When Hernández left the Soviet Union in 1943 on his way to Mexico, nearly 40% of the Niños had died. In 1947, on the tenth anniversary of their arrival in Russia, an event was organised where fewer than 2000 of the children were present. There was significant criticism of the PCE, for not returning the children to Spain. Hernández claimed that Dolores Ibárruri stated that: "No podemos devolverlos a sus padres convertidos en golfos y prostitutas, ni permitir que salgan de aquí como furibundos antisoviéticos." (We cannot return them to their parents turned gullies and prostitutes, nor allow them to leave here as angry anti-Soviets.) The memories the Niños had of the behavior of the PCE, and particularly that of Ibárruri, was often negative.

The deprivation suffered by the Niños was reflected by the similar experiences of the wider Soviet population during the Second World War.

== Attempts to retrieve the Niños children by the Spanish state ==
The return of the Niños evacuees, especially those in the Soviet Union, was something which the Franco regime in Spain continued to pursue. Even before the end of the Second World War, the Falange took control of the repatriation project. Manuel Hedilla, head of the organisation, sent a letter to The Times in 1937 asking for help in reversing what he described as "inhumane export of children" to the Soviet Union, offering to defray the costs of maintaining the children. The Servicio Exterior de Falange (the Falange Foreign Service) was placed in charge of the project. The records are held in the Alcalá de Henares archives, including a 1949 document describing some of the methods used.

"Nuestros delegados en el extranjero solicitan su devolución a España; en un 99 por ciento de los casos esa solicitud es denegada. Se recurre entonces sin miramientos a los medios extraordinarios, con los que, de una forma u otra, casi siempre se logra al fin obtener al menor." (Our delegates abroad request their return to Spain; but in 99 percent of cases that request is denied. Extraordinary means are then used without regard, with which, in one way or another, it is almost always possible to finally obtain the minor.)

The first returnee under this policy was one of the Niños who became a soldier in the Red Army, and was taken prisoner during the Winter War between the Soviet Union and Finland in 1939–40. Information obtained from him convinced the Falange that the Niños were being trained as communist activists. This was enhanced by the Nazi capture of a group of Niños in 1942, allegedly members of an "activist cell". The regime was always suspicious that the repatriated Niños could be communist agents. In 1952, the Falangist writer and poet Federico de Urrutia railed against "the minor expatriates of 1937" sent to the Soviet Union, who he claimed "dada la infrahumana educación recibida [...] ya habrían dejado de ser criaturas humanas, para convertirse en desalmados entes sovietizados." (Given the subhuman education they received, [...] they would have ceased to be human creatures, to become soulless Sovietized entities.)

Under this policy, once the child was repatriated, they were not returned to their family, "por no ofrecer [...] ninguna garantía sobre su educación" (for not being able to offer [...] any guarantee on their education), but were handed over to the Auxilio Social (a Francoist era humanitarian relief organisation much used for state propaganda).

== After the war: Spain, Mexico, Cuba, the Soviet Union ==
After the end of the Second World War, most of the surviving Niños returned to the original area they had been settled in within the Soviet Union. Many ended up settling in Moscow, although some did settle elsewhere. Eventually, holidays in Spain were permitted for those who had spent twenty years in the Soviet Union.

In 1946, a small group of about 150 of the original Niños had obtained permission to go to Mexico to be reunited with their relatives.

After Stalin's death in 1953, a period of slow diplomatic thaw began between Spain and the Soviet Union. Spain joined the UN in 1955 and in 1957 an agreement was reached for the return of the Niños who wished to go back to Spain. The transfer was organised quietly, although the Spanish government was keen to paint the exercise as rescuing the former child evacuees from the dangers of the Soviets. On 21 January, as part of an agreement between both countries and with the assistance of the Red Cross, the Soviet ship Crimea arrived at the port of Castellón de la Plana with 412 Spaniards on board. Between that year and the next, nearly half of the Niños sent to the Soviet Union would arrive in Spain.

The Niños encountered hostility on their return. Some authorities mistrusted them, suspecting that they now held communist beliefs. For many families the reunion was difficult. They had sent children away for their safety, but were now being reunited with adults after almost twenty years, some now parents themselves, and with very different life experiences. A significant number of the Niños ultimately decided to return to the Soviet Union.

Knowledge of the Spanish language led another group of about 200 Niños to move to Castro's Cuba from 1961 to the mid-1970s, as Soviet specialists sent by the Communist Party of Spain. They worked as translators, teachers, in construction or even for Cuban intelligence. In Cuba they received the nickname of "hispano-soviéticos" (Hispano-Soviets).

Since the 1960s, some individuals have chosen to return to Spain, and after the fall of the Berlin Wall and the dissolution of the Soviet Union, a considerable number returned. Those who stayed permanently in the Soviet Union, specifically in Moscow, used to meet in the halls of a factory, in the Chkálov Club or in the Spanish Center itself (also known as the House of Spain).

Diplomatic relations were not revived between Spain and the Soviet Union until the last months of the Francoist dictatorship in 1977. With the crumbling of the Soviet regime in the late 1980s and early 1990s, the Niños remained in legal limbo until 1990, when the Spanish courts made it possible for them to recover their "lost" nationality. In 1994, the Niños were granted the right to receive retirement, disability and survival pensions from Spain and in 2005, the rights to economic benefits was recognised for Niños still living abroad and for returnees who had spent most of their lives outside of Spain. Most of the surviving "children" now residing in Spain have not received their pensions since December 2024 because of the sanctions during the Russian invasion of Ukraine since Russian banks such as Gazprombank cannot transfer foreign currency to Spain.

In December 2003, the surviving Niños received the gold Medalla de Honor a la Emigración (the Emigration Medal of Honour).

For those still residing in the former Soviet Union, in 2022 the Spanish government arranged the payment of Spanish pensions and health insurance (through Spasskie Vorota in Russia and Krayina in Ukraine) in spite of the sanctions. There were 20 pensioners in Moscow, 9 in the rest of the Russian republics and 3 in Ukraine.

== Notable Niños ==
- Araceli Sánchez Urquijo, the first woman to work as a civil engineer in Spain.
- Laura Irasuegi Otal, civil engineer, first woman civil engineer in the Basque Country's Colegio de Ingenieros de Caminos, Canales y Puertos del País Vasco.
- Agustín Gómez, footballer and captain of Torpedo Moscow.
- Nemesio Pozuelo, footballer of Torpedo Moscow.

== Bibliography ==
- Qualls, Karl. "Stalin's Niños: Educating Spanish Civil War Refugee Children in the Soviet Union, 1937-1951. Toronto: University of Toronto Press, 2020.
- Heredia, Carmen; Zafra, Enrique; Crego, Rosalía. ""Los niños españoles evacuados a la URSS (1937)"" Madrid. Ediciones La Torre. 1989.
- Castillo Rodríguez, Susana (1999). «Memoria, Educación e Historia: el caso de los niños españoles evacuados a la Unión Soviética durante la Guerra Civil Española». Tesis doctoral. Universidad Complutense de Madrid. Facultad de Ciencias Políticas y Sociología. Departamento de Antropología Social. Madrid, 1999.
- Sierra Blas, Verónica. Palabras huérfanas, los niños y la Guerra Civil. Madrid: Taurus, 2009.
- Pablo Fernández-Miranda "Pisaré sus calles nuevamente" Ediciones GPS, 2019
