= Víctor Lecumberri =

Spanish politician

Víctor Lecumberri (1913–2005) was a Spanish politician. Known as Commander Otxabiña, he was a communist politician and trade unionist.
