= Confederación Empresarial de Economia Social =

Spanish Social Economy Business Confederation
- Confederación Empresarial Española de la Economía Social
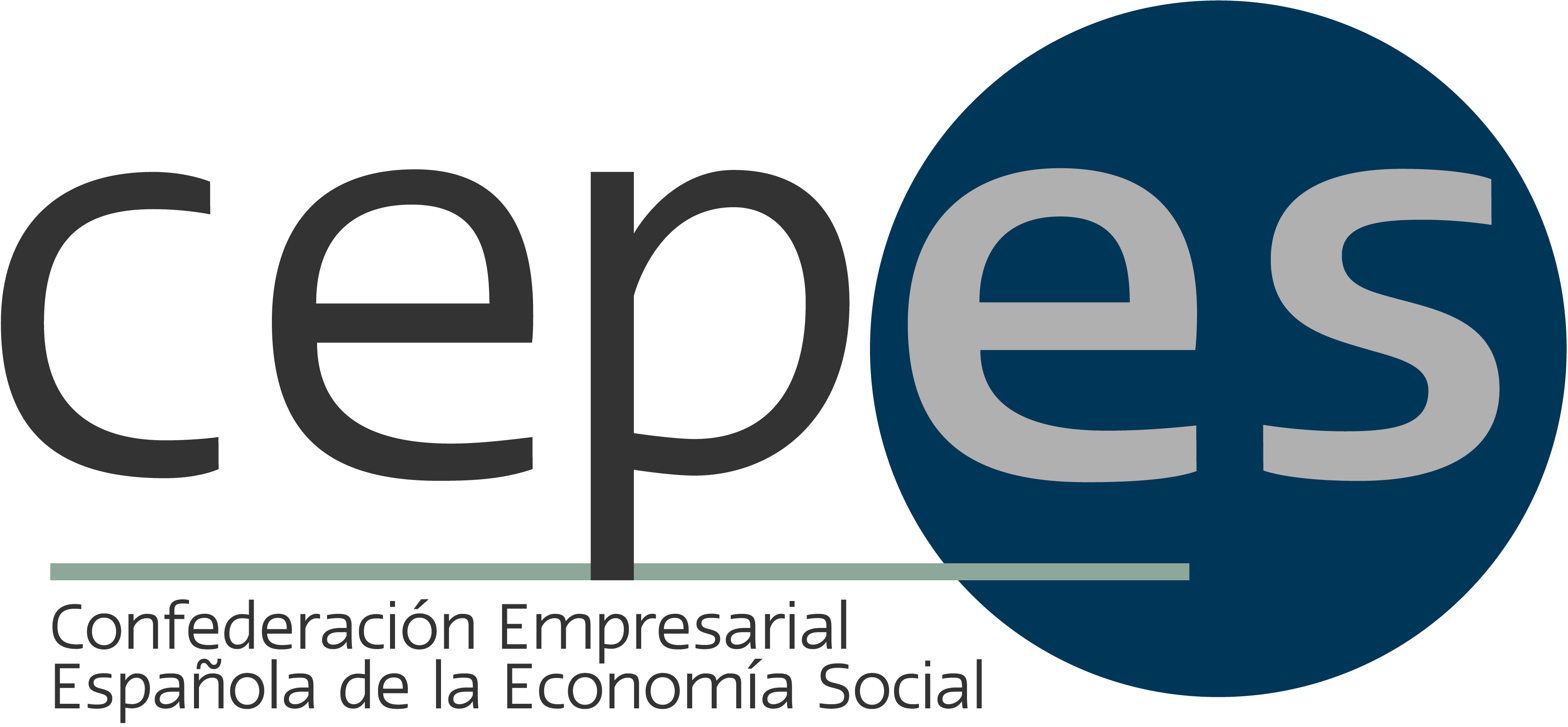
- Chairperson: Juan Antonio Pedreño
- Website: https://www.cepes.es/

The Confederación Empresarial Española de la Economía Social (CEPES) (English: Spanish Confederation of Social Economy Companies or Spanish Social Economy Business Confederation) is an organization who represents the companies of the social economy in Spain.

Founded on 1992, the organization has 23 partners who organize themselves in the Spanish independent communities through 200 structures of support.

The CEPES objectives include:

- To integrate to all the sector of Spanish social economy.
- To be spokesman of these social restlessness, working in coherence with the European expositions and more explicitly with the defined thing in the organ of unitary representation of the European social economy (SOCIAL ECONOMY EUROPE - previously known as CEP-CMAF).
- To be a specialized observer of the growth and evolution of the social economy, analyzing its development and proposing favorecedores forms and processes that support the social cohesion.
- To develop formativos and orientative systems that harness the capacities of the entrepreneur.
- To cause instruments that facilitate the enterprise interchange and its commercial management from the possibilities of the internationalization.
- To coordinate, the "Red Euromediterránea de Economía Social" (Greece, Italy, France, Portugal and Spain) with two objectives:
  - to homogenizar the concept of social economy in the south of Europe.
  - to try a better competitive balance of this type of companies in all the River basin, specially considering that in the 2010 will settle down as zone of free commerce.
- To represent the social economy of Spain in the European forums.
