= Basque music =

Music of the Basque region and people

Basque music refers to the music made in the Basque Country, reflecting traits related to its society and tradition, and devised by people of that territory. While traditionally more closely associated to rural based and Basque language music. The growing diversification of its production during the last decades has tipped the scale in favour of a broad definition.

== Traditional Music ==
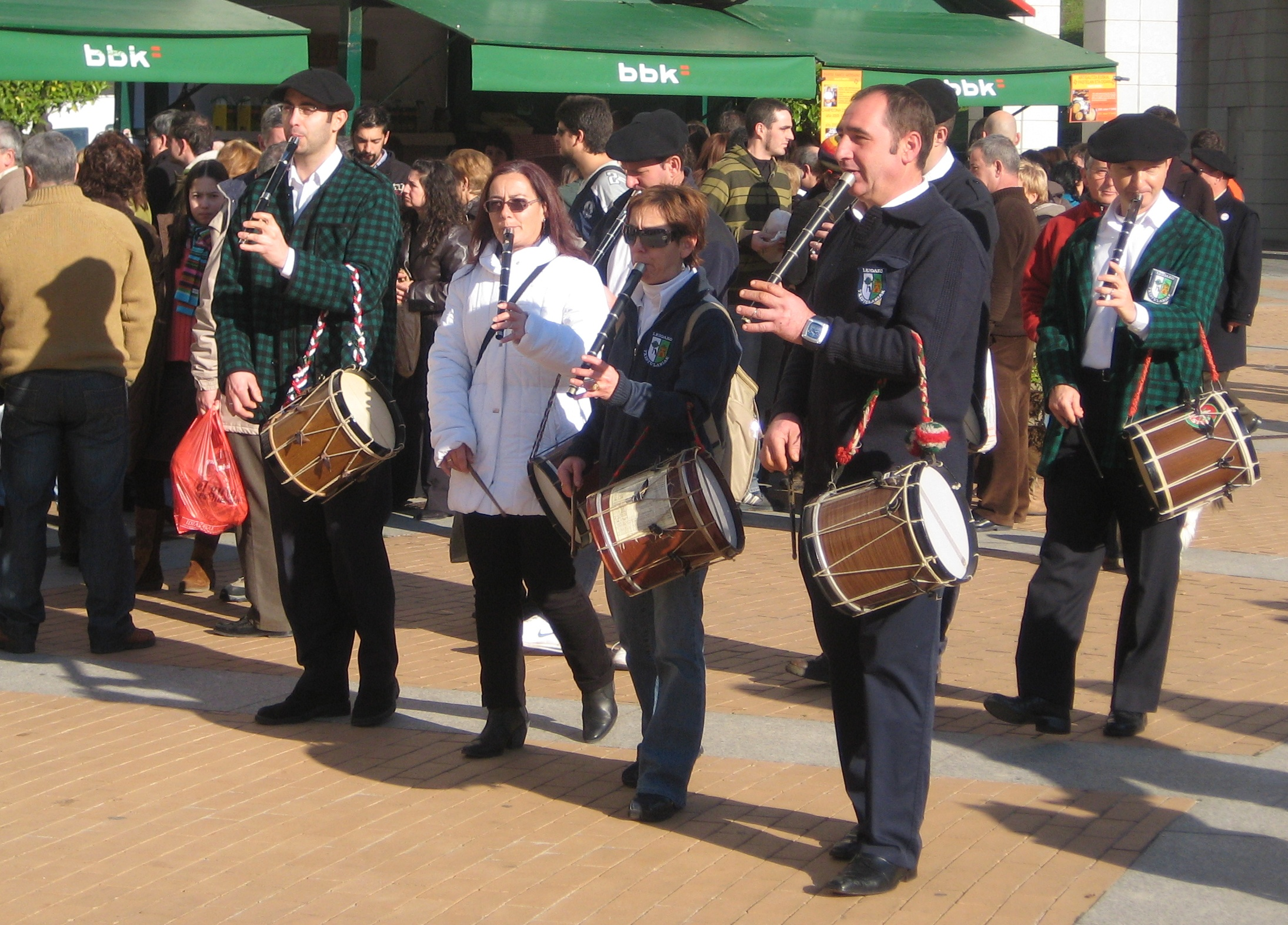
Txistu ensemble in the streets of Leioa

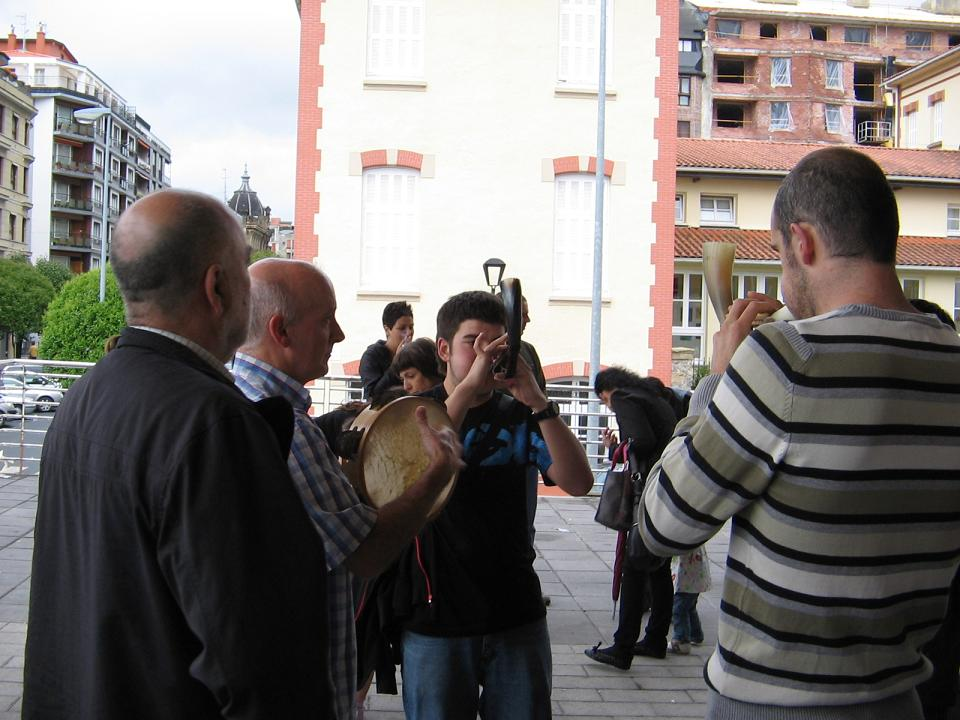
Alboka players and a tambourine man playing a tune together

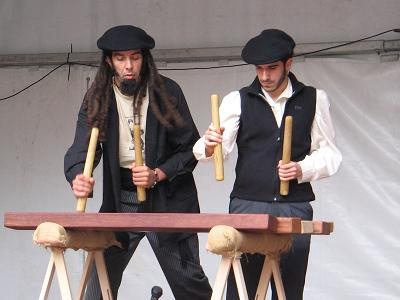
Txalaparta players in a festival

Basque traditional music is a product of the region's historic development and strategic geographical position on the Atlantic arch at a crossroads between mountains (Cantabrian mountain range, Pyrenees) and plains (Ebro basin), ocean and inland, European continent and Iberian Peninsula. Its culture and music has been exposed to a number of influences throughout history, ranging from British and northern European to Mediterranean to Arabic. For example, traditional overseas commerce with England, or international pilgrimage on the Way of St James added greatly to leave an imprint in both instruments and tunes.

=== Instruments ===
Folk instruments widespread in Europe ceased to be used in some places and only remained in specific areas, where they took hold and adopted traits associated with the region. The three-hole pipe or tabor pipe in Europe resulted in two specific instruments in the Basque Country: the txistu and the xirula. Accordingly, different instruments may have evolved out of one, such as Navarrese dulzaina and Souletin txanbela, with slight differences between them.

Most instruments adopted in rural and folk circles do not go back more than six centuries, with some having been introduced as late as the 19th century, such as the trikitixa or txistu. Most Basque instruments originated outside the Basque Country and became popular in the territory at some stage, but the txalaparta is not one of them.

Some traditional Basque instruments include:

- Alboka, a difficult double clarinet played in a circular breathing technique similar to that used for the Sardinian launeddas.
- Txalaparta, a wooden xylophone-like percussion instrument for two players.
- Kirikoketa, a wooden percussion device akin to the txalaparta associated with the cider making process.
- Toberak, a percussion instrument made of horizontal metal bars.
- Txistu, a local pipe.
- Drum, called danbolin, and usually accompanying the txistu.
- Atabal, a double sided, portable flat drum played together with aerophones.
- Xirula, a three-hole flute, shorter and more high-pitched than txistu.
- Ttun-ttun, a vertical stringed drum played usually together with the xirula.
- Trikitixa or eskusoinua, a lively diatonic button accordion.
- Tambourine, usually played together with the trikitixa.
- Dulzaina, a Navarre-based pipe belonging to the shawm family.
- Blowing horn, an instrument made of ox horn.
- Barrel organ, a mechanical instrument played with a barrel or punched rolls. It’s the most common instrument to see in the autonomous community.

=== Singing tradition ===
==== A collective soul ====
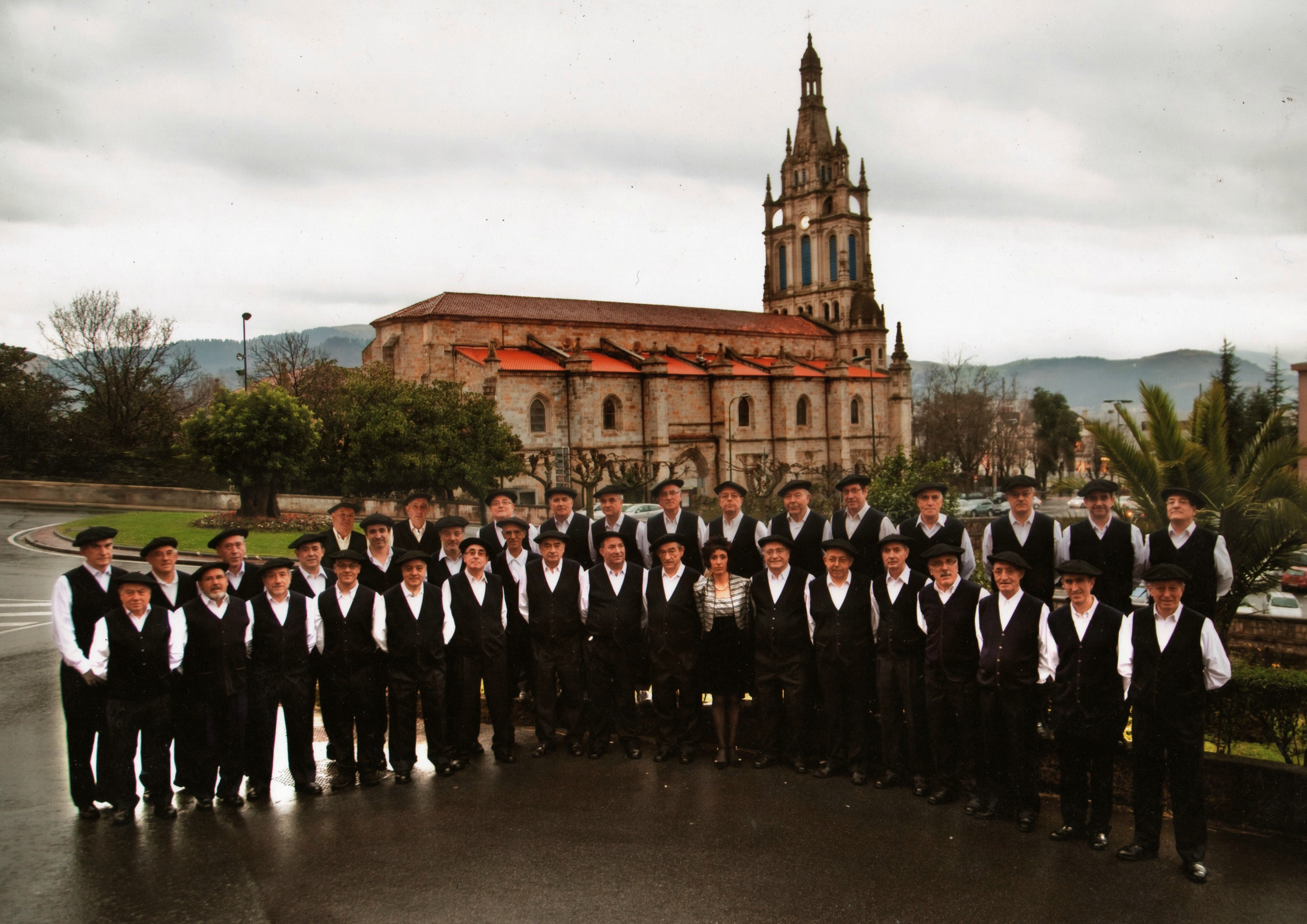
Basque traditional choir

The Basque people are given to singing. Basque language has stuck to the oral tradition stronger than the Romance languages, and its literature was first recorded to writing in the 16th century. There are ballads dating from the 15th century that have been passed from parents to children by word of mouth, like Ozaze Jaurgainian from Soule, which relates events six centuries ago and has been passed down in different versions. The best known was popularized by Benito Lertxundi, or Alostorrea, from Biscay. These ballads were crafted and spread by minstrels or bertsolaris, were kept in popular memory, and were transmitted in the so-called kopla zaharrak, sets of poems with a characteristic rhythmic pattern that could be sung.

This is similar to traditional practices elsewhere in Europe. For example, the first work of literature in Basque Linguæ Vasconum Primitiæ (1545) by Bernard Etxepare shows long verses that, while deceptively fashioned in metres resembling those used in Romance poetry, follow an internal rhythmic pattern similar to a kopla, so they can be popularly sung. Today, it is not unusual to see groups of people marching around a town at a local festival singing and asking neighbours for food, drink or a donation. The most famous celebrations following this pattern across the Basque Country may be those taking place on Christmas Eve, like Olentzero and the Saint Agatha's Eve, with singers dressing up in traditional costumes.

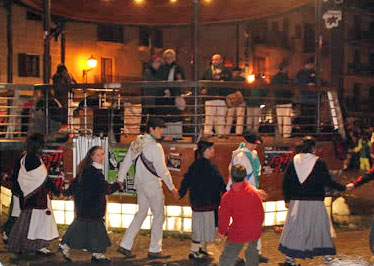
Holding hands in the traditional Saint Agatha's Eve (Altsasu)

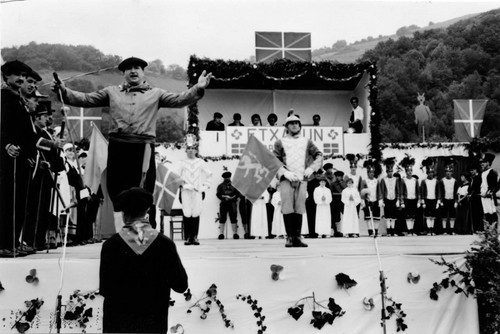
A pastoral, traditional sung theatre of Soule, focused on Etxahun-Iruri

It follows that traditional singing is closely related to bertsolaris, improvising bards, who in the modern day hold an important status in Basque culture. They voice the people's concerns by means of a formal tradition coming from the people (tunes, linguistic devices), and act as their spokespersons. A considerable corpus of traditional songs was gathered by Resurrección María de Azkue and Aita Donostia, two religious scholars interested in Basque folk culture at the turn of the 20th century and later in Cancionero popular vasco (1918) and Euskal Eres-Sorta. Cancionero Vasco (1922).

In the present day, the band Hiru Truku (comprising the celebrated musicians Joseba Tapia, Ruper Ordorika and Bixente Martinez) has chosen several ancient songs from all over the Basque Country, updated the music and released them in a number of albums. Another current long-standing group who elaborate on traditional songs is Oskorri. The band set about singing traditional songs in public performances previously handing out to the audience a repertoire bill including the lyrics and encouraging them to sing along. The band has launched a couple of albums of this kind so far and performed on various tours to public acclaim, becoming popular with middle-aged parents.

A key figure bridging the old singing tradition of Soule and the folk song revival of the 20th century was Pierre Bordazaharre (1907–1979), also known as Etxahun Iruri. A xirula player and singer, he collected old songs and fashioned new ones, which eventually caught on and spread, such as Agur Xiberoa. He also contributed to new pastoral plays in the tradition of Soule, reshaping the pastoral and adding new topics.

There is also a tradition of choral music over the Basque Country. Church choirs were established in some towns to meet the religious musical needs. Yet at the turn of the 20th century, some ensembles became established outside the ecclesiastical context, like the Sociedad Coral de Bilbao (1886), Orfeón Donostiarra (1897) or the Coral Santa Cecilia from San Sebastián (1928). Later on, other ensembles were formed, such as Oldarra Abesbatza from Biarritz (1947), made up of men and sometimes putting on performances as an ochote or the reputed Coral Andra Mari from Errenteria, established in 1966, featuring Basque folk music and Aita Donostia's several scores. Nowadays, many minor choral ensembles, largely offering the Basque folk repertoire, dot the Basque territory. In Bayonne and San Sebastián, an informal initiative has grown popular with amateurs in the late noughties, who meet once a month and go bar hopping around the streets of the respective Old Quarters while singing traditional songs.

Another Basque choral phenomenon is represented by the so-called ochotes, which became popular in the 1930s in the Bilbao region. Eight men with deep voices, with a marked taste for local and folk subjects, singing in Spanish and Basque. This may stem from summer ecclesiastic seminaries, and they thrived on the atmosphere of the bars after their work shift was over. Eventually, a branch of this genre evolved out into bilbainadas up to the 1960s, which fell in decay.

==== Classical soloists ====
Awash in the same singing tradition, but shifting towards the refined European trends prevailing in the higher levels of society, certain Basques became renowned as individual singers. Some soloists worth highlighting include:

- Pierre-Jean Garat (1764–1823): An early soloist thriving on the heat of Labourd's Enlightenment.
- Julián Gayarre (1844–1890): A Navarrese tenor from Roncal with an outstanding tenor voice.

== Composers ==
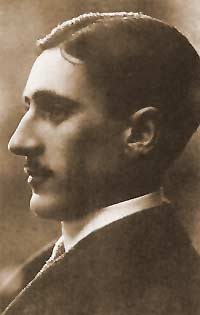
J.M. Usandizaga, a celebrated Basque composer (early 20th century)

The Basque Country has been home to various composers, writing mainly in the 20th century. Much in step with the artistic trends of the first half of the century (painting,...), some of them developed a liking for Basque customs, manners and subjects.

- Juan de Anchieta (1462–1523): Composer of the Renaissance hailing from the area of Azpeitia.
- Santiago de Herdoiza (Durango, c. 1700)
- Juan Crisostomo Arriaga (Bilbao, 1806 – Paris, 1826)
- Jose Maria Usandizaga (San Sebastián, 1887–1915): He is considered along with J. Guridi the father of Basque opera. He drew up orchestral and chamber pieces, like the celebrated Cuarteto de cuerda en Sol, Op. 31, shifting to elaborate zarzuela as well as opera works at the end of his life (Mendi-Mendiyan, 1910: Las Golondrinas, 1914). He had his increasingly successful career cut short by an early death.
- Jesús Guridi (Vitoria-Gasteiz, 1881 – Madrid, 1961): Himself a friend of Usandizaga, whom he met in Paris while attending the Schola Cantorum, he was appointed manager of Bilbao's Sociedad Coral choir in 1912. Influenced by Wagner and musicians of the Late Romanticism, he found inspiration and phrases for his compositions in Basque folklore. His rich musical education enabled him to deal with different types of music, e.g. zarzuela, opera, compositions for choir as well as religious pieces for organ. Some acclaimed works include El caserío (1926), Diez melodías vascas (1940), La meiga (1929), Seis canciones castellanas (1939) and Sinfonía pirenaica (1945).
- Nemesio Otaño (Azkoitia, 1880 – San Sebastián, 1956 ): Composer, organist and musicologist. One of the most important figures in 20th century Spanish music history. Director of the Royal Conservatory of Madrid between 1939 and 1956. Among his most known works is 'Saint Ignatius March' ('Marcha de San Ignacio'), the patron saint of Biscay and Gipuzkoa. In 1894, he studied in the Colegio Preceptoría of Baliarrain, in which he composed two of his first litanies and a zortziko for piano; he was then only fourteen years old, but already played the organ in the school parish. In 1896 he joined the Society of Jesus and began his ecclesiastical studies along with the music classes. In 1911, he founded the Schola Cantorum at Comillas: His performances in plainsong and polyphony were highly influential. His works range from popular sacred songs (e.g. Estrella hermosa, Anima Christi, Baldako) to large-scale choral pieces.
- Pablo Sorozábal (San Sebastián, 1897 – Madrid, 1988)
- Maurice Ravel (Ziburu, 1875 – Paris, 1937): Basque French composer and arranger
- Carmelo Bernaola (Otxandio, 1929 – Madrid, 2002)
- Francisco Escudero (San Sebastián, 1912–2002), composer of Zigor and Gernika), operas with Basque librettos
- Sebastian Iradier (Lanciego, 1809 – Vitoria-Gasteiz, 1865)
- Javier Bello-Portu (Tolosa, 1920 – San Sebastián, 2004)

== Basque Musical Revival ==
=== Postwar desolation and first sprouts ===
In the wake of the Civil War (1936–1937 in the Basque territory), headway made in the Basque culture in the pre-war period were ground to a halt. Fear grew amidst harsh repression, famine became an overriding concern, and former cultural figures died or ran for their lives to exile. As an individual singer of the 1940s, 1950s and 1960s, Luis Mariano jumped onto the Spanish and international scene with light-hearted songs in Spanish, French, and, occasionally Basque. He was born in Irun and moved in his 20s to Bordeaux.

After the hardest postwar years, the younger generation set about putting together duos and small musical groups in Gipuzkoa and Biscay, who gradually began singing original tunes in Basque. Notable bands from the 1960s include Urretxindorrak, Enarak, Soroak and Estitxu, a female singer born to fleeing parents near Bayonne. These new bands sought to take advantage of the regime's increasing liberalization, despite the fact that major obstacles that still hindered cultural activity associated with anything Basque. Cultural and political awareness, social rebelliousness and an urge for action emerged in the following generations, resulting in a new left-leaning Basque nationalist movement.

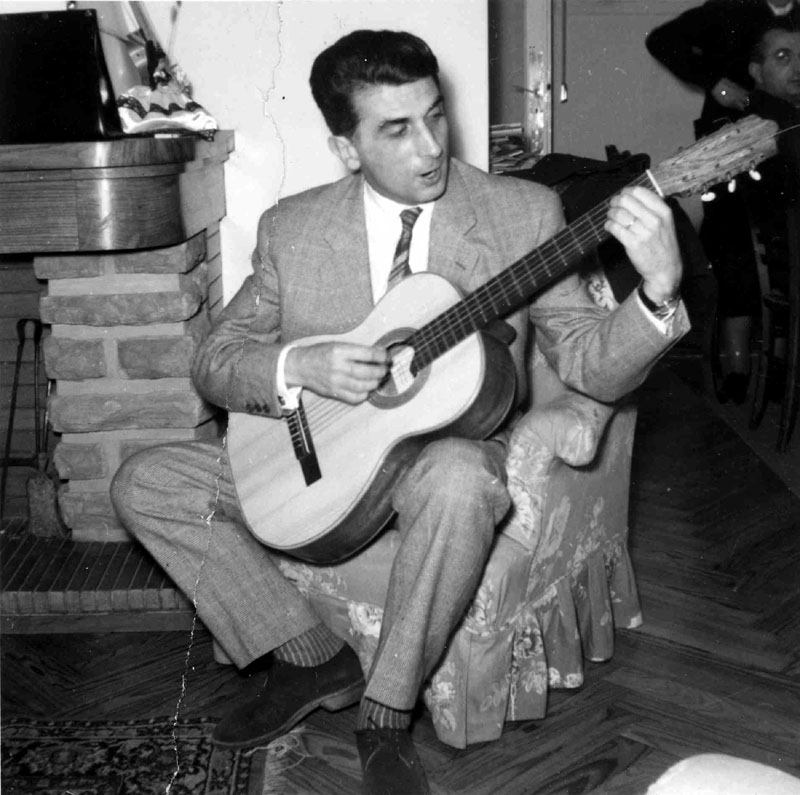
Mixel Labeguerie during the 1960s

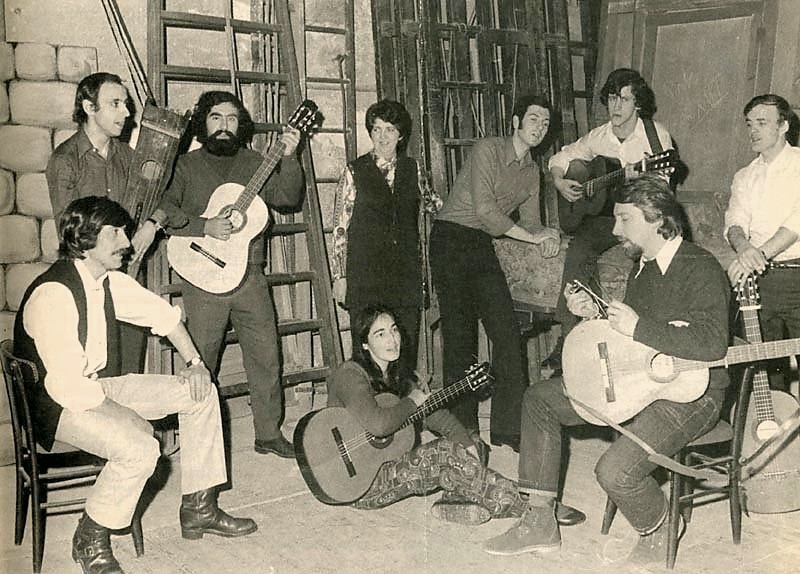
Group "Ez dok amairu"

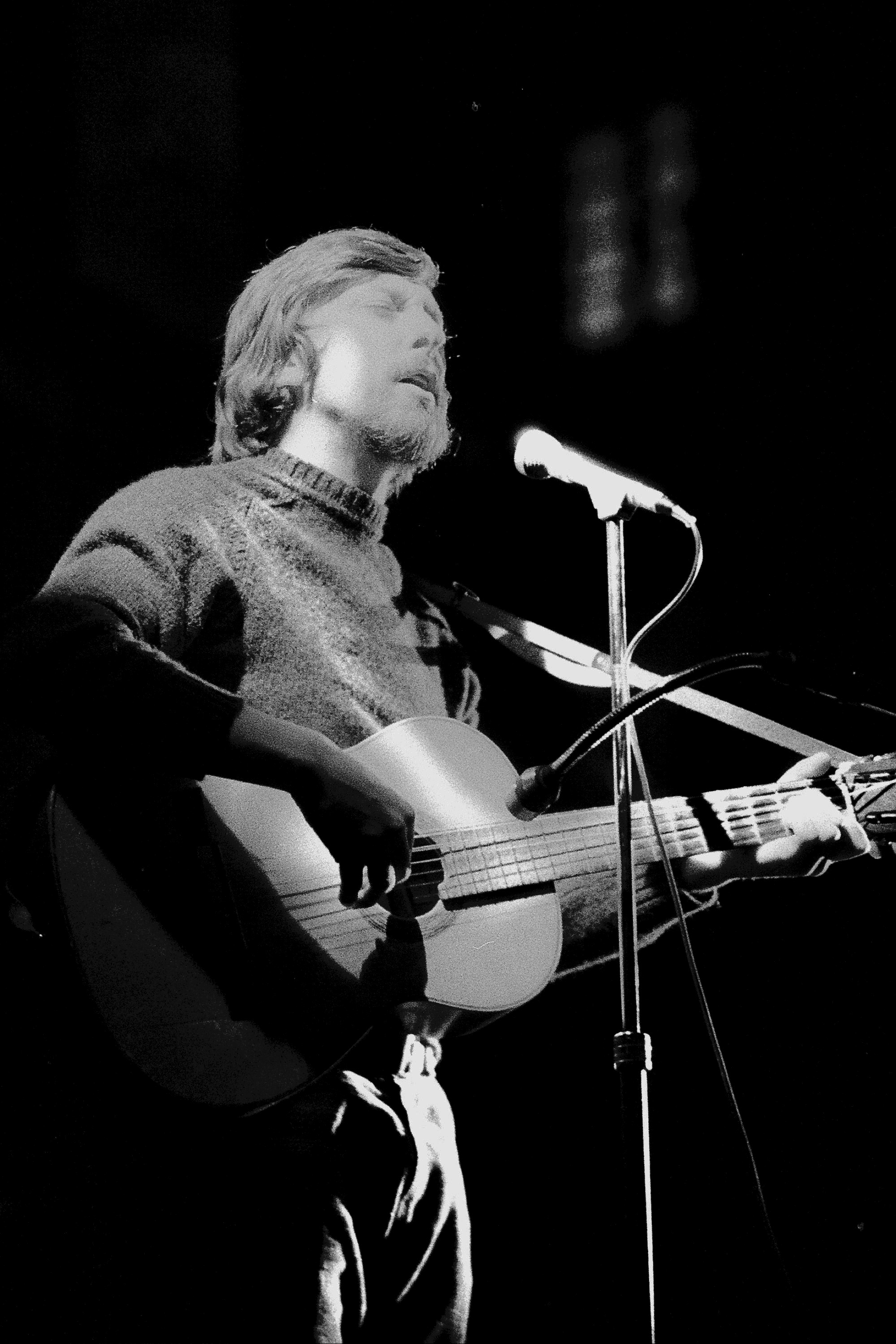
Benito Lertxundi in 1971

=== Music as identity assertion ===
Some people from the southern Basque Country fled the territory to the French Northern Basque Country and were seeking shelter. They left their imprint in the traditional Basque society of the Northern Basque Country, contributing to the rise of cultural and political awareness. Mixel Labeguerie, was mayor of Kanbo for more than a decade (1965–1980), and Councillor General of the department and a founder of Basque nationalist movement Embata, who walked out later. He had a musical education, embraced new European musical trends like Brassens, folk music from England and France, releasing an album in 1961 with songs like Gu gira Euskadiko, Primaderako liliak. He was to have influence on the new artistic Basque artist collective "Ez dok amairu" put together in 1965, largely made up of folk singer-songwriters concerned with Basque culture, like Benito Lertxundi, Mikel Laboa (popular song "Txoriak txori"), Xabier Lete, and Lourdes Iriondo.

Lourdes Iriondo took up singing accompanied on a guitar for the first time in Basque music, which was criticized on the grounds that the instrument was alien to the native culture. "Ez Dok Amairu" broke up in 1972 and its members took up separate paths that eventually confirmed some of them as acclaimed and key folk Basque singers up to the 2000s. Along the lines of singer-songwriter style, Guk, Larralde eta Etxamendi or the duo Pantxoa eta Peio provide the musical background for the 1970s period of struggle, repression and turmoil across the Northern Basque Country. In the provinces of Álava and Navarre, Enrike Zelaia (Altsasu) and Gorka Knörr struck a chord with a more folkloric and nuanced approach.

=== Shift towards urban music ===
New and more urban style musical ensembles and appeared in the 1970s, performing first to other's songs of the time at summer local festivals. They gradually developed their own repertoire fashioned in line with Basque revival and activism, special focus on the lyrics, and ongoing Western musical trends, like folk such as Gwendal, and progressive rock like Pink Floyd. As regards choral bands, Mocedades from Bilbao was founded in 1967 initially by Amaya Uranga and her two sisters, ranking second at the Eurovision Song Contest 1973.

In the same city, the prolific band Oskorri (see above) got together featuring folk music, launching their first album in 1976, where they paid homage to poet Gabriel Aresti In the Northern Basque Country, Michel Ducau and Anje Duhalde teamed up and put together the first Basque rock band, the celebrated and politically committed Errobi, releasing an album titled Errobi (1975) to critic and public acclaim. Bizi bizian ensued, probably its best, with the record company CBS considering signing a contract with them. The group disbanded (not definitely) at the top of their popularity (1979); the split came to be regarded as a "suicide".

Beginning in the mid-60s, Imanol Larzabal led a solo career as a singer/songwriter, featuring a deep voice as well as a socially committed and poetic subjects, with the collaboration of domestic and foreign poets and singers. He went through a short period in prison and came back from exile in 1977. Friend of his and son of emigrant Souletin parents, Niko Etxart came back to the Basque Country from Paris with new ideas about music in 1972, turning into a forerunner of Basque rock music (Euskal Rock&Roll in 1973, released in 1979) alongside Errobi. In the traditional Northern Basque Country, some lashed out at his looks, manners and music. He alternately performed onstage in verbenas (dancing music in local festivals) with the band Minxoriak up to 1994.

In the area of Mutriku, Itoiz, for Basque folk-pop music in 1978, Juan Carlos Perez as its lead vocalist and front-man, releasing that year the critically acclaimed album Itoiz, which contained tracks such as Hilzori, Lau teilatu etc. Akin ensemble Haizea delivered a couple of good albums during this period.

=== Rise of Basque Punk Music ===
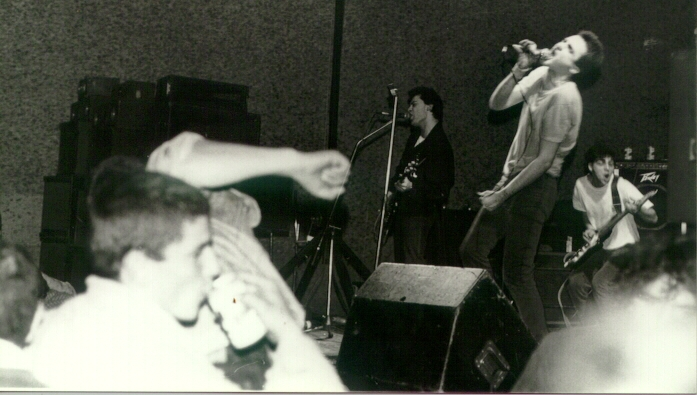
Rock band Zarama live

Up to that point, Basque music bands from the Southern Basque Country resorted to labels from Spain to record and release their works. At the end of the 1970s and notably in the early 1980s, new regional publishers arose, such as Xoxoa and Soñua, providing small bands that previously found it difficult to see their works come to light.

At the same time, a network of youth squats, the gaztetxes, appeared over the Basque Country, furnishing small bands with premises to rehearse and a venue to stage concerts. For the first time, a younger disaffected and unruly generation stemming from urban sprawls and towns could find an outlet to voice its protest along the lines of a punk outlook ("do it yourself"), but could not avoid being badly shaken by drugs. 1984 saw the surge of Basque punk rock, or Basque Radical Rock (Rock Radical Vasco in Spanish).

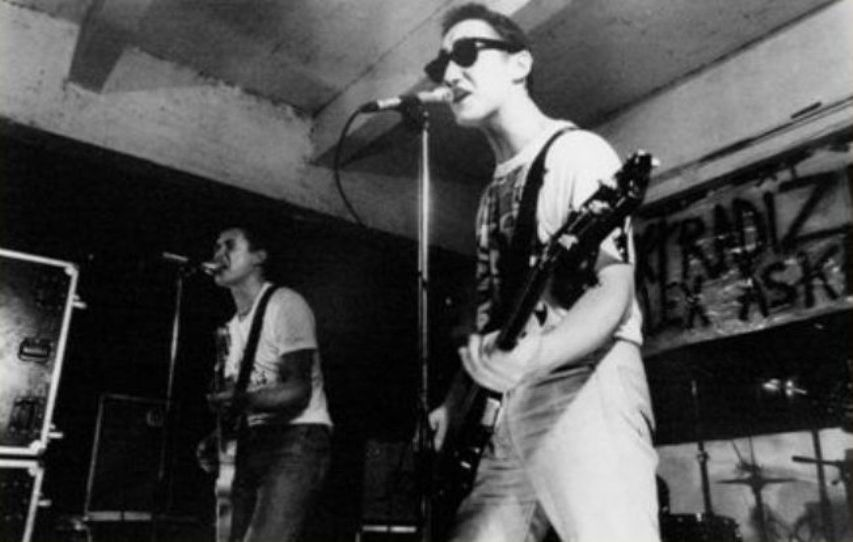
Kortatu onstage in their early years

Some popular bands jumping onto the rock scene were Zarama and Eskorbuto from Santurtzi, hard rock band Barricada and whimsical Tijuana in Blue from Pamplona, La Polla Records from Agurain, Kortatu and Baldin Bada from Irun, Hertzainak, Cicatriz and Potato from Vitoria-Gasteiz, Jotakie, RIP, Naste Borraste, MCD, BAP, Zer Bizio, Delirium Tremens, etc. Most of the times, the Spanish language was used, sometimes Basque, while other times bands were bilingual.

This new musical trend clashed with the previous singer-songwriter tradition (generation gap), with both linking to different degrees to the leftist Basque nationalist movement. Meanwhile, Itoiz kept its low-profile musical path switching to pop in the accomplished album Musikaz blai, while three more LP albums followed, featuring internationally acclaimed songs like To Alice, As Noites da Radio Lisboa or the catchy Marea gora.

Other bands of the late 1980s are gentle and even naïve, using Spanish-language lyrics and combining Spanish and international pop trends, like Duncan Dhu with leading figure Mikel Erentxun, 21 Japonesas or Sanchis y Jocano, bands from the area of San Sebastián (Donostia). Duncan Dhu attained popularity on the Spanish and international pop scene, giving rise to a tradition in ensuing years that was to be called "Donosti Sound", like Le Mans and La Oreja de Van Gogh.

== Current Popular Music ==
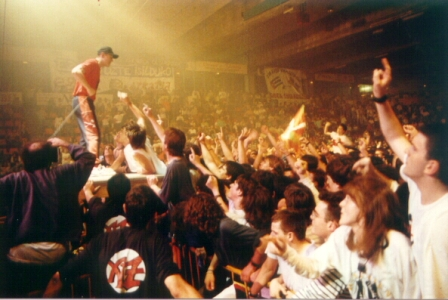
A Negu Gorriak concert in Pamplona (1992)

=== New trends ===
In 1990, Basque-language public radio station Euskadi Gaztea was founded, intending to target the youth in a young, dynamic and informal manner, besides adding information, dealing with subjects young people may be interested in and encouraging Basque groups. Basque music took from worldwide trends.

The flagship Basque rock band Kortatu broke up in 1988 (live album Azken guda dantza), and soon after brothers Muguruza put together project Negu Gorriak. They showed a different outlook compared to the previous band Kortatu. The new band sang entirely in Basque, their approach showed an open mind, while sticking to the Muguruzas' signature protest song, as showed in their acclaimed video clip Radio Rahim, that conjures up American hip-hop manners. Punk fell much in decay, while reggae as well as hardcore took over, such as Anestesia, Etsaiak, Sociedad Alkoholika, and Su Ta Gar (heavy). M-ak launched its album Barkatu ama to critical acclaim, featuring styles ranging from hardcore to gentle tracks.

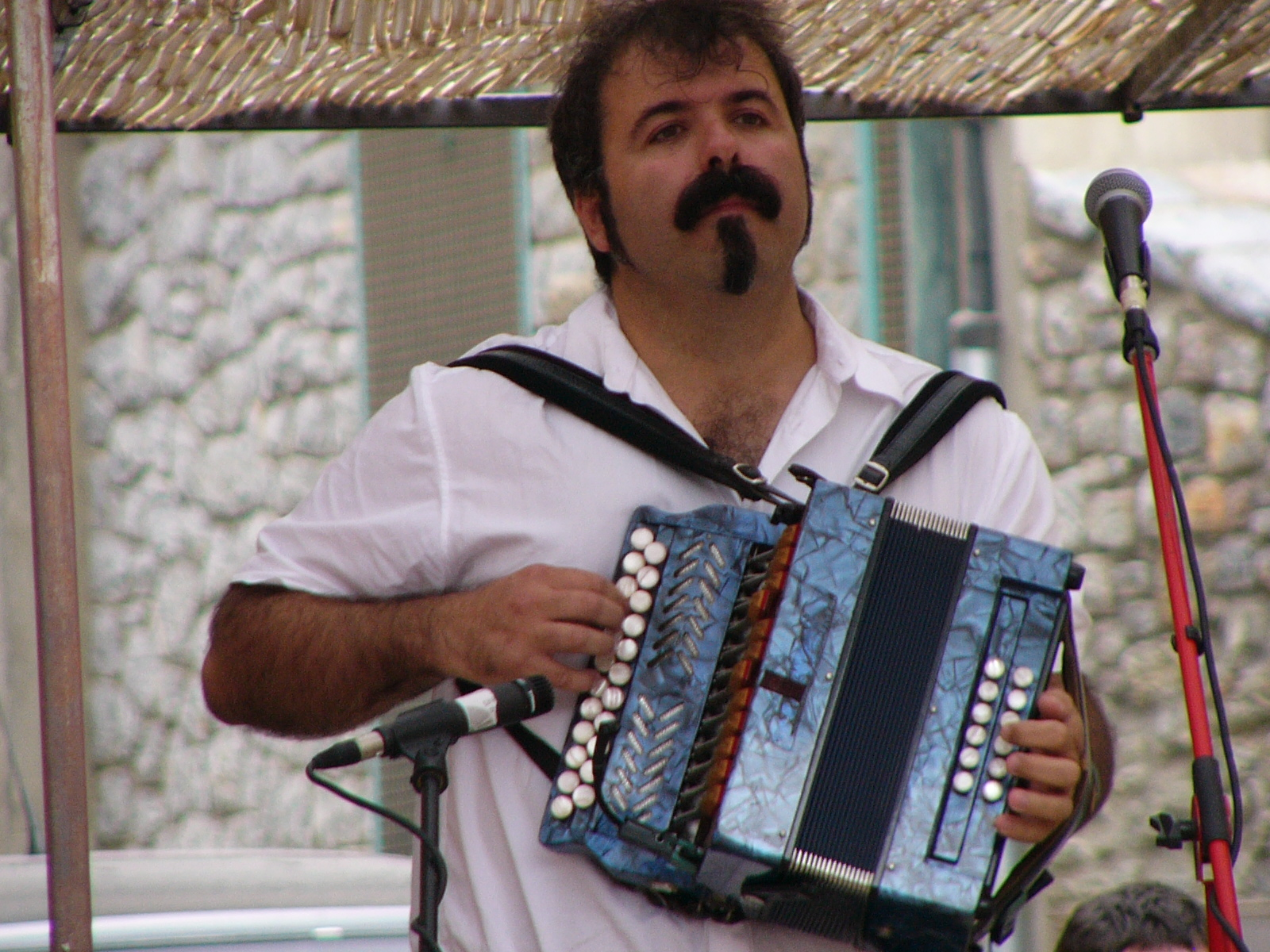
Trikitixa player Joseba Tapia

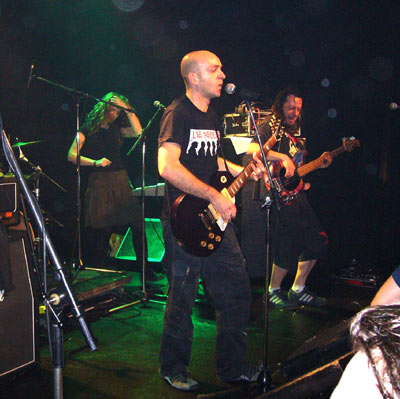
Skalariak in a 2006 concert

=== Folk and triki pop music ===
Early in the 1990s, younger generations took up folk again, finding a public that was eager to listen to milder tunes in Basque, like Sorotan Bele, and Mikel Markez. Trikitixa schools bore fruit in the 1990s: The novelties brought about by the duo Tapia eta Leturia and Kepa Junkera confirmed them as compelling folk references in the Basque Country and abroad. Novel trikitixa duos tried new ways that caught on, sometimes setting up bands including bass guitar and drums besides the set pair of diatonic button accordion and tambourine (triki pop), like Maixa eta Ixiar, Alaitz eta Maider, and Gozategi. They usually offered a cheerful repertoire, with Gozategi's song Nirekin ("Emoixtaxux muxutxuek...") hitting the summer charts in 2000 beyond language boundaries.

=== Specialization and diversification ===
Rock band Hertzainak disbanded in 1993, while its members followed their own projects. Hertzainak frontman and controversial singer Gari started up a solo and personal career with some accomplished songs that has established him as a reference in Basque music, while Josu Zabala collaborated with other singers and a bertsolari group project, like the original brass band Karidadeko Benta (first album 2003). Power pop band Urtz, formed in 1988, dealt with personal stories that slightly differed from the still prevailing protest topics and harsh language of the late 1980s, featuring an unprecedented chorus line that delivered some charming, upbeat and catchy songs. The band broke up in the early 2000s, but staged a comeback in 2013.

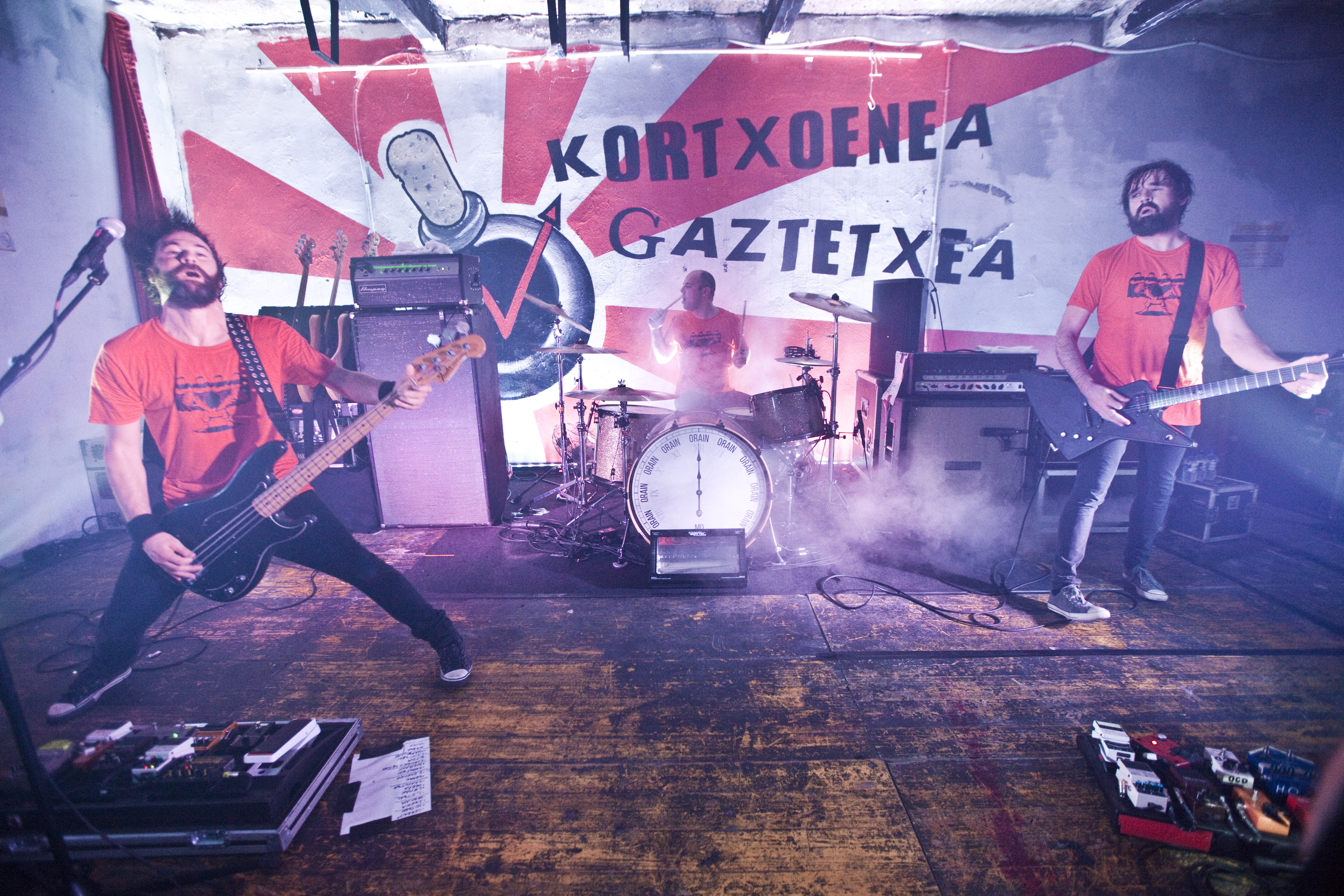
Berri Txarrak in the youth squat Kortxoenea, San Sebastián

In step with the hardcore punk tradition, the band Berri Txarrak from Lekunberri got together in 1994, releasing various albums and toured in Europe, where they come in for good reviews and gradually got a reputation that earned them performances and collaborations with important figures of indie rock across the world. In August 2017, the band announced the recording of its ninth album at The Blasting Room studio in Colorado.

The band PiLT (Mungia), who showed a taste for metal and hard sounds (Clawfinger, Soundgarden), jumped into spotlight in 1995 after winning the bootleg contest "Gaztea Sariak" granted by radio station Euskadi Gaztea, while the definite hit came in 1996 with single Hil da jainkoa, earning them widespread recognition. Likewise, heavy metal band Latzen came to public prominence after winning with the popular ballad Laztana the 1997 edition of the "Gaztea Sariak".

The bands Skalariak (1994) and Betagarri (1992) took over the ska tradition, offering boogie inciting and swinging live concerts. In step with other multicultural experiences, such as Fermin Muguruza from Negu Gorriak or festive Joxe Ripiau, in 2003, members of Etsaiak put together Pin pan pun band, a band with connections to Latin America, releasing in 2005 the DVD Kuba-Mexiko Rock Tour 04, which bore witness to their experience and live powerful concerts. Etsaiak got together again in 2008 (launched album Apurtu arte). In the French Basque Country, the festive band Sustraia attained popularity after 15 years on the road, while the sudden death of charismatic frontman Patrick Mixelena in January 2009, also known as Mixu, made the group's future uncertain.

Doctor Deseo was set up in Bilbao in 1986, releasing thereafter various albums during a period that spans more than 20 years. They deal with everyday and personal subjects in a poetic manner. Fito y los Fitipaldis (Bilbao) was formed in 1998 by Platero y Tú's frontman Fito Cabrales, comprising a variety of styles ranging from soul, blues, swing, flamenco, tex-mex or Hawaiian guitars. The project kicked off with A puerta cerrada (40,000 albums sold so far) and grew steadily in popularity, one of the latest hit song being Rojitas las orejas.

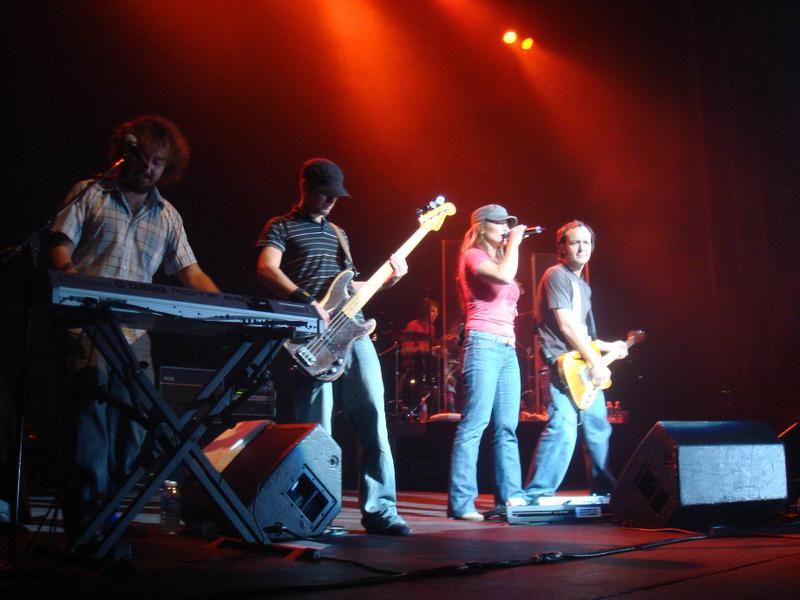
La Oreja de Van Gogh live

In San Sebastián, youths from university gathered together in the mid-90s to rehearse. They were in need of a singer for the band, and fixed up a casting meeting with Amaia Montero that resulted in the creation of La Oreja de Van Gogh, who after launching album Dile al sol took off boosted by Amaia's voice and soft tunes trimmed with beautiful arrangements. New hit songs and albums followed.

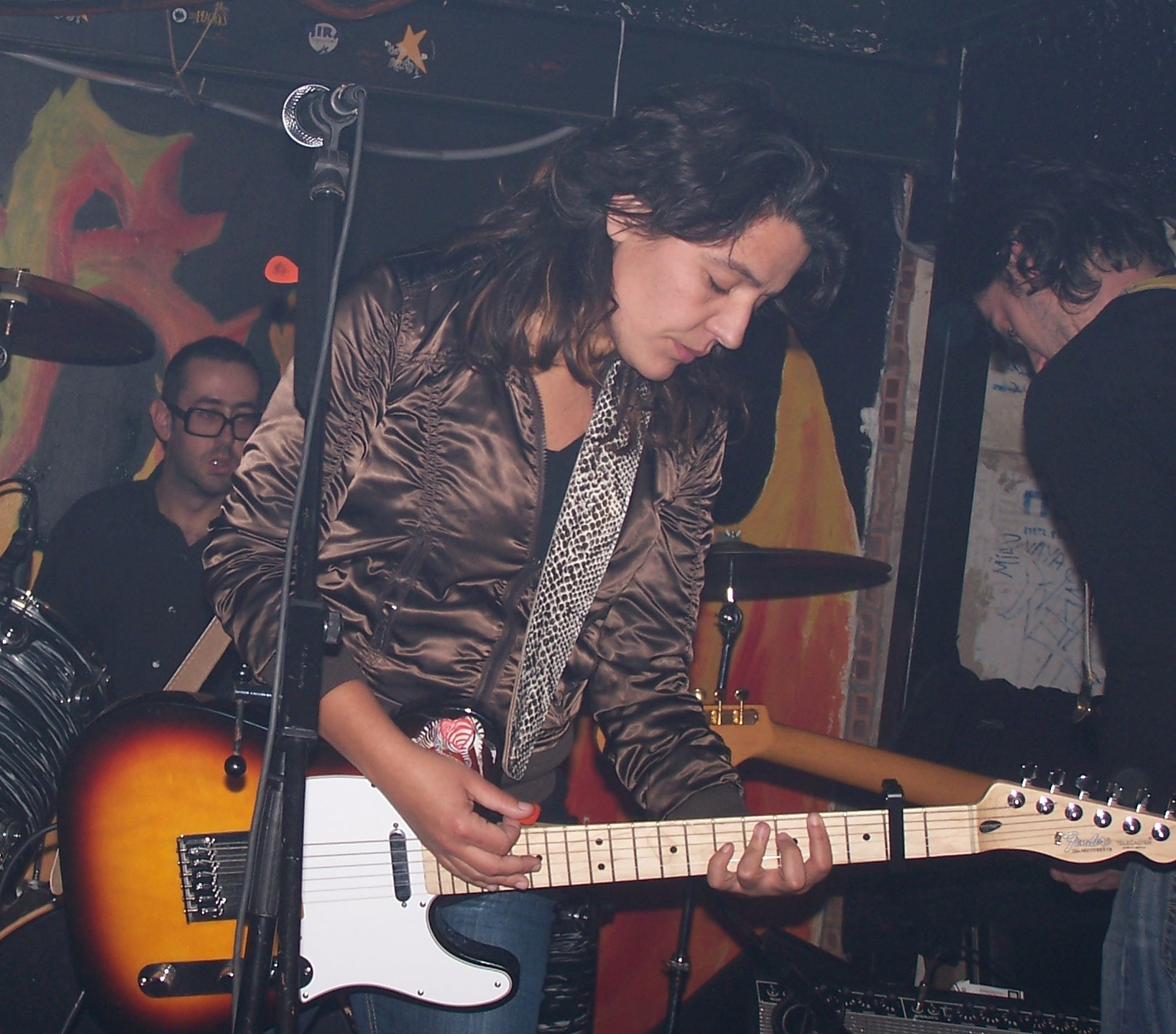
Anari at the youth squat of Ordizia

The band hailing from Zarautz Delorean has does electronic&rock with enthralling and trance raising live performances since 2000. It went international setting out on tours abroad including the United States. The band cancelled its 2013 international tour while in Mexico after a kidnapping attempt. A consistent career and musical know-how have confirmed several bands as compelling references as of 2014: Gatibu (Guernica), We Are Standard (Getxo), Atom Rhumba (Bilbao), Ken 7 ('minus seven', Guernica), Berri Txarrak (Lekunberri), and Capsula (Bilbao).

=== Singer-Songwriters and Gentle Music ===
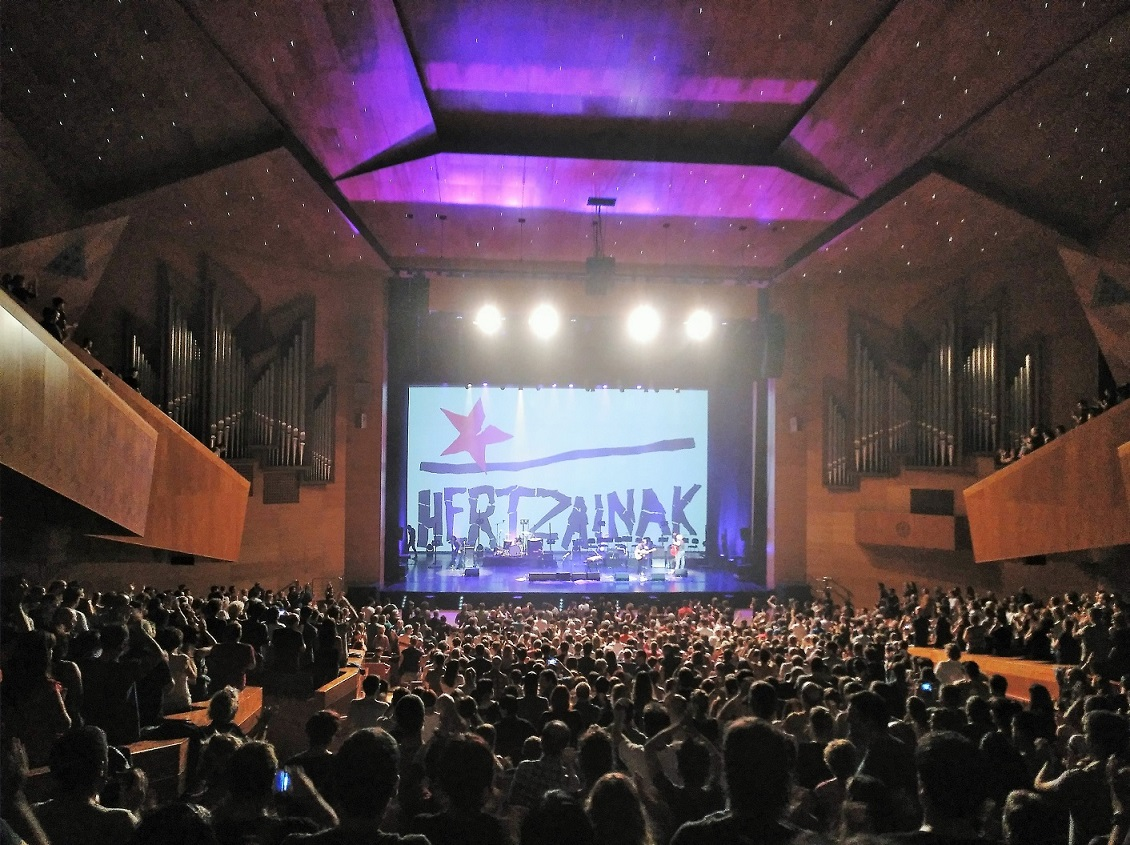
Hertzainak's reunion concert staged by Gari eta Josu Zabala (Euskalduna, Bilbao, 2019)

The singer-songwriter approach that waned in the late 1980s shows presently a sound condition in the Basque scene, with some figures like poignant Anari, renowned for her intense, heartbreaking voice and songs (live recording Anari Kafe Antzokian Zuzenean released in 2008). Other singer-songwriters include Petti, from Bera (Navarre), with four albums published up to 2008, or the bertsolari Mikel Urdangarin, featuring somewhat melancholic songs often accompanied on string and brass instruments.

Following the folk and singer-songwriter tradition, Jabier Muguruza (born 1960) took up a solo career in 1994 after quitting other projects (Les Mecaniciens,...). The veteran musician composes and performs personal, mild songs with broody and literary lyrics. Meanwhile, some renowned figures of Basque folk music have kept on performing and creating, such as Benito Lertxundi or Oskorri (fresh album Banda band in 2007). The celebrated singer-songwriter Mikel Laboa, considered a father figure of modern Basque music, died in December 2008.

The ensemble Bidaia, i.e. the couple Mixel Ducau and Caroline Phillips, offers gentle and elaborate folk music, while percussionist Benat Achiary (born 1947) provides an experimental approach, often featuring improvised passages in his performances (several albums released in the 1990s). Amaia Zubiria (born 1947 in Zubieta -Gipuzkoa-), who has occasionally collaborated with him, holds a long and prolific career in the Basque song panorama. She came to the spotlight with progressive-folk group Haizea, having published some solo albums since and featuring a pure mezzo-soprano voice. Her latest work is the album Nabil (2008).
