= San Sebastian Jazz Festival =

Festival in San Sebastian, Spain

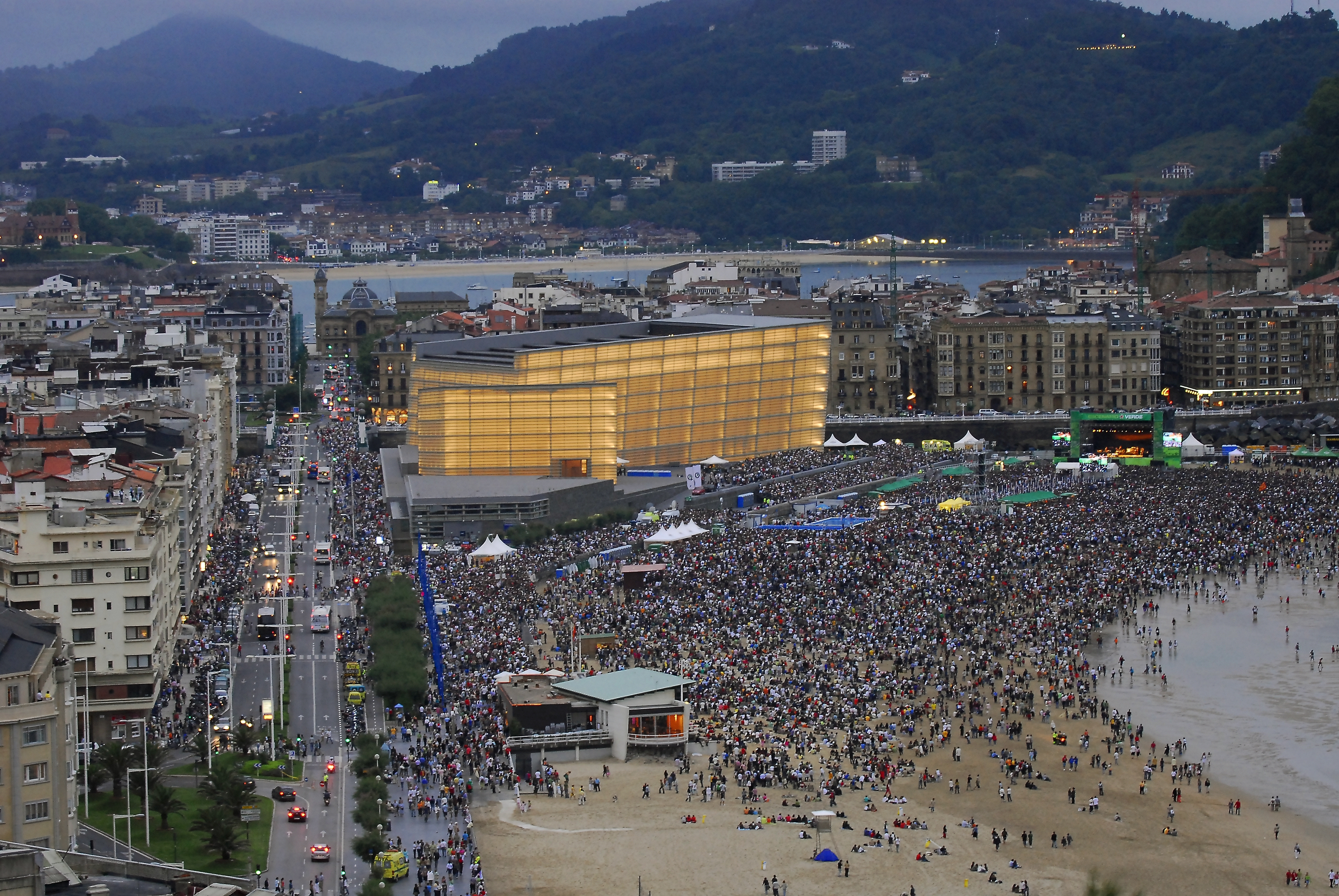
The Stage at Zurriola Beach.

Jazzaldia, more commonly known as the San Sebastian Jazz Festival, is a jazz festival in San Sebastian, Spain, held every year during the third week of July, and lasting for five days.

The festival was founded in 1966, as the first jazz festival in Spain and one of the oldest in Europe. The Jazzaldia hosts around a hundred concerts on twelve stages across the city. Some of these concerts are free and others are ticketed; and some of the venues are in the open air and some others are indoors. Among these, the concerts in Zurriola Beach and the terraces of the Kursaal Auditorium are attended by the most people.

== History ==
The first San Sebastian Jazz Festival took place on 10 and 11 September 1966. The following year the festival was moved to July, where it has remained since then. At first, Jazzaldia was an international competition for amateur groups, and the only professional performance was by Mickey Baker.

Plaza de la Trinidad (Trinity Square), a square in the old town at the foot of Mount Urgull, was chosen as the main location of the Festival. This square was built in 1963, designed by the architect Peña Ganchegui to commemorate the centenary of the demolition of the city walls. Plaza de la Trinidad has been the main focus of the festival since then. The small area means that the audience is close to the stage, but in the mid-1970s more famous artists started to perform at Jazzaldia, so more spacious venues were needed, and the shows were moved to Anoeta Velodrome and the Sports Hall.

During the first years of the festival, the programme prioritised mainstream and traditional jazz and blues, with artists such as Milt Buckner, Jo Jones, Cab Calloway, John Lee Hooker and Muddy Waters. Some years later, Jazzaldia hosted two performances by Charles Mingus in 1974 and 1977. A concert in the Velodrome by Chick Corea in 1981, attracted 15,000 people. However, over time attendance has decreased.

In 1992, the organisers decided to stop organising concerts in the Velodrome and return to the origins of the festival at Plaza de la Trinidad. Nowadays, there are a dozen stages spread through the city. The festival has increased its attendance each year, and also the age range of attendees, with Zurriola Beach the most popular venue among young people.

2020-21 saw no festival.

Artists who have appeared at the festival include Charles Mingus, Ella Fitzgerald, Oscar Peterson, Dizzy Gillespie, Miles Davis, Dexter Gordon, Art Blakey, Ray Charles, Sarah Vaughan, Stan Getz, Don Cherry, Ornette Coleman, Gerry Mulligan, Weather Report, Hank Jones, Sonny Rollins, McCoy Tyner, Wynton Marsalis, B.B. King, Diana Krall, Van Morrison, Liza Minnelli, Pat Metheny, Herbie Hancock, Chick Corea, Keith Jarrett, Esperanza Spalding, Ray Gelato, and John Zorn

== Stages ==
Jazzaldia combines indoor-ticketed concerts with free concerts performed in open air locations such as Zurriola Beach and the terraces outside the Kursaal. The stages include:

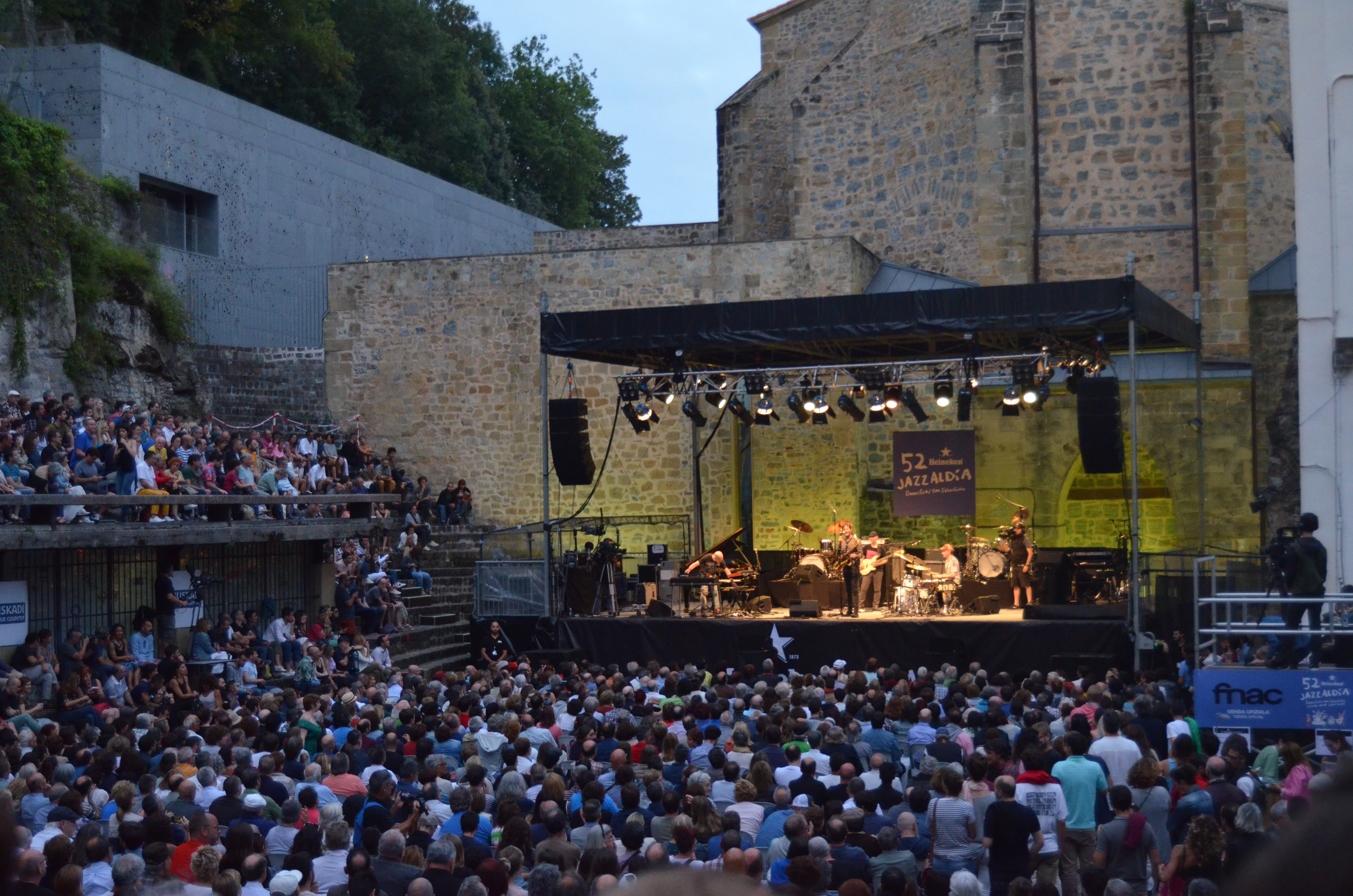
The Plaza de la Trinidad stage

- Plaza de la Trinidad, in the Old Town.
- Kursaal Auditorium, designed by the architect Rafael Moneo, a 1,800-seat auditorium whose acoustics are most appropriate for solo recitals or small formats, although the size of its stage also allows performances by large orchestras and choirs.
- Victoria Eugenia Theatre, an Italian-style theatre. The theatre was renovated between 2001 and 2007, maintaining its original appearance while technical features were upgraded.
- Victoria Eugenia Club, an underground club space situated under the main stage of the theatre above.
- San Telmo Museum, a 16th-century building which was reopened in 2011 after a restoration that added a modern wing.

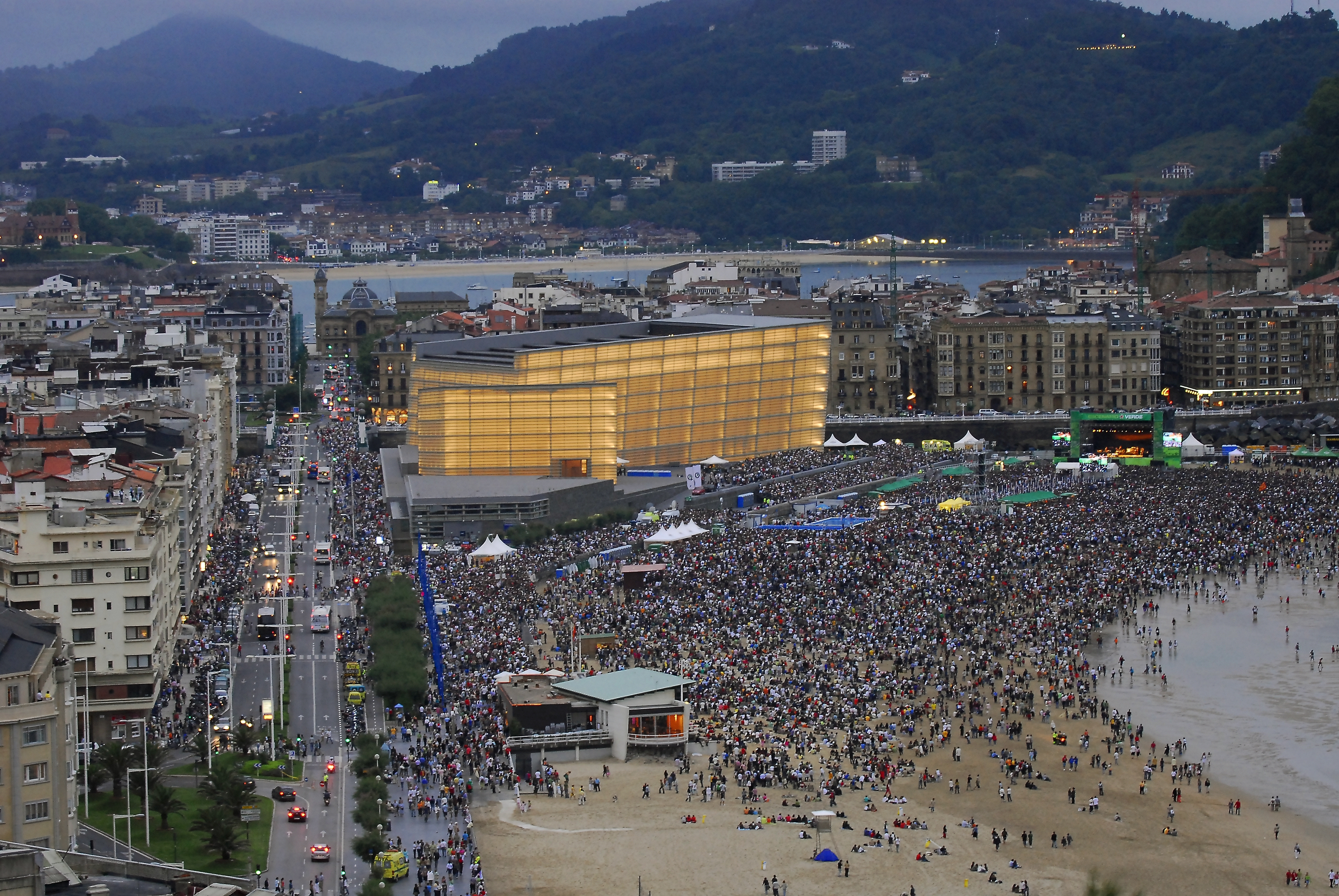
The Stage at Zurriola Beach.

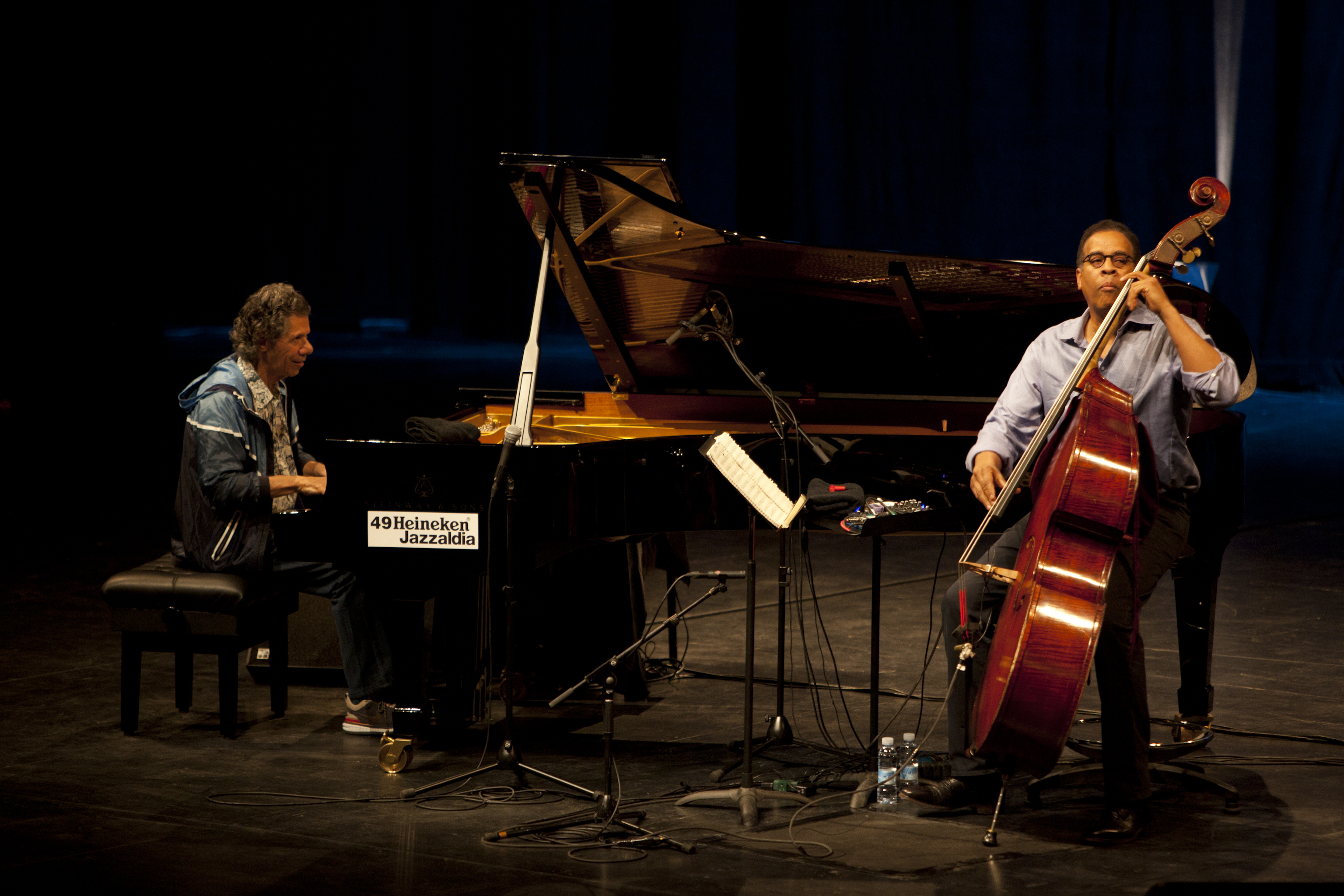
Chick Corea & Stanley Clarke at Kursaal Auditorium (2014).

- The Stage on Zurriola Beach, which stages free concerts. Situated on the beach, the stage has an unlimited capacity and attracts large crowds such as for concerts by Bob Dylan (83,000 people in 2006), Jamie Cullum (50,000 in 2013), B.B. King (41,000 in 2011), Simple Minds (40,000 in 2022) Patti Smith (20,000 in 2010) and Bobby McFerrin with Orfeón Donostiarra (18,000 in 2008).
- Kursaal Terraces: There are three stages that are located on the terraces of the Kursaal, facing the sea and next to the beach. A diverse audience enjoys the free open-air concerts held on these stages where performances by emerging artists and local groups are common.
- Nauticool, located in the terrace of the Yacht Club (Club Náutico), next to the harbour.
- Other venues are: Kutxa Kultur, Tabakalera, Chillida Leku...

== Donostiako Jazzaldia Award ==
Since 1994, Jazzaldia has presented an award to one of the artists performing at the festival, in recognition of their contribution to jazz and influence on following generations of musicians. The award is a plaque engraved with an image of Plaza de la Trinidad.

Winners of the award include:

- 1994: Doc Cheatham
- 1995: Phil Woods
- 1996: Hank Jones
- 1997: Steve Lacy
- 1998: Chick Corea
- 1999: Max Roach and Clark Terry
- 2000: Kenny Barron
- 2001: Ray Brown
- 2002: Elvin Jones
- 2003: Bebo Valdés
- 2004: Shirley Horn and Fernando Trueba
- 2005: Keith Jarrett and Charles Mingus (in memoriam)
- 2006: Herbie Hancock
- 2007: Wayne Shorter
- 2008: Ahmad Jamal
- 2009: Roy Haynes
- 2010: Ron Carter
- 2011: Toots Thielemans
- 2012: Jimmy Cobb and Pierre Lafont (in memoriam)
- 2013: Lee Konitz and Juan Claudio Cifuentes
- 2014: Toshiko Akiyoshi
- 2015: Benny Golson
- 2016: Ellis Marsalis
- 2017: Charles Lloyd
- 2018: Mary Stallings and Michel Portal
- 2019: John Zorn
- 2020: Jorge Pardo, Chano Domínguez and Iñaki Salvador
- 2021: Chucho Valdés and La Locomotora Negra
- 2022: Amina Claudine Myers and Mulatu Astatke
- 2023: Abdullah Ibrahim, Enrico Rava and Yosuke Yamashita
- 2024: William Parker

== Bibliography ==
- TORQUEMADA, Jesús. Jazzaldia 50. Victoria Eugenia Antzokia, S. A. 2015. ISBN 978-84-608-5119-6
