= José Maria Nemesio Otaño =

Spanish musicologist (1880–1956)

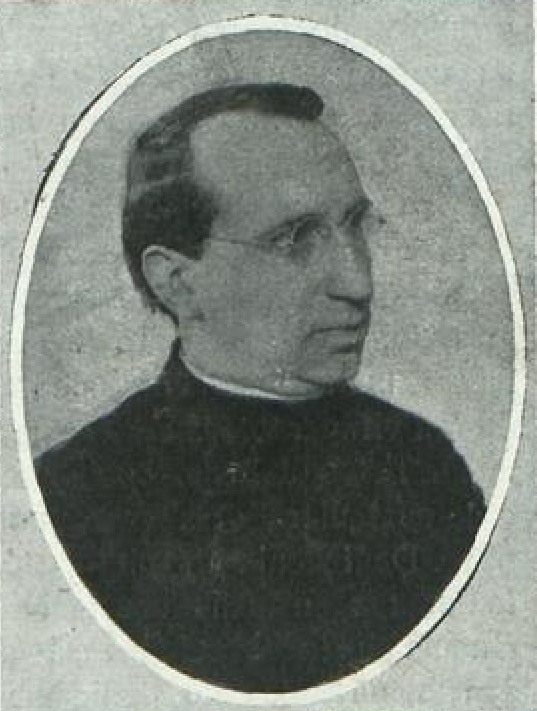
Nemesio Otaño

Padre José Maria Nemesio Otaño y Eguino (Azcoitia, Guipúzcoa, 19 December 1880 - San Sebastián, Guipúzcoa, 29 April 1956) was a Spanish musicologist and composer.

== See also ==
- Basque music
