= Mikel Laboa =

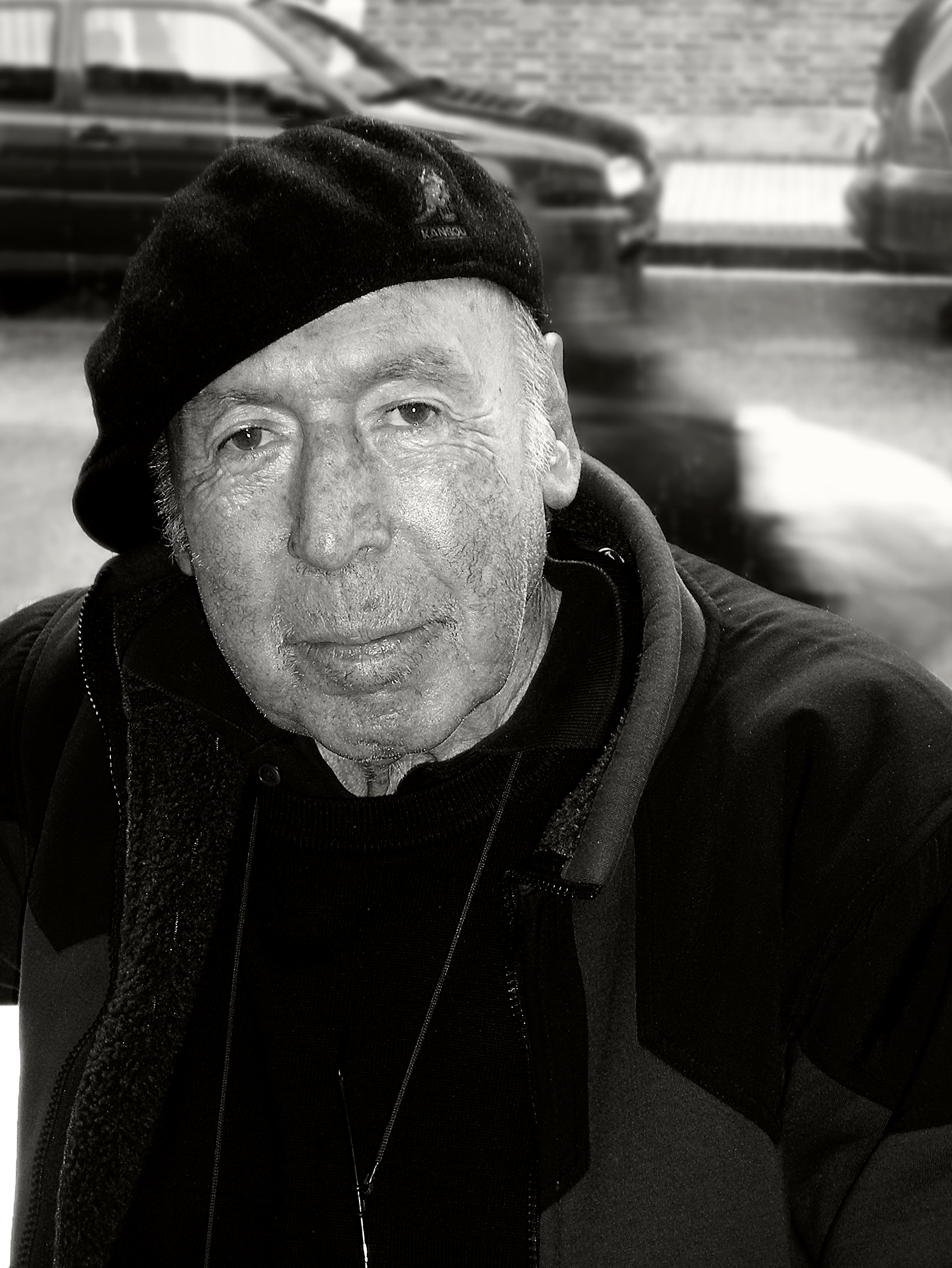
- Laboa in 2007 (a year before his death)

Background information
- Born: Mikel Laboa Mancisidor; 15 June 1934; San Sebastián, Gipuzkoa, Spain
- Died: 1 December 2008 (aged 74) San Sebastián, Gipuzkoa, Spain
- Occupations: Singer-songwriter, musician
- Years active: 1958–2006

Mikel Laboa Mancisidor (15 June 1934 – 1 December 2008) was s Spanish Basque singer-songwriter. He was one of the Basque Country's most important singer-songwriters.

Considered the patriarch of Basque music, his music has had an influence on younger generations. A testament to this is the tribute album Txerokee, Mikel Laboaren Kantak ("Cherokee: Songs of Mikel Laboa"), published in 1991 by various younger-generation rock and folk music groups. His album Bat-Hiru ("One-Three") was chosen in a reader poll by the local Diario Vasco newspaper as the greatest Basque album in history. Nearly all of his songs are sung in Basque.

== Biography ==
Mikel Laboa was born 15 June 1934 in San Sebastián, Gipuzkoa.

He spent nearly two years of his childhood in the town of Lekeitio, Bizkaia. In the 1950s he studied medicine and psychiatry in Pamplona-Iruña. He would constantly balance his artistic career with his medical career, which began at the Children's Neuropsychiatry unit at Patronato San Miguel in San Sebastián, where he worked for almost 20 years.

During his student years he became interested in music, influenced by artists such as Atahualpa Yupanqui and Violeta Parra. Following in their footsteps, Laboa would likewise identify himself as a "political artist." In 1958 he made his debut at the Teatro Gayarre in Pamplona.

During the 1960s he, along with other Basque artists including singer Lourdes Iriondo, Xabier Lete and Benito Lertxundi, founded the cultural group Ez Dok Amairu ("There is no 13"), which in many ways sought to revitalize Basque culture, long dormant under the Francoist regime. They dedicated their focus on the revival and social status of the Basque language. Within this group Laboa came into his own, emerging along with Benito Lertxundi as a prime example of what was called "new Basque music."

Laboa's music can be described as a combination of tradition, poetry and experimentalism, in the songwriting style of the 1960s and 1970s, but endowed with a strong personal touch and a unique voice. His work combines old standards reinterpreted in modern style, lyrical poetry from authors such as Bertolt Brecht, and suitable compositions. Deserving special mention are his Lekeitioak, experimental songs based on shouts and onomatopoetic sounds.

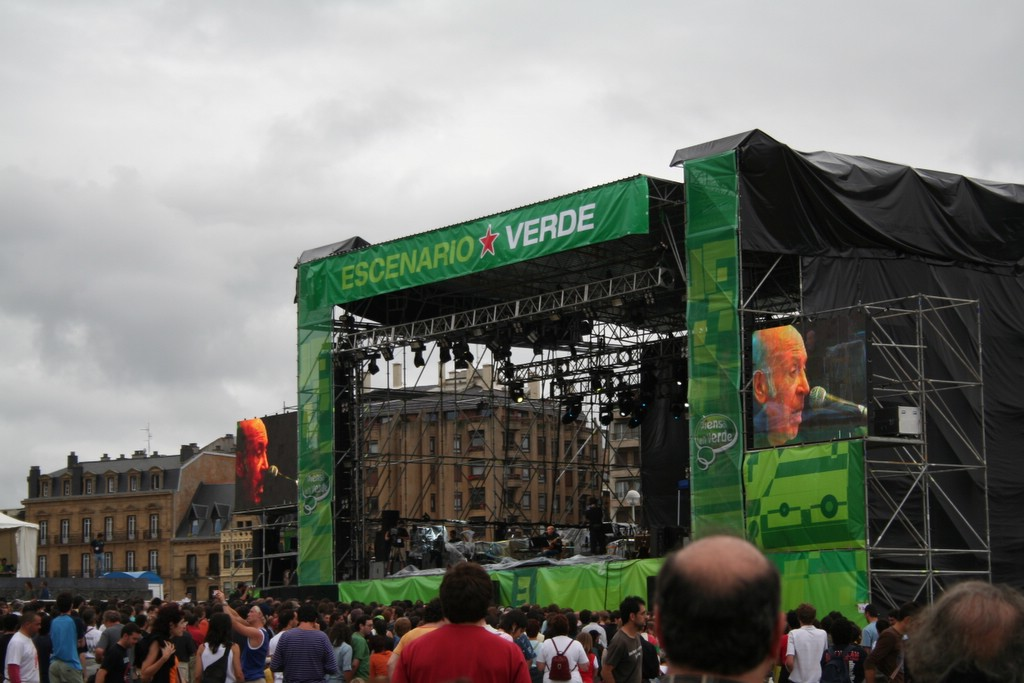
Mikel Laboa's final concert, 11 July 2006 in San Sebastián

Laboa was a creative force for 35 years, continuing well into his old age until his fragile health kept him away from the stage. He would collaborate often with jazz musician Iñaki Salvador and worked with the Orfeón Donostiarra and other orchestral groups from the Basque Country. Some of his most well-known songs are featured in La pelota vasca ("The Basque ball"), a documentary by Julio Medem. On 11 July 2006 he gave his final performance, opening for Bob Dylan at a "Concert for Peace" held in the city of San Sebastián.

A curious feature of his album titles is the fact that they are numeric. This custom began in 1974 with the release of his two-disc Bat-Hiru (1–3). The album 2, with songs based on the writings of Brecht, had been banned by Francoist censorship. This was followed by the double LP Lau-Bost (4–5) and 6. His Lekeitios comprised albums 7 through 11, although only a compilation of these was released through low-key marketing. These were followed by 12, and Laboa skipped number 13 in homage to the group Ez Dok Amairu, whose name means "There's no 13" in Basque. Afterwards, he released 14, and his live albums 15 and 16. Not including compilations and posthumous editions, his last release was 17 (Xoriek).

His final collaboration was with the Pasaia group Naizroxa, where he contributed to the first and only song on the first disc, "Iqharaturic."

Mikel Laboa died 1 December 2008 at a hospital in San Sebastián at the age of 74.

== Honors ==
- 2000: Medalla de Oro of the UPV-EHU
- 2008: Medalla de Oro of the Provincial Council of Gipuzkoa
- 2018: a square in the quarter Antiguo of San Sebastián is named after Laboa

== Discography ==
Throughout his life, Laboa published 17 records. Three more appeared posthumously.

- Azken, 1964
- Mikel Laboa, 1966
- Bertolt Brecht'en lau poema Mikel Laboa'ren abotsean, 1969
- Mikel Laboa, 1969
- Bat-Hiru, 1974
- Lau-bost, 1980
- 6 (Sei), 1985
- Euskal Kanta Berria, 1987
- Lekeitioak, 1988
- 12 (Hamabi), 1989
- 14 (Hamalau), 1994
- Mikel Laboa, 1995
- Zuzenean, 1997
- Gernika-zuzenean 2, 2000
- 60ak+2, 2003
- Xoriek – 17, 2005
- Lekeitioak (2-CD), 2007
- Mikel Laboa (1934-2008) DVD, 2009
- Mikel Laboa "in memoriam", 2008
- Gernika (Lekeitio 4) 1972. Remix, 1937-2012. Bi bertsioren arteko elkarrizketa. Diálogo entre dos versiones. 2012
