= Xabier Lete =

Basque writer

Xabier Lete Bergaretxe (April 5, 1944 – December 4, 2010) was a Basque writer, poet, singer and politician. He started to write from an early age, and he often published articles in the magazine "Zeruko Argia". In 1965 he created a band of Basque Music with Mikel Laboa, Benito Lertxundi, Joxean Artze, Jose Angel Irigarai and Lourdes Iriondo. The band, which was called "Ez Dok Amairu", disappeared in 1972, but Xabier Lete kept on singing with Lourdes Iriondo, who, by that time, had become his wife.

In 1968, Lete published his first book of poems and in October 2009 he won the Basque Literature Award for his last book of poems "Egunsentiaren esku izotzak" (Frozen hands of the dawn). He received a hard blow in 2005 when his wife Lourdes died after an illness. In April 2009, Lete was made member of Jakiunde, the Basque Academy of Science, Art and Letters, and in 2010, he was named member of honor of the Academy of the Basque Language. Xabier Lete died that same year, on December 4, due to a serious illness and after stays in two different hospitals.

== Biography ==
=== Singer ===
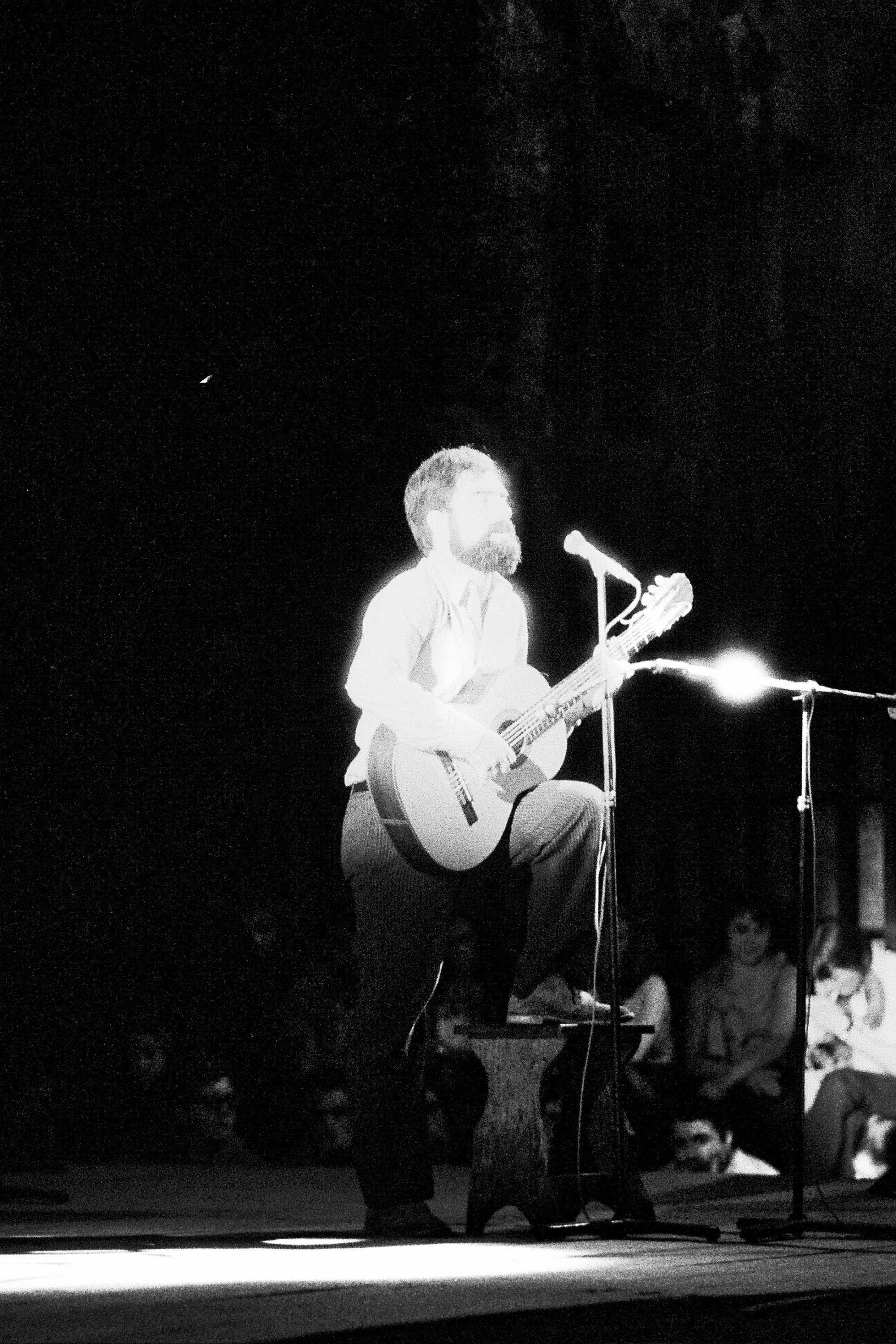
Xabier Lete during a performance of the band Ez Dok Amairu on September 9, 1971

Xabier Lete was born in Oiartzun, Gipuzkoa, on April 5, 1944. He studied in La Salle school in Herrera, San Sebastián. After graduating high school, he went to Tarragona to do technical studies, but he did not finish them. Instead, he went to the cinema and spent his time reading. When he returned to the Basque Country, he started to work in a factory in Pasaia (Gipuzkoa), where he started to write his first poems. He had been an enthusiastic about reading since he was young, and he started to write early. He started to write for the "Zeruko Argiak" magazine in 1965. Xabier Lete also had a close relationship with the world of acting, being a member of the group Lartaun in Oiartzun. He met Joxean Artze thanks to Julen Lekuona, an acquaintance from his town.

He took part in the birth of the group Ez Dok Amairu, and it was Jorge Oteiza the man who gave the name to the band. This well-known sculptor's dream was to create a movement for the recovery of the Basque Culture, which would gather all the artistic disciplines. In the area of music, that goal had its answer in the band Ez Dok Amairu. These were years of Francoist Spain. But enough Basques were willing to do something to improve the situation, and thus, answering that desire, the songs became screams. Unfortunately, in 1970 the band broke up after they performed the "Baga, biga, higa" show.

Lete collaborated with other singers, such as Antton Valverde, for instance, with whom he gave voice to the poems of Lizardi and of Txirrita between 1975 and 1978. Xabier Lete also worked in the world of acting with the aim of setting the foundation for a modern Basque theatre. He met Eugenio Arozena at that time and he worked with him. The works that emerged from that cooperation led to new groups of theatre in Oiartzun.

The most important part of Lete's songs are the underlying poems and the words that are said in them, even though the music was very often composed by him too. Apart from his own words, Lete also sang other singers' songs, such as Lizardi's or Jacques Brel's. In the same way, other singers have also used Lete's poems for their musical works, such as Mikel Laboa, Antton Valverde, Imanol Larzabal or Benito Lertxundi, for example.

=== Poet ===
Lete started to write poetry in 1964 and published his first book of poems in 1968: "Egunetik egunera orduen gurpilean" (From day to day in the wheels of the hours). In this work it was noticeable the influence of Gabriel Aresti's social poetry and Lete used his words to denounce the societal injustices of the time. That is why he criticized poets who avoided upsetting those in power or who simply got lost in stylistic games avoiding dealing with social realities.

His second book of poems was published in 1974 and its name was "Bigarren poema liburua" (Second book of poems). This work was much more intimate than the first one. Influenced by French existentialist philosophy, Lete reflected more on topics such as life and death.

The next book of poems came in 1981: "Urrats desbideratuak" (The diverted steps) in which the language became stronger and the poems reflected pessimism and despair giving way to philosophical thoughts influenced by Nietzsche.

Once he recovered from an illness he had, Lete published his fourth book of poems in 1992: "Zentzu antzanldatuen poemategia" (The book of poems of transmuted senses). He received the Felipe Arrese Beitia poetry prize, given by Euskaltzaindia (The Academy of the Basque Language). Shortly afterwards, a revised edition of that book came out with a different name: "Biziaren ikurrak" (The symbols of life).

In 2009, Lete received an award for his book of poems "Egunsentiaren esku izotzak" and that same year he was made member of Jakiunde, the Basque Academy of Science, Art and Letters. He died in San Sebastián on December 4, 2010.

=== Politician ===
After his third publication, Lete abandoned for a while the world of literature to fully get into politics. During the 80's he occupied the posts of General Director, then Councillor, after that he got into the Department of Culture of Gipuzkoa's Local Council, but due to health problems, he definitely gave up public activity.

== Discography ==
- Xabier Lete (1974, Elkar)
- Bertso zaharrak (1974, Elkar). Collection of old poetries created with Antton Valverde and Julen Lekuona.
- Txirritaren bertsoak (1975, Elkar). Created with Antton Valverde.
- Xabier Lete eta Lurdes Iriondoren 4 disko txikiren bilduma (LP 33 r.p.m.) (1976, Edigsa)
- Kantatzera noazu (1976, Elkar).
- Lore bat, zauri bat (1977, Elkar)
- Eskeintza (1991, Elkar)
- Hurbil iragana (1992, Elkar). Collection.
- Berrehun urtez bertsotan (2001, Elkar). Long collections of poetries.
- R.M.Rielkeren "Orduen Liburua" (2004, Pamiela)
- Xabier Lete Zuzenean. Errenteria 1999.IX.25. Azken Konztertua (2 Live CD) - (2010, A&M Kultur Promotora).
