= Jaio.Musika.Hil =

Studio album by Berri Txarrak
- Released: 2005
- Recorded: 2005
- Genre: Alternative metal, post-hardcore
- Length: 38:21
- Label: Gor Diskak
- Producer: Ed Rose

Berri Txarrak chronology
Libre © (2003)	Jaio.Musika.Hil (2005)

Jaio.Musika.Hil is the fifth studio album by Basque alternative rock band Berri Txarrak and the first one as a power trio without the guitar player Aitor Oreja as a member of the band. It was released in 2005.

== Track listing ==
1. Zertarako amestu
2. Berba eta irudia
3. Oreka
4. Iparra galdu: Hegora joan
5. Jaio.Musika.Hil
6. Onak eta txarrak
7. Iraultza Txikien Asanblada
8. Bueltatzen
9. Kezkak
10. Isiltzen banaiz
11. Breyten
12. Gelaneuria

== Critical recognition ==
Professional ratings
Review scores
Source	Rating
Punk Updates	8.5/10 stars
Punknews.org	4/5 stars

Rock Estatal - Best album of 2005
