= Nire aitaren etxea defendituko dut =

Poem by Basque language poet Gabriel Aresti

Nire aitaren etxea defendituko dut (transl. I shall defend my father's house) is the best known poem by Basque language poet Gabriel Aresti (1933–1975). It was first published in the book Harri eta Herri ("Stone and People/Country") in 1964. Gabriel Aresti, using the metaphor of the "father's house" makes a claim to defend the Basque Country.

This poem could be one of the poem with most translations in the world. Patxi Oroz Arizkuren published a book with 740 translations in 2017.
