= Ez Dok Amairu =

Basque avant-garde cultural movement

Ez Dok Amairu was the name of a Basque avant-garde cultural movement that between 1966 and 1972 dedicated itself to recovering Basque culture and renewing it.

== Background ==
Video explaining Ez Dok Amairu and the Basque song of the 20th century. Subtitles available.

Emerging within the Euskal Kantagintza Berria (New Basque Song) movement and composed mainly of singers and writers in Basque, it also included artists from other disciplines. The song was a means to launch new messages of hope, justice, peace and freedom. It was about creating a new identity, denouncing injustice, expressing the need to create a people's conscience, transmitting hope and bringing literature closer to the people. As the song was the means to spread the message, festivals became a pretext for people to get together.

In addition to the cultural characteristics, it contained political and social elements of protest in the midst of the Franco dictatorship. Its development coincided with similar movements in other areas of Spain, such as the case of Els Setze Jutges within the Nova Cançó in Catalonia or the Manifesto Canción del Sur, in Andalusia.

The name of the movement was proposed by the sculptor Jorge Oteiza in 1965 based on a Basque folk tale, San Martinen estutatusuna (Saint Martin's plight), collected by Resurrección Mª de Azkue, which concluded with the phrase "Ez dok amairu" (literal translation "there is no 13"), which means that "there is no curse", that the curse of thirteen had been broken. Oteiza's dream was to unite all disciplines in order to recover the punished Basque culture. The musical field was where he established himself best.

In 1970 the group presented the show Baga biga higa sentikaria, a proposal that would represent a significant change, both aesthetically and musically, in the new Basque song.

In 1971 Benito Lertxundi released an album with the title "Ez dok amairu" which included the well-known songs "Zenbat Gera" and "Urak dakarrena".

The group dissolved in 1972, when Franco's dictatorship was ending. Since then, several of its members have followed their own path and have become a reference in Basque music and culture.

== Members ==
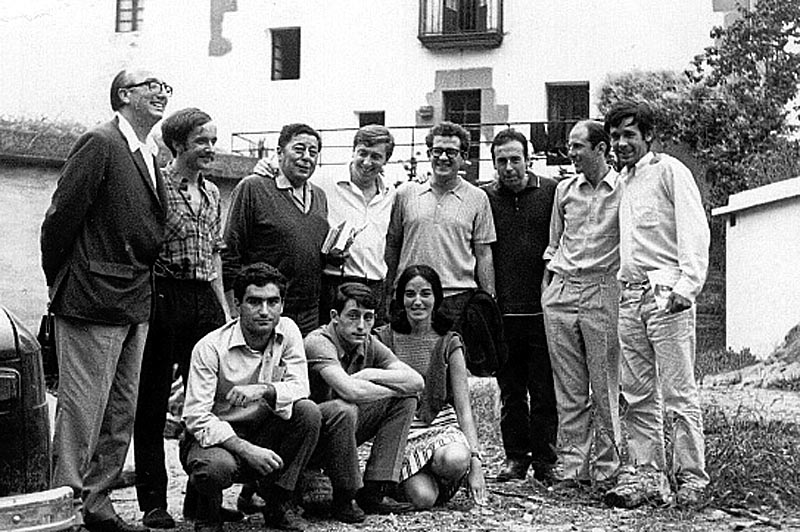
Some members of Ez Dok Amairu with Atahualpa Yupanqui (the third from the left) and Paco Ibañez (the last on the right): Joxan Artze (second from the left), Benito Lertxundi (forth), Mikel Laboa (sixth), Xabier Lete (the first from the left crouched) and Lourdes Iriondo

These are the most prominent members of Ez Dok Amairu.

- Joxan Artze
- Jexux Artze
- Nestor Basterretxea
- Jose Angel Irigarai
- Lourdes Iriondo
- Mikel Laboa
- Julen Lekuona
- Benito Lertxundi
- Xabier Lete
- Jorge Oteiza
