= Amaia Zubiria =

Spanish-Basque singer (born September 11, 1947)

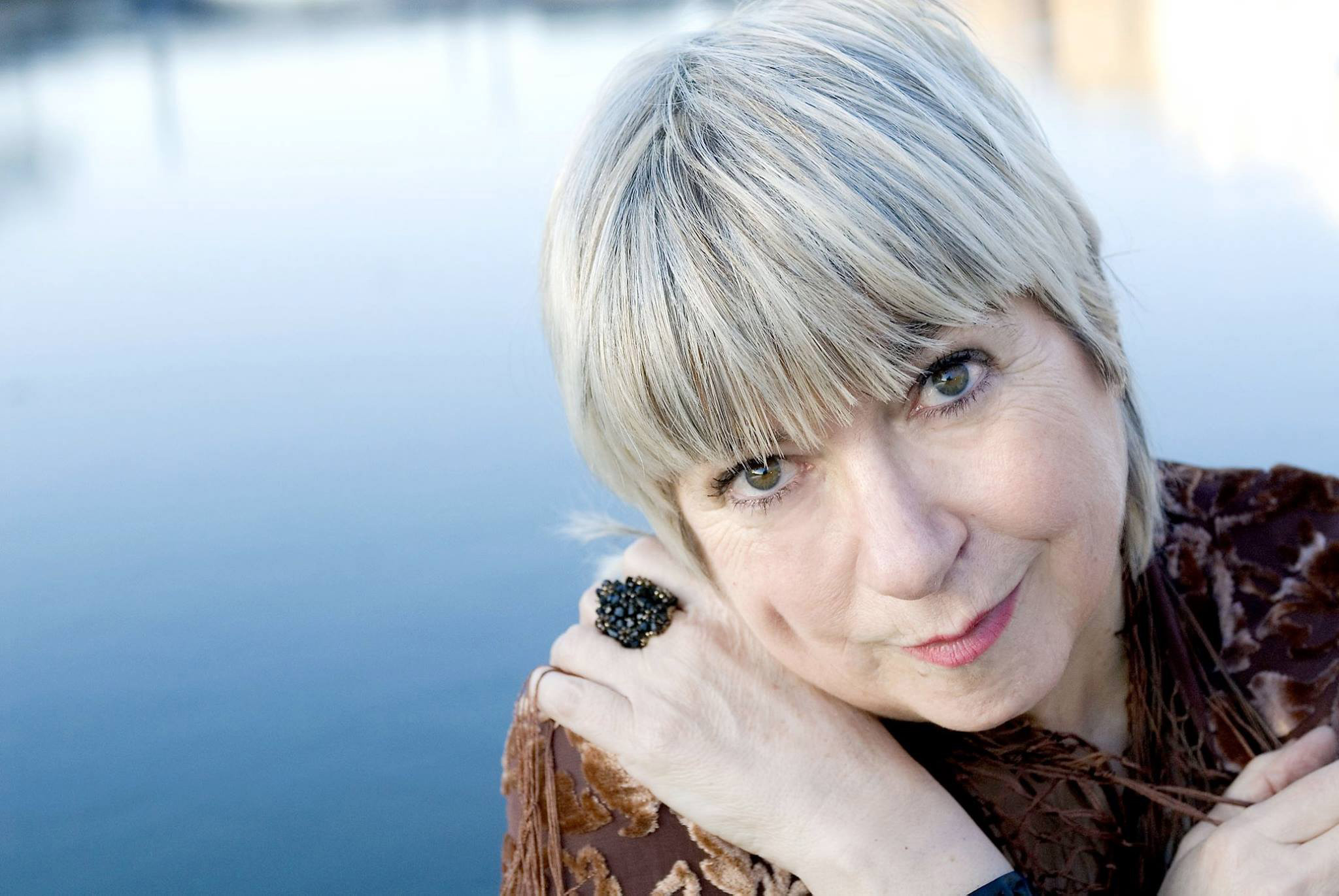
Amaia Zubiria

Amaia Zubiria (born September 11, 1947, in San Sebastián in the Basque province of Gipuzkoa) is a Spanish-Basque singer-songwriter. She started singing with Txomin Artola with whom she formed the Haizea band. She toured the Basque Country, singing adaptations of the local folk songs. She has recorded several albums since 1985, some with other singers such as Pascal Gaigne, some as a soloist.

In 1993, she began singing solo with Amonaren Mengantza which she sang at Mexico's Durango Festival in 1995. Together with Gaigne, Luis Camio and José Angel Lorán, she sang Sustrai zahar and Kimu berri based on her research into Basque folklore.

For soundtrack of the film La fuga de Segovia (1981) she sang Maite zaitut Maite. She went on to contribute to the films Zergatik Panpox (1986), Ander eta Yul (1989), Loraldia (1991) and Santa Cruz, el cura guerrillero (1991). She has also collaborated with the artists Angel Illarmendi, Julia León, Josean Goikoetxea and Iñaki Salvador. Her voice can also be heard in the animated film La isla del cangrejo and in Yoyes, both of which received awards.

In 2001, Zubiria was a member of the jury for the Basque Singers' Championship. Her album Haatik (2002) presents highlights from her career together with six new tracks.
