= Atom Rhumba =

- Origin: Bilbao, Basque Country
- Genres: Swamp rock punk blues Garage punk
- Years active: 1996 - Present
- Labels: Oihuka, Munster
- Members: Rober!, Joseba Irazoki, Jaime Nieto, Andoni Etxebeste
- Website: Official Website

Atom Rhumba is a Basque band formed in Bilbao in 1996.

Their sound may be described as a mix of late 1970s New York rock (ROIR cassettes) and 1950s rock'n'roll fuelled by a strong and primitive rhythm section definitely influenced by James Brown.

All their members come from the metropolitan area of Bilbao. Although they had a constantly fluid line-up, Rober!, singer and main composer, has been in control of the band from the beginning.

Notorious for their incendiary live act, the raw sound of their records (they always play live in the studio) and critical acclaim.

== Current line up ==
- Rober!: voice, guitar, some keyboards
- Jaime Nieto: bass, keyboards
- Andoni Etxebeste: drums
- Joseba Irazoki: guitar

== Discography ==
=== Albums ===
- Cosmic Lexicon (2018, El Segell del Primavera)
- Gargantuan Melee (2010, Brian's Records)
- Amateur Universes 2LP/CD (2006, Oihuka Records)
- Backbone Ritmo LP/CD (2003, Munster Records)
- Chasin' The Onagro LP/CD (2001, Munster Records) - produced by Mick Collins
- Dirt Shots 10"/CD (2000, Munster Records)
- Hormonal Riot LP/CD (1997, Munster Records)

=== Other ===
- Josetxo Anitua & Atom Rhumba CD (2005, Noizpop Records) Recorded live with Josetxo Anitua as a singer, including covers of Doc Pomus, Marc Bolan, Velvet Underground, Caetano Veloso, Jonathan Richman & The Modern Lovers, Them and Art Ensemble of Chicago.
- Concrete Mixer LP/CD (2005, Munster Records) Remixes of Backbone Ritmo by Dj Amsia y Carlotta Lotta Love, Templar & Birdy, Kaki Arkarazo, Javi P3z, Akauzazte, Xabier Erkizia, Josetxo & Murky, Manta Ray, Javi Letamendia and -gailu featuring Anari.
- Gone MaxiCd/Maxi (Munster Records, 2004, MRCD262) Gone - Gone(Gone Clone) - Gone(Piccolini remix)
- "Techno Boy"/"Gimme Chaos" (Munster Records, 2004, MRCD262) Cd single
- "Downtown" in Again ... This One's For Johnny 10"/CD(Tribute To Johnny Thunders) 10" (Munster Records, 2001, MR 196)
- "Evil Hearted Ada" in Groovin' Round The World: A Tribute To The Flamin' Groovies 2xCD (Safety Pin Records, 2000, SPCD-010/11)
- "Party Dress" in La Cagarruta Sónica LP (Discos Alehop!, 1997, KAKA 001)
- "Lightning's Girl" in Tribute To Nancy Sinatra Vol. 2 7" (Munster Records, 1998, ref. 7111)
- "Calypso" [different from "Hormonal Riot" one] in Punkin' CD (Munster Records, 1997, MR 124)
- "Bad Record"/"No Square" 7" (1996, Alehop!)
