= Lourdes Iriondo =

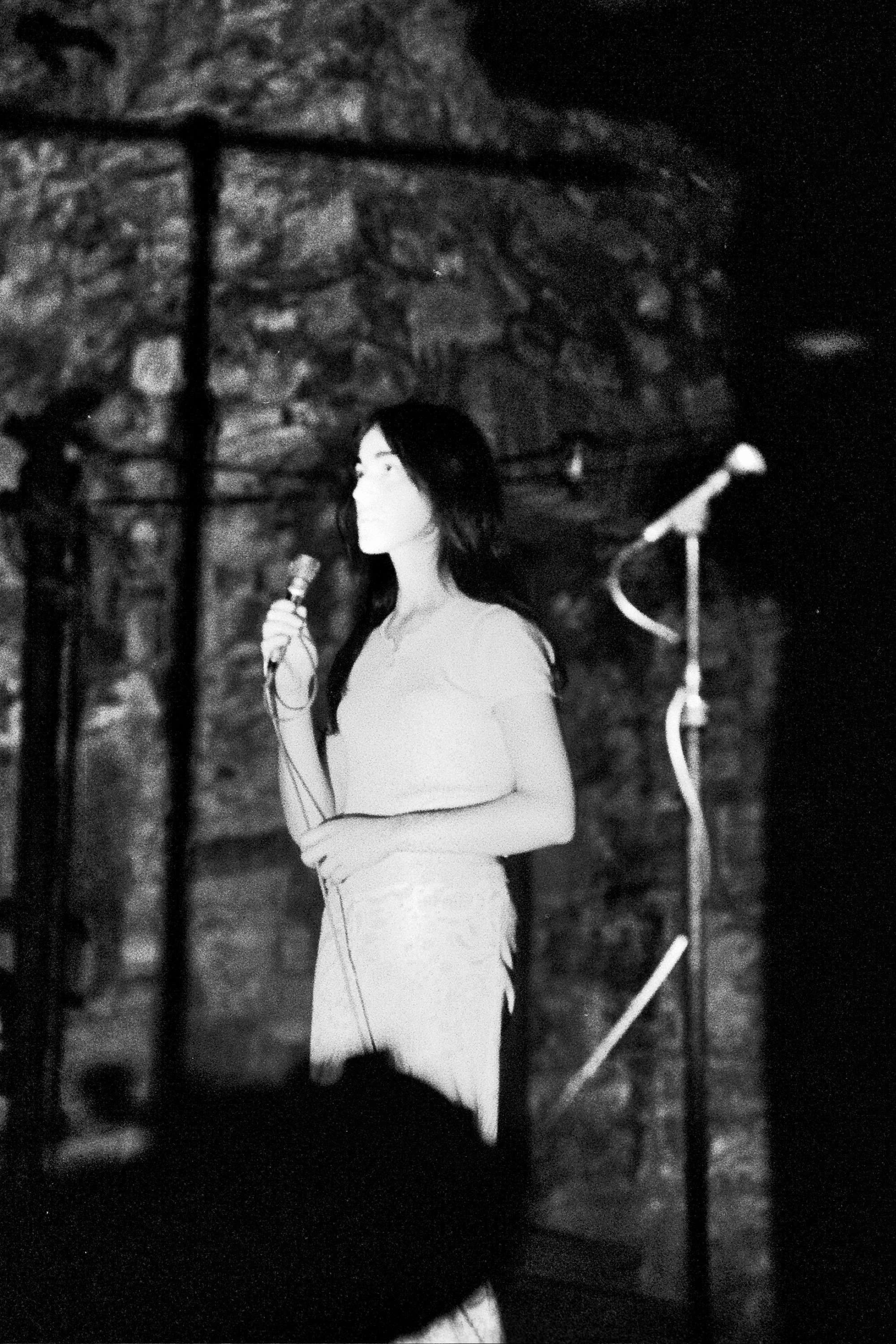

Background information
- Born: Lourdes Iriondo Mujika; 27 March 1937; San Sebastián, Spain
- Died: 2005 (aged 67–68) San Sebastián, Spain
- Occupations: Singer, writer

Lourdes Iriondo Mujika was a Basque singer and writer from Spain known for helping to revitalize the Basque Language. She was born in San Sebastián (Gipuzkoa, Basque Country, Spain) on 27 March 1937 and lived in Urnieta, Spain. She is remembered as one of the most popular members of a singing group and cultural movement that renewed Basque songwriting.

== Career ==
In 1964 Iriondo began to sing in Basque to raise funds for the ikastola, a type of school, of Andoain. The new Basque songs opened their way in a music scene dominated by English and Castilian artists. Iriondo was joined by Basque musicians such as Mikel Laboa, Josean Arza, Xabier Lete and Benito Lertxundi. They formed the group Ez Dok Amairu ("There is no 13") in 1965, which was intent on revitalizing Basque culture, which was long dormant or even forbidden under the fascist Francoist regime. The performers focused their efforts on increasing regional awareness of the Basque culture as well as increasing the social status of the Basque language. Xabier Lete was later quoted as saying the group, "did a great job of approaching the Basque folk song and bringing new songs, with new themes and melodies."

Until 1975 when Francoist Spain ended, Basque music was often banned, because of its lyrics. In spite of the restrictions, the musicians released singles and albums. Several albums were dedicated to children's stories such as Ortzadarra or Maripetralin. The group officially dissolved in 1972.

After moving on from the group, Iriondo devoted herself to the development of children's books based on national folklore, such as Martin Arotza Deabrua Jaun eta and Buruntza azpian. Her stories include "Ortzadarra" (1978) and "Lotara joateko ipuinak" (Erein, 1982) written with Andu Lertxundi and Asun Balzola. She also worked with Basque Public Television ETB.

== Personal life ==
Lourdes Iriondo married the popular Basque singer and writer Xabier Lete while both were members of the singing group Ez Dok Amairu.

She died in Donostia-San Sebastian on 27 December 2005 after a long illness, and her ashes were buried in the Urnieta (Gipuzkoa) cemetery.

In her absence, her husband began writing about their years together, as he described in a 2009 interview:

"And a year ago, suddenly, poems began to emerge about the absence of Lurdes and what I had inside, of memory, of feeling of loss, of sorrow, of guilt ... In addition, there is a reflection also must be said about the scenarios of our happiness, such as summers in Navarra, trips to Italy, stays in the Mediterranean ... They were moments of our life where, as Lurdes said, we were filled with light and images of other landscapes, moments that 'They brought us great happiness.'"

== Selected discography ==
Belter record label and others.

- "Maria Lourdes Iriondo." 1967 Belter diskoetxea.
- "Maria Lourdes Iriondo." 1967 Belter diskoetxea.
- "Lourdes Iriondo." 1968, Belter diskoetxea.
- "Kanta zaharrak." 1968, Belter diskoetxea.
- "Aur kantak." 1969, Herri Gogoa-Edigsa.
- "Lourdes Iriondo-Xabier Lete." 1969, Herri Gogoa (Donostia).
- "Lourdes Iriondo." 1969, Herri gogoa-Edigsa.
- "Lurdes Iriondo." 1974, Art and Science (Donostia).
- "Lurdes Iriondo-Xabier Lete." 1976, Edigsa.
- "Lurdes Iriondo. Anthology." 2006 Elkar.

== Selected bibliography ==
=== Literature for young ===
- Martin the carpenter and the devil Lord (Martin arotza eta Jaun deabrua. Sendagile maltzurra) 1973
- The Sickness of a Donkey (Asto baten malura) 1975
- Under the Mind (Buruntza azpian) 1975

=== Narrative ===
- Stories of the South Wind (Hego-haizearen ipuinak) 1973
- Stories to go to sleep (Lotara joateko ipuinak) 1983
