= Berri Txarrak =

Basque musical group

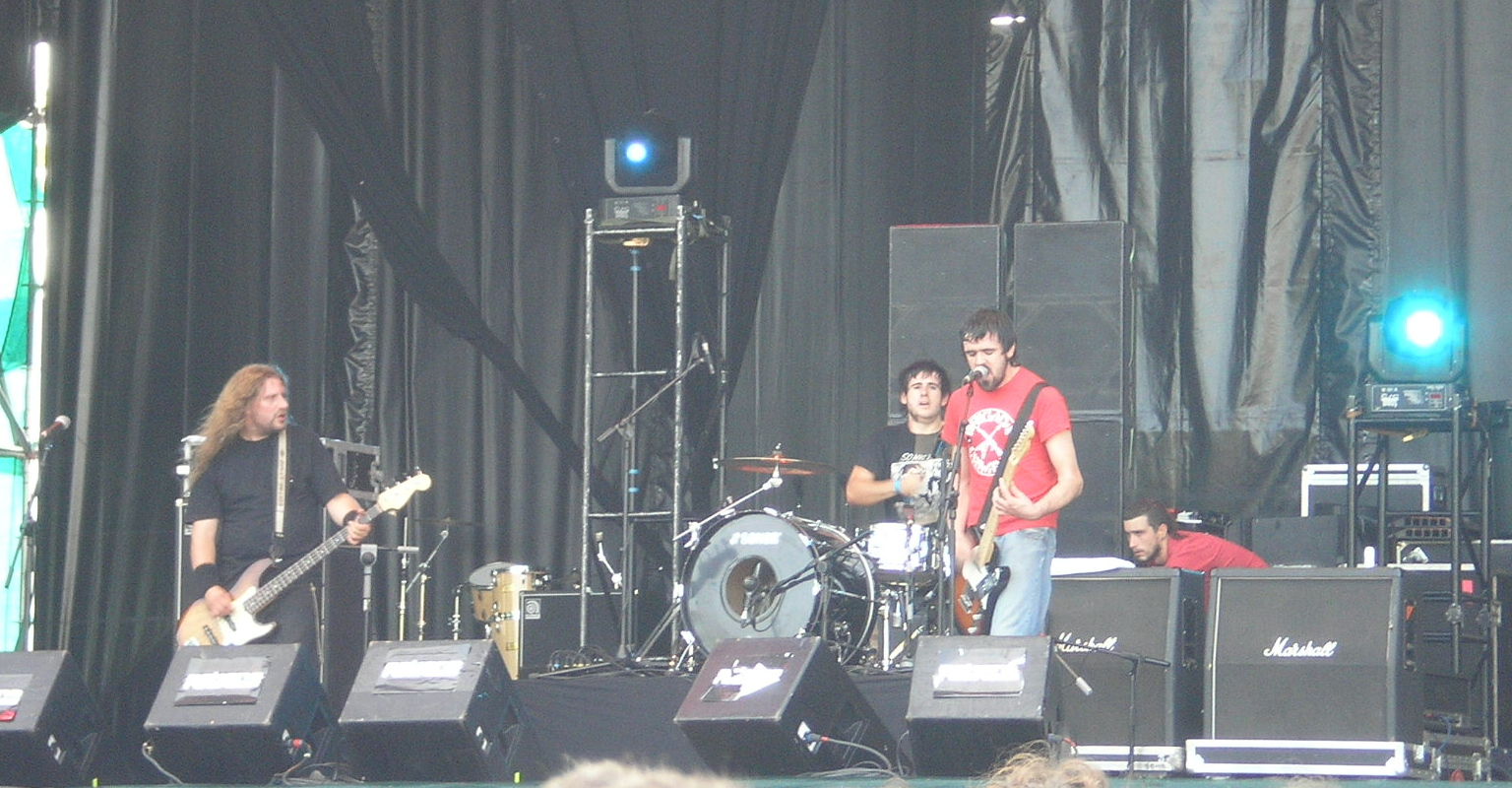
- Berri Txarrak at Azkena Rock Festival

Background information
- Origin: Navarre, Spain
- Genres: Alternative rock; alternative metal; post-grunge; post-hardcore; nu metal
- Years active: 1994–2019 (on hiatus)
- Labels: Gor Diskak, Roadrunner
- Members: Gorka Urbizu; David Gonzalez; Galder Izagirre
- Past members: Aitor Oreja; Mikel López (Rubio); Aitor Goikoetxea
- Website: berritxarrak.net

Berri Txarrak (Bad News in English) is a Navarrese rock power trio whose songs are sung in Basque. Founded as a four-member band in 1994 in Lekunberri, Navarre, they have been a three-man band since 2005. After releasing nine LPs throughout a 25-year career, they entered an indefinite hiatus in 2019.

== History ==
Berri Txarrak originated in Lekunberri, Navarre, Spain in 1994 as a parallel project of Gorka Urbizu (vocals and guitar) and Aitor Goikoetxea (drums). In 1997 they began to focus fully on the band, which soon acquired two more members: Mikel López (bass) and Aitor Oreja (guitar).

After releasing a six-track demo, the band landed several awards in different demo and new-act contests, which allowed them to record their eponymous album, released in autumn 1997. Berri Txarrak jumped to success within the Basque rock scene thanks to singles like "Lotsarik gabe", "500 urte ta gero" and "Ardifiziala". According to the band's members, that album was a step forward for their music and it became the base for their later works.

In 1999, the band released Ikasten. In this second album, Berri Txarrak's style had also evolved. Tracks such as "Ikusi arte", "Ez" or "Ikasten" allowed the band to offer a lot of live performances.

Two years later, in 2001, Eskuak/Ukabilak was released. It features acclaimed songs such as "Oihu", "Stereo" and "Biziraun", which earned them the Gaztea Saria award for best song of the year. With this album, the band gathered the attention of public and press from outside the Basque Country.

2003 was the year in which the band released their fourth album, Libre ©, to critical acclaim and earning them their first tour on Europe (UK, Denmark and Germany). Libre © is Berri Txarrak's most hardcore album. The album won the best Spanish album of the year award from the magazine Rock Sound and Euskadi Gaztea. The album includes songs such as "Denak ez du balio" (which features Rise Against's Tim McIlrath), "Hil nintzen eguna" and "Izena, izana, ezina".

After a long tour, lead guitarist Aitor Oreja left the band. In 2005, Gorka, Aitor G and Mikel decided to carry on as a three-member band and focused on what would be Berri Txarrak's fifth album, Jaio.Musika.Hil. The band went on to tour across Mexico and Nicaragua. That year, Berri Txarrak toured the US. The band supported Rise Against on their 2006 European Tour.

Berri Txarrak has worked on many music compilations like Nafarroa, Hitza Dantzan (GOR, 2001), Tributo a Judas Priest (Zero Records, 2000), the successful single "Bisai Berriak" (2002) and the Mikel Laboa tribute album Txinaurriak: Mikel Laboari ikasitako kantuak (2010) .

In 2008 bassist Mikel Rubio announced he would leave the band when their tour ended, and Bilbao-born David Gonzalez replaced him in the lineup. Later that year they announced a new album named Payola, which was released in September 2009 by Roadrunner Records, recorded by Steve Albini at the Electrical Audio Studios in Chicago and featured Tim McIlrath in one song again. A new single called Dortoken Mendean became available at their Myspace and at Roadrunner Records's official webpage on 29 June 2009.

In 2010, Aitor Goikoetxea announced he would leave the band and he was replaced by Galder Izagirre (Dut, Kuraia). In January 2011, Berri Txarrak was nominated for the 10th Annual Independent Music Awards for Best Punk Song for their song "Folklore." Also in 2011, the band released their 7th studio album, titled Haria (the Thread), recorded at Venice beach with famed producer Ross Robinson (Slipknot, Korn). The album was released in late 2011 and included a song featuring Matt Sharp (Weezer, The Rentals). The album was followed with a tour around various countries. In 2014, the band celebrated their 20th anniversary releasing a triple LP made of 20 new songs called Denbora da poligrafo bakarra (Time is the only polygraph). For that project, they chose to record each part of the triple LP with a different producer: the first with Ross Robinson again in California, the second one with Spanish Indie producer Ricky Falkner in Madrid, and the third one with Bill Stevenson in Colorado.

In 2017, Berri Txarrak released what would end up being their last LP for the foreseeable future, Infrasoinuak (Infrasounds). It was produced by Bill Stevenson in Fort Collins, CO and mixed and mastered by Jason Livermore. In 2018, lead singer Urbizu recorded guest vocals for the all Basque hardcore punk band Adrenalized in the song Gezurra ari du (It's Raining Lies).

In late 2018, Gorka Urbizu, the only remaining founding member of the band and main songwriter, announced he had decided for Berri Txarrak to enter an indefinite hiatus. A goodbye tour was announced, with the band touring extensively throughout 2019, including many concerts in the Basque Country and Spain, as well as tour legs in France, the Netherlands, Germany, the United States, Mexico and Japan, as well as Metal and Rock festivals in Spain such as Viña Rock, Download Festival, Resurrection Fest, Cruïlla BCN, Sonorama, Tsunami Xixón or Xtreme Fest. The temporary infrastructure for Bilbao BBK Live 2019 was used shortly after the festival itself to give a special concert for 20.000 people named 'Berri Txarrak lagun artean' (Berri Txarrak among friends), in which many artists of the Basque scene featured with the band. The band finally entered their indefinite hiatus after a two-night soldout in November 2019 at the Navarra Arena, Pamplona, Navarre.

== Influences ==
The band has been influenced by Nirvana, Rage Against the Machine, Su Ta Gar, Pedro the Lion, Weezer, New Order, Rise Against, and Neurosis, among others.

In songs like "Aspaldian utzitako Zelda" or "Mundua begiratzeko leihoak", they interpret poems and writings of Joseba Sarrionandia. In 2010, they made a version of the poem "Liluraren Kontra", written by the German poet Bertolt Brecht and popularized in Basque thanks to a song by Mikel Laboa.

== Members ==
- Gorka Urbizu, 1994-2019 (vocals, guitar)
- Galder Izagirre, 2010-2019 (drums)
- David Gonzalez, 2009-2019 (bass)

Former members:

- Aitor Goikoetxea, 1994-2010 (drums)
- Aitor Oreja, 1994-2004 (guitar)
- Mikel Lopez, "Rubio", 1994-2010 (bass)

== Discography ==
=== Albums ===
- Unreleased demo (1994)
- Berri Txarrak (1997, GOR Diskak)
- Ikasten (1999, GOR Diskak)
- Eskuak/Ukabilak (2001, GOR Diskak)
- Libre © (2003, GOR Diskak)
- Jaio.Musika.Hil (2005, GOR Diskak)
- Payola (2009, Roadrunner Records)
- Haria (2011, Only In Dreams, self-released)
- Denbora Da Poligrafo Bakarra (2014, Only In Dreams)
- Infrasoinuak (2017, Only In Dreams)

=== EPs ===
- Maketa (1995)

=== Compilations ===
- Denak ez du balio (SINGLES 1997-2007) (2010, GOR Diskak)

=== Live albums ===
- Zertarako Amestu (2007, GOR Diskak)
