= Haizea =

Basque folk progressive band

Haizea ('Wind') was a Basque band, playing psychedelic rock, progressive rock and folk-rock. Haizea released two albums, Haizea and Hontz Gaua. The first album Haizea was released in 1977 (IOIOTS-149 LS), being more folk than progressive. The second album, Hontz gaua (XOXOA 111 03) was released in 1979, as psychedelic folk.

The band's line up was originally Xabier Lasa (guitar and voice) (later Txomin Artola); C. Busto (drums, percussion and xilophone) (later C. Busto Hondar); Xabier Iriondo (flute and guitar); Gabriel Berrena (contrabass and electric bass); and Amaia Zubiria (vocals).

== Haizea album ==
The album Haizea contains the following tracks:

1. Brodatzen ari nintzen
2. Urzo aphal bat
3. Loa loa
4. Goizeko euri artean
5. Uxa ixuririk
6. Oreina bila
7. Arrosa xuriaren azpian

== Hontz gaua ==
The album Hontz gaua contains the following tracks:

1. Anderea
2. Egunaren Hastapena
3. Argizagi ederra
4. Arnaki
5. Hontz Gaua
