= Anari (musician) =

Basque singer

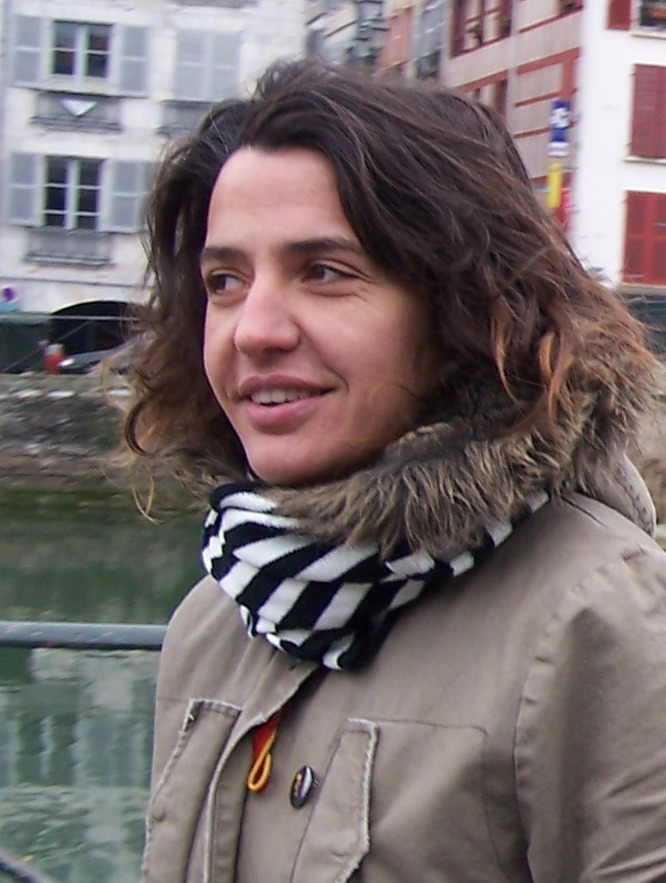
Anari (musician).

Anari (Ana Rita Alberdi) (born in 1970 in Azkoitia, Gipuzkoa) is a Basque singer-songwriter.

== Career ==
She released her first album in 1997 and has established herself as an important reference point in the Basque music scene. She has often been compared with other female singers or songwriters from English-speaking countries, such as PJ Harvey and Cat Power, due to the intricate nature of her compositions and her intense live performances.

In 2006, she started working at a secondary school in Ordizia, teaching linguistics, Hispanic literature, and philosophy.

== Discography ==
=== Albums ===
- Anari (Esan Ozenki, 1997). CD.
- Habiak (Esan Ozenki, 2000). CD.
- Anari ta Petti (Metak, 2003). CD.
- Zebra (Metak, 2005). CD.
- Anari Kafe Antzokian Zuzenean (Bidehuts, 2008). CD.
- Irla izan (Bidehuts, 2009). CD.
- Zure aurrekari penalak (Bidehuts, 2015). CD.
- Epilogo bat (Bidehuts, 2016). CD.

== Sources ==
- Interview with Anari in Rockdelux, number 237, February 2006, pp 32–33
