= Gabriel Aresti =

Basque language writer (1933–1975)

Gabriel Aresti Segurola
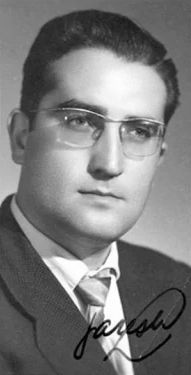
- Born: October 14, 1933; Bilbao, Biscay, Basque Country, Spain
- Died: 5 June 1975 (aged 41); Bilbao, Biscay, Basque Country, Spain
- Occupations: Poet, writer

Gabriel Aresti Segurola (October 14, 1933 – June 5, 1975) was one of the most important writers and poets in the Basque language in the 20th century.

== Life and career ==
He grew up in Bilbao, which was a Spanish-speaking environment. Although his father talked to his parents in Basque, as a child Gabriel did not have Basque as his mother-tongue. He was a self-taught student of the language, at the age of 21 he collaborated in some magazines. His literary career began with a work influenced by the symbolism, Maldan Behera (Downhill, 1960). His most important works are, however, Harri eta Herri (Stone and Country, 1964), Euskal Harria (The Basque Stone, 1968) and Harrizko Herri Hau (This Country of Stone, 1971), related to the social realism. He also cultivated other genres, like the novel, the short story and theatre. He was an excellent translator of Basque; he translated authors like Federico García Lorca, T. S. Eliot and Giovanni Boccaccio.

Video about Gabriel Aresti and Basque poetry of the 20th century. Subtitles available.

Critical and controversial, he published many articles, which brought him problems not only with Franco's regime but also with some of the mainstream Basque nationalism tendencies, because of his leftist ideas. Gabriel Aresti was one of the greatest inspirers of the modern culture in Basque language (though he always found sources in popular culture and daily talking, as opposed to the purists of the language). As a Member of the Academy of the Basque language, he defended the unified Basque language, which he also used before it was adopted by the academy in 1968. He founded the publishing house Lur, allowing new authors in the Basque language like Ramon Saizarbitoria, Arantxa Urretabizkaia or Xabier Lete to publish their first works.

== Works ==
- Nire aitaren etxea defendituko dut (poem)
- Maldan Behera ("Downhill", 1960)
- Harri eta Herri ("Stone and Country", 1964)
- Euskal Harria ("The Basque Stone", 1968)
- Harrizko Herri Hau ("This Country of Stone", 1971)
