= Lekunberri, Spain =

Municipality of Navarre, Spain

Coordinates: 43°00′12″N 1°53′38″W

Lekunberri (Basque: Lekuberri) is a municipality located in the province and autonomous community of Navarre (Navarra/Nafarroa), northern Spain. It is situated in the northwestern portion of the province, some 30 km from the provincial capital, Pamplona. Lekunberri has a population of 1,386.

Location in Navarre

== Celebrity residents ==
- All alternative rock band Berri Txarrak members come from Lekunberri.
