= Iñaki Salvador =

Spanish jazz and classical composer

Iñaki Salvador Gil (born 10 April 1962, San Sebastián) is a Basque Spanish jazz and classical pianist, arranger and composer. He is known for his Basque classic studies of piano, accordion, harmony, and counterpoint. He often collaborated with Mikel Laboa, and has performed with him in the United States. He has composed the score for several films, such as Maite (1994).
