= Orfeón Donostiarra =

- Choir
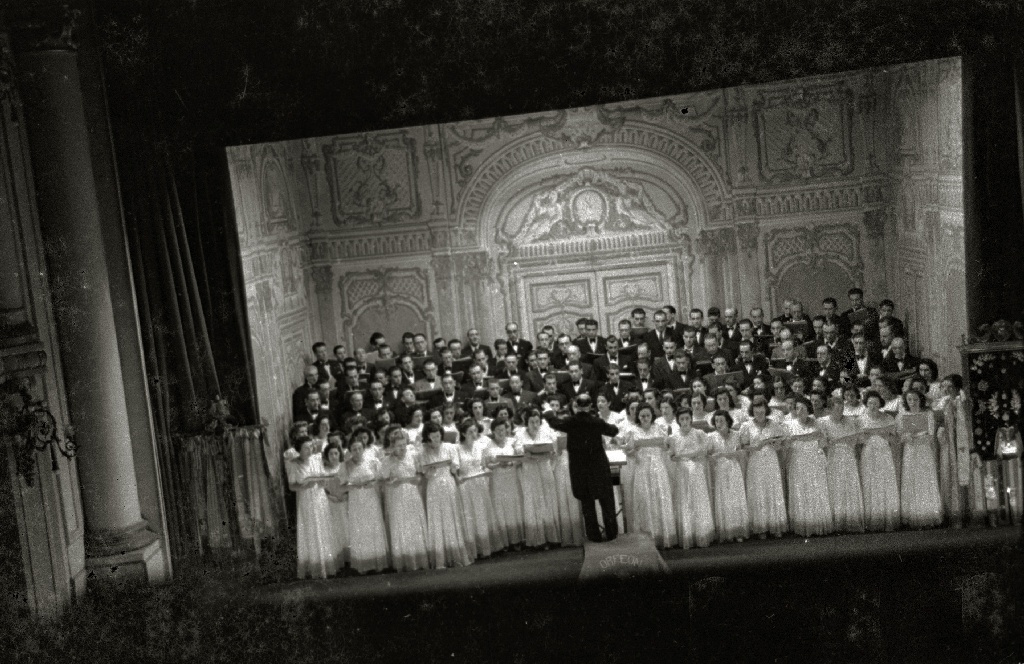
- In concert in 1941
- Founded: 1897
- Founder: Miguel Oñate
- Genre: Mixed concert choir
- Chief conductor: José Antonio Sáinz
- Headquarters: San Sebastián, Basque Country, Spain
- Website: www.orfeondonostiarra.org

The Orfeón Donostiarra is a concert choir based in San Sebastián, Basque Country, Spain.

== History ==
The choir was formed in 1897 in San Sebastián. The first music directors were Miguel Oñate, Luzuriaga and Esnaola. In June 1906 the group was awarded the Gran Prix of Paris. The next music director was Juan Gorostidi, who served until his death 1968, when Antxón Ayestarán became the next conductor. Since 1986 the choir is conducted by its present music director José Antonio Sáinz.

At the heart of the Chorus's repertoire are the most important a capella works from the 18th century to our time, as well as the great nineteenth and twentieth century large scale orchestral choral works. The choir has been invited to perform with orchestras such as the Berlin Philharmonic Orchestra, the English Chamber Orchestra, the Czech Philharmonic, the Dresden Philharmonic, the Royal Liverpool Philharmonic, the Deutsches Symphonie-Orchester Berlin, Madrid Symphony Orchestra, Israel Chamber Orchestra, Lucerne Festival Orchestra, Spanish National Orchestra, Residentie Orchestra, Bilbao Symphony Orchestra, West-Eastern Divan, London Philharmonic Orchestra, and Russian National Orchestra.

Conductors have included Claudio Abbado, Ataúlfo Argenta, Daniel Barenboim, Kurt Masur, Rafael Frühbeck de Burgos, Jesús López-Cobos, Peter Maag, Charles Mackerras, Igor Markevitch, Lorin Maazel, Zubin Mehta, Riccardo Muti, Seiji Ozawa, Esa-Pekka Salonen and Leopold Stokowski, among others.

== Recordings ==
The Orfeón Donostiarra has recorded over 120 CDs, including CDs for EMI, RTVE Música and Deutsche Grammophon.

The performance of Mahler's Second Symphony with the Lucerne Festival Orchestra and Claudio Abbado has been released on DVD and YouTube (per EuroArts).
