= Benito Lertxundi =

Basque singer-songwriter

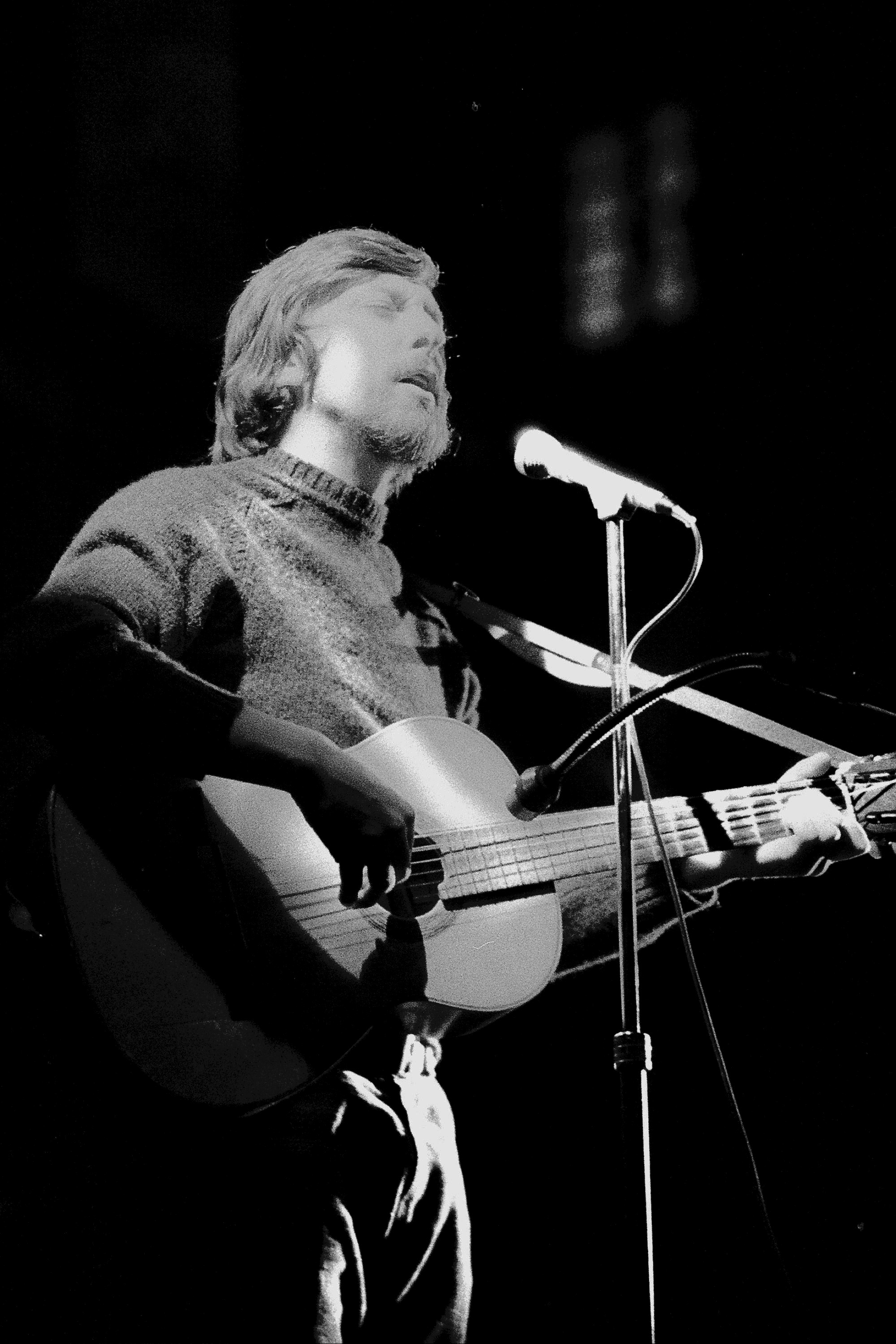
- Benito Lertxundi in 1971

Background information
- Also known as: The Bard from Orio (Orioko Bardoa)
- Born: Benito Lertxundi; 6 January 1942; Orio, Basque Country
- Genres: Basque music, classical
- Occupations: Musician, composer
- Instruments: Vocals, guitar, twelve-string guitar
- Years active: 1967–2024

Benito Lertxundi is a Basque singer-songwriter born in Orio, Gipuzkoa, Basque Country in January 6, 1942. He is an acclaimed and veteran figure in Basque music, who spearheaded with other key figures its revival in the 1960s and following years, showing a special commitment to Basque culture and matters in general. In November 2024 he announced the end of his concert career.

== Discography ==
=== Solo work ===
- Benito Lertxundi (1969)
- Ez Dok Amairu (1971)
- Oro laño mee batek... (1974)
- ..."Eta maita herria, üken dezadan plazera" (1975)
- Zuberoa / Askatasunaren semeei (1977)
- Altabizkar / Itzaltzuko bardoari (1981)
- Gaueko ele ixilen baladak (1985)
- Mauleko bidean… izatearen mugagabean (1987)
- Pazko gaierdi ondua (1989)
- Hitaz oroit (1992)
- Hunkidura kuttunak I (1992)
- Hunkidura kuttunak II (1994)
- Auhen sinfonikoa (1998)
- Nere ekialdean (2002)
- 40 urtez ikasten egonak (2005)
- Itsas ulu zolia (2008)
- Oroimenaren oraina (2012)
- Ospakizun gauean (2018)
- Gernika kontzertuan (2024)

=== With other artists ===
- Mezulari (Antonio Breschi - 1985)
- Donostia (Antonio Breschi - 1999)
- Bilbao 00:00h (Kepa Junkera - 1998)
- Lau Anaiak (2003)
- 18/98+... Auzolanean (2007)
- Zuhaitzak landatzen zituen gizona (Paul Winter Consort, 2019)
