= Berriatua =

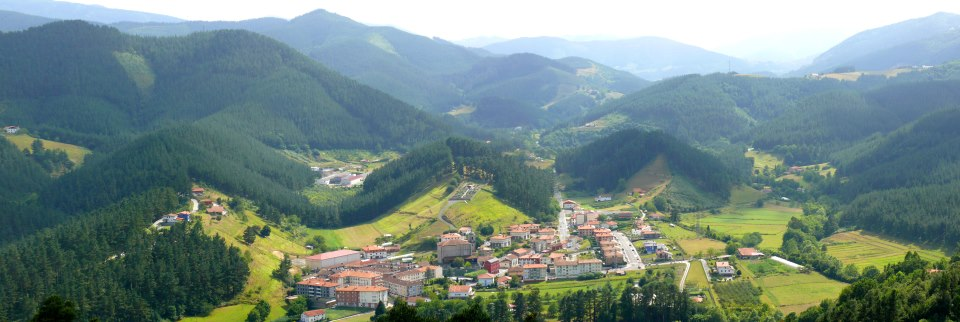
- View of Berriatua

- Flag Coat of arms

- Location of Berriatua within the Basque Country Location of Berriatua within Spain
- Coordinates: 43°18′35″N 2°28′2″W
- Country: Spain
- Autonomous community: Basque Country
- Province: Biscay
- Comarca: Lea-Artibai

Government
  - Mayor: Imanol Mugartegi Aranbarri

Area
  - Total: 20.23 km^{2} (7.81 sq mi)
- Elevation: 190 m (620 ft)

Population (2025-01-01)
  - Total: 1,224
  - Density: 60.50/km^{2} (156.7/sq mi)
- Time zone: UTC+1 (CET)
  - Summer (DST): UTC+2 (CEST)
- Postal code: 48710
- Website: www.berriatua.org

Berriatua is a town and municipality located in the province of Biscay, in the autonomous community of the Basque Country, in the north of Spain. Its neighbors are Ondarroa and the Bay of Biscay to the north, Markina-Xemein to the south, Mutriku to the east, Amoroto and Mendexa to the west. Historically Berriatua was a town of farmers with little industry. Recently the town has seen significant industrial growth as well as a great deal of construction.

== Notable people ==
- Xabi Garalde (born 1988), Spanish footballer
- Jagoba Arrasate (born 1978), Basque football coach and former player
- Conchita Bustindui (born 1927 - died 2026), Spanish pelotari
