= Xabi (given name) =

Xabi is a masculine given name. Notable people with the name include:

- Xabi Aburruzaga, Spanish-born musician
- Xabi Alonso (born 1981), Spanish football manager and former midfielder
- Xabi Auzmendi (born 1997), Spanish football midfielder
- Xabi Castillo (born 1986), Spanish football left-back
- Xabi Etxebarria (born 1987), Spanish football defender
- Xabi Garalde (born 1988), Spanish football central defender
- Xabi Huarte (born 2001), Spanish football midfielder
- Xabi Irureta (born 1986), Spanish football goalkeeper
- Xabi Pascual (born 1981), Spanish football goalkeeper
- Xabi Prieto (born 1983), Spanish football right midfielder
- Xabi Sánchez (born 1978), Spanish football manager and former midfielder
- Xabi Zurutuza (born 2006), Spanish motorcycle racer
