= Lekeitio =

Lekeitio Lekeitio Lequeitio
- Municipality
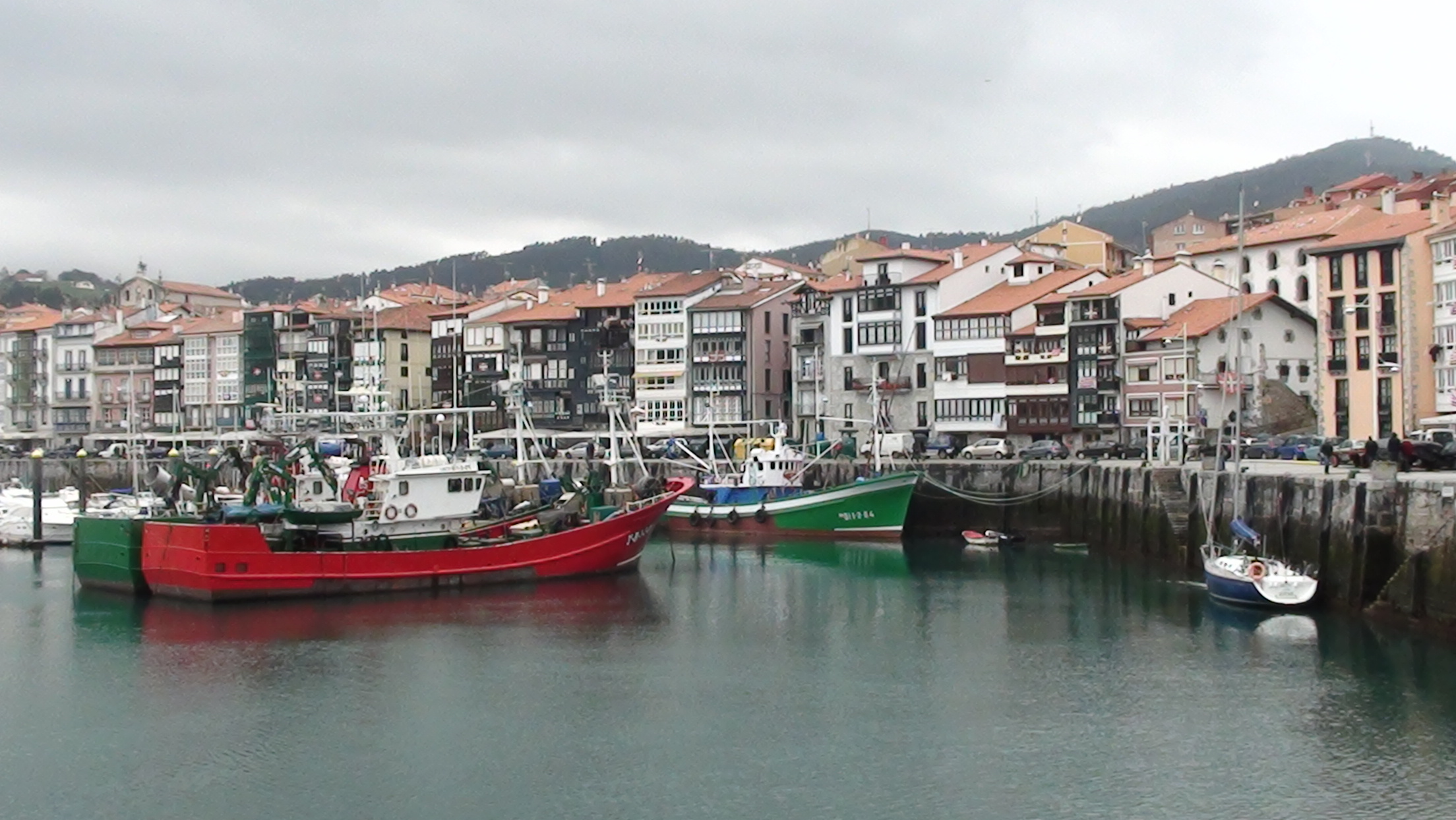

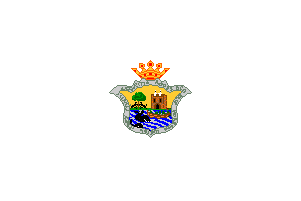
- Flag Coat of arms

- Location of Lekeitio within the Basque Country
- Coordinates: 43°21′44″N 02°29′46″W
- Country: Spain
- Autonomous community: Basque Country
- Province: Biscay
- Comarca: Lea-Artibai

Government
  - Mayor: Koldo Goitia Markuerkiaga

Area
  - Total: 1.90 km^{2} (0.73 sq mi)
- Elevation: 0 m (0 ft)

Population (2025-01-01)
  - Total: 7,211
  - Density: 3,800/km^{2} (9,830/sq mi)
- Demonym: Lekeitiarrak (Spanish: Lequeitianos)
- Time zone: UTC+1 (CET)
- Postal code: 48280
- Website: Official website

Lekeitio (Basque: [lekeiti.o]; Spanish: Lequeitio) is a town and municipality located in the province of Biscay, in the Spanish Autonomous Community of Basque Country, 53 km (33 mi) northeast from Bilbao. The municipality has 7,307 inhabitants (2019) and is one of the most important fishing ports of the Basque coast. Tourism has an important role during the summer seasons, when the town is a resort with one beach called Isuntza and the nearby Karraspio beach in the town of Mendexa.

The most important monument is the church of Santa María, a gothic basilica from the 15th century. Lekeitio is also the birthplace of Resurrección María de Azkue, one of the most important Basque scholars of the 19th century.

== Festivals ==
=== San Pedroak ===
The celebration of San Pedro takes place from 29 June, saints day, to 1 July. It begins with a mass in honor of the saint and a procession with his image. The mass is celebrated in the church of Santa Maria, and from there the procession starts to walk the streets of the town.

=== San Antolinak ===
The festivities are in honor of the patron of the town, San Antolin, and are celebrated from 1 to 8 September. One of the most popular parts of the festival is the goose pulling event.

This is held on 5 September, the aim being to hold on for as long as possible to a goose that is hanging from a rope that crosses the harbor from one dock to the other. The rope has one side fixed and on the other side there is a group of men pulling the rope to raise and lower it. In the middle of the rope there is a goose drenched in oil (in previous times the bird was alive). There are a lot of boats that take part and all of them have to go, in the order assigned through a random lottery in the morning, to the place the goose is and one participant from each boat has to grab the goose by the neck as strongly as possible. Once the boat has advanced to the front, the men at the end of the rope start pulling it, lifting the goose with the member holding it. Once the participants reach the top, the men let him drop from there, before rapidly pulling him up again. They continue like that until the participant lets the goose go or until the neck of the goose breaks. The one who makes most elevations wins the competition.

This day has been documented since the 5th century and it is said that its origins are older. This act has been celebrated since 1877.

The goose pulling event was also played on dry land, (and today is still held in Markina-Xemein). Several changes have taken place in this festival because in the past all the boats were sailed by 13 sailors. Only sailors were allowed to participate and there were strict regulations governing the speed and size of the boat, which had to be manned by 12 oarsmen and the captain. If there was any doubt about the winner they arranged a race that went to the island near Lekeitio.

The festival is controversial, especially among animal rights activists, who have called for it to be stopped. During the festival people wear denim work clothes, often combined with a white shirt.

== Cave art ==
A 15 m-long panel of etchings was discovered in the Armintxe Cave in 2016. Two of the etchings were of lions - the first seen in Basque Country. The art dates from 12,000 to 14,500 years ago.

== Notable people from Lekeitio ==
- Resurrección María de Azkue (1864–1951): Priest, writer, linguist and culture promoter. One of the creators of Euskaltzaindia and the first Euskaltzailburu, or head of Euskaltzaindia.
- Santiago Brouard (1919–1984): Doctor and politician, member of Herri Batasuna. Member of the Spanish senate and deputy mayor of Bilbao.
- Buenaventura Zapirain (1873–1937): Composer and organist.
- Eusebio Erkiaga (1912–1993): Writer.
- Miren Agur Meabe (1962): Writer.
- Josu Urrutia (1968): Former footballer and Athletic Bilbao's former president.
