= Lea-Artibai =

Coordinates: 43°17′17″N 2°31′32″W

- Eskualdea / Comarca
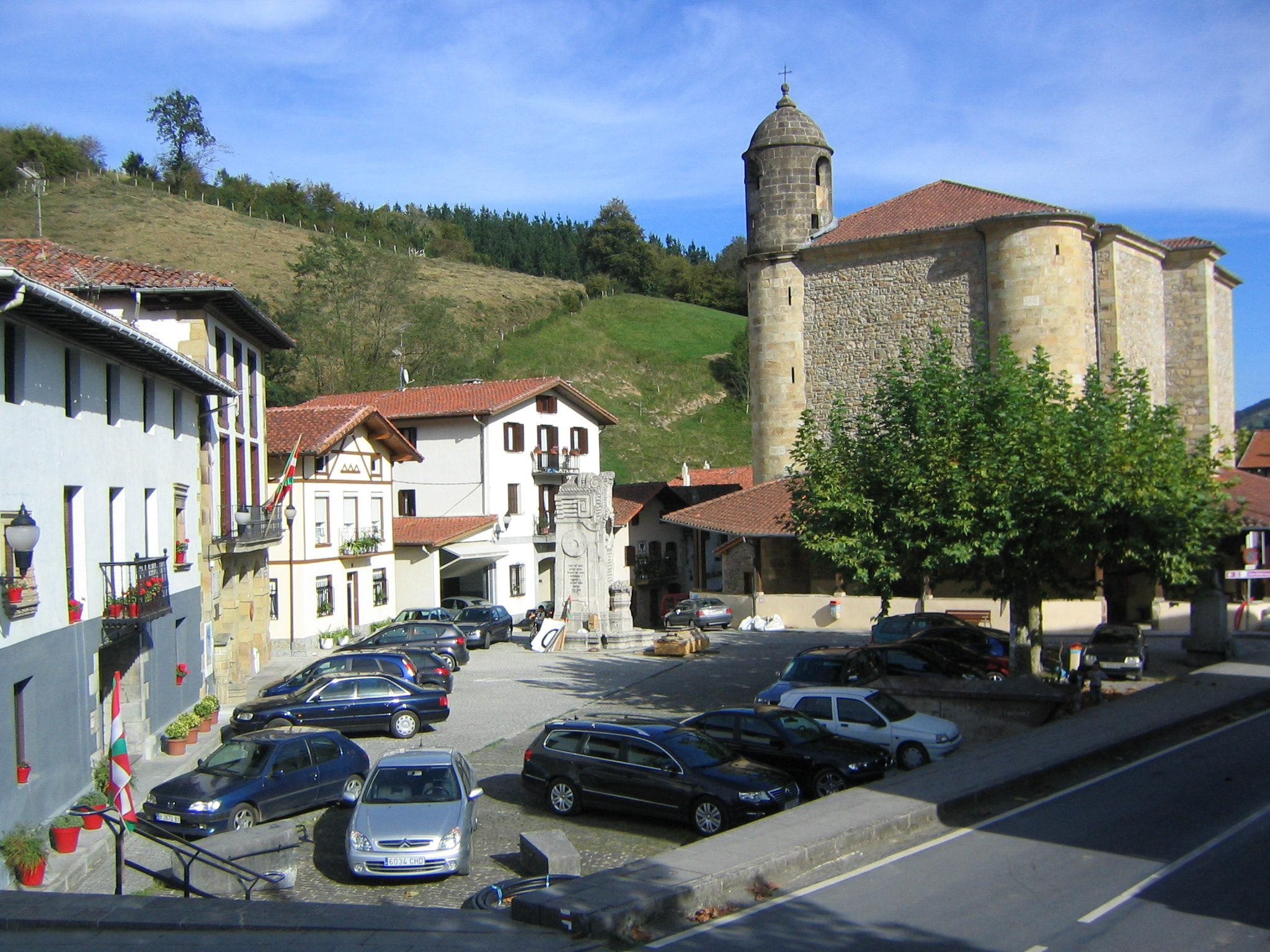
- Símon Bolivar Square in Ziortza-Bolibar

- Country: Spain
- Autonomous community: Basque Country
- Province: Biscay
- Capital: Markina-Xemein
- Municipalities: List: Amoroto, Aulesti, Berriatua, Etxebarria, Gizaburuaga, Ispaster, Lekeitio, Markina-Xemein, Mendexa, Munitibar-Arbatzegi Gerrikaitz, Ondarroa, Ziortza-Bolibar

Area
  - Total: 206 km^{2} (80 sq mi)

Population (2018)
  - Total: 25,931
  - Density: 126/km^{2} (326/sq mi)
- Demonym
- Time zone: UTC+1 (CET)
  - Summer (DST): UTC+2 (CEST)
- Largest municipality: Ondarroa

Lea-Artibai is an eskualdea/comarca of the province of Biscay (Bizkaia), in the Basque Country, Spain. Lea-Artibai is the heir of the historical merindad of Markina, which was one of the merindades of Biscay. Currently, Lea-Artibai is one of the seven comarcas that compose the province. Its capital city is Markina-Xemein.

== Geography ==
Lea-Artibai is located at the northeast extreme of the province. It limits with the comarcas of Busturialdea at west and Durangaldea at south, while the province of Gipuzkoa is at the east. The Bay of Biscay sits on the north. It occupies the drainage basin of the rivers Lea and Artibai.

== Municipalities ==
Coat of Arms	Municipality	Area in km²	Population 2001	Population 2011	Population 2018
	Markina-Xemein	44.79	4,708	4,941	4,934
	Ziortza-Bolibar +	18.50	-	411	427
	Ondarroa	3.60	9,732	8,799	8,397
	Etxebarria	18.10	798	806	772
	Berriatua	20.23	987	1,242	1,247
	Amoroto	12.94	376	413	419
	Gizaburuaga	6.32	144	204	212
	Ispaster	22.62	613	695	725
	Lekeitio	1.90	7,357	7,377	7,258
	Aulesti	25.31	649	672	648
	Munitibar-Arbatzegi Gerrikaitz	27.04	390	434	460
	Mendexa	6.90	341	437	432

Note: + created from part of Markina-Xemein in 2005.

== Transport ==
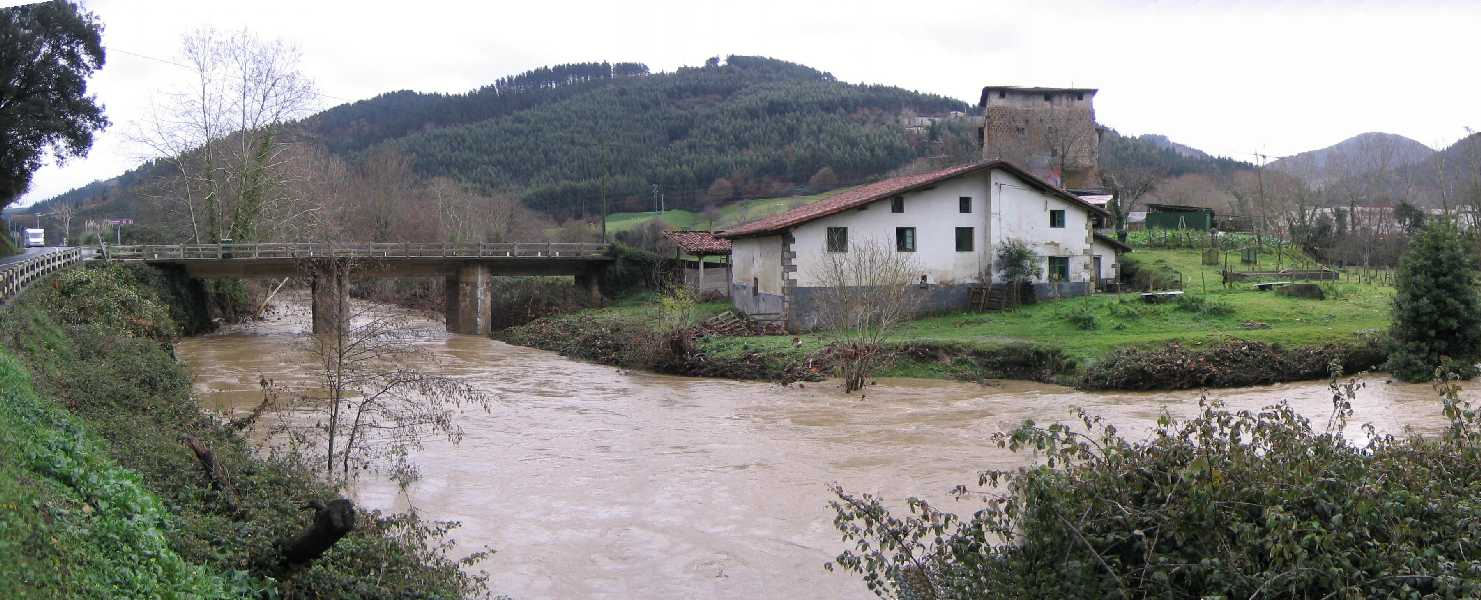
The Artibai river in Berriatua.

Lea-Artibai is the only comarca of Biscay that does not have a single kilometer of highway or railway. Its communications are deficient and depend on roads, like the BI-633 that connects Ondarroa with Durango or the BI-2405 which connects Ondarroa with Lekeitio.

== Economy ==
The economy of the municipalities of Lea-Artibai are based on the primary sector, while some industries, like one of fish preservation exist too.
