= Conchita Bustindui =

Spanish pelotari (1927–2026)

- Bustindui in 2024

Personal information
- Born: Conchita Bustindui Garate; 2 December 1927 Berriatua, Biscay, Spain
- Died: 25 February 2026 (aged 98) Markina-Xemein, Spain
- Spouse: Fermin Mugerza

Sport
- Country: Basque Country; Spain
- Sport: Basque pelota

Conchita Bustindui Garate (2 December 1927 – 25 February 2026) was a Spanish pelotari. She was known for playing professional basque pelota in Spain and Mexico. Mundo Deportivo described Bustindui and her teammates as "the first professional athletes in the world in the women's field".

Bustindui died in Markina-Xemein on 25 February 2026, at the age of 98.
