= Pradera (surname) =

Pradera is a Spanish surname meaning "meadow". Notable people with the surname include:

- Javier Pradera (1934–2011), Spanish activist and journalist
- Mikel Pradera (born 1975), Spanish cyclist
- Nicolasa Pradera (1870–1959), Spanish chef, restaurateur and cookbook writer
- Víctor Pradera Larumbe (1872–1936), Spanish political theorist and politician
