= Kirmen Uribe =

Spanish writer (born 1970)

- Born: October 5, 1970 (age 56); Ondarroa, Basque Country, Spain
- Education: University of the Basque Country; University of Trento
- Occupations: Writer, professor at New York University
- Spouse: Nerea Arrieta (2007)
- Children: 3
- Writing career
- Genres: hybrid novel; non-fiction novel
- Subjects: Memory; Exile; Migration; Feminism; Pacifism
- Notable work: Bilbao-New York-Bilbao
- Notable awards: National Literature Prize for Narrative (2009); International Writing Program (2017); New York Public Library Cullman Center Fellow (2018-2019)
- Website: kirmenuribe.eus/en

Signature
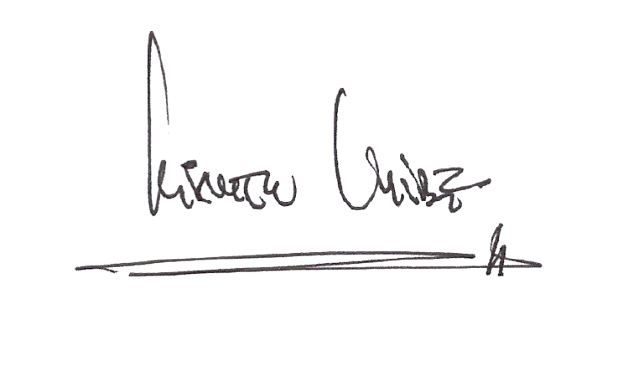

Kirmen Uribe (pronounced [ˈkiɾmen uˈɾibe]; born October 5, 1970) is a Basque-born New York-based author.

His debut novel, Bilbao–New York–Bilbao (Coffee House Press, 2022), won the National Prize for Literature in Spain, and his work has been translated into over twenty languages. Uribe's poetry has appeared in journals including The New Yorker and The Paris Review.

In 2018, he received the New York Public Library Cullman Center Writing Fellowship. He lives in New York City, where he teaches creative nonfiction in the MFA program in Creative Writing in Spanish at New York University (NYU).

== Early life ==
Kirmen Uribe was born in Ondarroa, a fishing town about one hour from Bilbao. Uribe's father (who died in 1999) was a trawlerman and his mother was a homemaker. He studied Basque Philology at the University of the Basque Country–Gasteiz, and completed graduate studies in Comparative Literature and Literary Theory in Trento, Italy. He won his first literary prize in 1995 while in jail for being a conscientious objector and refusing compulsory military service.

== 1. College Years ==
=== Early Poetry and Multimedia Beginnings ===
During college, he became deeply involved in the cultural and literary life of Vitoria-Gasteiz, where he was active in several social movements. Around that time, he met singer-songwriter Mikel Urdangarin, with whom he created several multimedia projects that combined poetry, music, and visual art, including Bar Puerto.

=== Bar Puerto ===
In 2000, when his grandmother’s house was demolished to make way for a new road, Uribe filmed the neighborhood’s residents, weaving together oral history, traditional harbor songs, and poetry, with the collaboration of filmmaker Josu Eizagirre Olea. The result was Bar Puerto, an on-stage documentary and reading that blended archival material, oral memory, and performance.

=== Meanwhile Take My Hand ===
Meanwhile Take My Hand (Graywolf, 2007), was written while Uribe was in a period of mourning the death of his father. The collection, translated by Elizabeth Macklin, was a finalist for the 2008 PEN Award for Poetry in Translation.

== 2. Trilogy of Passage ==
In 2005, Uribe returned to his hometown of Ondarroa, where he wrote three novels — Bilbao–New York–Bilbao, Mussche, and The Hour of Waking up Together. These works gave voice to silenced stories through unconventional narrative forms, moving from autofiction to documentary-style novels featuring real characters. Together, they have been referred to as Trilogy of Passage, as they explore the experiences of characters in displacement.

=== Bilbao-New York-Bilbao ===
In 2008 Uribe published his first novel, Bilbao–New York–Bilbao (Coffee House Press, 2022 edition, trans. Elizabeth Macklin). The novel won the National Prize for Literature in Spain. It is set on a flight from Bilbao Airport to New York's J.F.K. during which the narrator, Kirmen Uribe, reflects on a novel-in-progress about three generations of his seafaring family.

The novel has no conventional plot. Its structure is that of a net, its “knots” formed by stories of the three generations, intersecting with digressions and reflections on the twentieth century as experienced in the Basque Country. It incorporates poems, letters, emails, and prose fragments into a hybrid narrative.

Ollie Brock wrote about the novel in The Times Literary Supplement in August 2011: "Uribe has succeeded in realizing what is surely an ambition for many writers: a book that combines family, romances and literature, anchored deeply in a spoken culture but also in bookishness —and all without a single note of self-congratulation".

The novel was selected by El País as one of the 100 best Spanish books of the Century.

=== Mussche ===
In his second novel, Mussche (2013), Uribe recounts to a recently deceased close friend the story of Belgian poet and translator Robert Mussche, who in 1937 took in a Basque girl displaced by the Spanish Civil War at his home in Ghent.

"A thrilling novel from the first line to the last. The vicissitudes of the young Belgian writer related to Basque war children is a narrative tense, exemplary in its structure and that oozes authenticity" reviewed César Coca (El Correo).

Mussche has been recognized as a significant anti-war novel.

=== The Hour of Waking up Together ===
His third novel, The Hour of Waking Up Together (2016), continues his exploration of forgotten lives to make fiction. This documentary novel follows the life of Karmele Urresti, a Basque nurse exiled to Paris in 1937, where she joins the Basque Cultural Embassy and meets the jazz trumpeter Txomin Letamendi. After the German occupation, they flee to Venezuela. There, both join the Office of Strategic Services OSS to fight fascism and investigate Nazi networks, a mission that sends them back to Europe during World War II. Letamendi’s later killing in Spain remained uninvestigated, obscured by Francoist structures of impunity, and the novel seeks to illuminate this unresolved act of political violence.

JA Masoliver Ródenas wrote in La Vanguardia: «The direct and precise prose of Kirmen Uribe doesn't have to fool us: it's the fruit of accuracy, not simplicity. His background is that of a cosmopolitan and sophisticated writer. (…) A writer of great and real talent.»

With this novel, Uribe closed his trilogy, a narrative cycle that gives Basque history a universal dimension.

=== The Alphabet of the Bilbao Museum ===
In 2018, before relocating to New York, Uribe collaborated with the Bilbao Fine Arts Museum on The Alphabet of the Bilbao Museum (ABC. Bilboko Museoaren alfabetoa), an exhibition celebrating the institution’s 110th anniversary.

== 3. American Years ==
In the same year, after participating in the International Writing Program at the University of Iowa, Uribe settled in New York City. He was awarded the Cullman Center Fellowship at the New York Public Library, where he began writing his novel Life Before Dolphins.

=== Saturraran ===
During these years, he frequently traveled between Europe and the United States and wrote the opera libretto Saturraran (music by Juan Carlos Pérez), premiered in June 2024 at the Teatro Arriaga in Bilbao. Inspired by W. H. Auden’s Elegy for Young Lovers and a local legend, it tells the story of two women whose love is condemned by society. Set in the 1980s, against the backdrop of heroin addiction, AIDS, and the decline of the fishing industry, Saturraran has been described as "a lyrical tribute to a lost generation and its struggle for freedom".

=== Life Before Dolphins ===
Life Before Dolphins (Coffee House Press, forthcoming 2027; trans. Megan McDowell) is a lyrical fusion of memoir, historical narrative, and philosophical reflection that explores transformation, exile, and love. The novel is anchored in the forgotten legacy of Rosika Schwimmer—a pioneering suffragist, pacifist, and diplomat denied U.S. citizenship for refusing to bear arms. Interwoven with her story is the narrator’s own journey from the Basque Country to New York City, mirroring Schwimmer’s struggle for conscience and belonging.

Told through multiple perspectives and experimental forms — an unfinished novel, a pandemic era letter, and a TikTok video — Life Before Dolphins continues Uribe’s exploration of the novel as a “living system” or “self-regenerating narrative.” It merges the formal experimentation of Modernism (James Joyce, Virginia Woolf, W.G. Sebald) with the interconnected vision of 21st-century systems thinking, including ecology, networks, neuroscience, and interdependence.

=== Recent Recognition ===
In 2025, one of Uribe’s poems was included in The New Yorker’s centennial poetry anthology. That same year, Basque filmmaker Asier Altuna Iza premiered the feature film Karmele at the San Sebastián International Film Festival, based on The Hour of Waking Together.

== Works ==
=== Novels ===
- Bilbao-New York-Bilbao (2008) Elkar, 2008. Translated into Spanish (Seix Barral, 2009), French (Gallimard, 2011), English (Seren Books, 2012 / Coffee House Press, 2022), Japanese (Hakusui Sha, 2012), and into more than ten other languages including Italian, Russian, Portuguese, Serbian, Bulgarian, Estonian, Albanian, Slovenian, Catalan, Galician, Georgian, and Amharic.
- Mussche. Susa, 2012. Translated into Spanish (Seix Barral, 2013), Japanese (Hakusui Sha, 2014), Chinese (Lijiang, 2014), Catalan (Edicions 62, 2015), Galician (Xerais, 2015), and Dutch (De Blauwe Tijger, 2016).
- The Hour of Waking Up Together (Elkarrekin esnatzeko ordua). Susa, 2016. Translated into Spanish (Seix Barral, 2017), French (Le Castor Astral, 2018), Catalan (Edicions 62, 2018), Portuguese (Elsinore, 2019), Galician (Xerais, 2019), Serbian (Areté, 2019), and Greek (Kastaniotis, 2019).
- Life Before Dolphins (Izurdeen aurreko bizitza). Susa, 2021.Translated into Spanish (Seix Barral, 2023), Catalan (Edicions 62, 2023), German (Berlin Verlag, 2024), Albanian (Aleph, 2025), Hungarian (Europa Publishing, 2026), and English (Coffee House Press, 2027).

=== Poetry ===
- Meanwhile Take My Hand (Bitartean heldu eskutik). Susa, 2001. Translated into English by Elizabeth Macklin (Graywolf, 2005). Translated into Spanish (Visor, 2006), French (Le Castor Astral, 2007), Catalan (Proa, 2008), Russian (Guernica Press, 2009), and Georgian (Ilia University Press, 2010).

=== Essays ===
- ABC. The Alphabet of the Museum (ABC. Bilboko museoaren alfabetoa). Bilbao Fine Arts Museum, 2018. Exhibition curated by Kirmen Uribe, reorganizing the museum's permanent collection alphabetically, blending authors, styles, and eras. Published in Basque, Spanish, French, and English.

=== Selected Anthology Contributions ===
- A Century of Poetry in The New Yorker, edited by Kevin Young. Knopf, 2025.
- New European Poets, Graywolf Press, 2008.
- Contributor to Ghost Fishing: An Eco-Justice Poetry Anthology (2018, University of Georgia Press)

=== Opera and Dramatic Works ===
- Saturraran – Opera libretto. Premiere: 2024, Teatro Arriaga, Bilbao.
- Blood Wedding, Sleepers Awake! – Broadway musical, co-written with Jessica Swan. Premiere: 2027.

=== Awards and Honors ===
- Spanish Critics Award (Poetry in Basque) 2002 for Meanwhile take my hand.
- Spanish National Book Award (Narrative) 2009 for his novel Bilbao-New York-Bilbao.
- Spanish Critics Award (Narrative in Basque) 2009 for his novel Bilbao-New York-Bilbao.
- "El Correo-Vocento" 2010 Journalism Award for the best article in the Spanish Press.
- Spanish Critics Award (Narrative in Basque) 2017 for his novel The Hour of Waking up together.
- International Writing Program, Iowa. 2017.
- New York Public Library Cullman Center Writing Fellowship, 2018-2019.
- Weiss International Writing Fellow. Barnard College. Columbia University. 2019-2020.
- Spanish Critics Award (Narrative in Basque) 2022 for his novel Life Before Dolphins.
- Eusko Ikaskuntza - Laboral Kutxa Prize of Humanities, Culture, Arts and Social Sciences, 2023.
- Sundial House Press Board of Editors Member. Columbia University. 2023-.
- Santa Maddalena Fellowship. Florence, Italy. 2024.

== Literature ==
- Jon Kortazar, Contemporary basque literature: Kirmen Uribe's proposal, Iberoamericana Editorial Vervuert, S.L. [2013], ISBN 978-8484897255
- María José Olaziregi Alustiza/Amaia Elizalde Estenaga (eds.): Kirmen Uribe: escritura y vida, Berlin; Bern; Wien : Peter Lang, [2021], ISBN 978-3-631-84503-5
- María José Olaziregi Alustiza/Amaia Elizalde Estenaga (eds.) Kirmen Uribe: Life and Fiction (Basque Literature Series), Reno: Center for Basque Studies Press, [2022], ISBN 978-1949805710
