= Ziortza-Bolibar =

- Municipality
- Ziortza-Bolibar
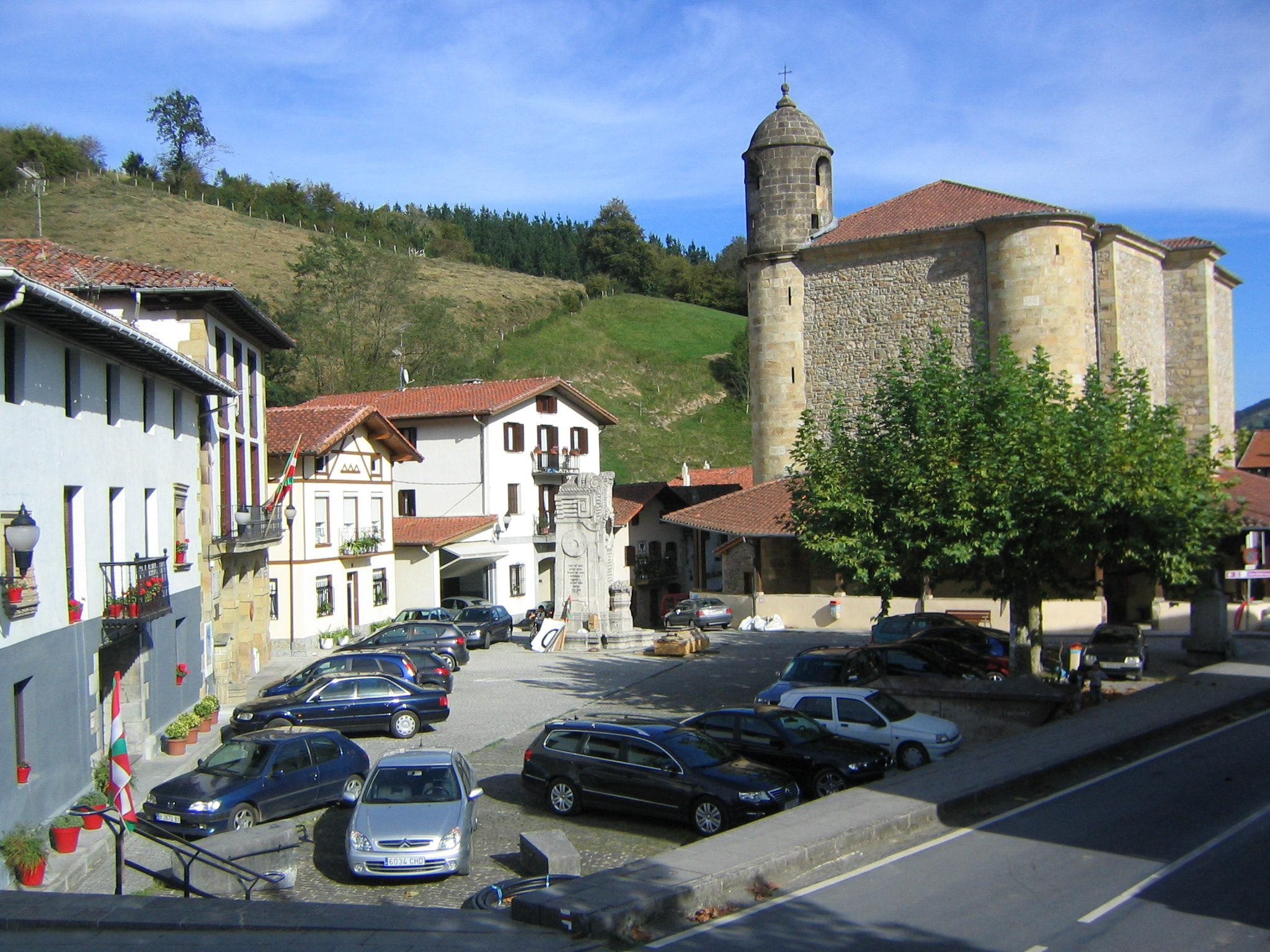

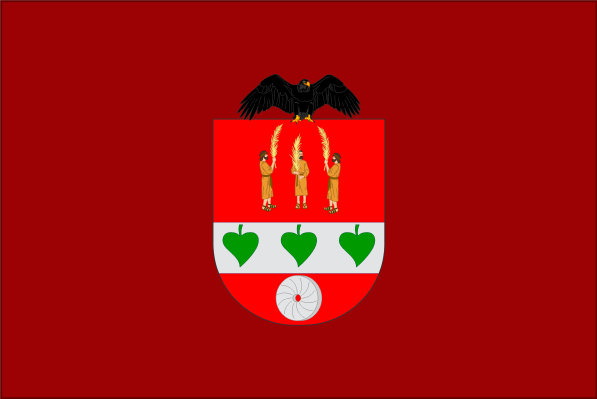
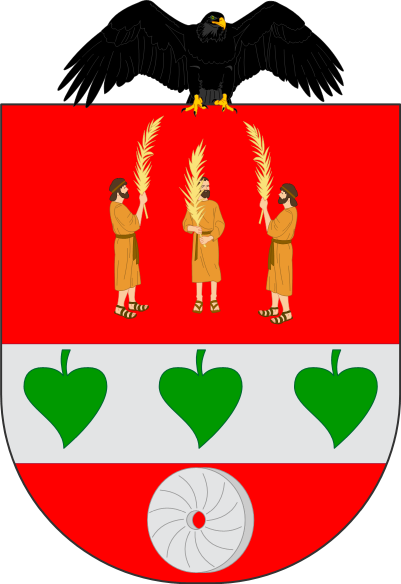
- Flag Coat of arms

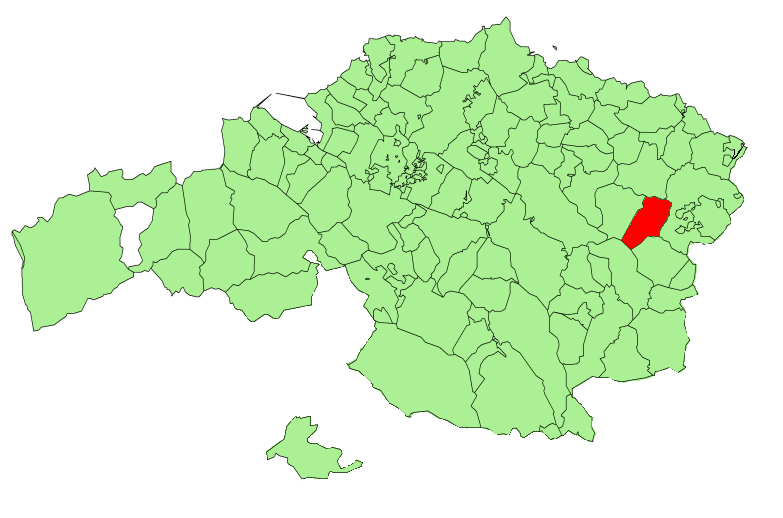
- Location of Ziortza-Bolibar in Spain and Biscay

- Location in Spain
- Coordinates: 43°14′42″N 2°33′21″W
- Country: Spain
- Autonomous community: País Vasco
- Province: Biscay
- Comarca: Lea-Artibai
- Founded: 2005

Government
  - Alcalde: José Salvador Azpiazu Totorikaguena (2007) (EAJ-PNV)

Area
  - Total: 18.50 km^{2} (7.14 sq mi)
- Elevation: 162 m (531 ft)

Population (2025-01-01)
  - Total: 401
  - Density: 21.7/km^{2} (56.1/sq mi)
- Demonym: Ziortzarra Bolibartarra
- Time zone: UTC+1 (CET)
  - Summer (DST): UTC+2 (CEST)
- Postal code: 48278
- Website: Official website

Ziortza-Bolibar (Spanish: Cenarruza-Puebla de Bolívar) is a municipality in the province of Biscay, Basque Country (Spain), in the comarca of Lea-Artibai. It has 383 inhabitants according to the 2006 census, and has an area of 18.94 km^{2}.

The municipality was annexed in 1969 by Markina-Xemein and recovered its independence on January 1, 2005. Records indicate its existence since the 11th century.

== Etymology ==
The name Bolibar comes from the Basque language. An etymology meaning "mill valley" (bolu = "mill" and ibar = "valley") has been proposed.

Ziortza/Cenarruza is derived from a local name for polygonum ziaurri (historically *zinaurri) and the suffix -tza denoting a place of abundance of something.

== Puebla de Bolívar ==
Bolívar or Bolibar (in Basque) is the urban centre of the municipality, situated along the stream with the same name, at the foot of Mount Oiz.

From 1969 to 2004 it belonged, along with the neighbourhood of Cenarruza (Ziortza in Basque), to the municipality of Markina-Xemein, until a community movement managed to merge both neighbourhoods into an independent municipality.

The last name Bolívar has its origins in this locality; Simón Bolívar de la Rementería, a colonist born in this neighbourhood, took it from Europe to the America, where his famous descendant Simón Bolívar, one of the Libertadores of America, made it famous around the world. There are a couple of statues and a museum in his honour; there was a family house in Rementería, behind the local church, but it does not exist anymore.

Other illustrious people from this small village are: Diego de Irusta, who participated in the Battle of Las Navas de Tolosa; the abbots of the Collegiate church of Cenarruza; Diego and Bernardino de Irusta; general Francisco de Longa, hero of the Spanish Independence War; and general Pedro de Zubiaur.

== Collegiate Church of Cenarruza ==
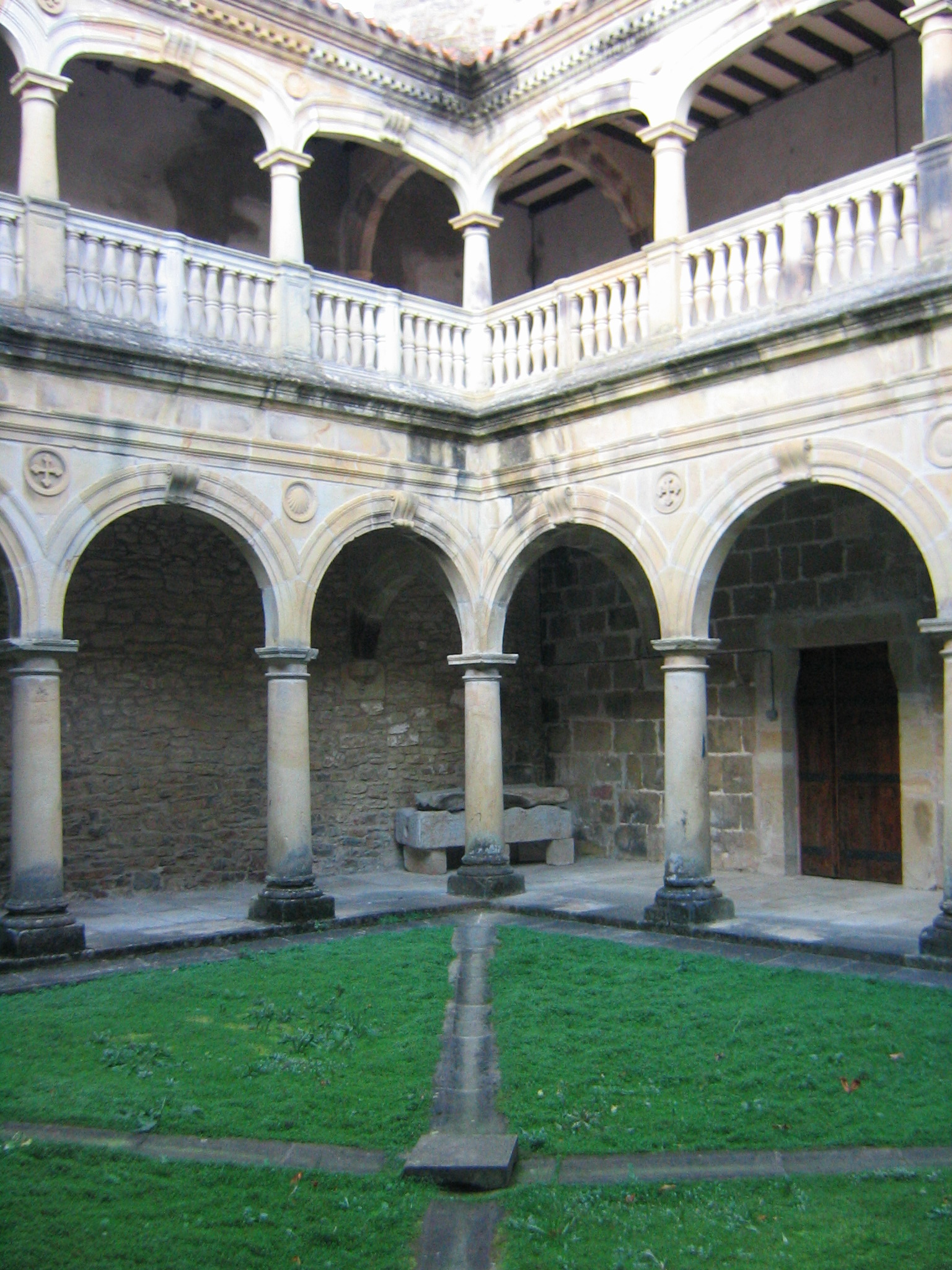
Cloister of the Collegiate Church of Santa María de Cenarruza

The Collegiate Church of Cenarruza or Ziortza is located roughly two kilometers from the urban nucleus. It was an important enclave in the Route of Santiago de Compostela, and its influence extended beyond the comarca and surpassed the religious scope.

Tradition marks its founding in the 10th century. According to legend, on the day of the Assumption in the year 968 the local inhabitants held a mass in the Church of Santa Lucia de Garay, when an eagle picked up a skull from an opened tomb and dropped it in the place where the Collegiate Church is situated today. The people understood this event to be a sign and raised the religious complex in that place.

The complex consists of:

- The church, originally built in the 14th century but continually rebuilt until it obtained, in the 15th century, the Gothic style it currently has. In its interior there is a magnificent organ, one of the most ancient in Biscay, and a large group of sculptures. The portico has curious carvings in its beams, and the front door has a group of sculptures representing Jesus Christ and two musician angels.
- The cloister, built in the Renaissance period. It has a square floor-plan, and the spandrels are decorated with shells and Fleur-de-lis crosses.
- The Eastern Gate is the main entrance to the religious complex. It bears the coat-of-arms of the Múgica and Butrón families, as well as an image of the legendary eagle holding the skull in its claws.

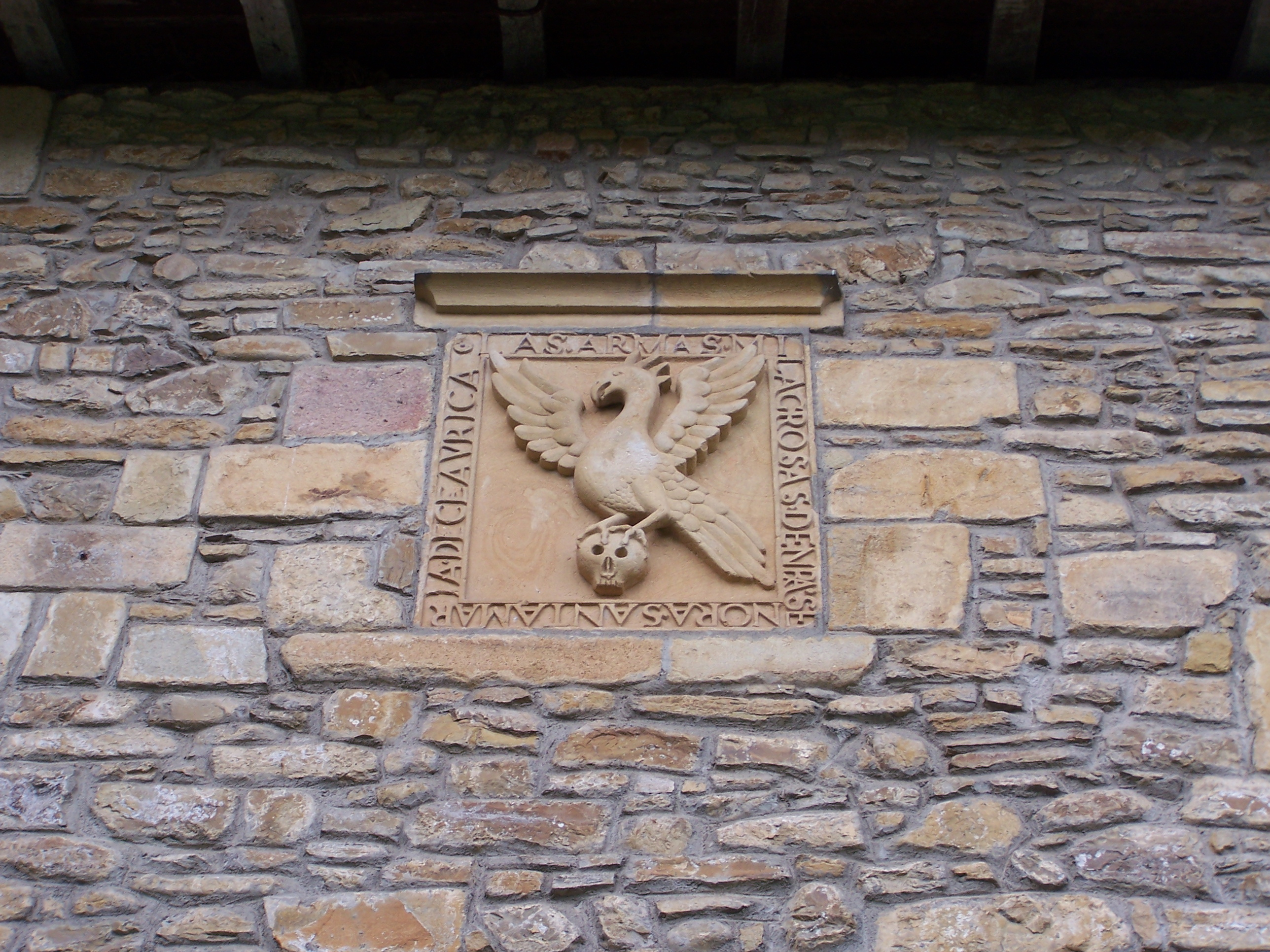
Eagle with a skull in its claws

- The Western Gate, smaller than the Eastern one but bearing the same coat-of-arms and the same image of the eagle.

There was a hospital for pilgrims that was destroyed in a fire and was subsequently rebuilt as a hostel managed by Cistercian monks and is the property of the monastery of Oliva in Navarra. There are remains of a walkway which formed part of the Santiago Route.

== Other monuments in Bolívar ==
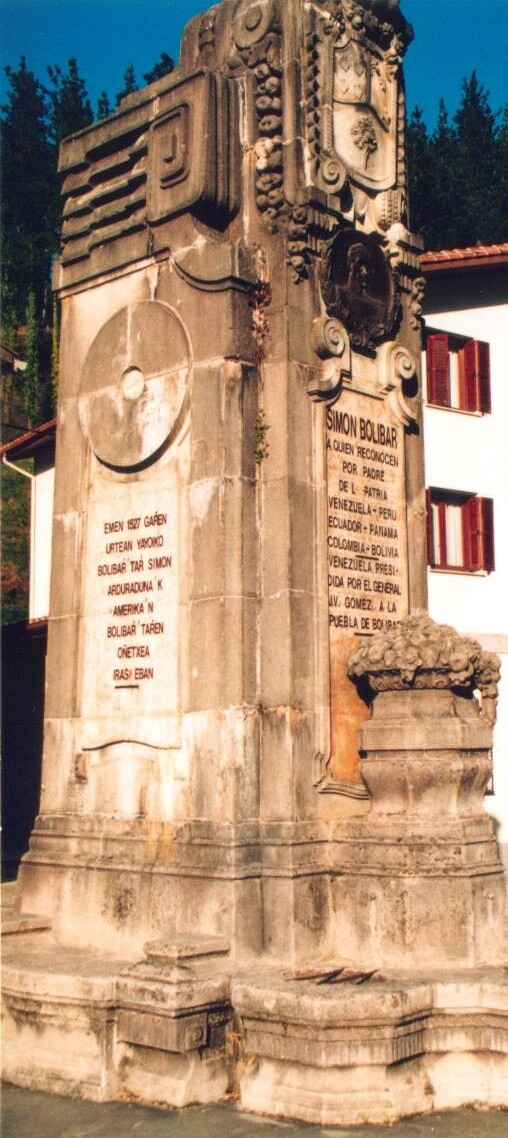
Monument to Simón Bolívar

- Church of Saint Thomas, built in the 10th century and rebuilt in the 17th and 18th centuries. It has the structure of a fortress-temple, with only one nave and a rib vault, as well as two cylindrical towers. The altarpiece is neoclassical.
- The government of Venezuela erected a monument in honour of the "Liberator" (Simón Bolívar) in 1927, the first one in Spain.
