= Aulesti =

- Municipality
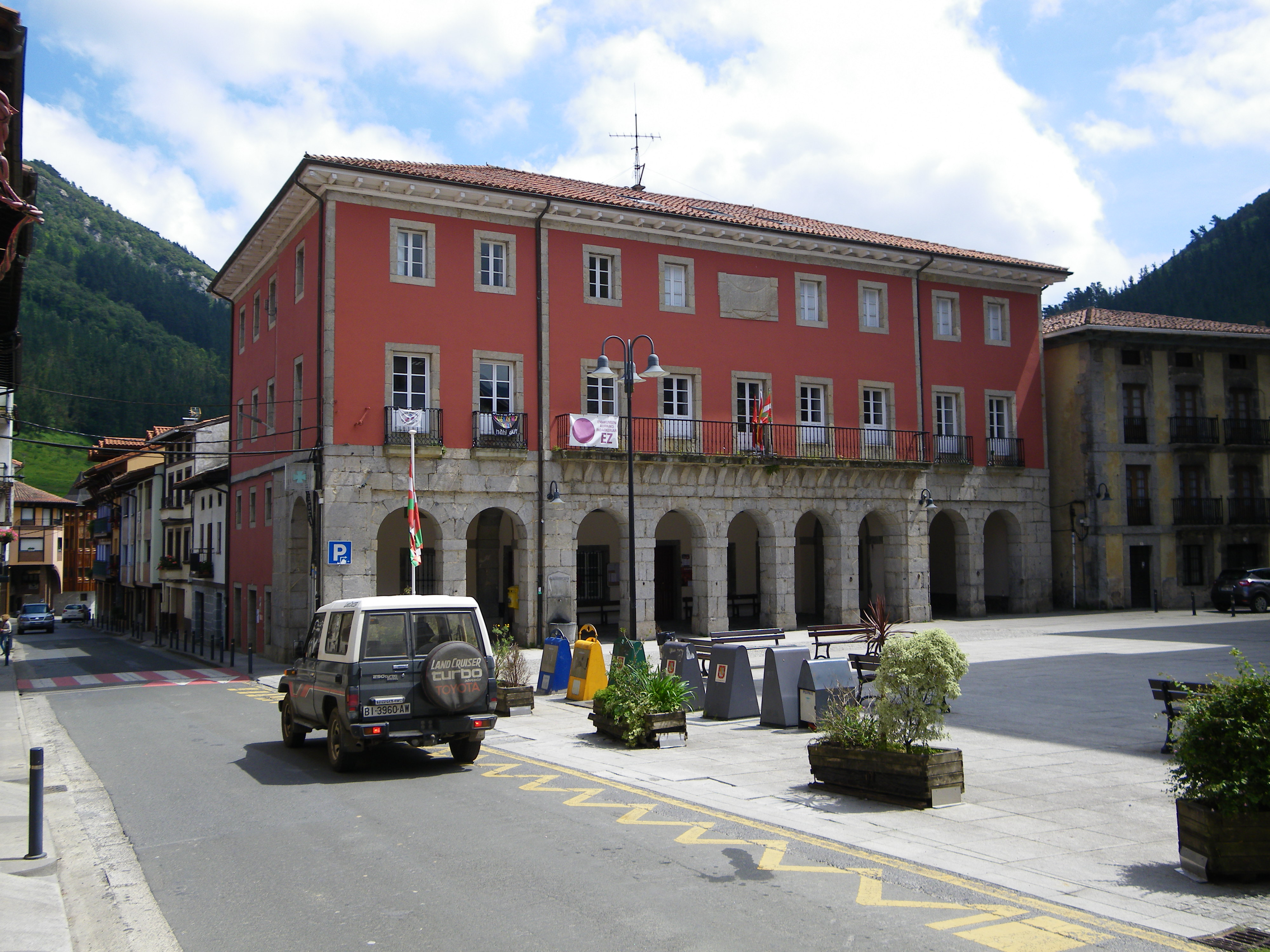
- Aulesti town hall

- Coat of arms

- Location of Aulesti within the Basque Country
- Coordinates: 43°17′47″N 2°33′46″W
- Country: Spain
- Autonomous community: Basque Country
- Province: Biscay
- Comarca: Lea-Artibai

Government
  - Mayor: Mikel Ansotegui Jayo (EH Bildu)

Area
  - Total: 25.31 km^{2} (9.77 sq mi)
- Elevation: 85 m (279 ft)

Population (2025-01-01)
  - Total: 639
  - Density: 25.2/km^{2} (65.4/sq mi)
- Demonym: Basque: aulestiarra
- Time zone: UTC+1 (CET)
  - Summer (DST): UTC+2 (CEST)
- Postal code: 48380
- Official language(s): Basque; Spanish
- Website: Official website

Aulesti is a town and municipality located in the province of Biscay, in the autonomous community of the Basque Country in northern Spain. Aulesti is located in the region of Lea-Artibai, 44 kilometres (27 mi) from Bilbao, the capital of Biscay.

== Chapels ==
Nine small chapels are located in Aulesti and its surrounding mountains. These chapels date back to the time of the Roman Empire and were rebuilt in the 19th century.

== Mountains ==
The mountains around Aulesti contain a characteristic black marble known as Nero Marquino Marble, which is quarried and shipped worldwide for use as a construction material.

== Traditional events ==
Aulesti is known for several traditional gatherings. One strength-related competition involves farm animals transporting heavy loads of stones. It hosts strength competitions for humans as well. The origin of these traditional events can be traced to the daily work of the Basque farmers.

On September 16 of every year, the town council organizes villagers from Aulesti and other nearby villages go to the Santa Eufemi Chapel in Urregarai.

== See also ==
- Ibarrola
