= Xabi Aburruzaga =

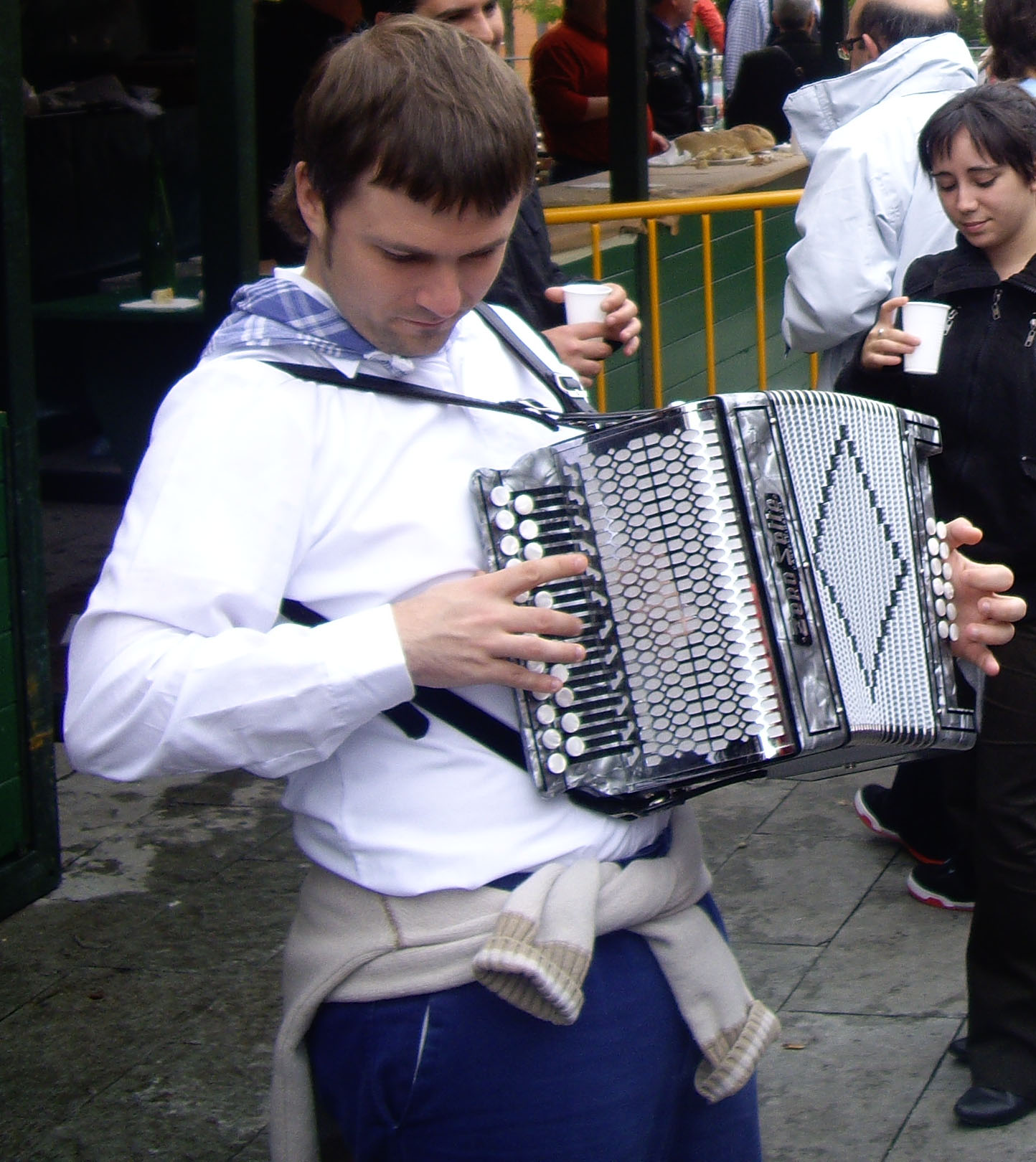
- Xabi Aburruzaga in 2010

Background information
- Born: Xabi Aburruzaga; 10 April 1981 (age 45); Portugalete, Spain
- Genres: Folk
- Occupations: Musician, songwriter
- Instrument: Trikitixa
- Years active: 2000–present
- Website: aburruzaga.com

Xabi Aburruzaga (born 1978 in Portugalete, Euskadi, Spain) is a Basque musician and composer, who is a master of the Trikitixa, the diatonic accordion.

== Biography ==
Xabi Aburruzaga (Portugalete, 1978) is a Biscayan Trikitilari who began studying music when he was seven years old and began playing the Accordion and Piano a year later. His first teacher was Rufino Arrola. Aburruzaga has won multiple awards playing his instrument and has published several books and records.

== Own works ==
In 1999 he released his first album, receiving critical acclaim. The following year he received the proposal for the song "Karmelo Ikastola".

As he became more well known, he launched his Trikitixa's school: Trikileku. At first they were only students from the area but today there are students from all over the province of Bizkaia (Biscay). In 2002 he created a song of Bermeo celebrations, after which he published a new album with the collaboration of Mikel Urdangarin, Joseba Tapia and Iñaki Aurrekoetxea. In 2004 he participated in the song of the Ibilaldia with other artists like Eñaut Elorrieta or Oreka Tx. In 2005 he published the book Bizkaiko Trikitixa with trikitilaris score of Biscay. After publishing the book, he released an album with the same title, which sold a significant number of records. This led to his publishing another book and record, based on a song written by Faustino Arrola, adapting it to the new sounds of more modern music. On this project, he collaborated with various artists such as Amaia Oreja, Mikel Markez, Leturia and Xabi Zeberio.

In 2009 he published an album with lyrics, Denboraren Naufragoa, with texts of Kirmen Uribe accompanying the music. Currently, he is continuing new projects, as well as collaborating with the group, Oskorri. In 2010 he was invited to the famous Ortigueira's Folk Festival.

== Discography ==
- Denboraren Naufrago (2009)
- Bizkaiko Trikitixa Diskoa (2007)
- Sakabi (2007)
- Bizkaiko Trikitixa liburua (2005)
- Alkarregaz heldu ibilaldia (2004)
- Egunaro egunaro kalien (2002)
- Maketa (2001)
- Karmelo Ikastolako Kanta (2000)
