= Ibarrola =

Coordinates: 43.2937°N 2.5713°W

Ibarrola is a village (pueblo) within the municipality of Aulesti, Biscay province, in the Basque Country of northeastern Spain. As of 2004, it had a population of 86 inhabitants.
