= Goierria-Ziortza =

Spanish Town

Coordinates: 43.247555°N 2.559729°W

Goierria-Ziortza is a Spanish town in the municipality of Markina-Xemein, in the province of Biscay in the autonomous Basque Country.
