= Munitibar-Arbatzegi Gerrikaitz =

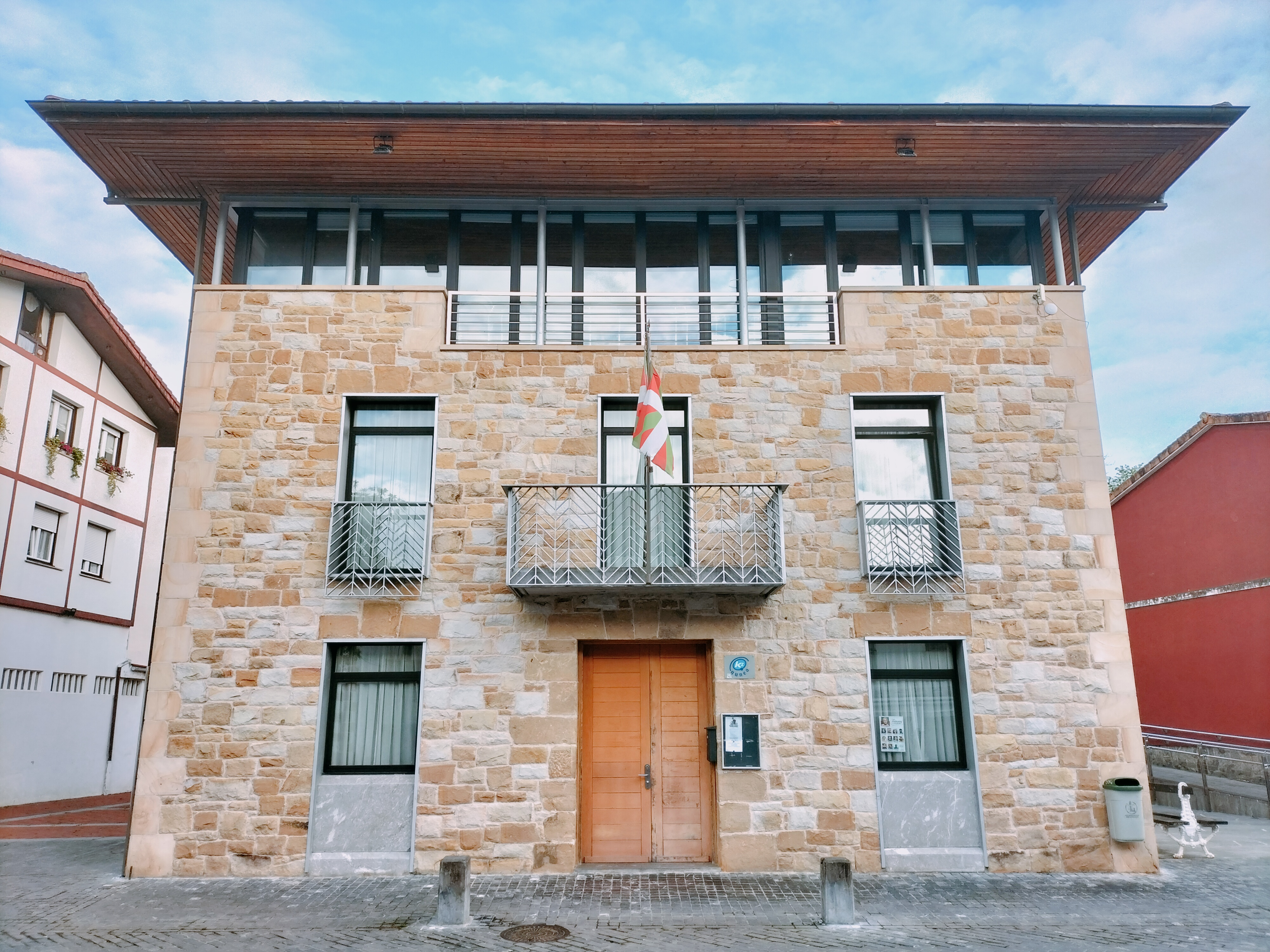
- Town hall

- Coat of arms

- Location of Munitibar-Arbatzegi Gerrikaitz within the Basque Country Location of Munitibar-Arbatzegi Gerrikaitz within Spain
- Coordinates: 43°15′23″N 2°35′41″W
- Country: Spain
- Autonomous community: Basque Country
- Province: Biscay
- Comarca: Lea-Artibai

Government
  - Mayor: Iker Belaustegi Oar

Area
  - Total: 24.07 km^{2} (9.29 sq mi)
- Elevation: 188 m (617 ft)

Population (2025-01-01)
  - Total: 467
  - Density: 19.4/km^{2} (50.3/sq mi)
- Time zone: UTC+1 (CET)
  - Summer (DST): UTC+2 (CEST)
- Postal code: 48381
- Website: www.munitibar.org

Munitibar-Arbatzegi Gerrikaitz is a town and municipality located in the province of Biscay, in the autonomous community of Basque Country, northern Spain.
