= Nero Marquina marble =

Black limestone from Spain

Nero Marquina

Nero Marquina marble (mármol Negro Marquina) is a high quality, black bituminous limestone extracted from the region of Markina, Basque Country in northern Spain. This variety of natural stone gets its black color from naturally occurring bitumen.

It is one of the most important "marbles" from Spain. It has a fine and compact grain with a black background and white veins, which can be abundant.
