= Armintxe Cave =

Cave and archaeological site in Spain

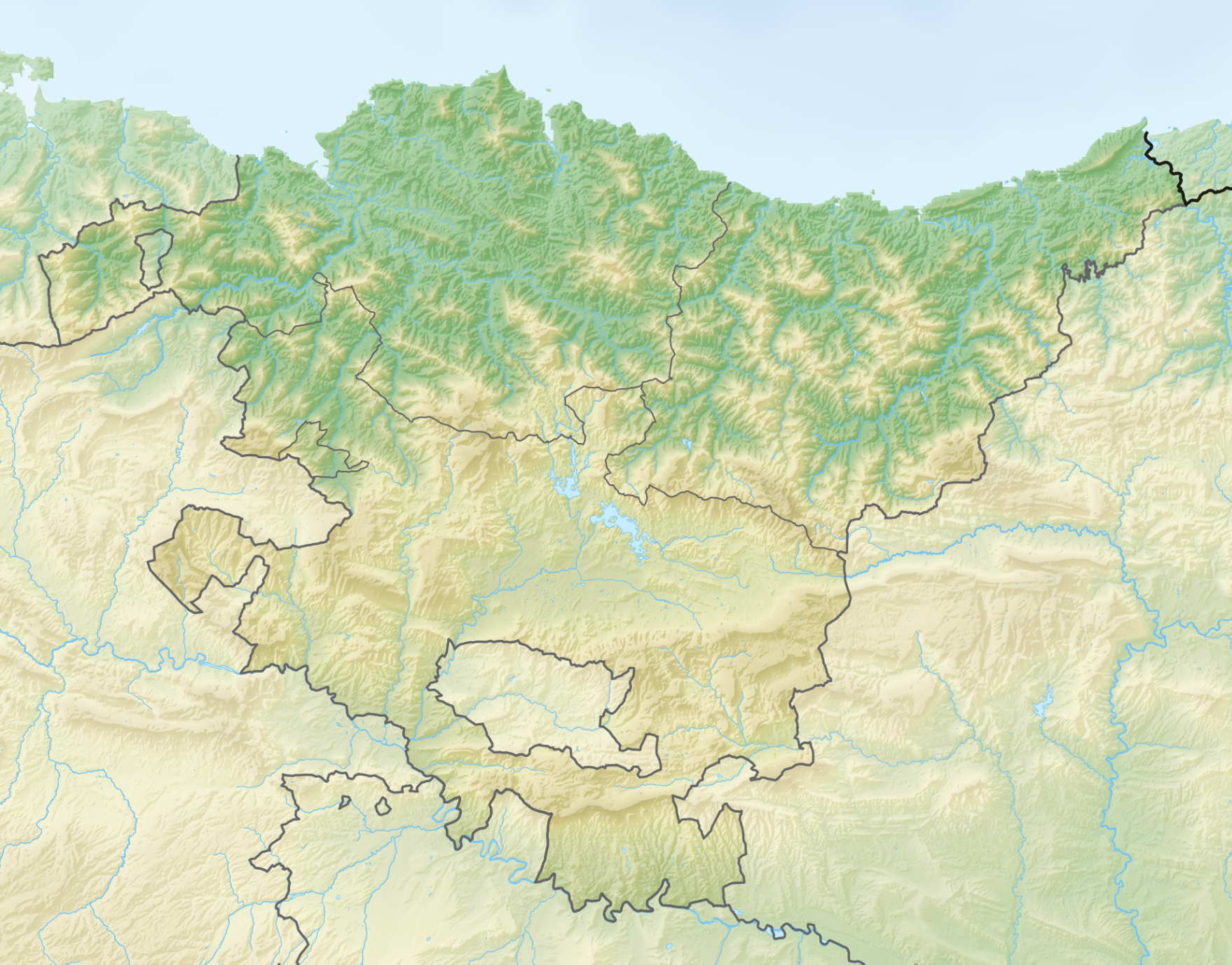
- Location within the Basque Country Location within Spain
- Location: Lekeitio, Basque Country, Spain
- Coordinates: 43°21′43″N 2°30′29″W
- Visitors: no
- Features: prehistoric parietal art

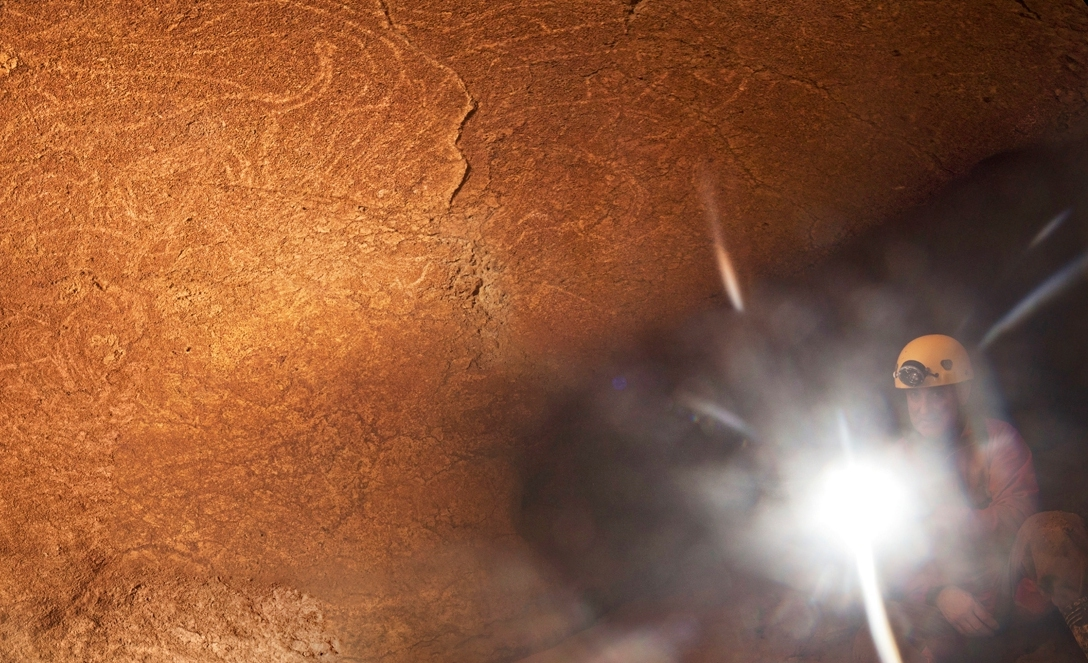
The Main Panel, in the day of the discovery.

Armintxe Cave in Lekeitio (Spain) is an important Paleolithic rock art site, estimated to date from between 12,000 and 14,500 years ago.

== Location ==
Armintxe Cave is situated in the Lekeitio municipality of the Biscay province, in the Basque Country, northern Spain.

== Discovery ==
Although the cave was known from a long time ago, it was believed that it disappeared because of the urbanization and construction works made at the end of the 20th century and beginnings of the 21st. It was found again and explored on May 1, 2016, by eight speleologists from the Basque group ADES Espeleologia Elkartea. After opening the entrance duct, located on a hillside in an urban environment, the cavers entered unknown galleries, and forced a step to a room where they found the panel of engravings.

== Rock art ==
Some of these forms and the etching technique used were announced to be "identical" to those found in the French Pyrenees which suggests that there could have been links between the inhabitants of both areas. Already described as a “treasure of humanity.” the depictions are among the largest found to date – some measuring up to 1.5 m (4.92 ft) in length. A surprise was the first Paleolithic representation of two lions in the region. In a first analysis the etchings were estimated to date from between 12,000 and 14,500 years ago.

The main panel is beautifully and masterly carved with animal figures, displayed in a complex composition, suggesting some sort of perspective. All of them have been engraved with the same technique, scratching the soft limestone with the fingers or with a dull point, resulting in very detailed and easy to see figures. The animals are represented with high detail, typical from Magdalenian art style. Represented animals are horses, bisons, ibex and some carnivores. One of these carnivores has been interpreted as a lion, which is an animal rarely present in Magdalenian art. Besides, several signs, including clear claviforms, have been found there. The conventions used for representing animals and the presence of claviforms suggest that the figures could be related to the Late Magdalenian art.

Not open to the public, 'extremely difficult to access', located under a residential building in the center of Lekeitio, the need to preserve the paintings outlines the current impossibility to access the artwork.

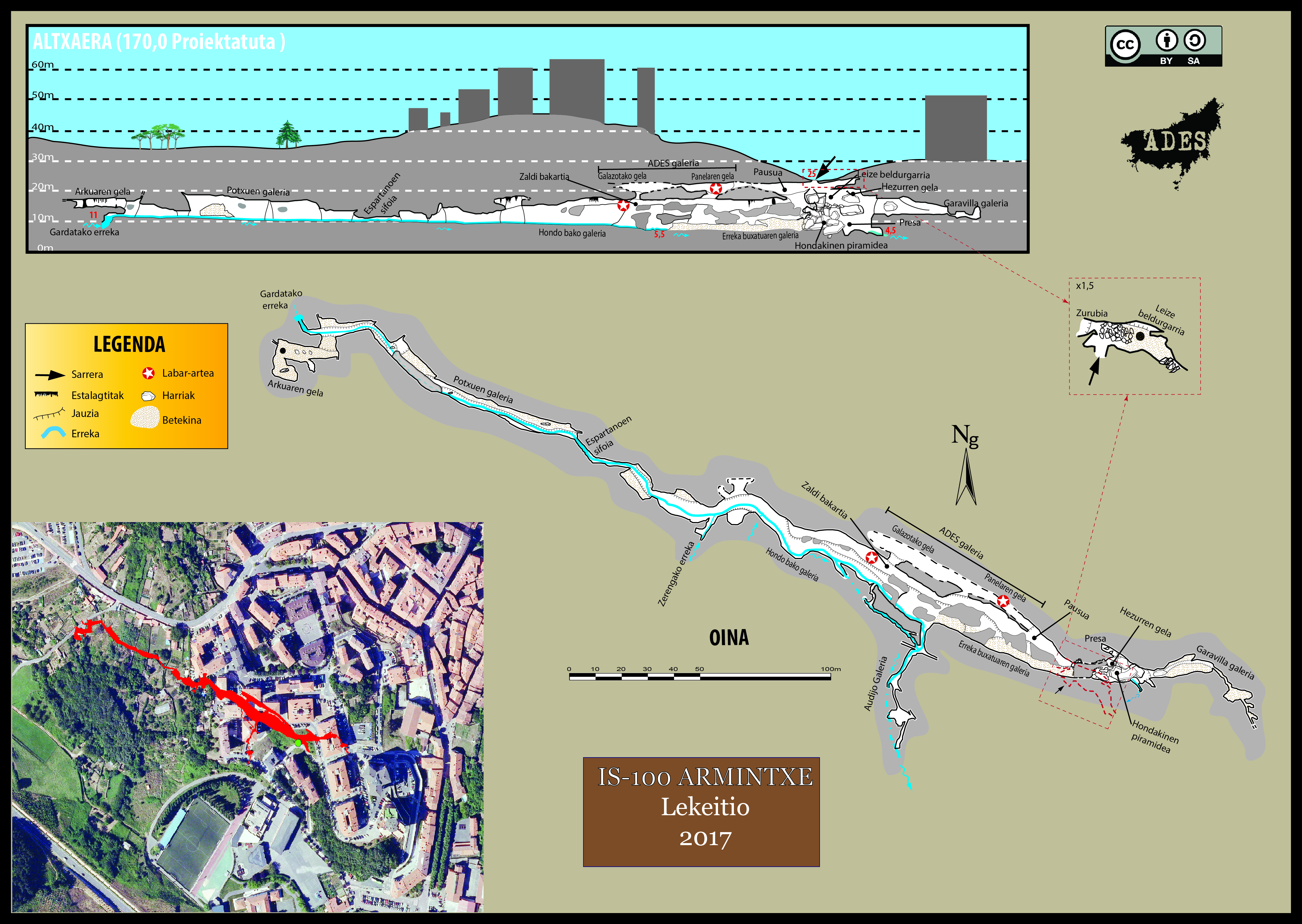
Map of the cave, including the location of the etchings.

== Conservation ==
The cave has a serious problem with floodings, due to construction and urbanization activities which have profoundly altered the course of the underground river. The episodic inundation of most of the galleries of Armintxe has already brought the deterioration of an undetermined part of the artistic heritage it encloses, and threatens to destroy the whole art ensemble. To solve the problem, it is necessary to finish the exploration in order to understand the hydrogeological behaviour of the karst as a whole; but this exploration is actually paralysed due to disagreements between Administration, archaeologists and speleologists.

== See also ==
- Caves of Midi-Pyrénées
- Cave of Niaux
