= Trikiti =

Basque diatonic button accordion

Trikiti being played

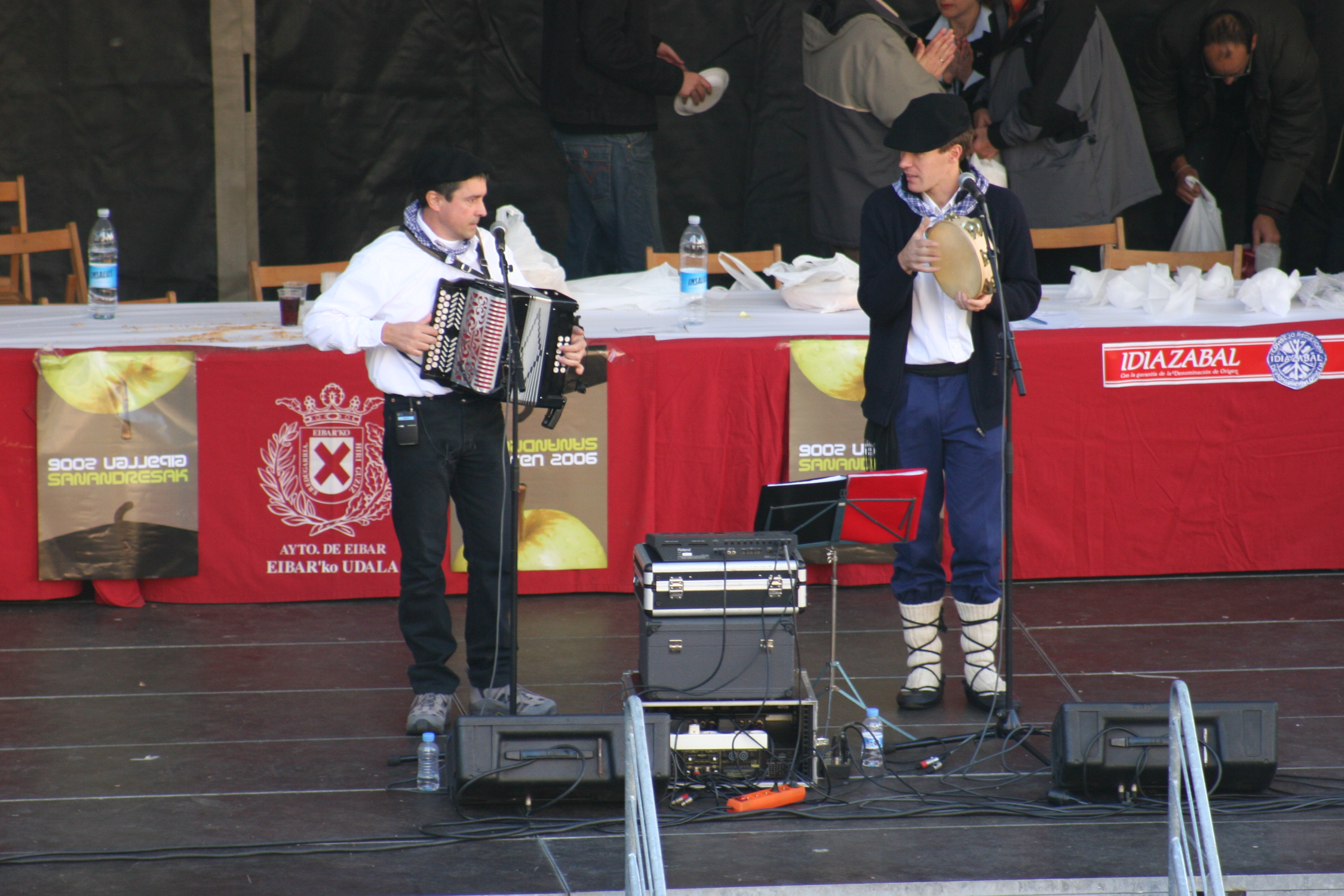
Performance featuring a trikiti with tambourine accompaniment

The trikiti (standard Basque, pronounced [trikiti]), trikitixa (dialectal Basque, pronounced [trikitiʃa]), or eskusoinu txiki ("little hand-sound", pronounced [es̺kus̺oɲu tʃiki])) is a two-row Basque diatonic button accordion with right-hand rows keyed a fifth apart and twelve unisonoric bass buttons. The onomatopoeia trikitixa, apparently stemming from the sound emitted by the tambourine, originally referred to a traditional Basque ensemble, made up of the instrument which now bears the name as well as alboka, txistu and other instruments.

Probably introduced by Italian immigrants coming from the Alps, the trikitixa's first written evidence is attested late in the 19th century, exactly in 1889, when diatonic accordion was used for music in a popular pilgrimage festivity of Urkiola (Biscay). In 1890, a trikiti appears in a picture taken in Altsasu (Navarre), a railway junction. Therefore, some point to the instrument's import to the Basque Country from Italy through the port of Bilbao, while other sources suggest that this kind of diatonic accordion was brought in by Italian railway workers from the Alps. The diatonic button accordion itself was devised in Vienna in 1829, expanding thereafter all over Europe.

The pair of diatonic button accordion along with tambourine gradually grew in popularity and was adopted to perform in local and popular festivities, where the young danced to its tunes (fandangos, arin-arin etc.), despite the Catholic Church's resistance, who dubbed it "hell's bellows" on the grounds that its dance-inciting and lively music would lead Basque youths into temptation.

That playing pattern remained unchanged up to the 1980s, when Kepa Junkera and Joseba Tapia started to develop unprecedented ways of playing trikiti. While both authors came in for much criticism for their novelties and experimenting, they caught on and both styles, traditional and modern trikiti, have found their way and consolidated their separate paths. Both performers remain nowadays key figures of trikiti accordion. There have been influences of Tejano artists like Flaco Jiménez and other international players. Other renowned players include Alaitz Telletxea, Iñaki Malbadi, Maixa Lizarribar, Xabi Solano, Xabi Aburruzaga, Iker Goenaga and the Catalan Carles Belda.

Currently traditional style ensembles consist of a pair playing trikiti (diatonic button accordion), tambourine and voice. Players typically use a highly ornamented and swift style, along with staccato triplets.

== See also ==
- Bandoneon
- Accordion
