= Nicolasa Pradera =

Spanish cook

Nicolasa Pradera (1870–1959) was a Basque chef, restaurateur, and is most known for her cookbook "La cocina de Nicolasa" (the Kitchen of Nicolasa), which is one of the staples of Basque cooking.

== Biography ==
Nicolasa Pradera Mendive was born on 7 December 1870 in Markina-Xemein, of the Basque Country of northern Spain. Between 1890 and 1912, she served as a cook in the Londaur Palace for the Gaytan de Ayala family and after leaving their service opened a restaurant in San Sebastián at #4 Aldamar Street with her husband Narciso Dolhagaray Picabea, a prominent butcher. In 1932, she sold the restaurant and bought another establishment with her sons. She named the restaurant "Andia" and it was located on the Paseo de La Concha. (Walkway of Shells). In 1933, she published a cookbook "La cocina de Nicolasa", which contains a wide variety of Basque recipes and is a staple for Basque chefs, having gone into nearly 20 reprintings.

In 1940, Pradera sold the restaurant in San Sebastián and moved to Madrid, where she opened the Nicolasa Restaurant, which was originally on Seville street but quickly relocated to #150 Velazquez Street. She died in Madrid in 1959.
