= Ondarroa =

- Municipality
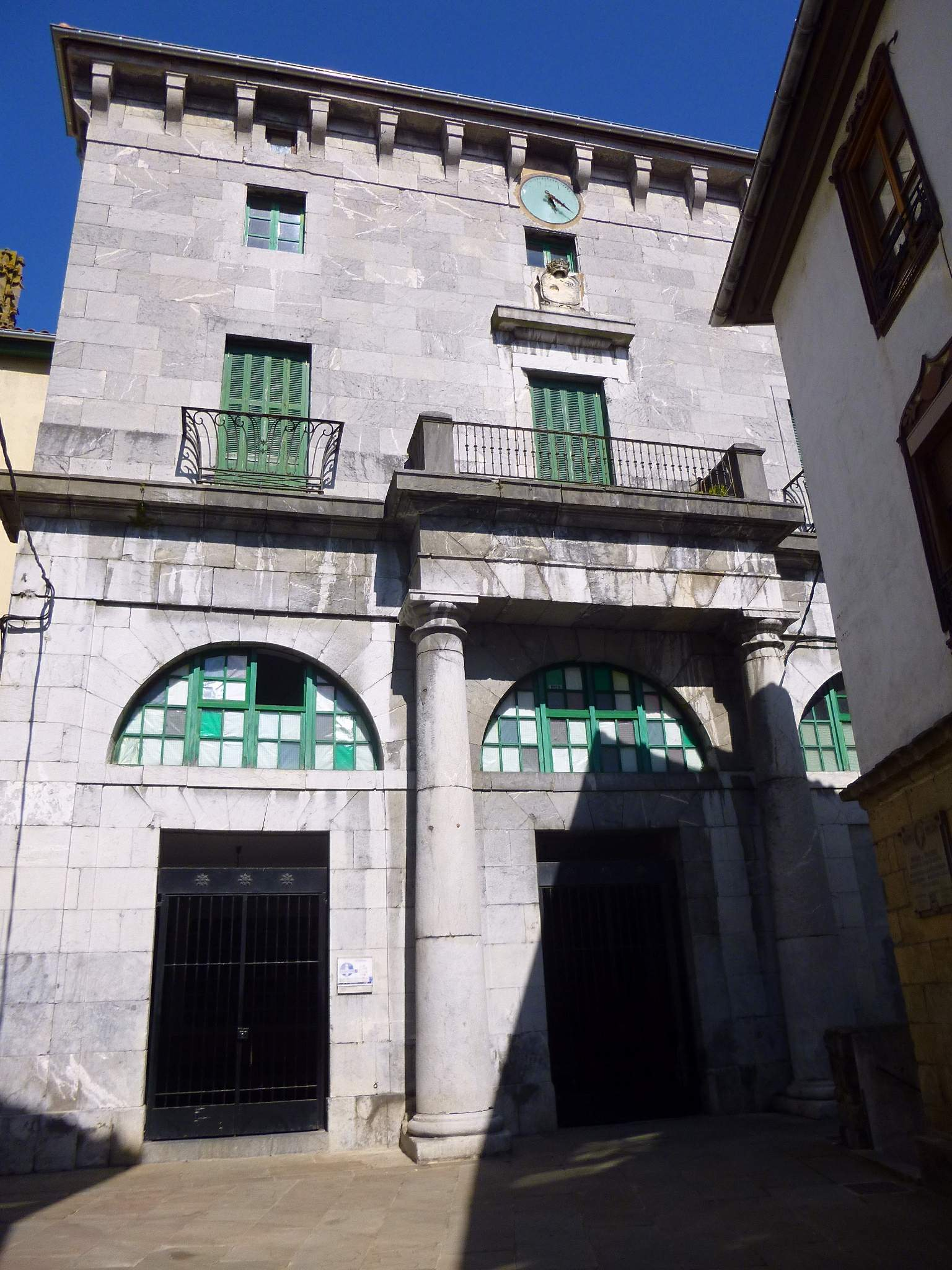
- Town hall

- Coat of arms

- Location of Ondarroa within the Basque Country Location of Ondarroa within Spain
- Coordinates: 43°19′19″N 2°25′10″W
- Country: Spain
- Autonomous community: Basque Country
- Province: Biscay
- Comarca: Lea-Artibai

Government
  - Mayor: Urtza Alkorta Arrizabalaga (EH Bildu)

Area
  - Total: 3.6 km^{2} (1.4 sq mi)

Population (2025-01-01)
  - Total: 8,060
  - Density: 2,200/km^{2} (5,800/sq mi)
- Demonym: Ondarrutarra
- Time zone: UTC+1 (CET)
- Postal code: 48700
- Website: Official website

Ondarroa is a town and municipality located in the province of Biscay, in the autonomous community of the Basque Country, northern Spain.

== Main sights ==
- Church of St. Mary, in late Gothic style (late 15th century)
- Likona Tower, a typical Basque tower-house.
- Itsas Aurre Bridge, designed by Santiago Calatrava
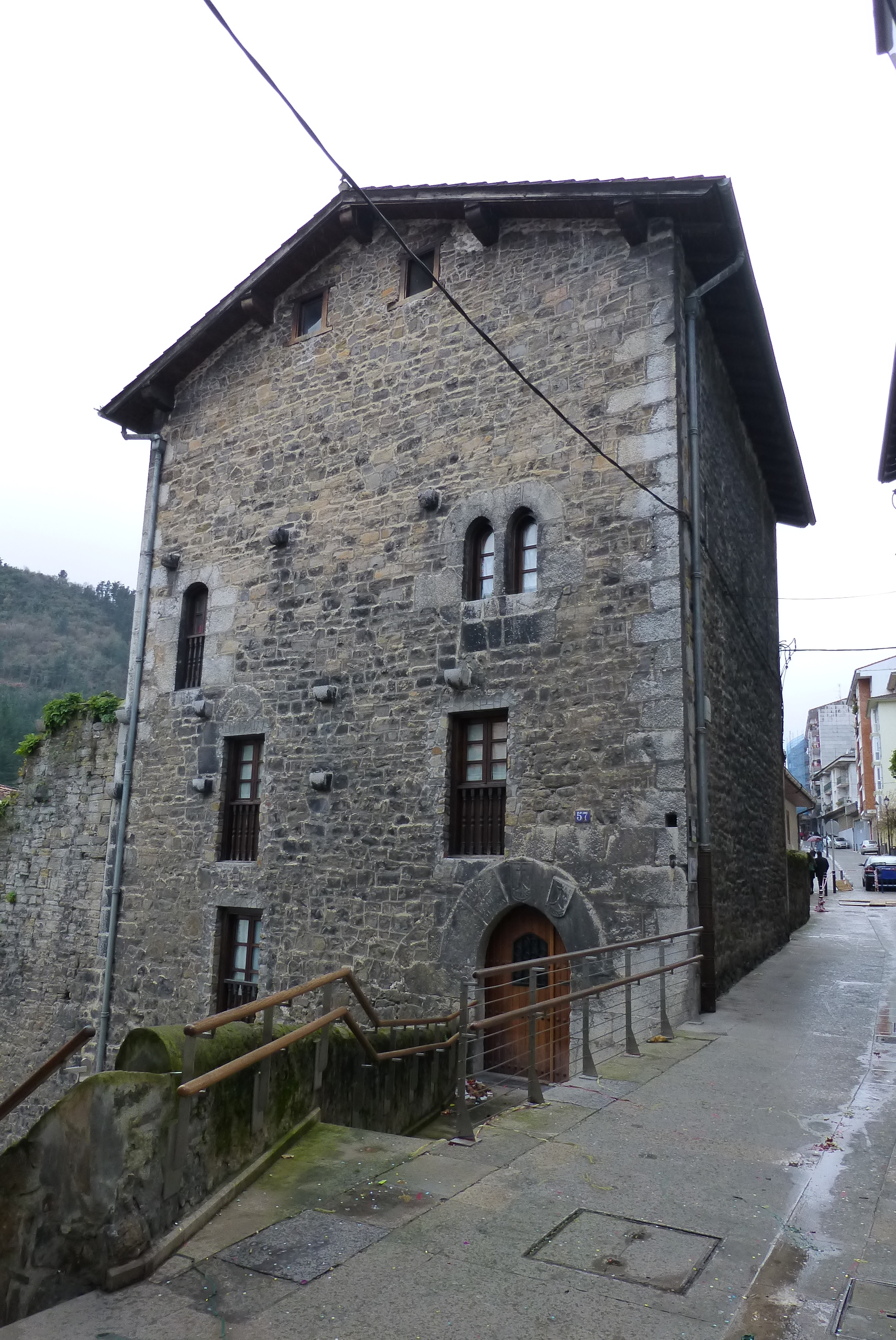
Likona Tower

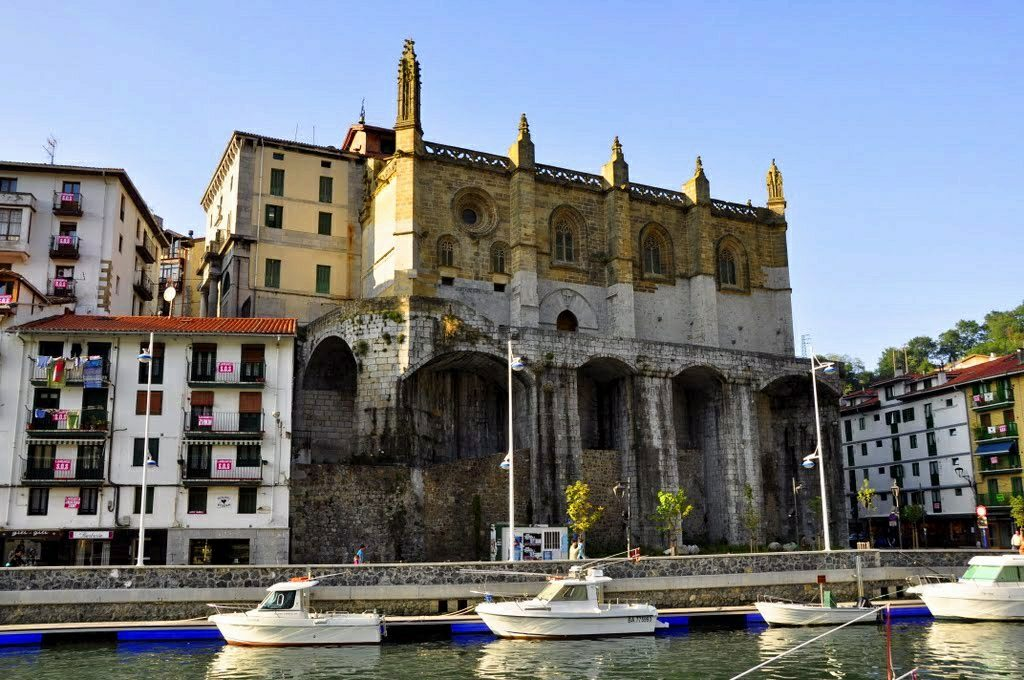
Church of St. Mary

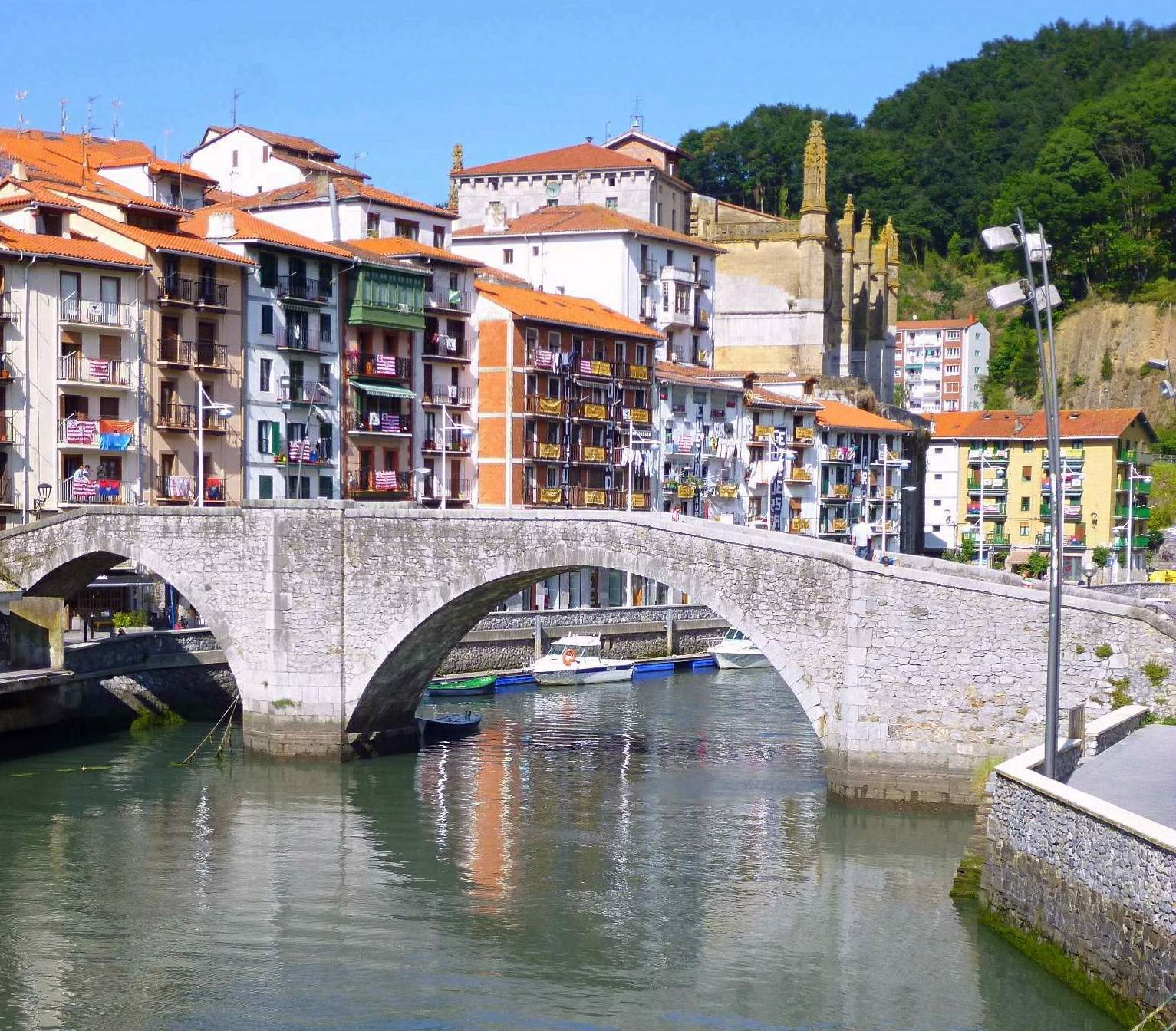
Old Bridge

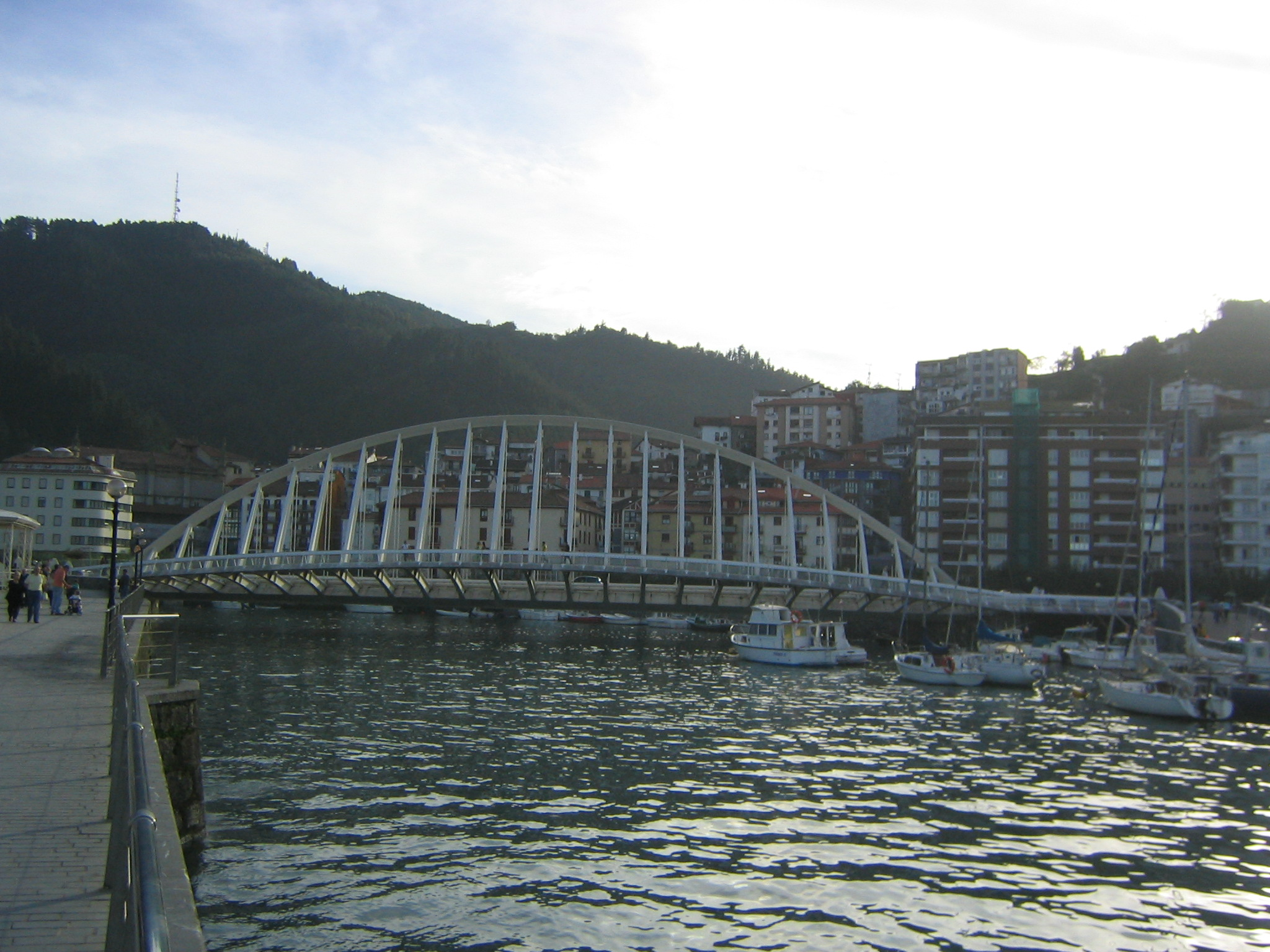
Itsas Aurre Bridge

== People ==
- Pedro Maria Unanue (1814-1846)
- Txomin Agirre (1864-1920)
- Agustin Zubikarai (1914-2004)
- Karmele Urresti Iturrioz (1916-2010)
- Dina Bilbao (1960-1997) - athlete
- Ana Urkiza (b. 1969) - writer
- Kirmen Uribe (b. 1970) - writer
- Kepa Arrizabalaga (b. 1994) - goalkeeper for Arsenal football club and Spain
- Iñigo Martínez - footballer for Al-Nassr FC

== Twin towns ==
- Santa Flavia, Italy
- Borj, Western Sahara
