= Hybrid novel =

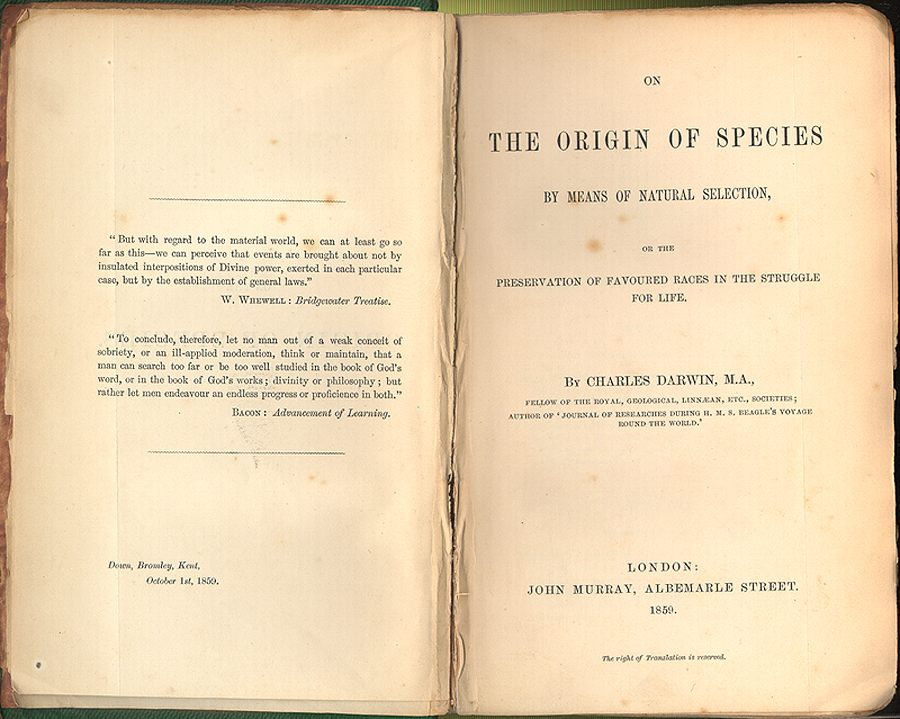
- Formats: Comic strip; Graphic novel; visual narrative
- Authors: Frank Miller; Italo Calvino; Brian Selznick; David Almond; Dave McKean; Neil Gaiman

Subgenres
- Mythopoeia; Speculative

The hybrid novel (also known as intermedial or multi-modal novel) is a form of fiction, characterized by reaching beyond the limits of the anticipated medium through the incorporation of varying storytelling methods, such as poetry, photography, collage, maps, diagrams, posters and illustrations . The hybrid novel refers to a broad spectrum of literary work such as the graphic narrative and fusion texts.

== Graphic narrative ==
One form of the hybrid novel is the graphic narrative, which characteristically is abundant with a cross-breed of sequences containing text and of panels of images. The notion of graphic narrative formerly referred to the spectrum of literary work concerned with vividly and visually explicit narrative. In contemporary discussions, the graphic narrative is now considered an umbrella term that designates the narrative use of sequentially arranged photographs or drawings, often supported by speech bubbles, captions, and other verbal elements. A specific example of a type of graphic narrative would be graphic novels and comics.

The opening of literature and literary studies to graphic novel and comics is commonly assumed to be a postmodern phenomenon, emerging from evolution such as the unremitting hybridization of media and art forms and the progressive dismantling of the frontiers between high and low art. The blend of literature, (a traditional form of high art), and comics and graphic novels, (a developing low art) is a suitable case of this tendency.

According to Shaun Tan, when it concerns rules of form and style, the graphic novel (one example medium of graphic narrative) is defined by irreverence, experimentation and playfulness. Artists working in the highly flexible medium of the graphic narrative are given room to engineer a personal language, that is tailored best to suit the ideas in which they present. For illustration, an illustrator's language entails image, page layout, text, physical format, media, and typography.

=== Criticisms as a lowbrow medium ===
Within the field of visual storytelling, imposed by the spread of mobile images or the amalgamation of words and images in multiple panels and series, certain image types and media face strong resistance. According to Jan Baetens, this is because such mediums are considered by cultural gatekeepers as lowbrow, or are regarded as hybrid and accordingly impure.

The resistance towards certain forms of storytelling cannot be abridged to 20th century modernism. Historians of the realist novel stress the initial poor reputation of this narrative type, which was not formerly viewed as a culturally legitimate challenger of older and often much fewer narrative types of literature.

The rise of the graphic narrative as a literary form was not imposed by internal changes of the medium, as epitomized by the emergence of the "graphic novel" label during the 1980s, whereby 1986 was a critical year, with the emergence of the first installments of Frank Miller's The Dark Knight Returns and Alan Moore and Dave Gibbons' Watchmen. Rather, the rise of the graphic narrative as a literary form appeared from the social need for relevant storytelling, with the public turning to other forms of literary storytelling, irrespective of the artistic value of its products or to non-literary forms, such as movies and comics and graphic novels, which took the place that high art literary storytelling was no longer occupying around 1990.

== Fusion texts ==
One branch of the hybrid novel is fusion texts, a complex multi-modal text, which is characterized by a fusion of the artistic techniques employed (such as merging genres) with different illustrative mediums, such as, drawing, photo-montage painting, photography, collage and computer-generated imagery.

Whilst fusion text is a new phenomenon, its precursor emerged over 30 years ago, with the emergence of comic book and strip artists evolving in their craft the interplay of images and words, achieving a cross breeding of prose and illustration.

The multifaceted fusion texts often merges features from graphic novels and comics and those from picture books where image and text operate discordantly or in harmony. As a result, it creates a unique form of cross-breed, hybrid text that is innovative in bringing something new in concern to visual texts and a platform in which illustrators and authors alike are able to be imaginative with their ideas and thoughts.

Furthermore, Fusion texts often presents its readers with various reading pathways. Given that fusion texts often contain non-linear text and the general omission of forthright text typology, they can be considered challenging to read. In this respect, fusion texts can be viewed as a similar medium to postmodern picture books. Within the flexible realm of fusion texts, authors are given space to experiment with what is real and what is fiction, as well as a play with numerous perspectives in terms of illustrations, content and voice.

== Examples ==
The combination of mediums in fiction are indicative of a hybrid novel. These novels, discussed below, integrate other mediums. For example, The Castle of Crossed Destinies (1977) by Italo Calvino incorporates tarot cards and the fusion text The Invention of Hugo Cabret (2007) by Brian Selznick, combines elements of picture books, graphic novels and film.

=== The Invention of Hugo Cabaret (2007) ===
Brian Selznick's fusion text The Invention of Hugo Cabret (2007) is a transmedia work of art, that draws upon an amalgamation of wordless illustrations and text to tell a single narrative. Through merging elements of graphic novels, picture books, and film, with alternating pages of black and white illustration and written text, Selznick has fashioned a cinematic, movie-like book, evocative of early black-and-white films and reminiscent of Georges Méliès' 1902 film A Trip to the Moon.

=== Castle of Cross Destinies (1977) ===
Italo Calvino's Castle of Crossed Destinies comprises two parts, The Castle of Crossed Destinies and The Tavern of Crossed Destinies, both of which are created from tarot cards and can be read as a complete work. Within the novel, unnamed homodiegetic narrator generates narrative from subsets of tarot cards, the images of which are reproduced in the margins of the book, allowing readers to draw comparisons between the images with the ekphrastic narratives they inspire.

=== The Savage (2008) and Slogs Dad (2010) ===
David Almond and Dave McKean's The Savage and Slog's Dad (Walker Books) are both fusion books which combines elements from picture books, illustrated story books and graphic novels. For example, in The Savage, panels are created entirely out of window-shutters and windows.

=== The Day I Swapped My Dad for Two Goldfish (1997) and The Wolves in the Walls (2003) ===
The Day I Swapped My Dad for Two Goldfish and The Wolves in the Walls were created by Neil Gaiman and Dave McKean. Both books incorporate unusual narrative and illustrative art styles. Illustrations such as washed over ink drawings that have been filled in with vibrant colors, decorate each page. The pages are intermixed by amalgamations of cartoons, photographs, and drawings, with words dispersed all over the page, ranging from going down and up to across the page. Fonts are playfully varied within the same sentence and words are written in bold at random. In addition, real photographs are incorporated within the illustrated world such as photographs of fish within "The Day i Swapped my Dad for Two Goldfish" and photographs of wolves eyes within "The Wolves in the Wall." According to J. Garrett, it is the fusion between the real and unreal that brands McKean as a practitioner of hyper-realism. By creatively melding real and fictitious elements into a convincing new whole, such fusion texts are able to transcend the fantasy experience of the authors own imaginings and the experience of our real-world existences to something in between.

=== The Arrival (2006) ===
The novel The Arrival by Shaun Tan is a case of the hybrid novel in addition to fusion texts. Within it, the novel presents a fusion of differing techniques and styles, for instance, successfully merging visual artwork and written narrative in a unique way. This is because the novel contains no comprehensible words. The sole writing within the novel is depicted in a strange, unknown language – a testimony to the idea language can be not merely inclusive but also exclusive. The novel is made from words-in-pictures, meaning it constructs a powerful narrative through visual means rather than words. The novel, precisely 128 pages in length, often features pages of full artwork. Multiple, tiny, medium and sizable panels and images, many of which are in strips reminiscent of the Portuguese "stories in little squares" are representational of words and letters that fuse together to form image-parallels of sentences. Additionally, most of the pictures are not static. While the preliminary fragments of the novel questionably are, the tiny square pictures within the majority of The Arrival accelerate and accumulate together to fashion a powerful impression of the moving image. This distinct, and persistent impression of a close temporal relation between images and the forward momentum within them, create a striking similarities to a film sequence. Furthermore, Tan's stylistic use of pencil on paper creates the graphic surface's grains and tones in a manner that recalls old movies. The graphic surface is designed from subdued sepia colors which is suggestive of an earlier time and likens the novel to a photograph album from a bygone age, that is encoded as a form of emotional mise-en-abyme and memory. Hence The Arrival, despite being a novel, is inspired by mediums such as films and old photographs. In this respect, the novel, despite following typically western conventions of reading from left to right and front to back, transcends language barriers.

=== The Wall (2007) ===
The Wall: Growing Up Behind the Iron Curtain written in 2007 by Peter Sís, couples period photography, journal entries, blocks of print and historical context, with Sis's remarkable artistry, to create a powerful evocation of his childhood throughout the Cold War in Czechoslovakia. By merging a cross-breed of mediums he is able to powerfully capture the experience of the Soviet-occupied country. It tells of Sís's yearning to escape the tyranny posed by the Iron Curtain in addition to his desire to engage in the forbidden fruits revealed to him through western news; for example rock and roll, blue jeans, the Beatles, and Coca-Cola. Thick, meticulously, black-and-white crosshatched drawings of red-flagged houses and parades are captioned by the likes of authoritarian commands such as: "Public displays of loyalty—compulsory."

== Pictured ekphrasis ==
Pictured ekphrasis is one aspect of the fusion of text and picture that emerge in the hybrid novel. Here, pictured ekphrasis refers to ekphrasis that is accompanied by an image. The rich presence of images in fiction galvanizes anew ways of ekphrastic practices. Generally, such kinds of visual representations include photography, maps, diagrams, movies, and theatrical spectacles.

This is demonstrated most famously in Ransom Riggs's Miss Peregrine's Home for Peculiar Children (2011) and Steve Martin's An Object of Beauty (2004) bewitching images visually puncture the narrative. Though An Object of Beauty focuses on the traditional objects of ekphrasis, artworks, Riggs's Miss Peregrine's extensively utilizes vintage photographs. By interspersing the text with images, in both novels these ekphrasis emphasizes images' are endowed with powers of agency.

== Radical change theory ==
Radical change is a theory coined by Eliza T. Dresang which explains the synergistic amalgamation of changing resources and youth in the digital age. It provides a lens through which to analyse, the effect radical changes in digital technologies have in facilitating concomitant changes (such as forms, formats, perspectives, and boundaries) for an increasing cadre of books.

One significant dramatic Digital Age change in relation to novels is the dynamic hybrid novel. Sean Stewart and Jordan Weisman's young-adult novel Cathy's Book: If Found Call (650) 266-8233 (2006), is an illustration of the hybrid novel, given that the text is thoroughly integrated by website addresses, letters, pictures, birth certificates, doodles and phone numbers within the margins, for the purpose of solving the mysterious disappearance of a partner posed within the novel.
