= Xabi Garalde =

Spanish footballer

Personal information
- Full name: Xabier Garalde Gorostola
- Date of birth: 5 July 1988 (age 38)
- Place of birth: Berriatua, Spain
- Height: 1.85 m (6 ft 1 in)
- Position: Centre back

Team information
- Current team: Eibar

Youth career
- Berriatuko

Senior career*
Years	Team	Apps	(Gls)
2005–2007	Berriatuko		
2007–2011	Eibar B		
2009–2011	Eibar	1	(0)
- * Club domestic league appearances and goals

Xabier "Xabi" Garalde Gorostola (born 5 July 1988) is a Spanish footballer who played in the Segunda División for SD Eibar as a central defender.
