= Gizaburuaga =

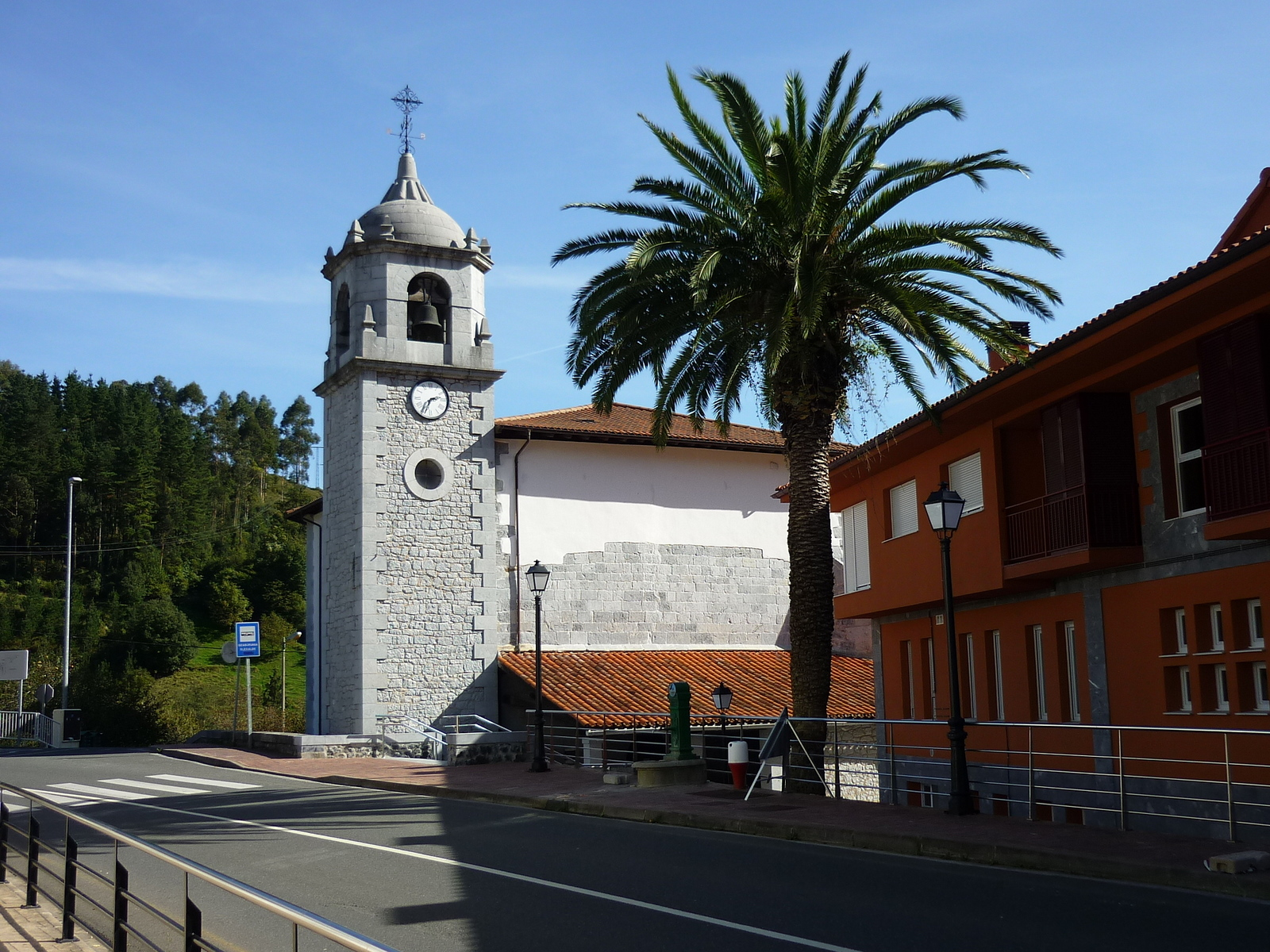
- Church of Saint Catherine, Gizaburuaga

- Coat of arms

- Location of Gizaburuaga within the Basque Country Location of Gizaburuaga within Spain
- Coordinates: 43°19′50″N 2°32′17″W
- Country: Spain
- Autonomous community: Biscay

Area
  - Total: 6.32 km^{2} (2.44 sq mi)
- Elevation: 42 m (138 ft)

Population (2025-01-01)
  - Total: 196
  - Density: 31.0/km^{2} (80.3/sq mi)
- Time zone: UTC+1 (CET)
  - Summer (DST): UTC+2 (CEST)
- Website: www.gizaburuaga.eu

Gizaburuaga is a town and municipality located in the province of Biscay, in the autonomous community of Basque Country, northern Spain.
