= Amoroto =

- Municipality
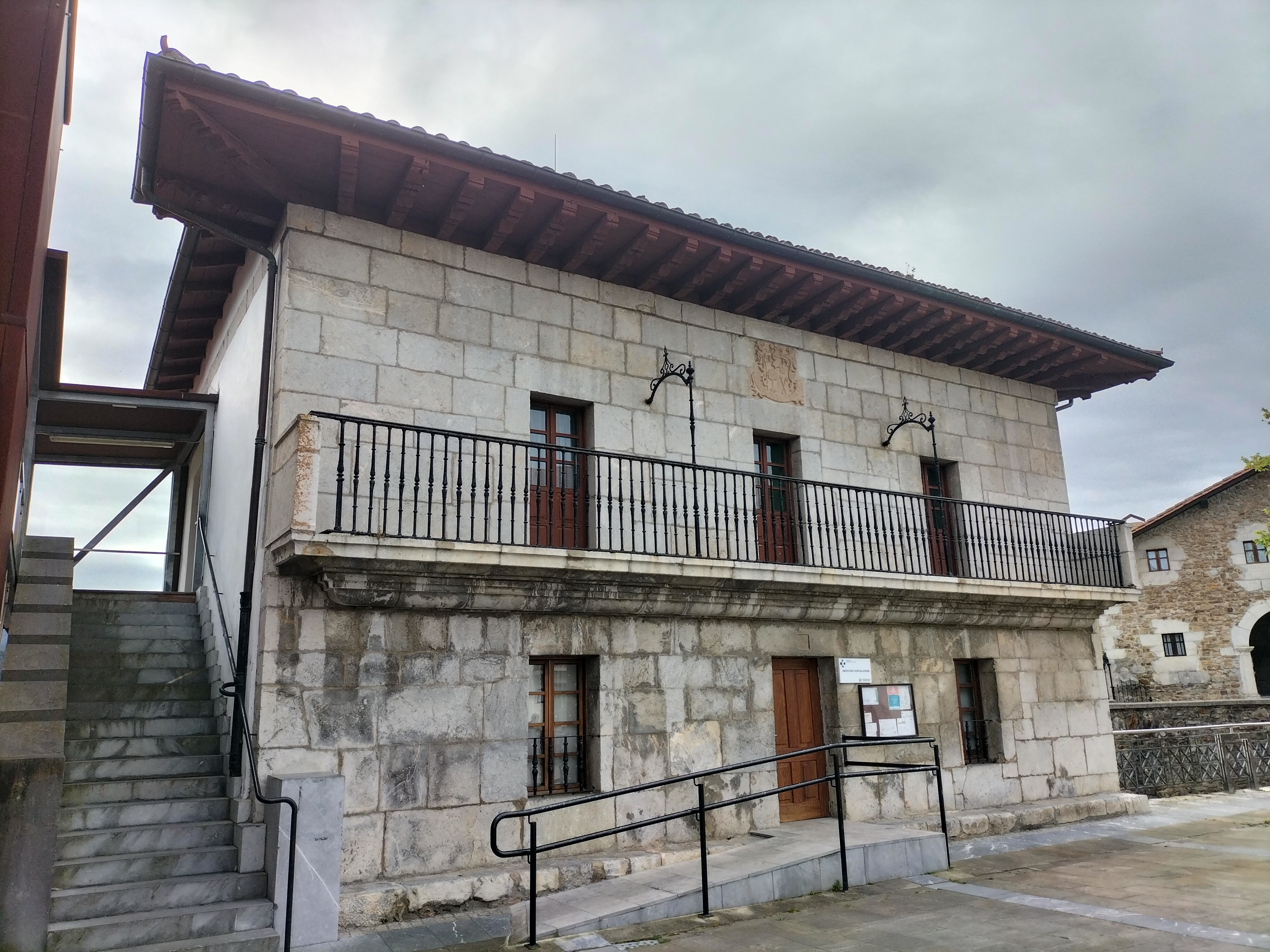
- Town hall

- Flag Coat of arms

- Location of Amoroto within the Basque Country
- Coordinates: 43°19′36″N 2°30′48″W
- Country: Spain
- Autonomous community: Basque Country
- Province: Biscay
- Comarca: Lea-Artibai

Government
  - Mayor: Rafael Malaxetxebarria Plaza (Herriko Kandidatura)

Area
  - Total: 13.40 km^{2} (5.17 sq mi)
- Elevation: 180 m (590 ft)

Population (2025-01-01)
  - Total: 390
  - Density: 29/km^{2} (75/sq mi)
- Demonym: Basque: amorotarra
- Time zone: UTC+1 (CET)
  - Summer (DST): UTC+2 (CEST)
- Postal code: 48289
- Official language(s): Basque; Spanish
- Website: Official website

Amoroto is a town and municipality located in the province of Biscay, in the Basque Country.
