= Mendexa =

- Municipality
- Mendeja
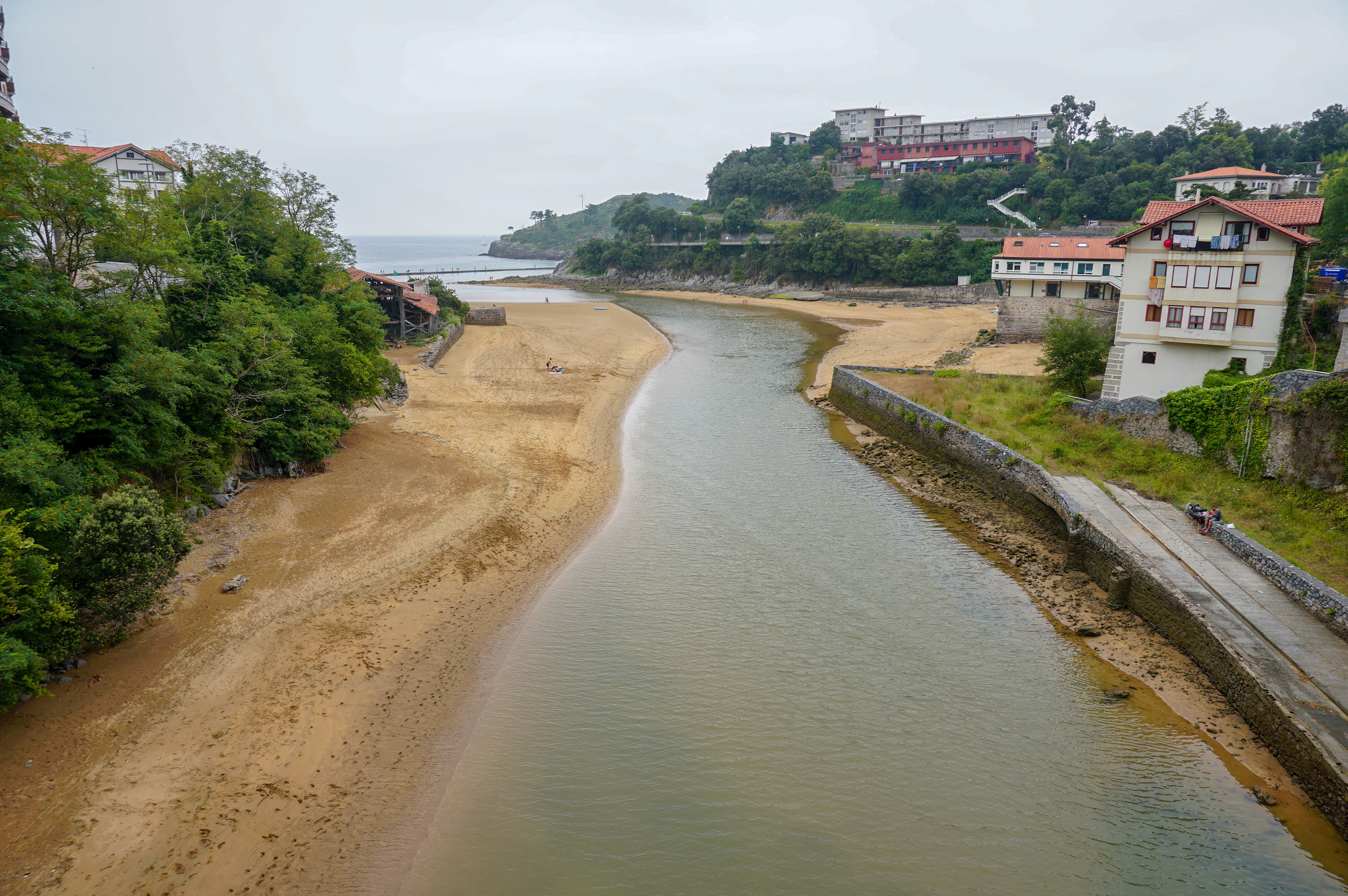

- Flag Coat of arms

- Location of Mendexa within the Basque Country
- Coordinates: 43°20′47″N 2°29′0″W
- Country: Spain
- Autonomous community: Basque Country
- Province: Biscay
- Comarca: Lea-Artibai

Government
  - Mayor: Luis Maria Okamika Gogenola (2007)

Area
  - Total: 6.91 km^{2} (2.67 sq mi)
- Elevation: 173 m (568 ft)

Population (2025-01-01)
  - Total: 426
  - Density: 61.6/km^{2} (160/sq mi)
- Demonym: Mendexarra (Spanish: Mendejarras)
- Time zone: UTC+1 (CET)
  - Summer (DST): UTC+2 (CEST)
- Postal code: 48289

Mendexa is a town and municipality located in the province of Biscay, in the autonomous community of Basque Country, northern Spain.
