= Markina-Xemein =

- Municipality
- Marquina-Jeméin (Spanish)
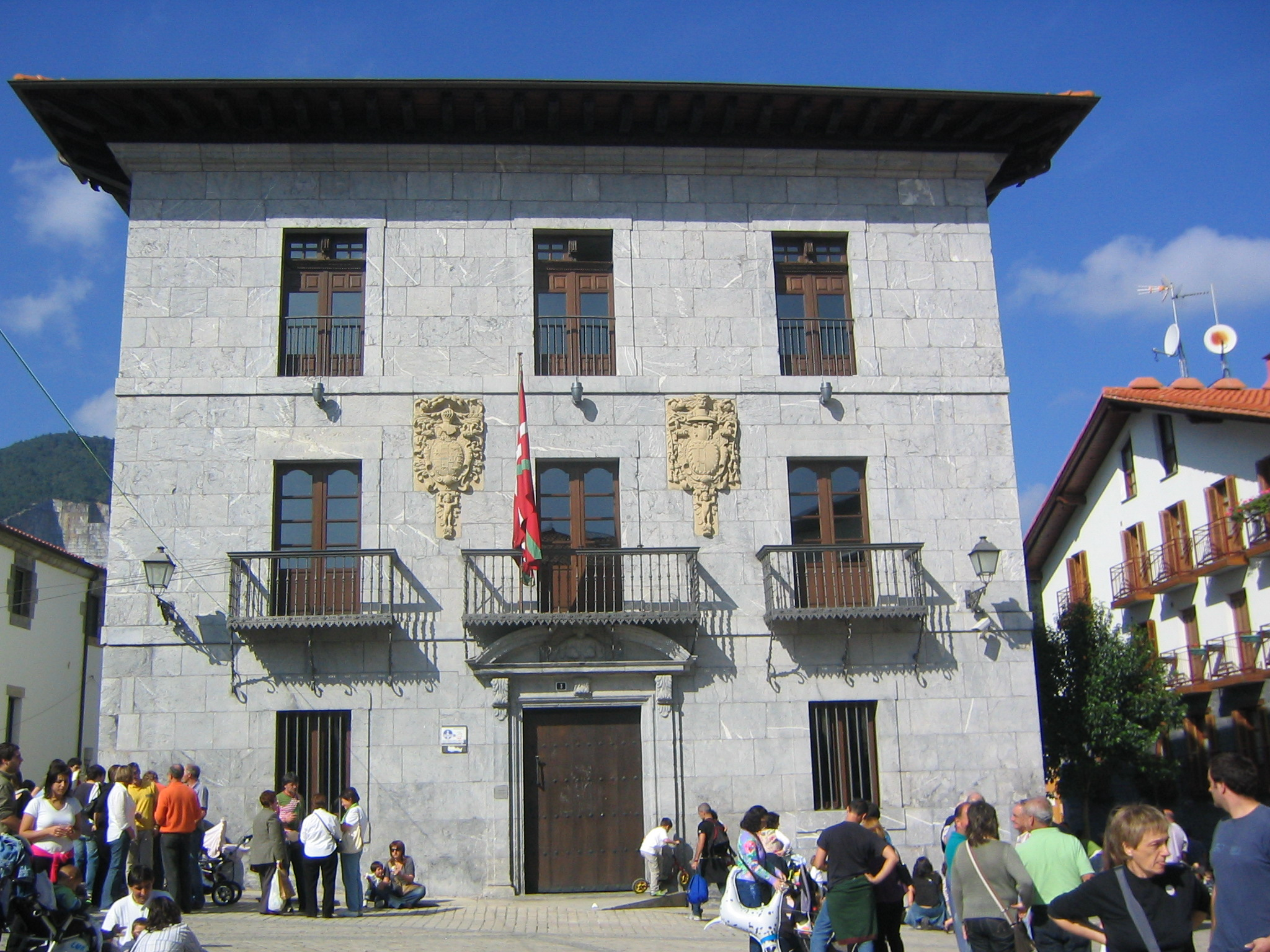
- Town hall

- Coat of arms
- Motto(s): Muy Noble y Muy Leal Villa Marquina-Jeméin (The very noble and loyal village of Markina-Xemein)
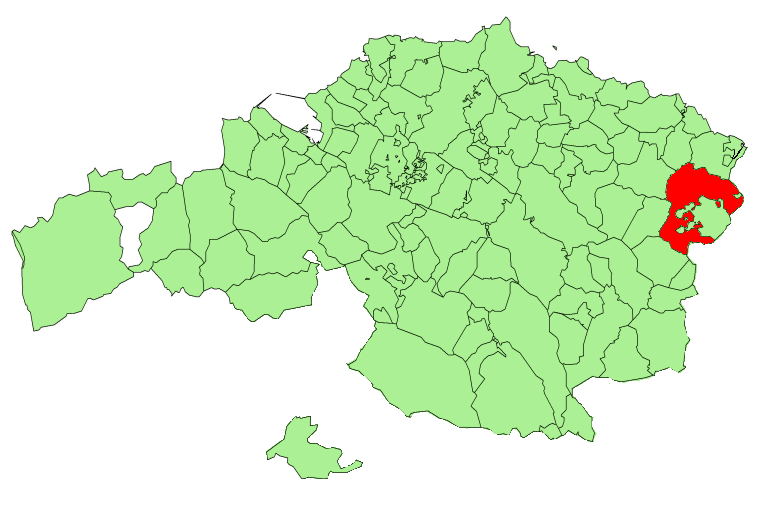
- Location of Markina-Xemein in Bizkaia.

- Location of Markina-Xemein within the Basque Country Location of Markina-Xemein within Spain
- Coordinates: 43°16′8″N 2°29′47″W
- Country: Spain
- Autonomous community: País Vasco
- Province: Biscay
- Comarca: Lea-Artibai
- Founded: 1952

Government
  - Alcalde: Juan Jose Txurruka Txurruka (Bildu)

Area
  - Total: 44.79 km^{2} (17.29 sq mi)
- Elevation: 85 m (279 ft)

Population (2025-01-01)
  - Total: 5,089
  - Density: 113.6/km^{2} (294.3/sq mi)
- Demonym(s): Markinarra, Marquinés/a Xemeindarra, Jemeindarra
- Time zone: UTC+1 (CET)
  - Summer (DST): UTC+2 (CEST)
- Postal code: 48270
- Website: Official website

Markina-Xemein is a town and municipality located in the province of Bizkaia, in the Basque Autonomous Community in northern Spain. The origin of the town's name lies in its geographic location between Gipuzkoa and Bizkaia. Coming from the Spanish word marca meaning "mark", Markina-Xemein is where Gipuzkoanos often battled Bizkainos.

The local economy is mostly based on the primary and secondary sectors, with particular relevance for agriculture and cattle herding, timber research and metal industry. The metal industry has in fact played an important role in the past, through the development of important weapons in the defense industry. Extraction of black marble, known as Nero Marquina (Marmol negro), also plays an important role in the local economy. The high quality of the stone has gained international recognition; it is one of the most important marbles from Spain.

Markina-Xemein keeps a tight connection with Basque pelota sport; in fact its two walled court or frontón is known as "University of the Pelota", since it is the place where great Basket or Jai Alai pelotaris learnt to play.

Markina-Xemein's patronal feast day, honouring Our Lady of Mount Carmel, takes place in the middle of July. The municipality also hosts many fairs and markets throughout the year.

== Geography ==
Markina-Xemein is located in the north east of Biscay, and it is next to the border with Gipuzkoa. Although the village centre is plain, it is surrounded by hills and mountains, most of them 400 to 700 metres high. Oiz, located to the southwest, is 1,026 metres high.

The main river is Artibai, which passes through Markina-Xemein from southwest to northeast. Near the village centre, it is joined by another river from the southeast, Urko.

Markina-Xemein enjoys a mild climate throughout the year, thanks to being located only 10 kilometers from the coast. Winters tend to be a little bit cool and wet, but not snowy. Although summers are relatively hot, temperatures hardly ever go above 35 °C. Apart from that, all the seasons are wet and rainy, so yearly rainfall is above 1550 mm.

== History ==
The village of Markina (called, in that time, Villaviciosa de Marquina in Spanish) was founded by Don Tello, Lord of Biscay (Bizkaia), on May 6, 1355. Don Tello gave permission to the local nobility (jauntxoak in Basque or hidalgos in Spanish) to create and defend the new village from the attacks of the Gipuzkoan nobility.

One of the most astonishing aspects of that foundation was that Markina was not given a parish church for itself. Moreover, it has had to use the existing church of Xemein, which, at that time, was an independent town (an elizate). The patronage of that church was a hot point in their relations, especially in the Middle Ages, and several disputes took places between local nobility. Last century, (September 29, 1952) Markina and Xemein joined each other to found what we know today as the town of Markina-Xemein.

A further enlargement took place on 1969, when Ziortza-Bolibar (a smaller town located to the southwest of Markina-Xemein) joined the village. That union lasted until January 1, 2005, when all the parts concerned reached an agreement by which Ziortza-Bolibar become an independent town.

== Notable people ==
- Nicolasa Pradera (1870-1959), Spanish chef
- José María Arizmendiarrieta (1915-1976), Catholic priest and founder of the Mondragón cooperative movement

== See also ==
- 1980 Markina attack: an attack by the Basque separatist group ETA which killed four people in the town.
- Goierria-Ziortza
