= Basque literature =

Basque literature (Basque: Euskal literatura) refers to books written in the Basque language, spoken in the Basque Country. Although the first instances of coherent Basque phrases and sentences go as far back as the San Millán glosses of around 950, the large-scale damage done by periods of great instability and warfare, such as the clan wars of the Middle Ages, the Carlist Wars and the Spanish Civil War, led to the scarcity of written material predating the 16th century.

The earliest surviving traces of Basque literary activity go back to the 16th century, but significant production does not seem to have set in until the 17th century. Since the end of the Francoist period in Spain, the formation of a standard language, and the large scale introduction of Basque into the education system consequently increased literary activity. While much of the literature written in Basque remains targeted at the native audience, some works by Basque authors have been translated into other languages, such as Bernardo Atxaga, and achieved global recognition.

== The 16th century ==
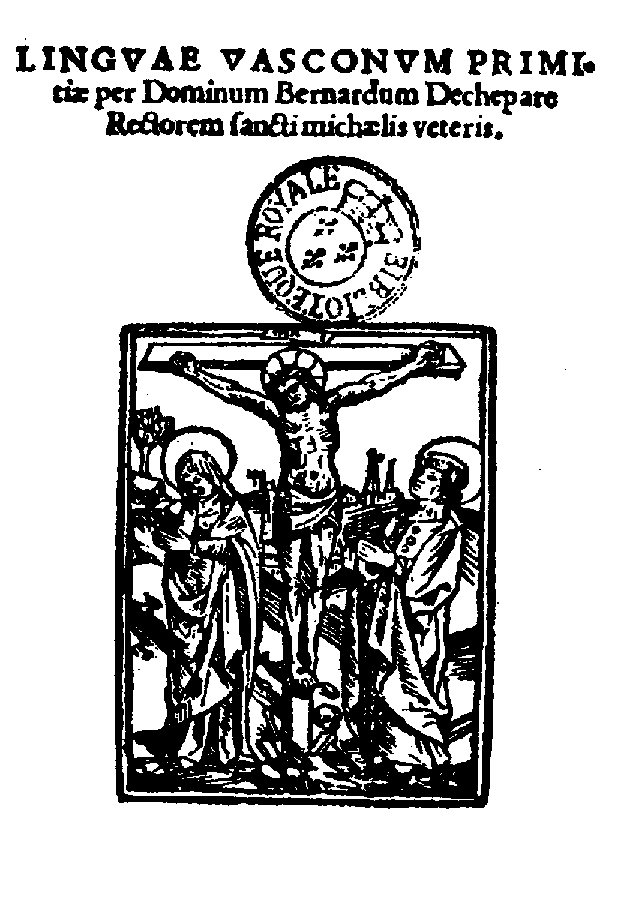
The title page of the Linguæ Vasconum Primitiæ

A few songs from the 16th century have survived, such as the Song of the Battle of Beotibar that deals with the battle fought in 1321 and a group of verses known as The Burning of Mondragón from the time of the Basque Clan Wars.

The earliest piece of prose written in Basque is a letter composed in 1537 by the Biscayan Juan de Zumárraga from Durango, the first bishop of Mexico.

Only a few years later in 1545, the first book known to have been put into print is published - a collection of poems fashioned by Bernard Etxepare, a priest from Lower Navarre in the Northern Basque Country, by the title Linguæ Vasconum Primitiæ ("Beginnings of the Basque Language"). In this book, Etxepare expresses his hopes that the first publication of a book in Basque will serve to invigorate the language and culture. His efforts were undoubtedly influenced by wider movements in Europe at the time that encouraged literary production in vernacular languages rather than Latin.

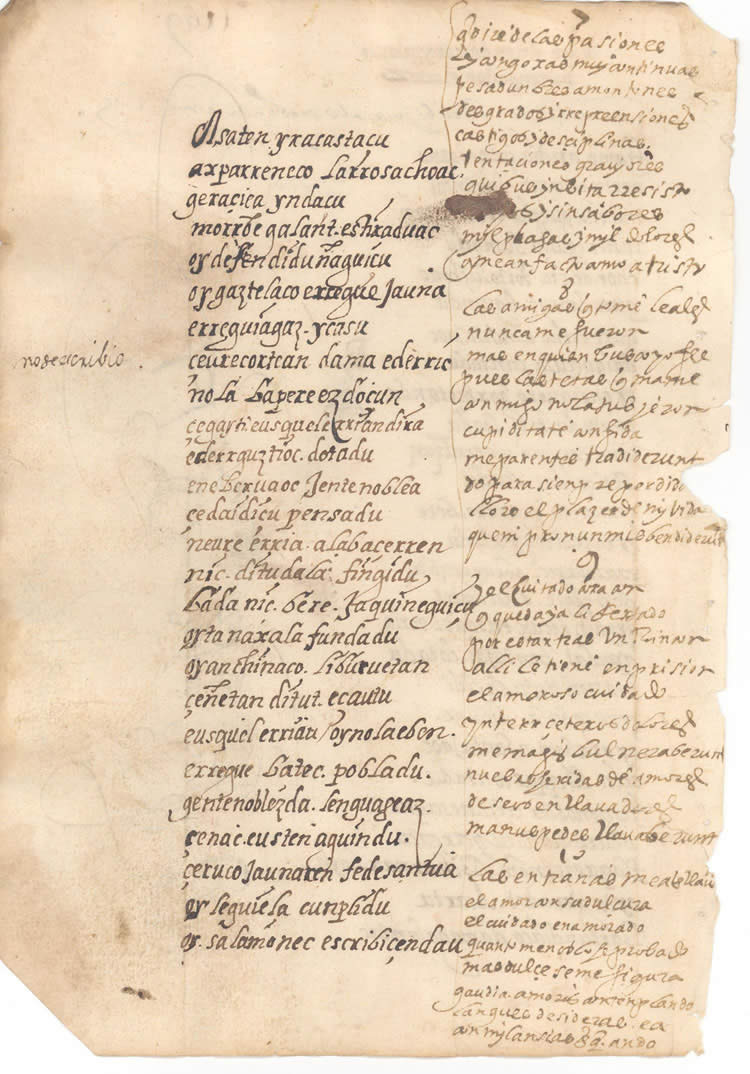
A page in Lazarraga's own handwriting

The next publication is a recently discovered pastoral play by Joan Perez de Lazarraga (1548?—1605) by the name of Silbero, Silbia, Doristeo and Sirena produced between 1564 and 1567 in Larrea, Alava, making it the earliest surviving play in Basque. With 102 pages (some damaged) it is also the longest early text.

1571 saw the publication of Joanes Leizarraga's New Testament translation into a standardised form of his Lapurdian dialect, promoted by Jeanne d'Albret, Queen of Navarre. He also wrote a small number of other religious works. Other similar books were to follow that aimed to convert the Basques to Protestantism.

The closing years of the 16th century see another publication, this time from the South, of a collection of proverbs written in the Biscayan dialect called Refranes y sentencias by an unknown author. However, by this time, the centre of Basque literary production had firmly established itself to the north of the Pyrenees, in Lower Navarre and the French provinces of Labourd and Soule, where it would remain for several centuries.

Although dialectal differences are clearly visible in these early texts, it is also clear that the differences in the 16th century were considerably smaller than they are today.

== The 17th century ==
In amongst the trickle of smaller religious works the Counter Reformation movement, which in the Basque Country had its centre in Sare, Soule, produced one of the most notable works of the 17th century, This was a religious publication, called Gero, the preachings of Pedro Agerre (better known as Axular) but in literary form, published in 1643. Although he was born in Urdax in Navarre and working in Soule, he wrote in Lapurdian, which by then had established itself as the most prestigious form of Basque.

Other important works of this century were:

- Dotrina christiana by Estève Materre in 1617, also one of the earliest known learners of Basque
- The works of Silvain Pouvreau, one of the earliest known learners of Basque. His works (some of which were published posthumously) include Giristinoaren Dotrina (Paris, 1656); Filotea (Paris, 1664); Gudu espirituala (Paris, 1665), Andre Dana Maria Privilegiatua (J. Vinson: 1892), Iesusen Imitacionea (1978, Hordago) and an unpublished but important dictionary.
- Arnauld de Oihenart, born 1592 in Mauléon, who was the first Basque layman to write in the language and who produced a large amount of poetry and an important collection of proverbs, the first of which was published in 1657 in Paris. His style of writing is still regarded as one of the highest in the history of Basque literature
- Liburuhauda Ixasoco nabigacionecoa, a book on marine navigation written by Martin de Hoyarzabal and translated by Piarres Detcheverry in 1677
- A book on farming techniques by Mongongo Dessança in 1692

Although Gipuzkoan and Biscayan enjoyed some status as literary dialects, Lapurdian was by far the most commonly used dialect of the 17th century.

== The 20th century ==
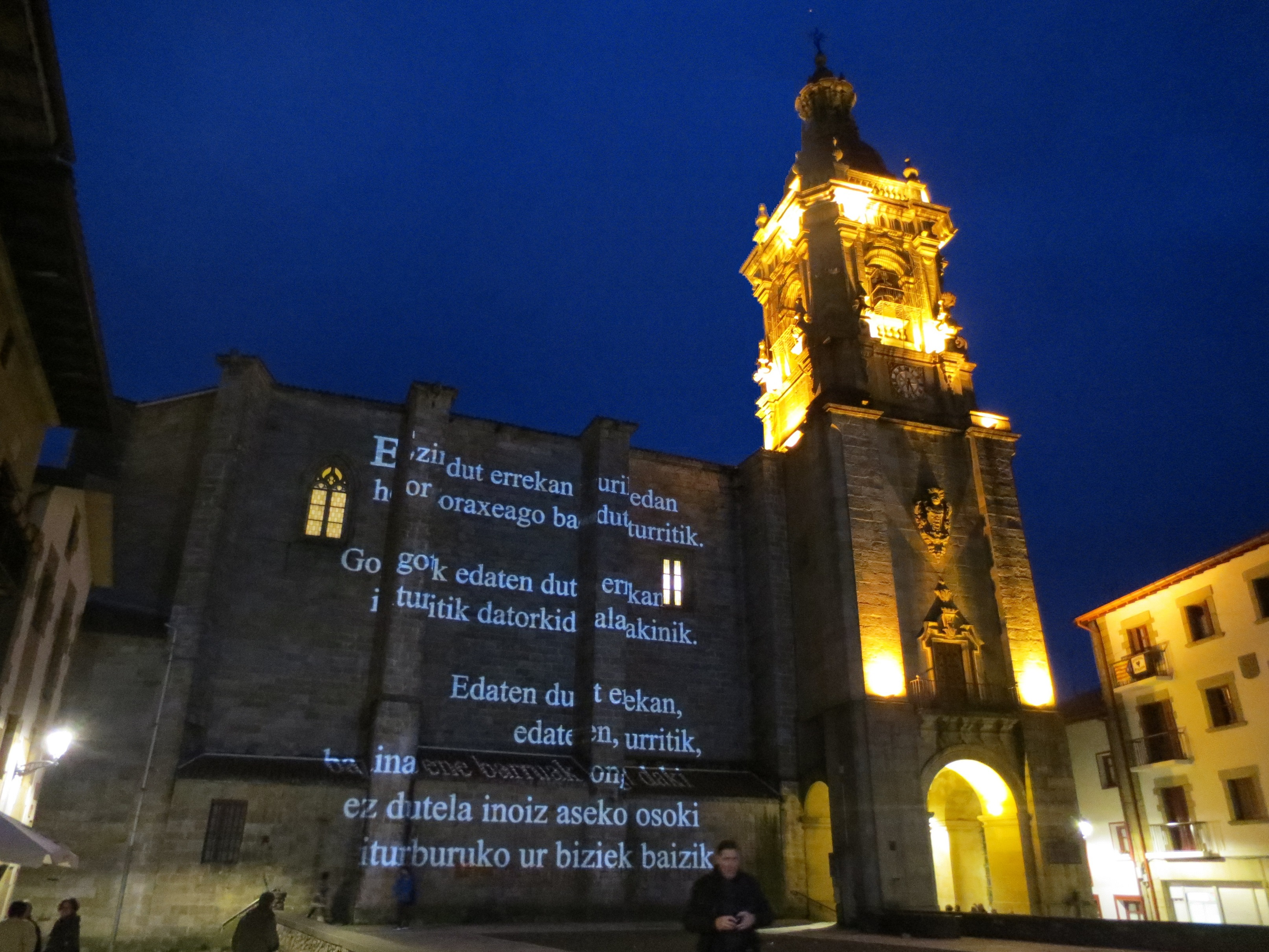
Poet J. Artze's poem projected on the wall of Usurbil's church (2018)

Some referential figures of 20th century Basque literature are Telesforo Monzon, Salbatore Mitxelena, Gabriel Aresti, Nikolas Ormaetxea, Txillardegi (pen name of José Luis Álvarez Enparantza), Joxe Azurmendi, Ramon Saizarbitoria, Bernardo Atxaga, or Joseba Sarrionandia. In addition, there are many Basque writers who have written in Spanish: Blas de Otero, and Gabriel Celaya.

In the 20th century, the Spanish Civil War halted all Basque cultural and literary production for almost two decades. The most-affected domain was that of language and the creation of texts in Basque. The bulk of Basque writers died or escaped to exile, where they undertook some attempts to revitalize literature by writing books or launching magazines of limited circulation.

However, some works were not even published during that period. In the Southern Basque Country, during the 1950s, new generations undertook efforts to write a new type of literature along European lines, innovating both in content and form, despite being heavily conditioned by Francoist censorship.

== Characteristics ==
The most typical traits of Basque literature during history have gradually shifted up to the present time. A number of consistent characteristics have been pinpointed, like the emphasis on folk, ethnological and mythological elements. Jon Kortazar underscores the "uncertainty between the epic sense and playfulness".

== Publishing ==
Between 1545 and 1974, 4,000 books were published in the Basque language, whereas between 1974 and 1995 12,500 were published. Modern Basque publishing began with the establishment of Elkar in 1972, a small publishing company based in Bayonne in the French Basque country. After the death of Franco, Elkar established a second publishing operation in San Sebastián in the Spanish Basque country. Although a number of other Basque publishing houses have been subsequently established, Elkar remains the largest.
