= Joseba Sarrionandia =

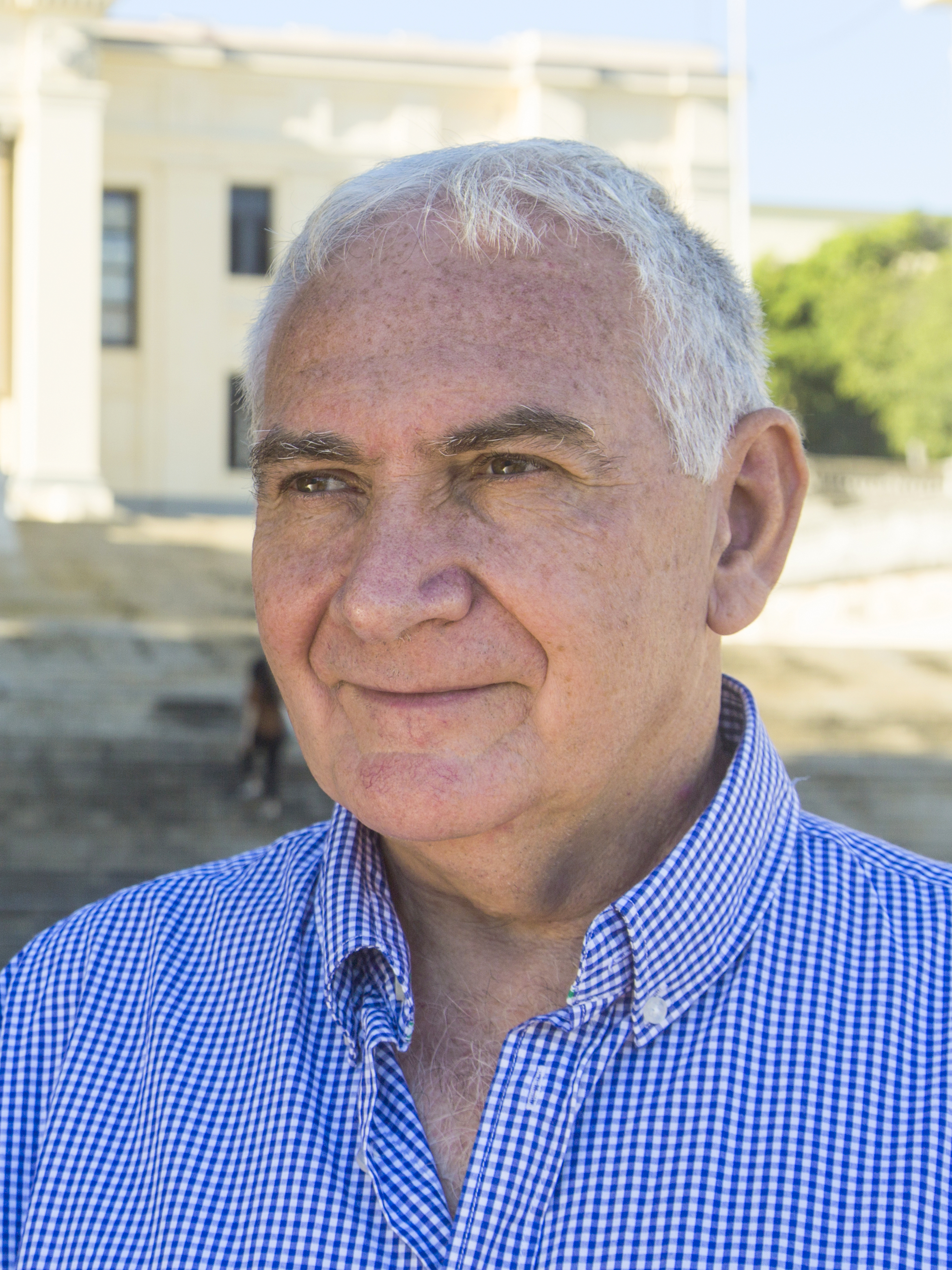
- Born: April 13, 1958 (age 68); Iurreta, Basque Autonomous Community, Spain
- Education: University of Deusto
- Occupations: writer; translator; philologist
- Writing career
- Pen name: Sarri
- Language: Basque
- Notable awards: Ignacio Aldekoa Prize (1980); Resurreccion Maria Azkue Prize (1980); Bilbao City Council Prize (1980); Spanish Literature critics', Basque Narrative Prize (1986 and 2001); Euskadi Prize for Essay in Basque (2011)

Joseba Sarrionandia Uribelarrea (Iurreta, Biscay, April 13, 1958) is a Basque writer who has published a large number of books of poetry and short stories, as well as novels. He has been awarded on numerous occasions for his work, and is nowadays a respected literary personality in the Basque Country.

In the early 80s, he was member of the Basque separatist group ETA. In 1985 he escaped from prison and since then he lived underground for decades while continuing to create and publish. In November 2016, it was revealed that he lives in Cuba, where he holds a position as lecturer at the University of Havana.

== Biography ==
He earned a Basque Philology PhD from the University of Deusto, Bilbao and started working as a Basque language teacher. He taught phonetics in the Bergara center of the UNED and also in the Udako Euskal Unibertsitatea and wrote pieces for Zeruko Argia, Anaitasuna, Jakin and Oh Euzkadi magazines. He started the Pott Banda group along with Bernardo Atxaga, Manu Ertzilla, Ruper Ordorika, Jon Juaristi and Joxemari Iturralde. He also created the Ibaizabal magazine. He worked with short narrations and also translated books, notably Samuel Taylor Coleridge's The Rime of the Ancient Mariner.

In 1980, while a member of ETA he was arrested by Spanish police and sentenced to 22 years in prison. Since then the realities of prison have appeared in his writings. In 1985 on San Fermin day (July 7) he escaped from prison with Iñaki Pikabea as there was a concert in the jail with Basque singer Imanol Larzabal. They hid themselves inside a loudspeaker. The Basque Radical Rock group Kortatu created the song Sarri, Sarri in honor of this. The escape was planned with theater critic Mikel Albisu, who would become the leader of ETA. During three months, the two fugitives and Antza were hiding in a flat in San Sebastián, before moving to France.

Since that day he has lived in secret and the topic of banishment/exile is foremost in his writing. In his novel Lagun Izoztua (in Basque The Frozen Friend) he writes about banishment. He has written books and poems which have been sung by different Basque singers as Jexuxmai Lopetegi, Mikel Laboa, Ruper Ordorika and Fermin Muguruza. There is also an audio book called Hau da ene ondasun guzia with his voice reading poems and many songs performed by different singers.

On 3 October 2011, he was awarded the Euskadi Prize for Essay in Basque for his work Moroak gara behelaino artean? (Are we Moors in the fog?) on the miseries of colonialism; however, the Basque Government withheld the prize sum of 18,000 euros until the author's status was resolved. On the same day, judges and lawyers interviewed by Cadena SER confirmed that Sarrionandia could not be prosecuted by Spanish law, as more than 20 years had passed since his original prison sentence and his escape. While terrorist acts have no time limit, the provision applies only if there was at least one victim. After a month and a half, the Spanish High Court confirmed to the Basque government that Sarrionandia was 'clean', with no criminal or civil liability. The prize amount was handed over to his family.

According to Spanish counter-terrorism sources, the writer has been hiding in Cuba. In 2014, he accepted the invitation of Mondragon University to give two lectures in Eskoriatza. It would have been his first public appearance since his escape in 1985. However, he cancelled the trip because he did not obtain the traveling permissions he needed. Even though the Cuban government has not acknowledged his presence, El Mundo reported in 2015 that Sarrionandia went to the Spanish consulate to regulate his status.

Bernardo Atxaga divided Sarrionandia's works in four distinct chronological phases. In the first phase, a young Sarrionandia wanted to be a part of Basque literature through a literary magazine. In the second phase, the imprisoned poet talked about suffering (La literatura y la revolución). In the third phase, after his escape, his themes were exile and homeland (Geografía, He llegado a casa casi a medianoche). In the current phase, "the brightest of them all," Sarrionandia is more serene, with a sense of humor and irony. Atxaga speculates on a fifth phase, based on the poem La vida ha llegado y tiene tus ojos, where the "life that has arrived" could be a child.

== Works ==
- Izuen gordelekuetan barrena (1981)
- Narrazioak (1983)
- Intxaur azal baten barruan. Eguberri amarauna (1983)
- Alkohola poemak (1984)
- Ni ez naiz hemengoa (1985)
- Atabala eta euria (1986)
- Marinel zaharrak (1987)
- Marginalia (1988)
- Ez gara gure baitakoak (1989)
- Izeba Mariasunen ipuinak (1989)
- Ainhoari gutunak (1990)
- Ifar aldeko orduak (1990)
- Gartzelako poemak (1992)
- Han izanik hona naiz (1992)
- Hnuy illa nyha majah yahoo (1995)
- Miopeak, bizikletak eta beste langabetu batzuk (1995)
- Hitzen ondoeza (1997)
- Hau da nire ondasun guzia (1999). This book is published in Basque, English, German, French and Spanish.
- Zitroi ur komikiak: Joseba Sarrionandia komikitan (2000)
- Lagun izoztua (2001)
- XX. mendeko poesia kaierak: Joseba Sarrionandia (2002)
- Kolosala izango da (2003)
- Akordatzen (2004)
- Harrapatutako txorien hegalak (2005)
- Munduko zazpi herrialdetako ipuinak (2008)
- Gau ilunekoak (2008)
- Idazlea zeu zara, irakurtzen duzulako (2010)
- Moroak gara behelaino artean? (2010)
- Narrazio guztiak (1979–1990) (2011)
- Durangoko Azoka 1965-2015 (2015)
- Lapur banden etika ala politika (2015)
- Hilda dago poesia? ¿La poesía está muerta? (2016)

== Prizes and recognition ==
- Ignacio Aldekoa Prize (1980)
- Resurreccion Maria Azkue Prize (1980)
- Bilbao City Council Prize (1980)
- Spanish Literature critics', Basque Narrative Prize, 1986, for Atabala eta euria (The Drum and the Rain)
- Spanish Literature critics', Basque Narrative Prize, 2001, for Lagun izoztua (The Frozen Friend)
- Euskadi Prize for Essay in Basque (2011)
