= Agerre =

Agerre is a Basque surname. Notable people with the surname include:

- Jose Agerre (1889–1962), Basque writer and politician
- Pedro Agerre (1556–1644), Basque writer
