= Txillardegi =

Spanish linguist, politician, and writer (1929–2012)

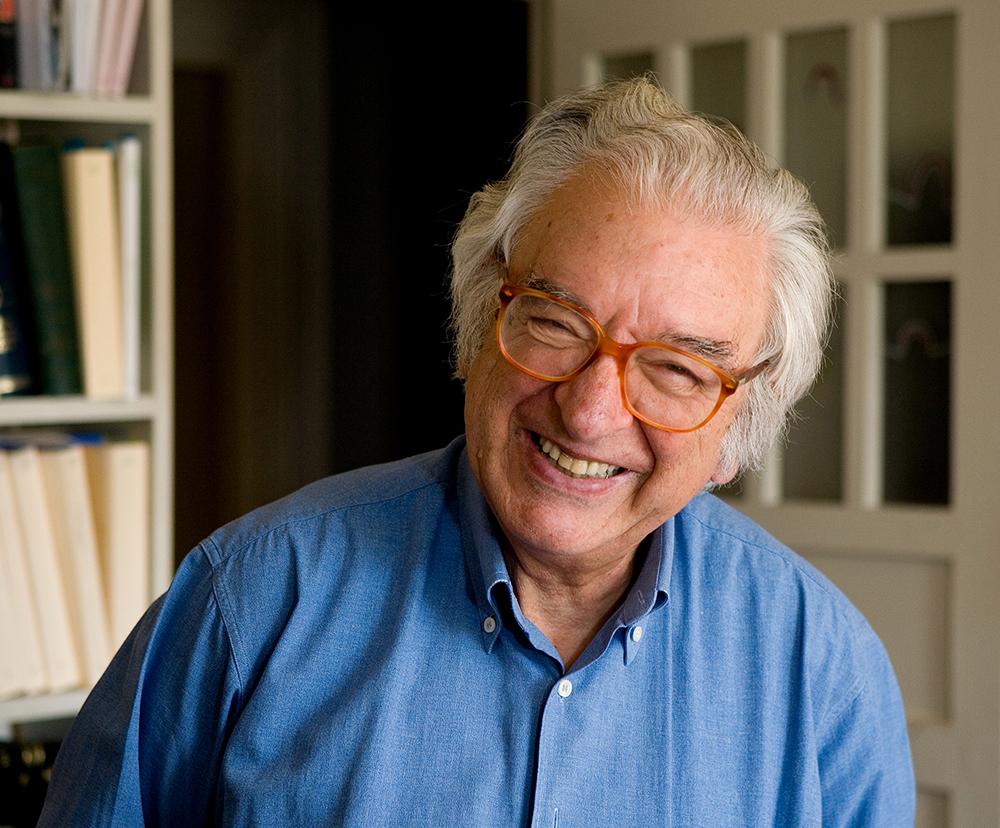
- Txillardegi in 2008
- Born: José Luis Álvarez Enparantza; 27 September 1929; San Sebastián (Donostia), Spain
- Died: 14 January 2012 (aged 82); San Sebastián (Donostia), Spain
- Occupations: Linguist, politician, and writer
- Writing career
- Language: Basque
- Genres: Novel, Essay
- Subjects: Standard Basque, Basque nationalism
- Notable works: Leturiaren egunkari ezkutua (1957); Huntaz eta hartaz (1965); Hizkuntza eta pentsakera (1972); Euskal Herria helburu (1994)

José Luis Álvarez Enparantza (27 September 1929 – 14 January 2012), better known by his pseudonym Txillardegi, was a Basque linguist, politician, and writer. He was born and raised in the Basque Country, and although he did not learn the Basque language until the age of 17, he later came to be considered one of the most influential figures in Basque nationalism and culture in the second half of the 20th century. He was one of the founders of ETA, but in 1967 he left because he did not agree with its political line.

== Literary and academic work ==
Álvarez Enparantza (the maternal surname was sometimes Hispanicised as Emparanza) studied engineering at the University of Bilbao, and linguistics at the University of Paris. In 1957, he became a corresponding member of the Euskaltzaindia (Academia de la Lengua Vasca, Academy of the Basque Language), which adopted most of his proposals on the orthography and morphology of Standard Basque. In 1993 he became a member of its Commission on Pronunciation. His name was put forward twice to become a full member of the Euskaltzaindia but he was turned down for political reasons. When he was going to be proposed for a third time, he himself turned down the proposal.

He was a major contributor to the standardisation of Basque. His philosophy was based on the following points:

- that if minority languages are to survive, they have to be able to deal with modern science and technology;
- that a standardised language is a key part of modernisation;
- that any subject could be discussed in an understandable way in any language, based on "trying, time, and intelligence";
- and that the main feature, among others, that should identify a person (or the country) as Basque should be knowledge of the Basque language.

Video highlighting the philosophical contributions made by Txillardegi (English subtitles)

He was also a well-known writer and linguist under the pseudonyms Larresoro, Igara and Usako. He was a writer influenced by existentialism of Kierkegaard, Unamuno and Sartre, and also by the writer Bertrand Russell. He has had many books published, mostly to do with the Basque language and its grammar. He has also written novels and political essays. His work Leturiaren egunkari ezkutua (1957) is considered the first modern novel written in Basque and makes a clear dividing line in Basque literature. Other work included the novels Haizeaz bestaldetik (1979) and Putzu (1999); the influential essays Huntaz eta hartaz (1965), Hizkuntza eta pentsakera (1972) and Euskal Herria helburu (1994), and the academic works Euskal fonologia (1980), Euskal azentuaz (1984) and Elebidun gizartearen azterketa matematikoa (1984).

In 1968 he won the Txomin Agirre award for his novel Elsa Scheelen. He also won the Andima award in Caracas in 1969 for books on teaching mathematics. He won the Silver Lauburu for his book Euskal Gramatika in Bilbo in 1980.

In the 1970s Txillardegi co-founded the Euskal Herrian Euskaraz Basque language movement. In 1982 he began lecturing in the University of the Basque Country, of which he later became a professor emeritus.

The database of the Basque scientific-intellectual community Inguma shows references to 122 products (paper, books, talks etc.) created by Txillardegi.

== Political activity ==
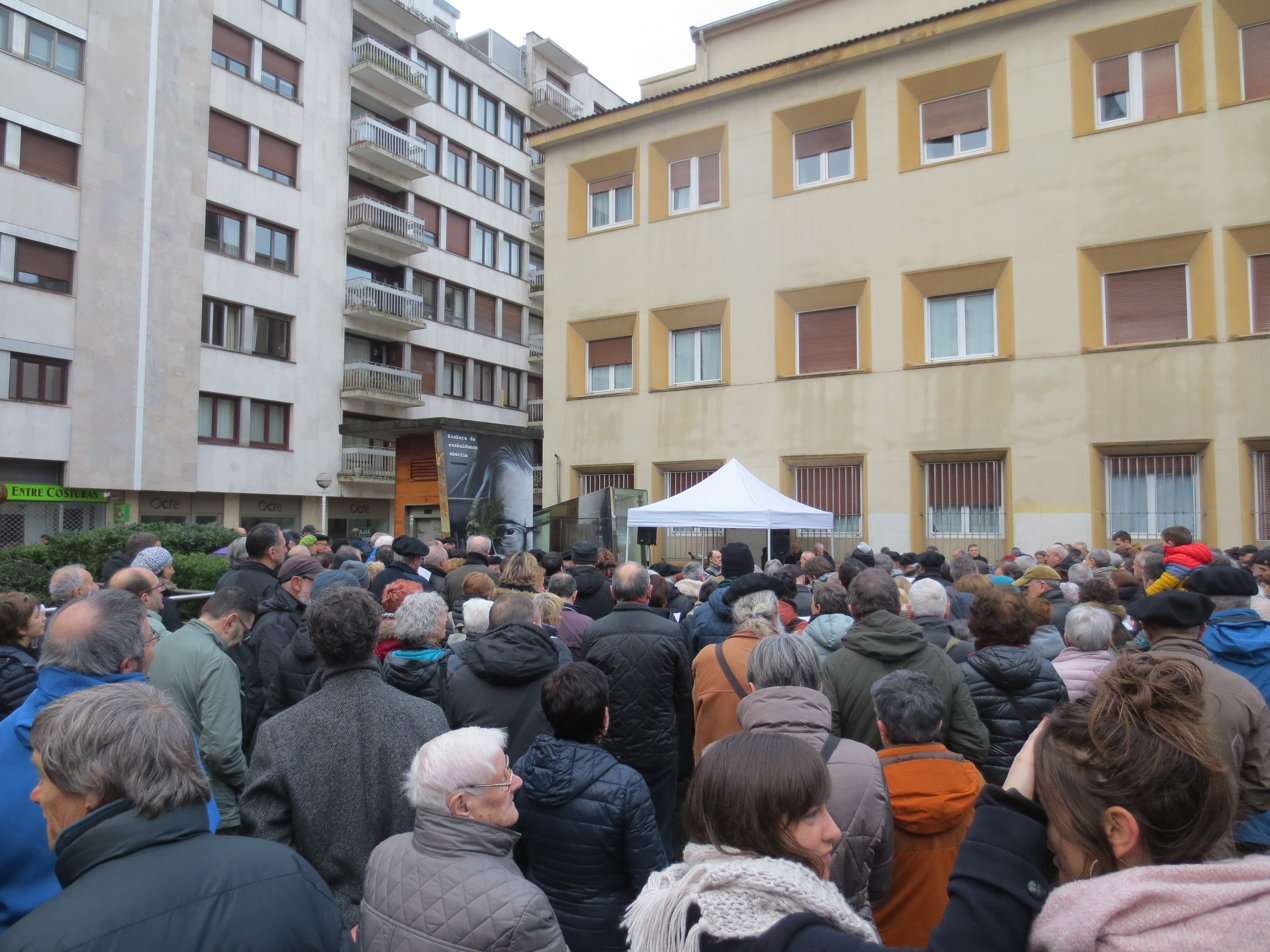
Tribute to Txillardegi on his death's 6th anniversary

A member of the Basque Nationalist Party (PNV) in his youth, he promoted the defence and study of the Basque language as the basis of Basque identity.

After becoming disillusioned with the PNV, Txillardegi was one of the founders of ETA in 1959, together with a group of young nationalists and was the visible leader of the cultural branch of the movement. In 1961 he fled into exile, in Paris and Brussels, returning in 1967. In 1976 he and Iñaki Aldekoa formed a political party, the Euskal Sozialista Biltzarrea (ESB: Congreso de Socialistas Vascos, Basque Socialist Congress).

Txillardegi participated in the foundation in 1977 of Herri Batasuna and was elected senator for the abertzale coalition in the first elections.

Coming to believe that the armed struggle was unviable, for a time he was active in Aralar. In the general elections of 2008, he announced his Senate candidacy for the Eusko Abertzale Ekintza party (Acción Nacionalista Vasca, Basque Nationalist Action) for the precinct of Guipúzcoa.

== Sources ==
- Aizpuru, Alaitz 2012: "Existentzialismoaren hastapenak Euskal Herrian: Leturiaren egunkari ezkutua" in Alaitz Aizpuru(koord.), Euskal Herriko pentsamenduaren gida, Bilbo, UEU. ISBN 978-84-8438-435-9
- Azurmendi, Joxe 1999: Txillardegiren saioa: hastapenen bila, Jakin, 114: 17–45.
- Azurmendi, Joxe 2000: "Kierkeggard-en <<egunkari ezkutua>>" in Txipi Ormaetxea (arg.), Txillardegi lagun giroan, Bilbo: UEU ISBN 84-8438-007-6
- Hegats. Literatur aldizkaria. 49. ISSN 1130-2445
- Olaziregi, Mari Jose 2012. Basque Literary History, Reno, Center for Basque Studies/University of Nevada ISBN 978-1-935709-19-0
- Sudupe, Pako 2011: 50eko hamarkadako euskal literatura I: hizkuntza eta ideologia, Donostia, Utriusque Vasconiae. ISBN 978-84-938329-4-0
- Sudupe, Pako 2011: 50eko hamarkadako euskal literatura II: kazetaritza eta siakera, Donostia, Utriusque Vasconiae. ISBN 978-84-938329-5-7
- Sudupe, Pako 2012: "Ideologia eztabaidak 50eko hamarkadan" in Alaitz Aizpuru (koord.), Euskal Herriko pentsamenduaren gida, Bilbo, UEU. ISBN 978-84-8438-435-9
- Sudupe, Pako 2016: Txillardegiren borroka abertzalea, Donostia: Elkar ISBN 978-84-9027-544-3
- Sudupe, Pako 2025: "Orixe, Gandiaga, R. Arregi eta Txillardegi" in XX. mendeko euskal pentsamendua Joxe Azurmendiren talaiatik, Leioa, EHU. ISBN 978-84-9860-927-1
- Torrealdai, Joan Mari 2014: Batasunaren bidea urratzen. Txillardegiren eragintza praktikoa, Jakin, 204:11-96.
- Zapiain, Markos 2000: "Txillardegi gazte eroaren heriotza eta egia" in Txipi Ormaetxea (arg.), Txillardegi lagun giroan, Bilbo: UEU. ISBN 84-8438-007-6
- Zapiain, Markos 2024: Txillardegi hizkuntzalari, Donostia, Elkar. ISBN 978-8413604473
