= Basque alphabet =

Latin-based alphabet

The Basque alphabet is a Latin alphabet used to write the Basque language. It consists of 27 letters.

== List of letters ==
The letters of the Basque alphabet are the 26 letters of the ISO basic Latin alphabet plus ⟨ñ⟩. The letter ⟨ç⟩ is officially not considered a separate letter, but a variant of ⟨c⟩.

This is the whole list, plus their corresponding phonemes in IPA:

Letter	Basque name	Pronunciation
A	a	/a/
B	be	/b/, [β̞]
C	ze*	/s̻/, /k/
(Ç)	(ze hautsia*)	(/s/)
D	de	/d̪/, [ð̞]
E	e	/e/
F	efe	/f/
G	ge	/ɡ/, [ɣ̞]
H	hatxe	∅, /ɦ/
I	i	/i/, /i̭/
J	jota	/j/, /x/, /ʝ/, /ɟ/
K	ka	/k/
L	ele	/l/
M	eme	/m/
N	ene	/n/
Ñ	eñe	/ɲ/
O	o	/o/
P	pe	/p/
Q	ku*	/k/
R	erre	/r/, /ɾ/
S	ese	/s̺/
T	te	/t̪/
U	u	/u/, /u̯/
V	uve*	/b/, [β̞]
W	uve bikoitza*	/u̯/
X	ixa	/ʃ/
Y	i grekoa*	/i/, /i̭/, /j/
Z	zeta	/s̻/
* Although ⟨c, ç, q, v, w, y⟩ are not used in traditional Basque language words, they were included in the Basque alphabet for writing loanwords.

All letters and digraphs represent unique phonemes. The main exception is if ⟨l, n, t⟩ are preceded by ⟨i⟩; most dialects palatalize the sound into /ʎ/, /ɲ/ and /c/ even if that is not written.

⟨h⟩ is silent in most regions but is pronounced in much of the Northeast, which is the main reason for its existence in the Basque alphabet. It doesn't even represent syllable breaks in the other dialects, although it can stop the aforementioned palatalization from taking place in some words, for example the ⟨n⟩ in Ainhoa.

== Digraphs ==
There are several digraphs (successive letters used to represent a single sound):

digraph	sound
⟨dd⟩	/ɟ/
⟨ll⟩	/ʎ/
⟨rr⟩	/r/
⟨ts⟩	/t͡s̺/
⟨tt⟩	/c/
⟨tx⟩	/t͡ʃ/
⟨tz⟩	/t͡s̻/

== History ==
For most of its history, Basque writers used the conventions of Romance languages like Spanish or French. Thus Pedro Agerre's 1643 book was titled Guero corresponding to modern gero ("Later") and the 18th-century motto Irurac bat would be Hirurak bat ("The three as one"). In the late 19th century the nationalist politician Sabino Arana proposed several changes, including new letters such as ⟨ĺ⟩ and ⟨ŕ⟩ that were not accepted in the standard orthography. Resurrección María de Azkue's Basque dictionary used also an idiosyncratic spelling with ⟨ã d̃ ẽ ĩ l̃ ñ õ s̃ t̃ ũ x̃⟩.

The present-day Standard Basque was developed in the second half of the 20th century, and has been set by rules of Euskaltzaindia (the Basque Language Academy). Regarding the alphabet, the main criticism by Biscayan and Gipuzkoan traditionalists targeted the ⟨h⟩, as the orthography ruled by Euskaltzaindia used it in several words that those traditionalists wrote without this letter, which is silent both in Biscay and Gipuzkoa — whereas it was pronounced in all Basque dialects some centuries ago and still is pronounced in much of the Northeast. On the other hand, Basque speakers of the Northeast had to learn to write several words with fewer or no ⟨h⟩ letters, because usually a ⟨h⟩ used in their tradition was not taken into the Standard Basque orthography. These changes from the various traditions into the modern Standard Basque were proposed and accepted by the young generations of Basque writers, so the ⟨h⟩ controversy faded as the older generations died.

== Letter frequencies ==
In a sample of 135,878,500 characters, the most common letter in Basque is ⟨a⟩ and the least common is ⟨ç⟩. Note that ⟨ü⟩ is treated as a variant of ⟨u⟩ and is not considered to be a separate letter of the Basque alphabet.

The letter ⟨ü⟩ is used:

1. In the Suletin (Zuberoan) dialect of Basque.

2. In standard Basque, it is used in geographical names from the Suletin dialect, e. g. Garrüze 'Garris, Pyrénées-Atlantiques', and their derivatives, e. g. garrüztar 'inhabitant of Garris'.

Basque Letter Frequencies
Letter	Frequency
a	14.1%
b	2.57%
c	0.253%
ç	0.00137%
d	2.82%
e	12.5%
f	0.456%
g	1.95%
h	1.13%
i	8.40%
j	0.270%
k	5.13%
l	2.92%
m	1.41%
n	7.80%
ñ	0.0109%
o	4.96%
p	1.22%
q	0.0151%
r	7.45%
s	2.49%
t	7.12%
u	4.36%
ü	0.00251%
v	0.114%
w	0.0390%
x	0.499%
y	0.0870%
z	4.59%

When contrasting to Spanish or French, although some unfrequent letters are used in common words (⟨ñ⟩ for proper names like Begoña, Iñaki or Iruña), some others are "replaced" by an alternative. That's the case of when ⟨v⟩ is seen in Romance languages, which would be "changed" to ⟨b⟩ like in probintzia, "province" (even after ⟨n⟩: pinpilinpauxa). Samewise, Romance ⟨q(u)⟩ or ⟨c⟩ are expressed by ⟨k⟩, ⟨w⟩ by ⟨u⟩ or ⟨b⟩, and ⟨y⟩ by ⟨i⟩. The most surprising case could be when ⟨f⟩ is expected, which is changed to ⟨p⟩ (Pernando for Fernando, somehow still reflecting Old Basque lacking /f/). This looks valid even for some Latin words where Spanish lost the initial ⟨f⟩ like ficus, "fig" (Spanish "higo") which is piku, and fagus, "beech" (Spanish "haya") evolved into pago, or even for the voiced counterpart /v/ in Latin vulture, which became the /p/ of putre. Logically, this direct equivalents are a matter of deeper discusion depending on phonetics, and the time (modern or old) or language of borrowing (Latin, Early Romance, Spanish, French or other languages).
