= Ruper Ordorika =

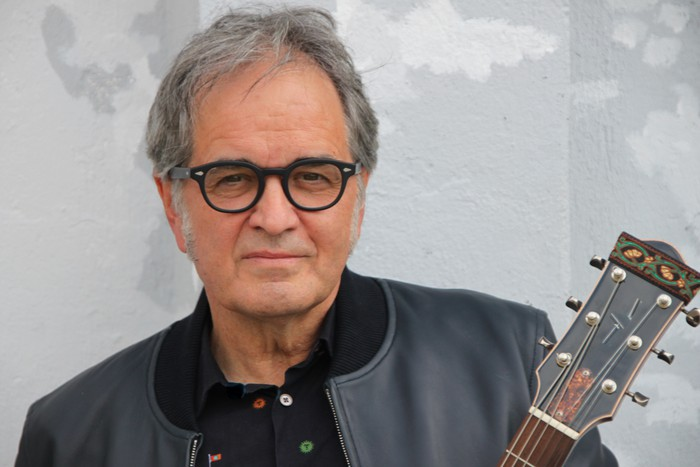
- Ruper Ordorika with his guitar.

Background information
- Born: 1956 (age 69–70); Oñati, Gipuzkoa, Basque Country, Spain
- Genres: Folk, Rock, Folk rock
- Occupation: Singer-songwriter
- Instruments: Vocals, guitar
- Years active: 1980–present
- Labels: Elkar, Nuevos Medios, Esan Ozenki, Metak
- Website: www.ruperordorika.com

Ruper Ordorika, born at Oñati (Gipuzkoa) on 16 August 1956, is a Basque singer-songwriter. He is generally considered one of the greatest renewers of basque songwriting. He was part of the literary group Pott, with, among others, writers Joseba Sarrionandia, Bernardo Atxaga, J.M. Iturralde.

== Discography ==
=== Albums ===
- Hautsi Da Anphora (Xoxoa-Elkar, 1980)
- Ni Ez Naiz Noruegako Errege (Elkar, 1983)
- Bihotzerreak (Elkar, 1985)
- Ez Da Posible (Gasa-Wea, 1990)
- So'Ik'So (Nuevos Medios, 1995)
- Dabilen Harria (Nuevos Medios, 1998)
- Gaur (Esan Ozenki, 2000)
- Hurrengo Goizean (Metak, 2001)
- Kantuok Jartzen Ditut (Metak, 2003)
- Memoriaren Mapan (Elkar, 2006)
- Hamar t'erdietan (Elkar, 2008)
- Haizea Garizumakoa (Elkar, 2009)
- Hodeien azpian (Elkar, 2011).
- Azukre koxkorrak (Elkar, 2013).
- Lurrean etzanda (Elkar, 2014).
- Lurrean etzanda (Elkar, 2014).
- Guria Ostatuan (Elkar, 2016).
- Bakarka (Elkar, 2018).
- Kafe Antzokian (Elkar, 2019).
- Amour et toujours (Elkar, 2021).
- Lurra ikutu barik (Elkar, 2025).

=== Singles/EPs ===
- Ruper Ordorika & Mugalaris (Emak Bakia, 1992)

=== Albums with Hiru Truku ===
- Hiru Truku (Nuevos Medios, 1994)
- Hiru Truku II (Nuevos Medios, 1997)
- Nafarroako Kantu Zaharrak (Metak, 2004)
