= Jakin =

Jakin may refer to:

- Jakin, Georgia, a city in the state of Georgia (United States)
- Jakin (magazine), a Basque-language magazine
- Alo Jakin, an Estonian cyclist
- Godomey, a town and arrondissement in Benin that used to be known as Jakin
