= Jon Mirande =

Basque writer, poet and translator

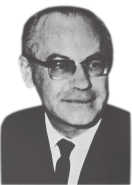
- Born: October 11, 1925; Paris, France
- Died: December 28, 1972 (aged 47); Paris, France
- Resting place: Cimetière parisien de Thiais
- Education: Lycée Arago
- Occupations: Linguist, translator, poet and writer
- Writing career
- Pen name: Jon Chaho
- Language: French; Spanish; English; Basque; Cornish; Breton

Jon Mirande (11 October 1925 – 28 December 1972) was a Basque writer, poet and translator who lived in Paris. Mirande exerted a great literary influence in the 1970s and 1980s, writing in Basque literary and cultural magazines as well as Breton ones. He wrote poetry and short stories in his youth, and essays and novels in his later years. Mirande was a nationalist and believed in the value of ethnicity, especially in the Basque language, but he was also pagan and laid claim to the values of paganism and of the ancient Basques.

Mirande managed to incorporate Basque poetry into the modern European poetry landscape through an aestheticism of symbolist characteristics indebted to Charles Baudelaire and Edgar Allan Poe. In his poetic works, Mirande covered topics never before dealt with by Basque poetry: prostitution, alcohol, pedophilic sex and so on.

== Sources ==
- Altzibar, Xabier (2012). "The Essay in Basque" in Mari Jose Olaziregi (ed.), Basque Literary History, Reno, Center for Basque Studies/University of Nevada, pp. 276–77.
- Azurmendi, Joxe (1978). Mirande eta kristautasuna, GAK.
- Azurmendi, Joxe (1989). Schopenhauer, Nietzsche, Spengler, Miranderen pentsamenduan, Susa.
- Azurmendi, Joxe (1989). Miranderen pentsamendua, Susa.
- Azurmendi, Joxe (1997). The democrats and the violent. Mirande's critique of the French revolution
- Azurmendi, Joxe (1998). Mirande, berriro, Jakin, 106: 31–46
- Otaegi, Lourdes (2012). "Modern Basque Poetry" in Mari Jose Olaziregi (ed.), Basque Literary History, Reno, Center for Basque Studies/University of Nevada, pp. 213–14.
- Soto, Mikel (2025): Mirande. Herriminez, ezin-minez, Aduna, Elkar. ISBN 978-84-1360-482-4
- Sudupe, Pako 2011: 50eko hamarkadako euskal literatura I. Hizkuntza eta ideologia eztabaidak, Donostia, Utriusque Vasconiae. ISBN 978-84-938329-4-0
- Sudupe, Pako 2011: 50eko hamarkadako euskal literatura II. Kazetaritza eta saiakera, Donostia, Utriusque Vasconiae. ISBN 978-84-938329-5-7
