= Manuel Saez =

Manuel Saez may refer to:

- Manuel Sáez (born 1961), Spanish artist
- Manuel Martín Sáez, Chilean minister of the economy under Pinochet
- Manuel Saez (industrial designer) (born 1973), Argentine designer
