= Obabakoak =

1988 novel by Bernardo Atxaga

- First edition (Basque)
- Author: Bernardo Atxaga
- Translator: Margaret Jull Costa
- Language: Basque
- Publisher: Erein
- Publication date: 1988
- Publication place: Spain
- English publication date: 1992
- Pages: 402
- ISBN: 8475682189

Obabakoak is a 1988 novel by the Basque writer Bernardo Atxaga. The title can be translated as "Stories from Obaba". The book won the National Literature Prize for Narrative. It is the most internationally successful book in Basque and has been translated into numerous languages. The original Basque version was published by Editorial Erein in 1988, and the author's own Spanish version was published by Ediciones B in 1989. An English translation by Margaret Jull Costa based on the Spanish version was published in 1992.

== Contents ==
- Childhoods
  - Esteban Werfell
  - An exposition of Canon Lizardi's letter
  - Post tenebras spero lucem
  - If I could, I'd go out for a stroll every night: I. Katharina's statement
  - If I could, I'd go out for a stroll every night: II. Marie's statement
- Nine words in honour of the village of Villamediana
- In search of the last word
  - Young and green
  - The rich merchant's servant
  - Regarding stories
  - Dayoub, the rich merchant's servant
  - Mr Smith
  - Maiden name, Laura Sligo
  - Finis coronat opus
  - In the morning
  - Hans Menscher
  - How to write a story in five minutes
  - Klaus Hanhn
  - Marggarete and Heinrich, twins
  - I, Jean Baptiste Hargous
  - How to plagiarise
  - The crevasse
  - A Rhine wine
  - Samuel Telleria Uribe
  - Wei Lie Deshang
  - X and Y
  - The torch
- By way of an autobiography

== Themes ==
Atxaga described the idea behind the village Obaba: "Obaba is an interior landscape. You don't remember all the places of the past, but what sticks in the memory is this window, that stone, the bridge. Obaba is the country of my past, a mixture of the real and the emotional."

== Reception ==
Maggie Traugott of The Independent wrote: "Atxaga loves parody, riddles, manipulating texts within texts, which could of course all turn pretentious and hard-going if it weren't handled with charm and dexterity." Traugott wrote that the Basque language "has been 'hiding away like a hedgehog', fortifying itself largely on an oral tradition. Atxaga has not only awakened the hedgehog, but has brought it into the context of his own wide and idiosyncratic reading of world literature."

== See also ==
- 1988 in literature
- Basque literature
