= Joxe Azurmendi =

Basque writer (1941–2025)

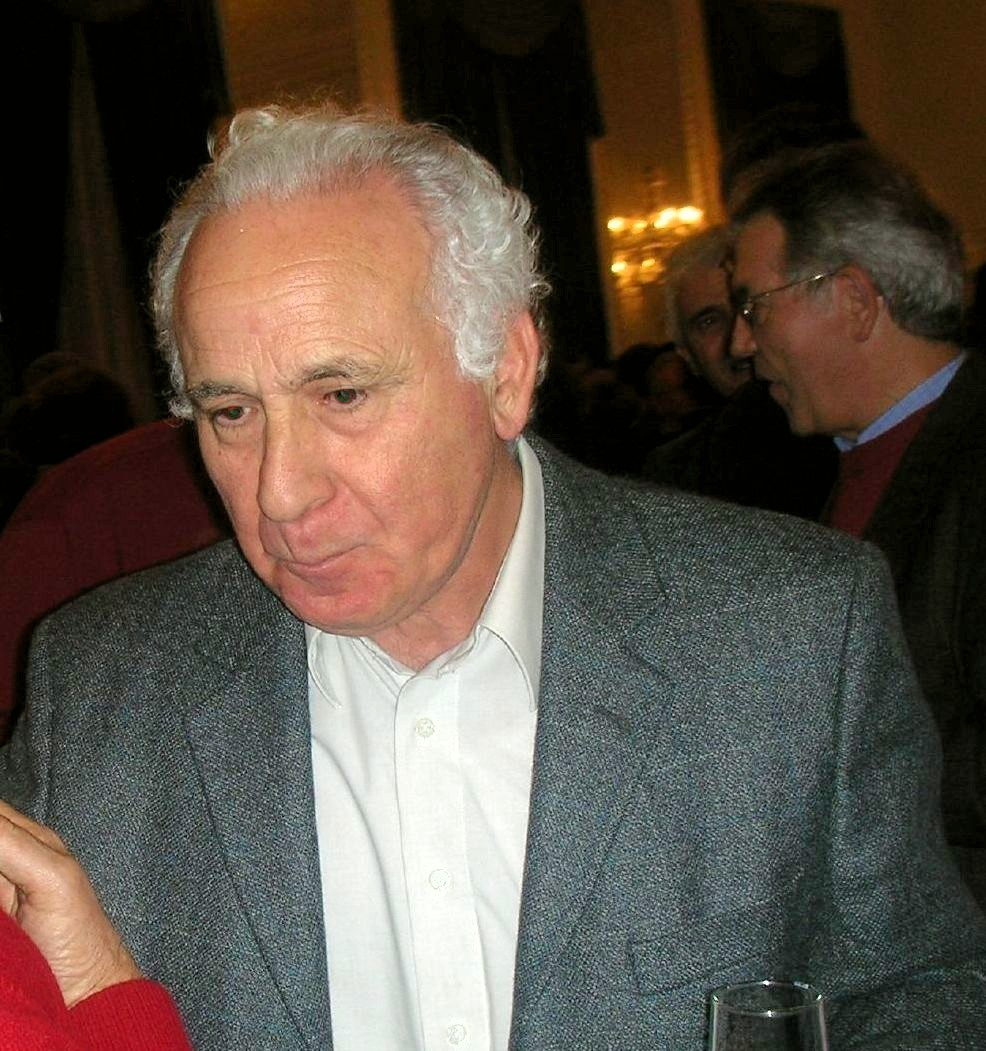
- Azurmendi in 2006
- Born: 19 March 1941; Zegama, Spain
- Died: 1 July 2025 (aged 84); San Sebastián, Spain

Education
- Education: University of the Basque Country, University of Münster

Philosophical work
- Era: Contemporary philosophy
- Region: Western philosophy
- School: Continental philosophy Relativism
- Main interests: Modernity, Age of Enlightenment, Rationalism, Romanticism, social philosophy, political philosophy, philosophical anthropology, philosophy of language, ethics, nationalism, Basque literature
- Notable ideas: The State as secular church, morality as a political weapon

Joxe Azurmendi Otaegi (19 March 1941 – 1 July 2025) was a Spanish Basque writer, philosopher, essayist and poet. He published numerous articles and books on ethics, politics, the philosophy of language, technique, Basque literature and philosophy in general.

Azurmendi was member of Jakin and the director of Jakin irakurgaiak, a publishing house which has published over 40 books under his management. He also collaborated with the Klasikoak publishing firm in the Basque translations of various philosophical works and was one of the founders of Udako Euskal Unibertsitatea (The Basque Summer University). He has been Professor of Modern Philosophy and a lecturer at Euskal Herriko Unibertsitatea (The University of the Basque Country). In 2010 he was awarded the title "honorary academic" by Euskaltzaindia (The Basque Language Academy).

He was an intellectual who studied the problem more than the solution. Azurmendi's essays cover modern European topics in great depth and knowledge. He has incorporated the philosophy and thinking of European thinkers, especially German ones. He often adopted a polemic tone.

Azurmendi was, in the opinion of many, one of the most prolific and erudite thinkers in the Basque Country.

== Background ==
Joxe Azurmendi studied philosophy and theology at The University of the Basque Country, Rome and the University of Münster.

At the beginning of the 1960s, he joined the cultural movement which grew up around the magazine Jakin, and was in fact the director of the publication when it was prohibited for the first time by Franco's regime. He has collaborated closely and uninterruptedly with the magazine since its restoration. In that publication, he has raised the problems of Basque society in the context of European thinkers. During the early 1970s, he focused his attention on disseminating basic literature in the Basque language on subjects which were being hotly debated at the time in the Basque Country: nationhood, socialism, internationalism, aesthetic autonomy etc. In the 1980s, he began teaching at The University of the Basque Country, and in 1984 he submitted his thesis on Jose Maria Arizmendiarrieta, the founder of the Mondragon cooperative movement, in which he argued that Arizmendiarrieta's project aimed to unite individuals and society under an organisation which combined both socialism and French personalism.

He was a visiting scholar at the University of Cologne, the University of Padua and the Ruhr University Bochum where he spent several months each year from the 1980s until his retirement. He retired in 2011 and was appointed professor emeritus of the University of the Basque Country.

In 1992, he published what was to become his best-known work: Espainolak eta euskaldunak (The Spanish and the Basques). The work, published by Elkar, was written in response to a text by Sánchez-Albornoz which claimed that "The Basques are the last people to be civilised in Spain; they have a thousand years less civilisation than any other people ... They are rough, simple people who nevertheless consider themselves to be the children of God and the heirs to his glory. But they are really nothing more than un-Romanised Spaniards." Azurmendi's essay refuted and dismantled the stereotypes maintained about the Basques by certain Spanish intellectuals.

It was on the threshold of the new millennium, however, that Azurmendi's work reached its height. During the early years of the 21st century, he published the trilogy formed by Espainiaren arimaz (About the soul of Spain) (2006, Elkar), Humboldt. Hizkuntza eta pentsamendua (Humboldt. Language and Thought) (2007, UEU) and Volksgeist. Herri gogoa (Volksgeist. National Character) (2008, Elkar). In this trilogy, Joxe Azurmendi reveals some of his most significant thinking.

In 2009, Azurmendi published his most personal work, Azken egunak Gandiagarekin (The last days with Gandiaga), where he reflected on different forms of rationality within philosophy of science, philosophy of religion and philosophical anthropology. The main thesis he defended was that scientific rationality has left us without the necessary language to deal with the meaning of life.

Azurmendi died in San Sebastián on 1 July 2025, at the age of 84. According to his wishes, there was no wake or public funeral.

== Philosophical work ==
Video highlighting the philosophical contributions made by Azurmendi (English subtitles)

All of Azurmendi's philosophical work was a defense of freedom of thought and conscience. The Human-Animal is one of the basic categories developed to carry out his work. This concept unified his thought, which was not a closed system. His work emerged and developed during a period marked by a crisis of culture, politics and values. But it was a crisis that he understood not as something negative, but rather something that opened up a whole new range of possibilities. Consequently, all his thinking was centred around the defence of freedom in every field, but especially in relation to conscience and thinking.

Far from fleeing the crisis, then, his work tries to outline how we can live in this situation. To this end, he adopts a relativist perspective, and given that modernity has left us with no solid base, he fights against the last vestiges of the dogmatism towards which our society tends to lean when in crisis:

" The proclamation of relativism is provocative. ... I am not particularly interested in being an apostle of relativism. But as I come from a dogmatic culture [Franco's regime], I'm allergic to some things. Truth, Reason and absolute correction were Catholic in that culture. Now I hear that postmodern relativism is the cause of the moral misery and the loss of values. It is seen that there is a nostalgia of dogmatic culture, disguised with some democratic and enlightened discourse. That dogmatic culture has relativism as its enemy, for that reason I claim this convicted relativism. But it is not an absolute relativism."

In this sense, for example, he is critical of the modern state, which he accuses of being the new church seeking to control our consciences. He also criticises the exploitation of morality, or in other words, how politicians, instead of solving the problems facing them in their various areas or fields, flee instead to moral ground to hide their responsibilities under the cloak of supposedly absolute moral principles:

"In the mean time, what is the point of repeating the old tale as to what the state is becoming? Once the sour critical analysis of sometime ago (Herbert Marcuse: One-Dimensional Man), the dark negative utopias (Aldous Huxley, George Orwell) and the protest cries (May 68) are forgotten, and with a near lack of the slightest sense of resistance in civil society, the cobweb of power spins peacefully over our heads, all over the place. Even the dressing room."

He also made an important contribution in questioning the canonical interpretations which have been constructed regarding different issues. Of particular interest, due to his erudition and training in Germany, is his interpretation of the German Enlightenment. In this context he deconstructed the apparent opposition between the French Enlightenment and German Romanticism and proposed a new way of thinking about the different aspects which stem from this opposition. In this way, he defies certain Spanish and French intellectuals (Alain Finkielkraut) and argued that nationalism in fact arose in France (Montesquieu, Voltaire, Rousseau, Ernest Renan) and was later reinterpreted by the German thinkers and romantics. By doing this, he questioned the way in which authors such as Goethe, Schiller, Herder or Humboldt are viewed as the fathers of metaphysical nationalism. In this field, the opposition between civic nationalism and ethnic nationalism was deconstructed. Thus, Azurmendi criticizes the essentialist basis of Spanish nationalism and French nationalism that operates under these nation states.

Some of the topics Azurmendi deeply developed in his essays first appeared in his poetry of youth. Azurmendi was within the Basque poetry of the 1960s which shows the fight against the tradition, the old faith and the dogmatic certainties:

But we wish to be free
is that my fault?
They tried to give us a tree from Gernika,
a false blank check,
as if the desire to be free were a sin,
as if we needed an excuse for it,
but despite that, we, quite simply, wish to be free.
That is what we want, that is all.
This is the latest deception:
they have led us to believe
before from outside and now from within
that it is our responsibility to justify our wish to be free.

Manifestu atzeratua (Belated Manifesto) (1968)

He also dedicated a large part of his work to recovering and reinterpreting Basque thinkers, breaking through and dismantling numerous stereotypes. Of particular interest is his research into Jon Mirande, Orixe, Unamuno and others. He was an author who worked from within and for Basque culture. He claimed to have been influenced by Basque authors from the post-war period, for example, in questions of language. In this field, he researched other authors also, including Heidegger, Wittgenstein, George Steiner and Humboldt. The fact that his vast oeuvre is all written in the Basque language is clearly consistent with his thinking.

== Writing style ==
Joxe Azurmendi's works include various colloquial expressions, and his prose is fast-paced and sharp. Azurmendi's Basque is modern and standard.

== Reception ==
In later years, important steps were taken to make Azurmendi's work known. In the last decade, for example, all of his work was digitized; several articles were written, many of them by his former students; courses on his thought were organized and several magazines published monographs.

Later, more systematic lines of research were initiated. For example, at the University of the Basque Country (EHU) three doctoral theses which take Azurmendi as a reference have already been presented and didactic proposals have also been made to incorporate his thought into the curriculum of the Basque teaching system.

Lately, several Basque authors have opened a line of research to put Azurmendi's thought in dialogue with feminism. In this sense, the researcher Mikel Urdangarin has compared in his doctoral thesis the model of the subject developed by Azurmendi in his work and the model that has been developed by several feminist authors such as Simone de Beauvoir, Silvia Federici, Monique Wittig, Maria Mies, Judith Butler or Vandana Shiva.

Some researchers are already talking about a school of thought centered on Azurmendi's ideas.

== Awards and recognition ==
- 1976: Andima Ibiñagabeitia Award for the work: Espainolak eta euskaldunak
- 1978: Irun Hiria Award for the work: Mirande eta kristautasuna (Mirande and Christianity).
- 1998: Irun Hiria Award for the work: Teknikaren meditazioa (Meditations on Technique).
- 2005: Juan San Martin Award for the work: Humboldt: Hizkuntza eta pentsamendua (Humboldt. Language and Thought).
- 2010: Euskadi Literatura Saria Award, in the essay category, for the work: Azken egunak Gandiagarekin (The last days with Gandiaga).
- 2010: Ohorezko euskaltzaina by Euskaltzaindia.
- 2011: Professor Emeritus of the University of the Basque Country.
- 2012: Eusko Ikaskuntza Award.
- 2012: Dabilen Elea Award
- 2014: Digitization of the entire work of Joxe Azurmendi by The Council of Gipuzkoa
- 2015: Euskadi Literatura Saria Award, in the essay category, for the work: Historia, arraza, nazioa (History, race, nation).
- 2019: Joxe Azurmendi Congress hosted by Joxe Azurmendi Katedra and University of the Basque Country
- 2025: Nearly a hundred people from Basque culture took part in a collective tribute to Azurmendi's life, work and thought, published in the journal Jakin issue 269/270. That issue was rounded off by a piece which gathers together anonymous messages of condolence received by Jakin in the days following his passing.

== In popular culture ==
In 2026, the newspaper Gara distributed a poster-size calendar featuring a collage by the comic book creator Unai Iturriaga dedicated to Azurmendi, composed of passages from the philosopher’s life, his works, and interpretations of his thought.

Also in 2026, a team comprising a PhD in philosophy, Mikel Urdangarin, illustrator Usue Egia, and feminist screenwriter Ainhoa Olaso, published a graphic novel in Basque. The book features fictional encounters between Angela Davis and Azurmendi, where they discuss a wide range of issues.

== Works ==
The Inguma database of the Basque scientific community contains over 180 texts written by Azurmendi.

=== Essays ===
- Hizkuntza, etnia eta marxismoa (Language, Ethnics and Marxism) (1971, Euskal Elkargoa)
- Kolakowski (Kołakowski) (1972, EFA): co-author: Joseba Arregui
- Kultura proletarioaz (About Proletarian Culture) (1973, Jakin EFA)
- Iraultza sobietarra eta literatura (The Soviet Revolution and Literature) (1975, Gero Mensajero)
- Gizona Abere hutsa da (Man is Pure Animal) (1975, EFA)
- Zer dugu Orixeren kontra? (What do we have against Orixe?) (1976, EFA Jakin)
- Zer dugu Orixeren alde? (What do we have in favour of Orixe?) (1977, EFA Jakin)
- Artea eta gizartea (Art and Society) (1978, Haranburu)
- Errealismo sozialistaz (About Socialist Realism) (1978, Haranburu)
- Mirande eta kristautasuna (Mirande and Christianity) (1978, GAK)
- Arana Goiriren pentsamendu politikoa (The political thinking of Arana Goiri) (1979, Hordago Lur)
- Nazionalismo Internazionalismo Euskadin (Nationalism Internationalism in the Basque Country) (1979, Hordago Lur)
- PSOE eta euskal abertzaletasuna (The Spanish Socialist Party and Basque Nationalism) (1979, Hordago Lur)
- El hombre cooperativo. Pensamiento de Arizmendiarrieta (Cooperative Man. Arizmendiarrieta's thinking) (1984, Lan Kide Aurrezkia)
  - Translated into Japanese as ホセ・アスルメンディ: アリスメンディアリエタの協同組合哲学 ( 東大和 : みんけん出版, 1990) ISBN 4-905845-73-4
- Filosofía personalista y cooperación. Filosofía de Arizmendiarrieta (Personalist philosophy and cooperation. Arizmendiarrieta's philosophy) (1984, EHU)
- Schopenhauer, Nietzsche, Spengler, Miranderen pentsamenduan (Schopenhauer, Nietzsche, Spengler in the thinking of Mirande) (1989, Susa)
- Miranderen pentsamendua (Mirande's thinking) (1989, Susa)
- Gizaberearen bakeak eta gerrak (War and Peace according to the Human Animal) (1991, Elkar)
- Espainolak eta euskaldunak (The Spanish and the Basques) (1992, Elkar)
  - Translated into Spanish as Azurmendi, Joxe: Los españoles y los euskaldunes, Hondarribia: Hiru, 1995. ISBN 978-84-87524-83-7
- Karlos Santamaria. Ideiak eta ekintzak (Karlos Santamaria. Ideas and Action) (1994, The Gipuzkoa Provincial Council (unpublished))
- La idea cooperativa: del servicio a la comunidad a su nueva creación (The cooperative idea: from the community service toward its new creation) (1996, Gizabidea Fundazioa)
- Demokratak eta biolentoak (The Democrats and the Violent) (1997, Elkar)
- Teknikaren meditazioa (Meditations on Technique) (1998, Kutxa Fundazioa)
- Oraingo gazte eroak (The Mad Youth of Today) (1998, Enbolike)
- El hecho catalán. El hecho portugués (The Catalan fact. The Portuguese fact) (1999, Hiru)
- Euskal Herria krisian (The Basque Country in Crisis) (1999, Elkar)
- La violencia y la búsqueda de nuevos valores (The violence and the search for new values) (2001, Hiru)
- La presencia de Nietzsche en los pensadores vascos Ramiro de Maeztu y Jon Mirande (The Nietzsche's presence in the Basque thinkers Ramiro de Maeztu and Jon Mirande) (2002, Euskalerriaren Adiskideen Elkartea)
- Etienne Salaberry. Bere pentsamenduaz (1903–2003) (Etienne Salaberry. About his Thinking (1903–2003)) (2003, Egan)
- Espainiaren arimaz (About the soul of Spain) (2006, Elkar)
- Volksgeist. Herri gogoa (Volksgeist. National Character) (2007, Elkar)
- Humboldt. Hizkuntza eta pentsamendua (Humboldt. Language and Thought) (2007, UEU)
- Azken egunak Gandiagarekin (The last days with Gandiaga) (2009, Elkar)
- Bakea gudan (Peace in War) (2012, Txalaparta)
- Barkamena, kondena, tortura (Forgiveness, Condemnation, Torture) (2012, Elkar)
- Karlos Santamariaren pentsamendua (Karlos Santamaria's thinking) (2013, Jakin/EHU)
- Historia, arraza, nazioa (History, race, nation) (2014, Elkar)
- Gizabere kooperatiboaz (About the cooperative Human Animal) (2016, Jakin)
- Hizkuntza, Nazioa, Estatua (Language, Nation, State) (2017, Elkar)
- Beltzak, juduak eta beste euskaldun batzuk (Blacks, Jews and other Basques) (2018, Elkar)
- Pentsamenduaren historia Euskal Herrian (History of thought in the Basque Country) (2020, EHU-Jakin)
- Europa bezain zaharra (As old as Europe) (2023, Jakin)

=== Posthumous ===
- Gure klasizismo txikia (Our little classicism) (2026, Jakin)

=== Poetry ===
- Hitz berdeak (Unrefined words) (1971, EFA)
- XX. mendeko poesia kaierak – Joxe Azurmendi (Books of 20th century poetry – Joxe Azurmendi) (2000, Susa), edited by Koldo Izagirre.

=== Articles in journals ===
- Articles in the journal Jakin
- Articles in the journal Anaitasuna
- Articles in the journal RIEV

== See also ==
- Modernity
- Postmodernism
