= Jose Agerre =

Basque writer & politician (1889–1962)

Jose Agerre Santesteban or José Aguerre Santesteban (29 December 1889 – 19 October 1962) was a Basque writer, journalist and politician who focused on Basque nationalism. He was known by the pseudonym Gurbindo. He was a member of Euskaltzaindia. During the Second Republic, Agerre headed one of the largest Navarrese newspapers, La Voz de Navarra, for several years.

== Biography ==
The son of a carpenter from the Aezkoa, Jose Agerre began studying for the priesthood but abandoned his studies when he was just one year away from being ordained. In 1913, he taught Basque language classes at the Euskal Etxea of the Basque Nationalist Party in Pamplona. He was also secretary of this social center. In February 1915, he was put in charge of an editorial section in the Basque language entitled “Euzkerazko saila” in the daily newspaper Diario de Navarra. Between 1918 and 1919, he edited the weekly newspaper Napartarra, published by the Basque-Navarrese Nationalist Party.

At the age of 30, Jose Agerre was appointed academician at the Academy of the Basque Language, or Euskaltzaindia. But in 1920, a year later, he was transferred by his agricultural equipment company to Seville and decided to give up his position. The academy appointed Brother Dámaso Inza to replace him.

After returning to Pamplona in 1931, he became editor of the magazine Amayur. In 1932, Jose Agerre was appointed by Ikaskuntza, or the Basque Studies Society, and became secretary of the Navarrese delegation. From April 1935 until the start of the Spanish Civil War of 1936–1939, he was president of Napar Buru Batzar, a political organization in Navarre run by the PNV.

In Navarre, where Franco's uprising triumphed, there was widespread political repression, with even some Basque nationalist politicians being shot. The headquarters of the PNB in Pamplona, Villava – Atarrabia, and Marcilla were seized. In Pamplona, the printing presses of the nationalist newspaper La Voz de Navarra were requisitioned and used to print the periodical Arriba España. As president of the newspaper and the Navarrese PNB, Jose Agerre was imprisoned.

After the war, he devoted himself more to poetry. His recurring theme was religion. He was an admirer of Nikolas Ormaetxea, known as “Nikolas Ormaetxea,” and like him, Jose Agerre embraced classicism. His poems were published several times in the Pamplona-based magazine Pregón, a publication linked to the Falange Española, and also in the Carlist newspaper El Pensamiento Navarro. They appeared in the Basque magazines Euzko Gogoa, Egan, and Olerti.

As for the type of Basque, Patxi Zabaleta believes (Revue Basque, 1961) that Jose Agerre uses a Gipuzkoan dialect enriched with Navarrese details and quite imbued with purism.

Jose Agerre died on October 19, 1962. In 2000, compiled by Joxemiel Bidador, the Pamplona City Council published his Aftermath of World War II. The book is entitled Jose Agerre Santesteban. Gerra ondoko olerki-lanak (1949–1962). Published by Pamiela, Joxemiel Bidador provides an analysis of the writer.
