= Markeskua Palace =

Coordinates: 43°11′00″N 2°28′43″W

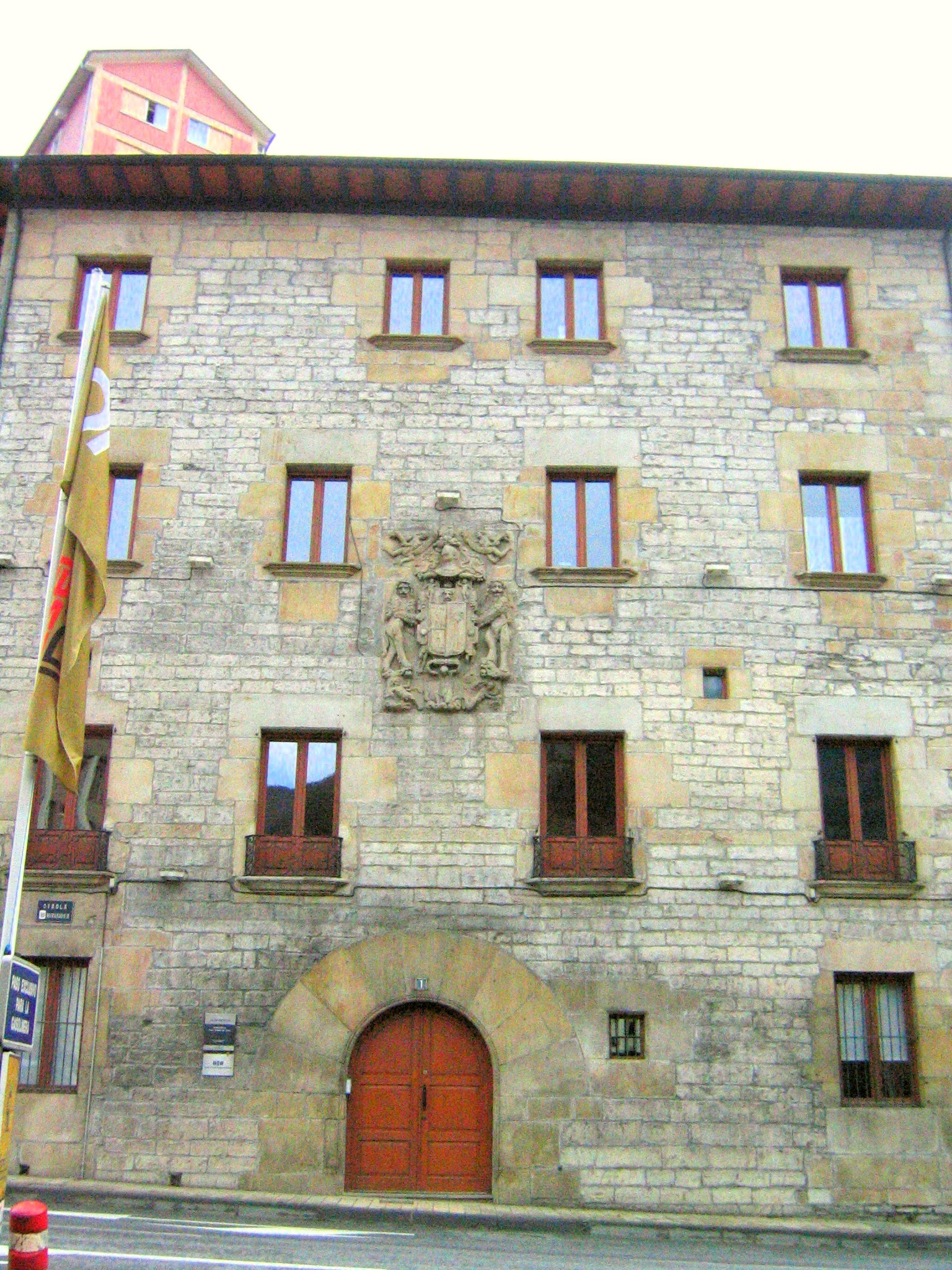
- Former names: Torre de Isasi

General information
- Town or city: Eibar

The Markeskua Palace, also known as the Tower of Isasi (Isasi Dorrea in Basque, Torre de Isasi in Spanish) or Palace of the Marquis of Isasi, is a renaissance noble house located in the Basque town of Eibar (Spain).

== History ==
Marquis Martin Lopez Isasi and his wife Domenja Orbea gave orders to build it in the sixteenth century. It was built, as was customary, outside the village proper, on the road to Ermua. At the time, members of the Isasi family held important positions in the Spanish court. In 1631, king Philip IV of Spain entrusted the education of his illegitimate son Francisco Fernando Isidro (Francis Ferdinand Isidore) to Juan Isasi Idiakez, the marquis at the time. The boy lived at this house from age 4 to 7, when he died on March 11, 1634. It does not seem that this fact bothered the king too much, since a few months later, in November 1634, Philip entrusted the marquis with the education of his son and legitimate heir Balthasar Charles, the Prince of Asturias. However, there is no notice that Balthasar Charles ever lived at this house; he also died young, at age 16, but in Zaragoza.

Since the 18th century, the building was occupied by a congregation of nuns. In the last quarter of the 20th century, the nuns left and a Basque-language school or ikastola used the building. In the 21st century, the city council renewed the building at ceded its use to the Basque Summer University, which is headqueartered there since 2000.

== Description ==
It is a building with a quadrangular floor plan and a hip roof. It has attached to the left side a lower building that is covered with three waters. The lateral and rear façades are made of masonry and the main one is built in ashlar. The facades finish off in a wooden eave with carved cannons.

The palace has a ground floor and three heights, with three openings on the ground floor. The a central access in a round arch voussoired in sandstone ashlars. The arch is flanked by two lintelled and framed windows.

Between the first and second heights and centered on the façade is the coat of arms of the Isasis, large and bordered by two lions. The right façade presents two lintelled and framed windows on the ground floor. On the main façade, three lintelled and framed windows per floor. On the left side, on the ground floor, a lintelled access, a platband delimiting the heights and two linteled and framed windows on the first height.
