= Manuel Sáez =

Spanish painter (born 1961)

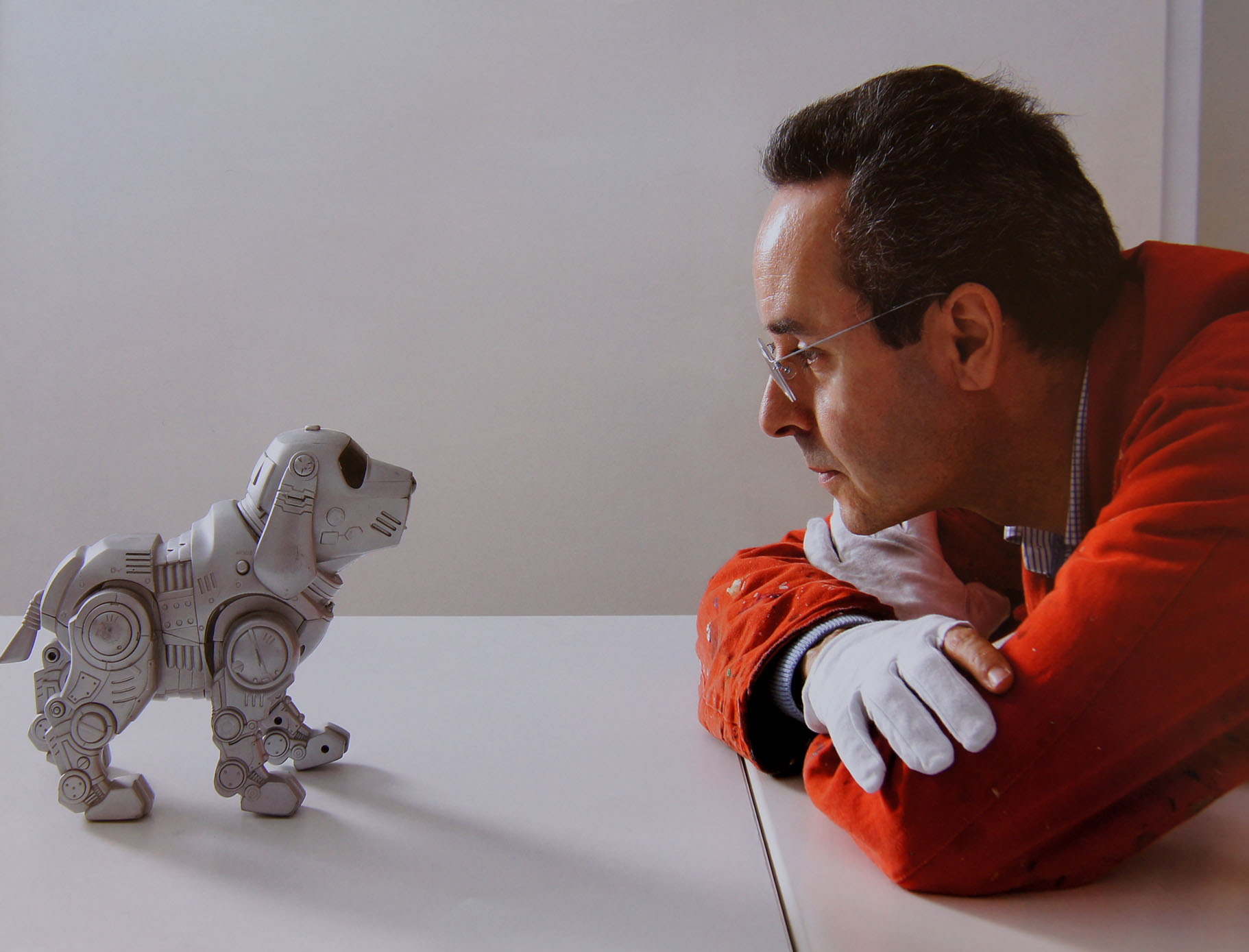
- Manuel Sáez, Sala Parpalló, Valencia, 2008
- Born: 6 March 1961 (age 65); Castellón, Spain
- Website: Official website

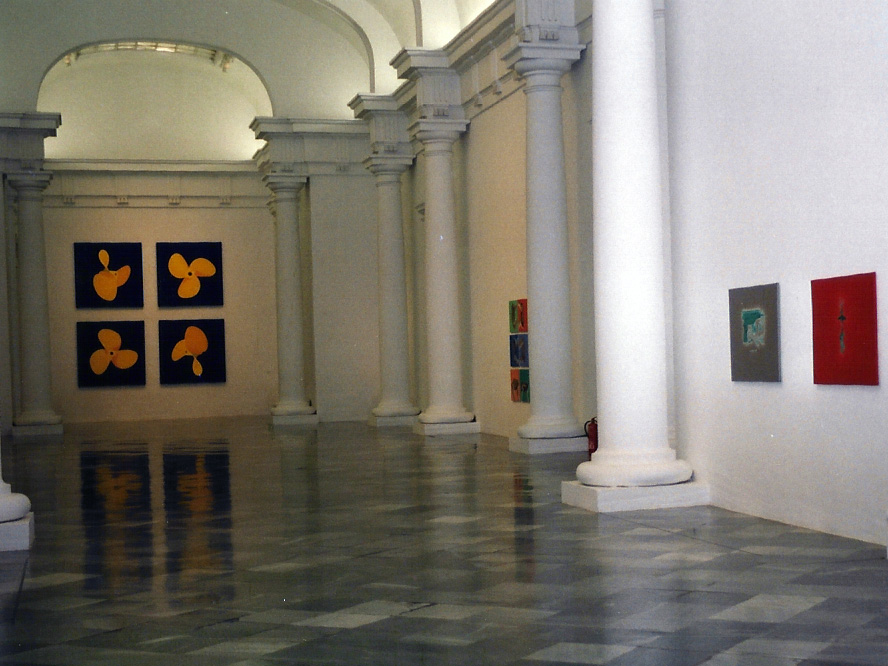
Manuel Sáez Exhibition, IVAM, Valencia

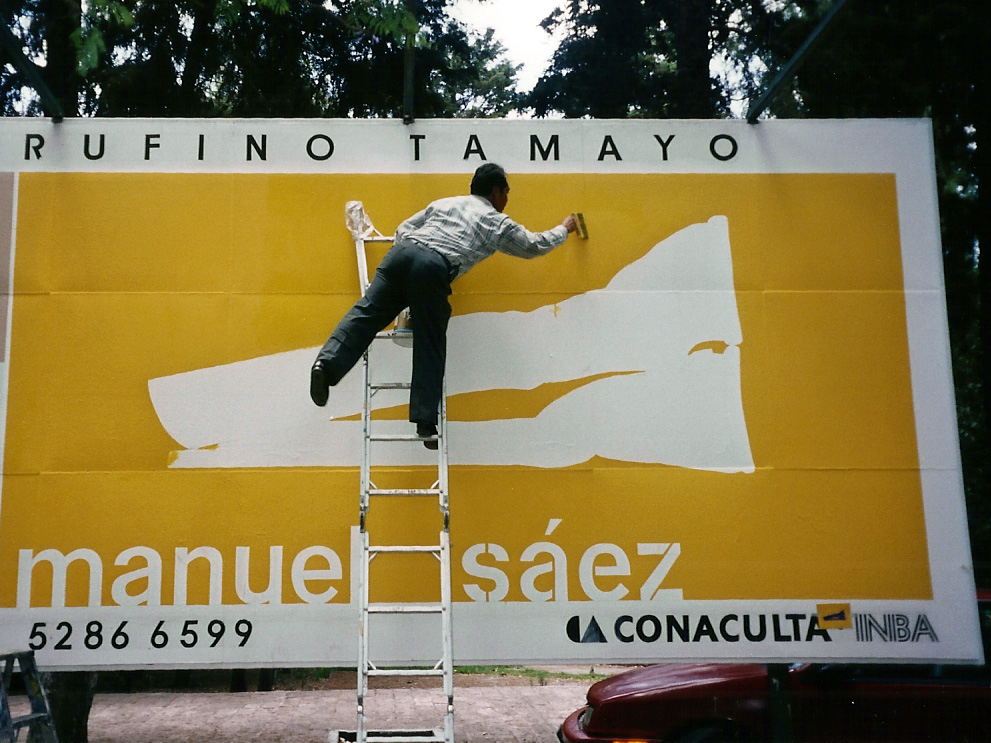
Manuel Sáez exhibition poster for his 2000 show at the Museo Rufino Tamayo exhibition in Mexico City

Manuel Sáez (born 6 March 1961) is a Spanish artist. Since 1984, he has been living and working in Valencia.

== Background ==
Sáez was born in Castellón, Spain.

== Career ==
The Enciclopedia Universal Ilustrada Europeo-Americana describes Manuel Sáez as among the most important painters of the turn of the 21st century owing to his simultaneously sensual and psychological approach to the world of objects, landscapes, figures and portraits.

=== 1980s ===
During the 1980s, Sáez worked in Barcelona, Valencia and Madrid. The series Calvos, Bodegones, Arboles, Aviones and Arquitecturas ("Baldmen, Still Lives, Trees, Airplanes and Architecture") belong to this period.

=== 1990s ===
As a resident fellow of the Spanish Fine Arts Academy in Rome in 1990, Sáez elaborated a series of portraits called Biografia no autorizada ("Unauthorized Biography"). During 1992 he completed the series Dioptrias ("Dioptres") and in 1993 the series Aquiles ("Achilles"). In 1995 he moved to the Dominican Republic, where, inspired by the tropical landscape surrounding him, Sáez drew and made a series of paintings and watercolours which were exhibited at the University of Valencia in 1996. Since 2004 Sáez's work has centred on an increasingly more focused and refined study of drawing and in a series of portraits begun in 1990. These portraits consist of friends, patrons and well-known contemporary figures.

== Exhibits ==
Over the years, Manuel Sáez has exhibited in various museums and private institutions in his native Spain and abroad.

In 1991 Sáez held his first important show at the Fundació La Caixa. in Valencia In 1996 he presented his first retrospective, Colección Exclusiva 1984-1995, in the Club Diario Levante of Valencia, as well as the Madrid Circle of Fine Arts, the Salas Verónicas of Murcia, the Castellón Delegation and the Brocense of Cáceres. In 2000 Sáez exhibited in Mexico City's Museo Rufino Tamayo and in the Instituto Valenciano de Arte Moderno (IVAM) in Valencia. In 2008 Sáez's work could be seen at the Sala Parpalló in Valencia.

Sáez has participated in numerous major group exhibitions. In 1988–1989, Modos de ver ("Ways of Seeing") was on show at the Madrid Circle of Fine Arts, as well as at the Pabellón Mudéjar in Seville, the Centro de Arte Santa Mónica in Barcelona and the IVAM – Centro del Carmen in Valencia. In 1994, Galería de retratos ("Gallery of Portraits") was on display at the Madrid Circle of Fine Arts. In 1996, Corona roja sobre el volcán ("Red Crown Over the Volcano") appeared at the Centro Atlántico de Arte Moderno (CAAM) in Las Palmas de Gran Canaria. In 1994–1995, Confrontaciones. Los entornos de la imagen ("Confrontations. The Environments of the Image") appeared at the National Museum of Anthropology in Madrid. In 2000–2001, Garaje ("Garage") at the Fundación Carlos de Amberes de Madrid and in the Centro Galego de Arte Contemporánea. In 2002, Plural. El Arte español ante el siglo XXI ("Plural. Spanish Art Before the 21st Century") appeared at the Spanish Senate in Madrid. In 2003, Atarazanas in Valencia presented 50 años de arte valenciano ("Fifty Years of Valencian Art"). In 2003–2004, Dispersions was exhibited at the Bass Museum of Art in Miami. In 2007, Sáez's work is featured in the Valencian Institute of Modern Art's (IVAM) El Pop Art en la Colección del IVAM ("Pop Art in the IVAM Collection") in Valencia.

== Commissions and awards ==
Over the years, Manuel Sáez has been commissioned to undertake various projects for private and public spaces. One of the more spectacular ones consists of a 1,884m^{2} ceramic mosaic covering the circular main square (Àgora) at the University of Jaime I in Castellón. The Ágora consists of 13,046 pieces 33 x 33 cm, and 14,884 pieces 16.25 x 16.25 cm in white and blue tiles. Sáez chose the image of a white glove to symbolize knowledge.

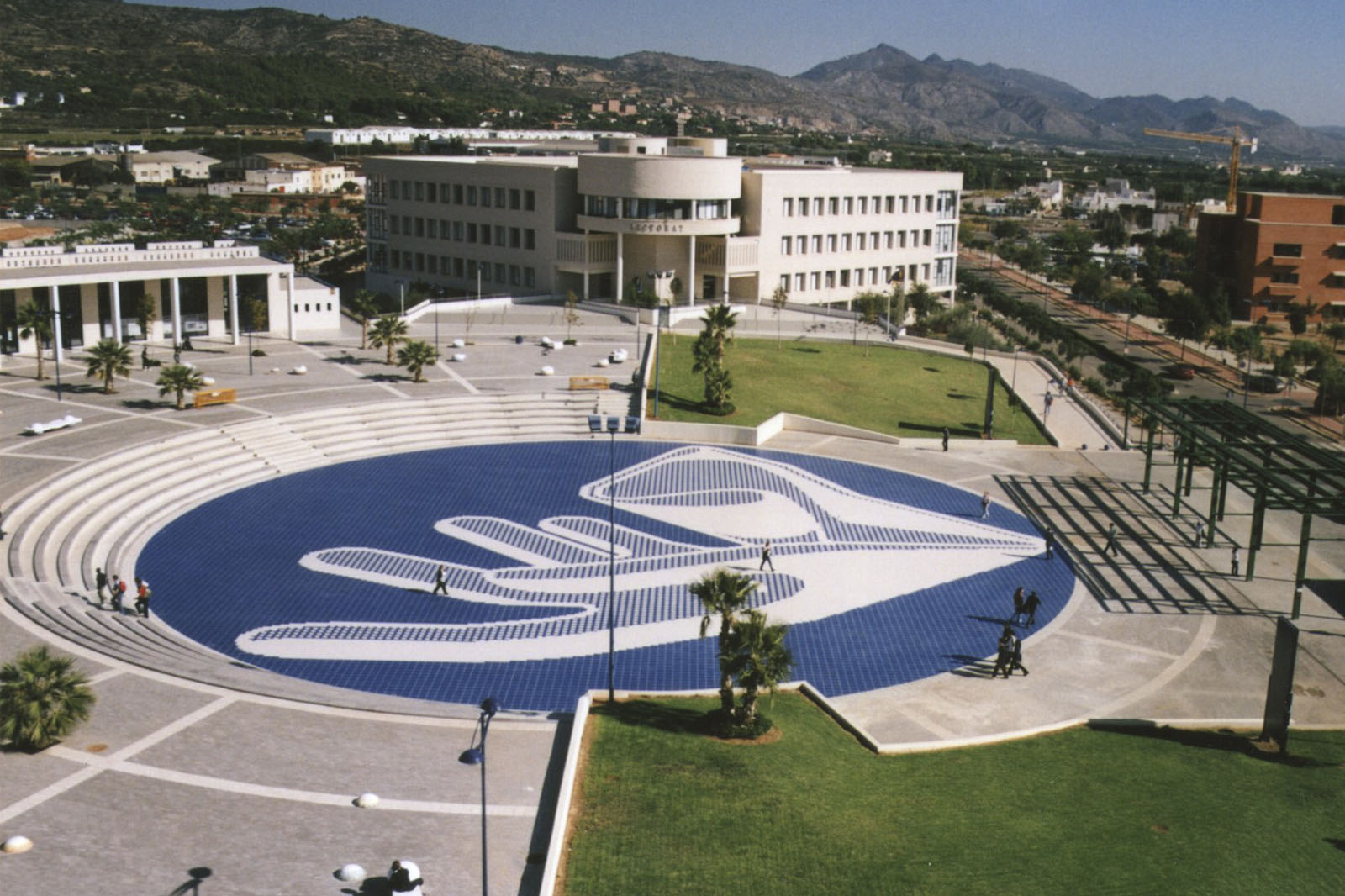
Ágora Mosaic at the University Jaume I in Castellón.

An illustrator as well, Sáez's work appeared in Spanish poet Carlos Marzal's 2009 collection Ánima Mía, as well as a 1994 short story by Bernardo Atxaga for the magazine Ronda Iberia.

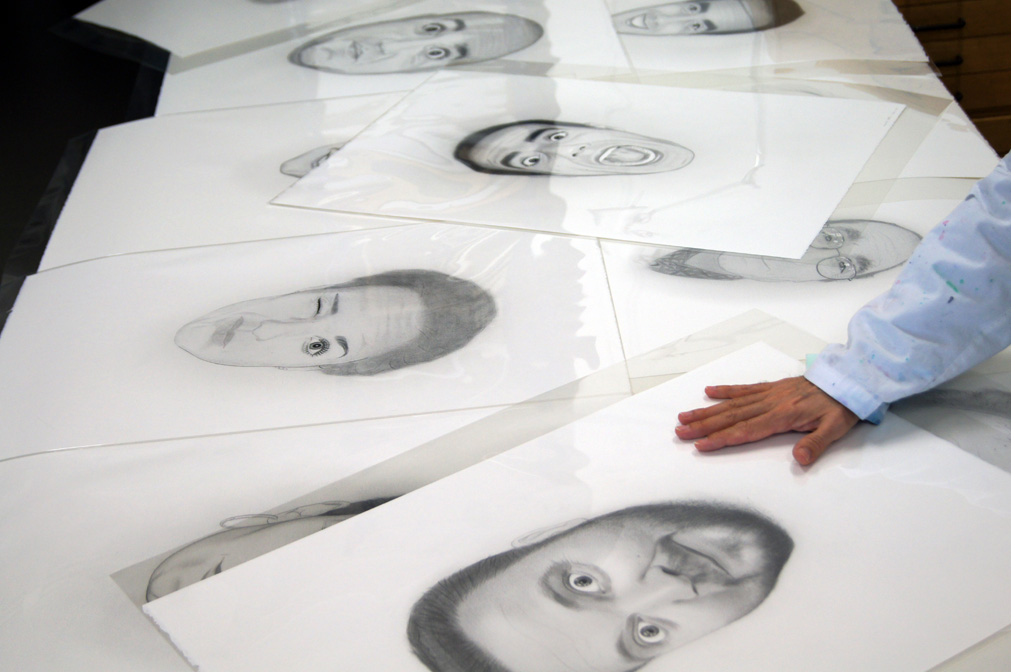
Retratos by Manuel Sáez

Sáez is the recipient of several grants and awards including the Salón de Otoño de Sagunto, 1983; the Creación Artística Banesto grant, 1989; the Spanish Fine Arts Academy of Rome fellowship, 1990; the Icarus Prize Group 16, Madrid 1990.
