= Ramon Saizarbitoria =

Spanish writer (born 1944)

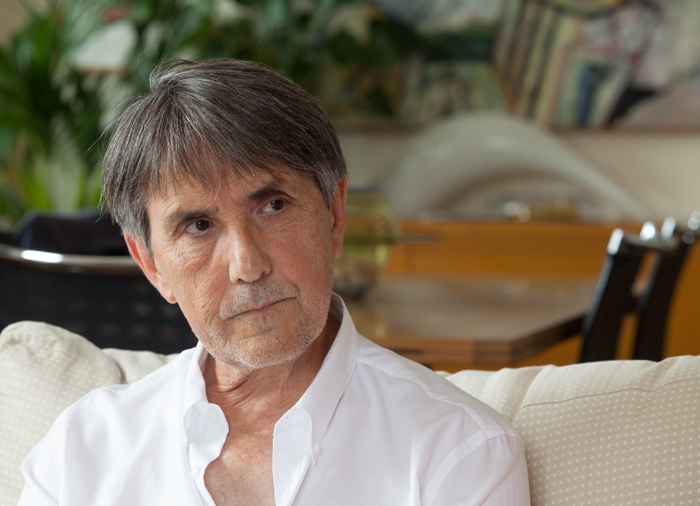
- Born: 21 April 1944 (age 82); San Sebastián, Basque Country
- Occupation: Writer
- Writing career
- Notable work: Ehun metro

Ramon Saizarbitoria (born 21 April 1944, in San Sebastián, Spain in the autonomous community of Basque Country) is a contemporary Basque writer and sociologist.

== Life ==
Ramon Saizarbitoria has a Bachelor of Arts degree in sociology from the University of Fribourg in Switzerland, and is director of the Center for Documentation and Sociological Studies of San Sebastián in Basque Country, Spain. He has published numerous books in the field of social services. Since the mid-1960s, he has been working in media in the Basque Country. In 1967, he collaborated with other writers to create LUR publishing. In the 1970s, he launched the literary magazine "Oh! Euskadi". Saizarbitoria is primarily a novelist, but has also written essays and poetry. He is one of the most important authors in Basque literature, and is considered, along with 'Txillardegi', as the modernizer of the Basque novel. In 1986, the director Alfonso Ungría adapted Saizarbitoria's book Ehun Metro into a movie. Saizarbitoria is primarily a novelist, but has also written essays and poetry. He is one of the most important authors in Basque literature, and is considered, along with 'Txillardegi', as the modernizer of the Basque novel. In 1986, the director Alfonso Ungría adapted Saizarbitoria's book Ehun Metro into a movie.

== Works ==
=== Poetry ===
- Poesia banatua (Lur, 1969), in HAINBAT AUTORE, Euskal Elerti 69 (461–484).

=== Novels ===
- Egunero Hasten Delako (Lur, 1969).
- Ehun Metro (Lur, 1976). Spanish edition: Cien metros (Nuestra Cultura Editorial, 1979).
- Ene Jesus (Kriselu, 1976).
- Hamaika Pauso (Erein, 1995). Spanish edition: Los pasos incontables (Espasa-Calpe, 1998).
- Bihotz bi. Gerrako kronikak (Erein, 1996). Spanish edition: Amor y guerra (Espasa-Calpe, 1999).
- Gorde nazazu lurpean (Erein, 2000). Spanish edition:Guárdame bajo tierra (Alfaguara, 2002).
- Kandinskyren tradizioa (Erein, 2003). Bilingual edition: Kandinskyren tradizioa-La tradición de Kandinsky (Atenea, 2003).
- Martutene (Erein, 2012). Spanish edition: Martutene (Erein, 2013). English edition: Martutene (HispaBooks, Madrid, 2016).

=== Non-fiction ===
- Mendebaleko ekonomiaren historia; Merkantilismotik 1914-era arte ("Historia de la economía de Occidente; del Mercantilismo a 1914") (Lur,1970).
- Nacer en Guipúzcoa, (Servicio de Estudios Aspace, 1981).
- Perinatalidad y prevención, (Hordago, 1981).
- Aberriaren alde (eta kontra), (Alberdania, 1999).

== See also ==
- Koldo Izagirre
