= Gero (book) =

1643 book by Pedro Agerre

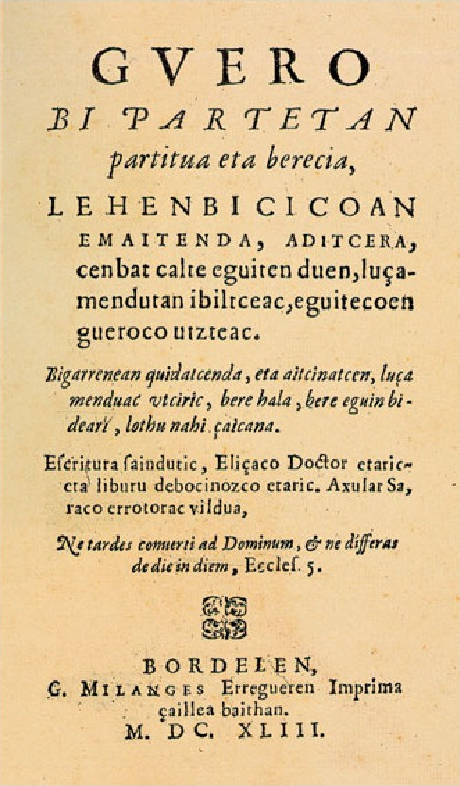
- Cover of the first edition
- Author: Pedro Agerre
- Original title: Guero
- Language: Basque
- Publication date: 1643
- Publication place: France
- Media type: Print
- ISBN: 8472400603
- LC Class: BX2349 .A89 1976

Gero (Basque for 'later', Guero in the orthography of the day) is a 17th-century ascetic book in Basque written by Pedro Agerre, better known as Axular. It is considered one of the masterpieces of classic Basque prose and literature altogether. Its accomplished, elaborate language in classic Lapurdian dialect turned it into a writing model for later writers from Labourd.

== Publication and incomplete nature ==
It was published in Bordeaux in 1643 under the patronage of Bertrand D'Etchauz, the Basque archbishop of Tours (1617-1641). The book was written after the period of the harrowing Labourd witch-hunt of 1609 (Pierre de Lancre's intervention in Labourd). While the title's tagline reads "divided into two parts", only the existence of one book has been attested. Basque scholar Pierre Lafitte claimed that both parts had been merged into one. By contrast, the former president of the Basque Language Academy Luis Villasante held that the second part had been actually lost.

== Writing style and intended audience ==
The book, written in an instructive tone, dwells on the idea of the harm and misfortunes issued from putting off one's religious duties, on the grounds that men need to turn to Christ with no delay. Gero shows no mysticism, but the book intends to explain and prove an ascetic idea, arranged as if it was to be addressed from the pulpit to the parishioners.

== See also ==
- Basque literature
