= Koldo Izagirre =

Koldo Izagirre Urreaga (born 21 June 1953 in Pasaia, Gipuzkoa) is an innovative Basque writer who has worked in several genres of literature, including poetry, novels, and tales. Izagirre has translated works by classic authors into other languages. He has also written texts, both for young people and adults. In addition, he has produced journal and magazine articles, and written television and film scripts.

In 1978, he founded the literature magazine Oh! Euzkadi with Ramon Saizarbitoria and other writers. In the 1980s he wrote Panpina Ustela with Bernardo Atxaga.

In 1990, he directed the film Offeko maitasuna and also wrote the script, as he did for the film Ke arteko egunak. He also wrote some cartoons.

== Works ==
=== Some essays ===
- Itsaso ahantzia ("Forsaken sea"), 1976, Kriseilu.
- Oinaze zaharrera ("On the way to the old pain"), 1977, Ustela saila.
- Guardasola ahantzia ("Forsaken umbrella"), 1978, Ustela Saila.
- Balizko erroten erresuma ("The kingdom of the hypothetical mills"), 1989, Susa.
- Non dago Basque harbour? ("Where is Basque Harbour?"), 1997, Susa.
- Teilatuko lizarra ("An ashtree over the roof"), 2005, Susa.
- Rimmel, 2006, Susa.
- Parisen bizi naiz ("I live in Paris"), 2013, Susa.
- Autopsiarako frogak ("Evidence for the autopsy"), 2010, Susa.

=== Novels ===
- Euzkadi merezi zuten ("They deserved Euzkadi"), 1985, Hordago.
- Nik ere Germinal! egin gura nuen aldarri ("I also wanted to turn Germinal! into a slogan"), 1998, Elkar.
- Agirre zaharraren kartzelaldi berriak ("New prison terms for the old Agirre"), 1999, Elkar.
- Egarri egunak portualdean ("Thirst days in the harbour area"), 2011, Susa.

=== Stories ===
- Metxa esaten dioten agirretar baten ibili herrenak ("The lame walks of an Agirre called Metxa"), 1991, Elkar.
- Vladimir, 1996, Erein.
- Sua nahi, Mr Churchill? ("May I light it, Mr. Churchill?"), 2005, Susa.

=== Dictionaries ===
- Euskal Lokuzioak ("Basque expressions"), 1981, Hordago.

=== Chronicles ===
- Ez duk erraza, konpai ("It ain't easy, compañero"), 1995, Susa.
- "Merry Christmas, Panama" esan zuen heriotzak ("'Merry Christmas, Panama', Death said") 1999, Euskaldunon Egunkaria.

=== Translations ===
- Desertorea (Le deserteur, "The Deserter"), Boris Vian. Armiarma, 2009
- Gaueko hegaldia (Vol de nuit, "Night flight"), Antoine de Saint-Exupéry. Igela, 2008
- Bi poema ("Two poems"), Wisława Szymborska. 1999, 2008
- Hogeita bost poema ("Twenty five poems"), Mahmud Darwish. Transl.: Itxaro Borda / Koldo Izagirre / armiarma.com, 2008
- Ulenspiegelen elezaharra, Charles De Coster. Alberdania-Elkar, 2007
- Umearen ehiza, Jacques Prevert. Realpolitik, 2006
- Sud-Ouestaren argia, Roland Barthes. susa-literatura.com, 2005
- Antoloxia homenaxe, 32 poema, Manuel Maria. Fato Cultural Daniel Castelao, 2005
- Nazkatutako bluesa, Langston Hughes. Ahalegina, 2004
- Eguna garaitu, gaua garaitu, Robert Desnos. Ahalegina, 2004
- Nekatua nago, Yehuda Amichai. Ahalegina, 2004
- Ni zapatok naute, Felix Leclerc. Itzul.: Itxaro Borda / Koldo Izagirre / Ahalegina, 2004
- Iparburuko esploratzailea, Joseph Brodsky. Ahalegina, 2004
- Askatasunaren kantua, Banira Giri. Ahalegina, 2004
- Lanari lotua, Liam O'Muirthile. Ahalegina, 2004
- Ez ezazula uste, Claes Andersson. Ahalegina, 2004
- Katu beltza, Ali Prodimja. Ahalegina, 2004
- Ireki leihoak, mesedez!, Fakhar Zaman. Ahalegina, 2004
- Estrontzio 90, Nazim Hikmet. Ahalegina, 2004
- Adoreak, Juan Gelman. Ahalegina, 2004
- Hamar poema, Paul Éluard. armiarma.com, 2002
- Idi orgaren karranka, Victor Hugo. Elkar, 2002
- Heriofuga, Paul Celan. Literatura Unibertsala – Batxilergoa, 2000
- Zerua eta itsasoa, Joan Salvat-Papasseit. Vladimir-12, 1999
- Gauez ate joka datozenean, Xabier P. Docampo. Elkar, 1996
- Mateo falcone eta beste zenbait istorio, Prosper Mérimée. Elkar, 1995
- Idazlan hautatuak, Joan Salvat-Papasseit. Pamiela, 1995
- Poema antologia, Vladimir Maiakovski. Susa, 1993
- Intxixuen artxibotik, Rafael Dieste. Elkar, 1993
- Lauretatik lauretara, Manuel Antonio. Itzul.: Iñigo Aranbarri / Koldo Izagirre. Susa, 1992
- Ramon Lamoteren gauzak, Paco Martin. Elkar, 1989
- Aresti/Ferreiro/Espriu antologia, Salvador Espriu. Erein, 1988
- Bazterrak, Uxío Novoneyra. Pamiela, 1988
- Zirtzilak: Kristalezko begia, Alfonso Rodríguez Castelao. Susa, 1986
- Maiatza zorabiatuaren pastorala, Manuel Maria. Antzerti-72, 1985
- Berengela izeneko otarantza baten ibilketak eta biribilketak, Manuel Maria. Antzerti-72, 1985
- Kristalezko begia: eskeleto baten oroimenak, Alfonso Rodríguez Castelao. Kriselu, 1976
