= Salbatore Mitxelena =

Salbatore Mitxelena

Salbatore Mitxelena (Basque pronunciation: [mitʃelena]) (1919 in Zarautz, Gipuzkoa, (Spain) – 1965 in La Chaux-de-Fonds, Switzerland) was a friar and a writer in the Basque language.

== Biography ==
Mitxelena was ordained as a Catholic friar in the Franciscan Order and fled the country during the Spanish Civil War. In 1949 he authored the first book in Basque written about the Civil War.

He preached in Biscay but his ideas brought him into conflict with the church hierarchy of the time and led to his exile to South America (1954–1962) during which he continued to write and publish in Basque. He dedicated a book to Miguel de Unamuno, whom he admired in contrast to the majority of Basque writers. He ended his life ministering to Spanish immigrants in Switzerland.

== Works ==
- Unamuno eta Abendats (1958, Darracq) (essay on Unamuno)
- Arantzazu, euskal-sinismenaren poema (1949, EFA)
- Arraun ta amets (1955, Itxaropena)
- Idazlan guztiak (I eta II) (1977, EFA)
- XX. mendeko poesia kaierak – Salbatore Mitxelena (2000, Susa): Koldo Izagirreren edition
- Ama-semeak Arantzazuko kondairan (1951, EFA)
- Ogei kanta Arantzazuko (1952, EFA)
- Laburtuaz (2000, Olerti Etxea)
