= Jakin (magazine) =

- Editor-in-chief: Lorea Agirre
- Categories: Culture
- Frequency: Bi-monthly
- First issue: 1956
- Country: Spain
- Based in: San Sebastián
- Language: Basque language
- Website: www.jakin.eus
- ISSN: 0211-495X
- OCLC: 641793207

Jakin is a Spanish cultural group, magazine, and publishing house. Founded in 1956, it is one of the oldest in Basque language. "Jakin" means "knowledge" in Basque and the magazine specializes on social and cultural issues. One of the leading members of Jakin was the philosopher Joxe Azurmendi. Currently, the editor-in-chief of Jakin is Lorea Agirre.

== History and profile ==
Before the establishment of the magazine in 1956 Jakin was a cultural group. The first name of the magazine was Teologiaren Yardunak, and Nikolas Ormaetxea and Txillardegi, among others, wrote there.

The publication was prohibited by Franco's regime in 1969; publication resumed in 1977. During that period, Jakin began publishing books. Jakin was instrumental in the "cultivation" of Basque, increasing its ability to "express difficult topics".

In 2006, the magazine won the Argizaiola award.

== See also ==
- List of magazines in Spain
