= Nikolas Ormaetxea =

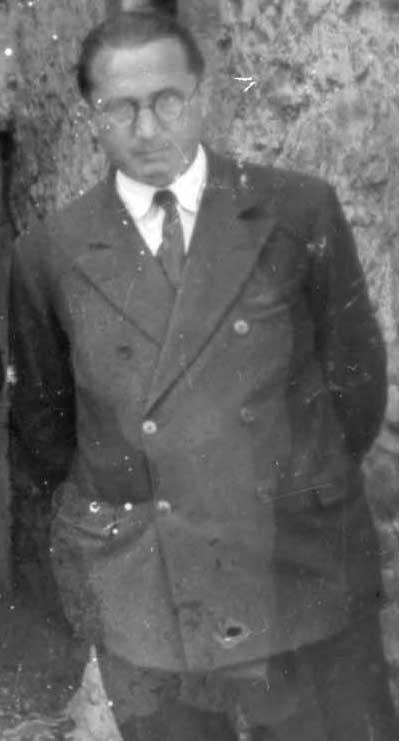
Orixe in 1933

Nikolas Ormaetxea, also known as Orixe (Orexa, Gipuzkoa, 6 December 1888 – Añorga, 9 October 1961) was a Basque language writer.

== Works ==
=== Novels ===
- Santa Cruz apaiza (1929, Leizaola)

=== Essays ===
- Euskal literaturaren atze edo edesti laburra (1927, Euskal-Esnalea aldizkaria)
- Jainkoaren billa (1971, Gero)
- Euskal literaturaren historia laburra (2002, Utriusque Vasconiae)

=== Poetry ===
- Eusko Olerkiak (1933, Euskaltzaleak)
- Barne-muinetan (1934, Itxaropena)
- Euskaldunak (1950, Itxaropena)
- Euskaldunak (poema eta olerki guziak) (1972, Auñamendi)
- XX. mendeko poesia kaierak - Orixe (2000, Susa): Koldo Izagirreren edizioa

=== Literary Journals ===
- Leoi-kumea (1948, La Photolith)

=== Machine Translation ===
- Tormesko itsu-mutilla (1929, Verdes-Atxirika)
- Mireio; Frederic Mistral (1930, Verdes-Atxirika)

=== Screenplays ===
- Mamutxak (1962, Euskal Herria)

=== Short stories ===
- Quiton arrebarekin (1950–1954, Euzko-Gogoa aldizkaria)

=== Collections ===
- Idazlan guztiak (sorkuntzazkoak) (1991, Etor)
- Orixe hautatua (2002, Hiria)

== Sources ==
- Azurmendi, Joxe 1976: Zer dugu Orixeren kontra?, Oñati, EFA.
- Azurmendi, Joxe 1977: Zer dugu Orixeren alde?, Oñati, EFA.
- Azurmendi, Joxe 2026: Gure klasizismo txikia, Andoain, Jakin. ISBN 978-84-12842-55-5
- Sudupe, Pako 2011: 50eko hamarkadako euskal literatura I. Hizkuntza eta ideologia eztabaidak, Donostia, Utriusque Vasconiae. ISBN 978-84-938329-4-0
- Sudupe, Pako 2011: 50eko hamarkadako euskal literatura II. Kazetaritza eta saiakera, Donostia, Utriusque Vasconiae. ISBN 978-84-938329-5-7
- Sudupe, Pako 2012: "Ideologia eztabaidak 50eko hamarkadan" in Alaitz Aizpuru (koord.), Euskal Herriko pentsamenduaren gida, Bilbo, UEU. ISBN 978-84-8438-435-9
- Sudupe, Pako 2025: "Orixe, Gandiaga, R. Arregi eta Txillardegi" in XX. mendeko euskal pentsamendua Joxe Azurmendiren talaiatik, Leioa, EHU. ISBN 978-84-9860-927-1
