= Basque Summer University =

University in Eibar, Spain

Coordinates: 43°11′0″N 2°28′43″W

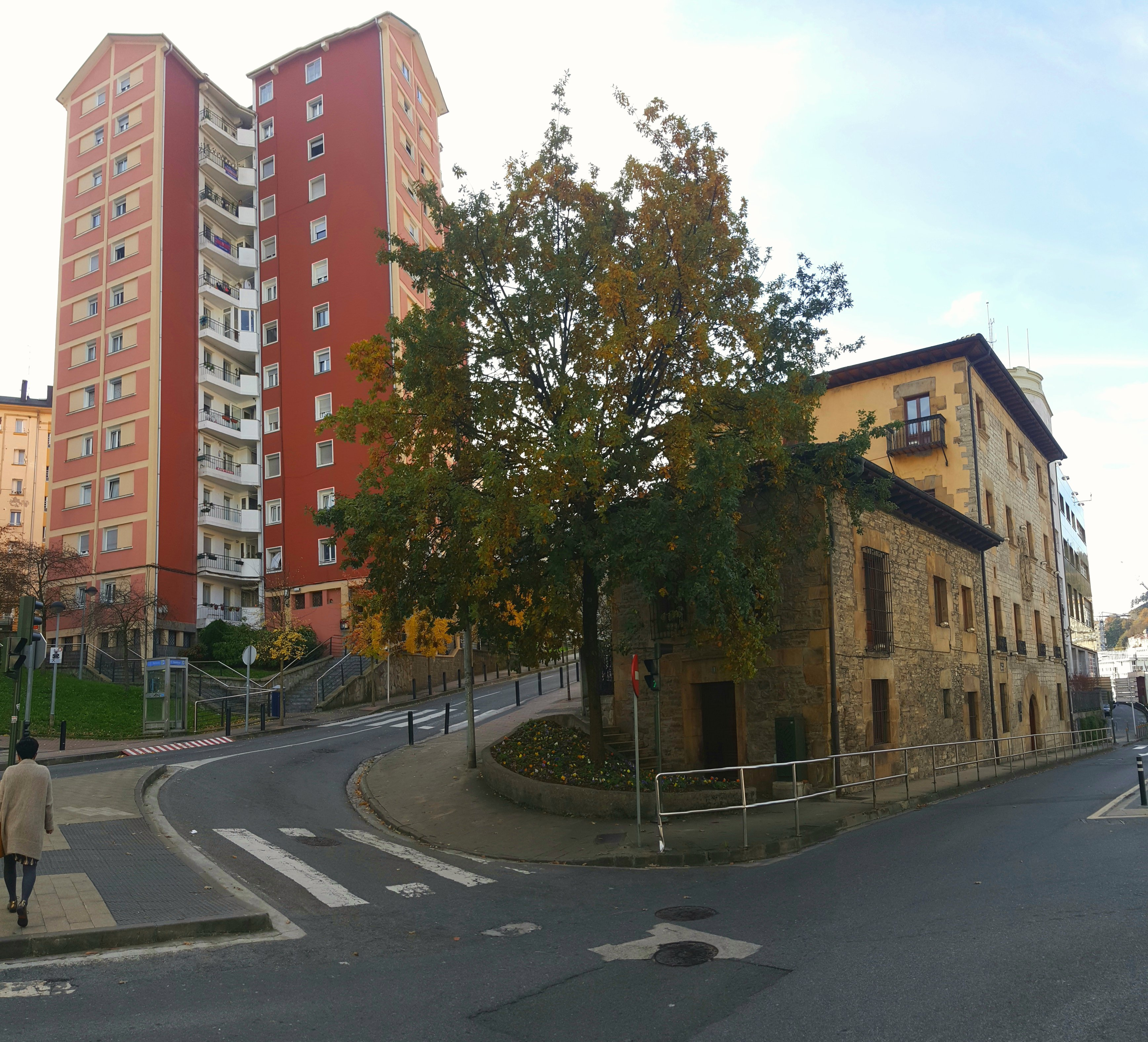
Palace of Markeskua in Eibar. Headquarters of the Basque Summer University.

The Basque Summer University (in Basque and officially: Udako Euskal Unibertsitatea, UEU) is an educational institution created in 1973 for the promotion of the Basque language at the university level. It offers courses, congresses and seminars on a variety of specialised subjects, as well as online postgraduate studies in Basque, in collaboration with several universities and institutions (such as the University of the Basque Country, Mondragon University, Public University of Navarra, and the University of Pau and Pays de l'Adour). It also publishes specialised academic journals and books, and provides digital services related to university-level education and research in Basque.

The UEU has its headquarters in the Palace of Markeskua (Eibar). Although it is called the Basque Summer University, due to the fact that it mainly organised summer courses in its early years, it now works all year round. It is currently a non-profit organisation, recognised as a public utility entity by the Basque Government since 1990.

== History ==
=== Background: No university education in Basque until 1972 ===
After examining the continuing historical regression of the geographical environment where Basque was spoken, the linguist Wilhem von Humboldt predicted in 1809 that this language might disappear in less than a century from the list of living languages.

The social, economic, political and cultural processes set in motion by industrialisation and liberalism during the 19th century led to an even greater decline in Basque. As a fact, it suffices to say that Basque remained on the margin of the school, where even its use became forbidden.

Among the initiatives that emerged in the 20th century to deal with the risk of the disappearance of Basque are the creation of the Society of Basque Studies and the Royal Academy of the Basque Language (Euskaltzaindia) in 1919 and the creation of Ikastolas (schools in Basque), initially in the 1930s and later in the 1960s.

=== Background: creation of the unified Basque language in 1968 ===
Basque, which has 7 main dialects, did not have a standard model of writing until 1968, when Euskaltzaindia laid the foundations of the unified Basque (in Basque batua). Historically, apart from specific and brief exceptions, until then there had never been any training in Basque at university level and in 1972 it was still impossible to study any university degree or even any subject in Basque.

=== Creation of the UEU in 1973 ===
In this context, the history of the UEU began in the Basque Weeks organised in Bayonne during the years 1970–1972. Seeing the success of these days and the discourse given by the mathematician Carlos Santamaría Ansa on the need to create a Basque University, the Euskaldunen Biltzarra, Ikas and Fededunak associations decided to organise summer courses in 1973 with the support of Euskaltzaindia. Similar initiatives that already existed for Catalan and Occitan served as antecedents and references; for example, the Universitat Catalana d'Estiu had been in operation since 1968. Joxe Azurmendi was one of the founders.

The first two editions of the UEU (1973 and 1974) were held in St. Jean de Luz and the next two (1975 and 1976) in Ustaritz.

=== Summer courses in Pamplona (1977–1999) ===
In 1977 the summer courses of the UEU moved to Pamplona, becoming year after year the meeting point that allowed the training of teachers and the creation of materials that were incorporated in the offer of new subjects of the official universities. Over the years, it offered between 40 and 50 summer courses each year. For example, in 1995 it offered 45 courses distributed in 26 departments; in total there were 750 teaching hours, in classes, practices, seminars and outings, with more than 650 participants. Annually, UEU published an average of 10 books. The number of teachers and students who worked in Basque at university level in that year would not exceed 4,000 people, and of all of them more than 650 participated in the UEU, this being proof of the success and contribution of these courses, in spite of the limited economic resources it had.

=== Present situation ===
Since 1999 these university level courses began to develop not only in summer and in Pamplona, but also throughout the year and in multiple locations. After almost 50 years, thanks to this social process promoted and led by the UEU, it has been possible to take some significant steps in the inclusion of Basque in the university. For example, in 2019 almost all university degrees can also be studied in Basque at one of the universities in the Basque Country; more than 400 books have been published in Basque on 27 university disciplines; congresses are regularly organised in Basque for professionals and academics... The UEU collaborates and offers university courses with the other universities in the Basque Country: the University of the Basque Country, the University of Mondragón, the University of Deusto, the Public University of Navarra, and the University of Pau and Pays de l'Adur.

The UEU is currently headquartered in the Markeskua Palace (Eibar) and has 1,200 members. It organises training in Basque at university level in different formats: postgraduate courses, specialised courses, seminars, professional congresses (e.g. Computer Science congresses, Informatikari Euskaldunen Bilkurak), training aimed at teachers and professionals, summer courses and research projects related to the above (master...); it also offers postgraduate studies.

The UEU offers studies in the Basque Autonomous Community, in Navarre and in the French Basque Country, with the UEU's objective being to promote a quality Basque-speaking university throughout the territory where Basque language is used. According to this approach, achieving a university that works in Basque would be a fundamental element so that the forecast made by Humboldt is not fulfilled and Basque continues for many years in the list of living languages. Furthermore, the experience gained with Basque could be a reference for the preservation of other minority languages.

The Rectors of the UEU have been the following: Manex Goihenetxe (1973–1976), Martin Orbe (1976–1983), Baleren Bakaikoa (1983–1987), Inaki Irazabalbeitia (1987–1991), Kepa Altonaga (1991–1996), Mikel Aizpuru (1996–2000), Xabier Isasi (2000–2004), Aitzpea Leizaola (2004–2005), Lore Erriondo (2005–2010), Karmele Artetxe (2010–2014), Iñaki Alegría (2014–2018), Kepa Sarasola (2018–2023) and Aitor Bengoetxea (2023–).

== Publications ==
The UEU published its first book in 1977, since then until 2018 it has published 419, more or less 10 books per year. In the field of book publishing, since its inception the UEU has pursued two objectives: on the one hand, to create a bibliographic infrastructure at university level, and on the other, to refine the terminology and syntax in Basque. The electronic version of most of the more than 400 books published by the UEU are publicly accessible in its digital library Buruxkak.

In addition to books, since 2003 it also publishes academic journals. In 2018 there were four journals: Uztaro, about social sciences and created in 1990; Aldiri, Arkitektura eta abar, about architecture and created in 2009; Osagaiz, about health sciences and created in 2017; and finally Kondaira, about history created in 2003.

== Postgraduate degrees and own degrees ==
Beginning in 2001 and in collaboration with the University of the Basque Country, the UEU has taught 14 own degrees or postgraduates, of which more than 240 students have graduated. For example, in 2018, two courses were given; one on "Translation and technology" and the other on "the use of new technologies in education".

== Training courses ==
Since its creation in 1973, the UEU has delivered more than 1,900 training courses at university level. Online courses began to be delivered in 2003. The first MOOC course (Introduction to Android programming / Android programazioaren hastapenak) took place in 2013. The courses have always been organized from the thematic sections of the UEU, which are the following: Anthropology, Theater, Architecture, Art, Bertsolaritza, Economy, Philosophy, Physics, Glotodidactics, History of Linguistics, Informatics, Translation, Journalism, Chemistry, Climatology and Meteorology, Literature, Mathematics, Music, Natural Sciences, Health Sciences, Pedagogy, Psychology, Sexology, Sociolinguistics, Sociology, and Law.

== Databases and Internet services ==
The UEU has created several databases and Internet services associated with new technologies to respond to training needs and to serve to the university community in Basque:

- Inguma: database on the production of the Basque scientific community. Inguma is a source of information about everything that has been produced orally and in written form in Basque within the academic world since 1968 when the guidelines that led to the unification of the unified Basque language began to be set. In 2018, in total, it included cataloguing. There are both written documents (books, articles, prologues, reviews, translations, critical editions, research projects, doctoral theses) and oral documents summer (conferences, courses, meetings, conferences, subjects).
- Artizarra social network for professionals and researchers.
- Buruxkak. The digital library of the UEU, in 2018 it was offering the digital versions of 390 books from among the 419 published by this entity.
- Otarrea. A compilation of works, reports, notes, and other types of university documents to be shared freely under a Creative Commons license. In 2018 it contained 941 documents distributed by fields in this way: Art and music (4), Humanities (112), Social sciences (333), Engineering and technology (393), Health sciences (19), Applied sciences (2) and Sciences (78).
- Tesiker, PhD theses in Basque. The Tesiker database offers information and access to more than 450 theses that have been published in Basque. This web service is offered from the Basque Government's website after having been collected by the UEU.
- Unibertsitatea.net, meeting place and point of reference for anyone associated with or interested in the university, such as students, teaching staff, researchers, parents, members of the press, etc.university community portal. It publishes news about the Basque university community (including 140 interviews with young researchers) and 10 blogs (economy, Language processing, Art, Environment...).
- Iparrorratza, orientation for university access. The Iparrorratza service offers a counselling service for young people entering university to help them choose their studies.

== Building the community of young researchers ==
Since 2012, the UEU has promoted the creation of a community of young researchers with the aim of promoting multidisciplinary knowledge and exchange. Three of its most relevant activities are the following:

- Ikergazte Congress (in Basque; Iker (research) gazte(young)) This congress has been held every two years since 2015. The number of participants was always greater than 200 and more than 120 articles were presented.
- Txiotesia Competition. With the same objective of promoting mutual knowledge, since 2012, this competition has been organized biennially. Participants describe their doctoral thesis work in just 6 tweets.
- Web portal with interviews, The portal unibertsitatea.net has interviewed more than 120 young researchers.

== Other universities operating in the Basque Country ==
- University of the Basque Country
- University of Pau and the Adour region
- University of Deusto
- National University of Distance Education
- University of Navarre
- Universidad Pública de Navarra
- Mondragon University
- Musikene

== Similar entities operating with other minority languages ==
The following entities are similar to the UEU in that they work to promote the extensive use of a minority language at the university level:

=== Catalan ===
- The Catalan Summer University, Universitat Catalana d'Estiu (UCE) in Catalan language and officially. It is a summer university in Catalan language that takes place annually in the French town of Prades. It was founded in the summer of 1968, just after the events of May 1968.

=== Irish ===
- Fiontar is in Dublin.
- Acadamh na hOllscolaíochta is based in the West of Ireland. Its main campus is in the National University of Ireland in Galway City and it also has three other locations around the West of Ireland. They provide courses at different levels: degrees and postgraduate courses as well as diplomas and other short courses.
- Coláiste na hÉireann (English: "College of Ireland") is a third-level college in Dublin, offering qualifications in the study of translation and the Irish language.

=== Welsh ===
- Coleg Cymraeg Cenedlaethol (in English: Welsh National College). It is known in both Welsh and English simply as Coleg. It was established in 2011 by the Welsh Government to work with universities in Wales to develop Welsh-language courses and resources for students; it also provides and advances Welsh medium courses, scholarship and research in Welsh universities. It works through branches in Welsh Universities to enable more opportunities to study for Welsh medium students in partnership with the universities. Its aim is to increase the number of students who choose to study part or all of their course in Welsh. It funds under- and post-graduate scholarships, sponsors Welsh medium lecturers and supports students who study in Welsh.
- Y Gymdeithas Feddygol (Welsh language medical society) – supports the right to receive healthcare in Welsh and cooperates with any organisation to deliver it. It encourages Welsh medium healthcare studies and gives opportunities to present their work in Welsh. It gives opportunities for students and doctors to network in our annual conferences and the National Eisteddfod.

== See also ==
- University of the Basque Country
- Coleg Cymraeg
