= Pedro Agerre =

Basque writer

Pedro Agerre Azpilkueta
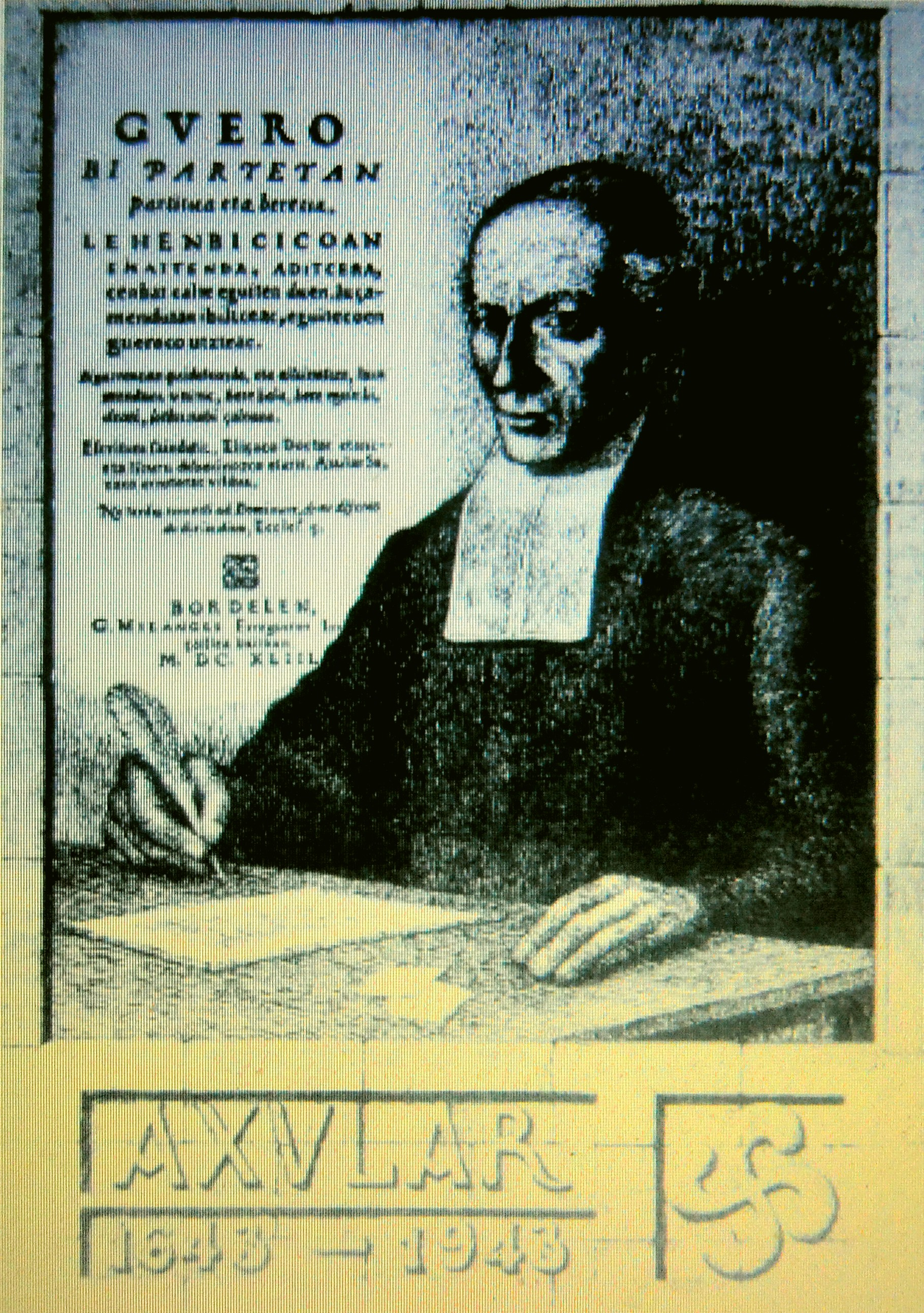
- Born: c. 1556; Urdazubi/Urdax
- Died: 8 April 1644; Sare
- Occupation: Writer
- Writing career
- Pen name: Axular
- Language: Basque
- Notable work: Gero (1643)

Pedro Agerre, best known as Axular, was one of the main Basque writers of the 17th century. His main work was Gero (Later), published in 1643, an ascetic book written with elaborate prose and composed following the traumatic period of the Basque witch trials (1609–1613).

Despite hailing from the house Axular, located in Urdazubi/Urdax (Navarre), he was appointed to the neighbouring parish of Sara (Labourd), where he stood out in his preaching. On the maternal line, he was related to Martin Azpilkueta and Francis Xavier.

== See also ==
- Joan Tartas
