= Bernardo Atxaga =

Basque author (born 1951)

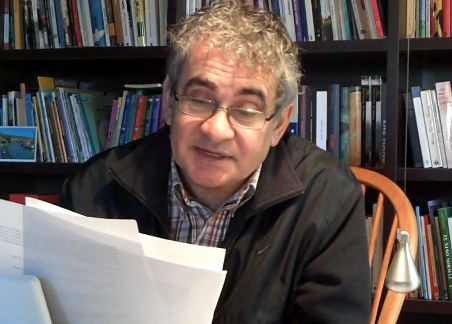
Bernardo Atxaga (2009)

Bernardo Atxaga (born 27 July 1951), pseudonym of Joseba Irazu Garmendia, is a Spanish Basque writer and self-translator.

He is a full member of the Royal Academy of the Basque Language since 2006, in November 2010, he was also named a member of Jakiunde, Academy of Sciences, Arts and Letters.

== Biography ==
Atxaga was born in Asteasu, Gipuzkoa, Basque Country, Spain in 1951. He received a diploma in economics from the university of Bilbao, and studied philosophy at the university of Barcelona. He worked as an economist, bookseller, professor of the Basque language, publisher, and radio scriptwriter until 1980, when he dedicated himself completely to writing.

His first text was published in 1972, in an anthology of Basque authors. His first short story, Ziutateaz ("About The City"), was published in 1976. His first collection of poetry, Etiopia ("Ethiopia"), appeared in 1978. He has written plays, song lyrics, novels and short stories. His book of short stories, Obabakoak ("Individuals and things of Obaba"), published in 1988, won him much fame and several prizes, such as Spain's National Literature Prize. So far, the book has been translated into more than 20 languages.

Atxaga generally writes in the Basque language, Euskara, but translates his works into Spanish as well. Following the example of Obabakoak, several of his other works have been translated into other languages.

== Novels ==
- Obabakoak (1988) (English language edition, translated by Margaret Jull Costa, published in 1992 by Hutchinson, London)
- Behi euskaldun baten memoriak ("Memoirs of a Basque Cow", Pamiela, 1991)
- Gizona bere bakardadean (Pamiela, 1993; "The Lone Man", English version by Margaret Jull Costa, Harvill 1996)
- Zeru horiek (1996; "The Lone Woman", English version by Margaret Jull Costa, Harvill, 1999)
- Soinujolearen semea (2003; "The Accordionist's Son", English version by Margaret Jull Costa, Harvill Secker, 2007)
- Zazpi etxe Frantzian (2009; "Seven Houses in France", English version by Margaret Jull Costa, Harvill Secker, 2011)
- Borrokaria (2012); "The Fighter", English version by Amaia Gabantxo, Etxepare Basque Institute
- Nevadako Egunak (2014); "Nevada Days", English version by Margaret Jull Costa, published 2018 by Graywolf Press)
- Etxeak eta hilobiak (2019); "Houses and Tombs"

== Short stories ==
- Bi anai ("Two Brothers", Erein, 1985)
- Bi letter jaso nituen oso denbora gutxian ( "Two letters", Erein, 1985)
- Henry Bengoa inventarium, Sugeak txoriari begiratzen dionean, Zeru horiek ("Henry bengoa inventarium. When the Snake looks at the Birds, The Lone Woman", Erein, 1995)
- Sara izeneko gizona ("The Man Named Sara", Pamiela, 1996)

== Poetry ==
- Etiopia ("Ethiopia", Pott, 1978),
- Nueva Etiopia ("New Ethiopia", Detursa, 1997)

== Children's books ==
- Chuck Aranberri dentista baten etxean ("Chuck Aranberri At a Dentist", Erein, 1985)
- Nikolasaren abenturak, Ramuntxo detektibe ("Adventures of Nicholas, Ramuntxo Detective", Elkar 1979)
- Siberiako ipuin eta kantak ("Stories and Songs of Siberia", Erein)
- Jimmy Potxolo, Antonino apreta, Asto bat hipodromoan, Txitoen istorio, Flannery eta bere astakiloak (Elkar)
- Xolak badu lehoien berri (Erein, 1995),
- Xola eta basurdeak ("Xola and the Wild Boars", Erein 1996) - won the Basque Children's Literature Prize en 1997
- Mundua eta Markoni ("The World and Markoni", BBK fundazioa, 1995)

== Other works ==
- Ziutateaz (1976)
- 'Lekuak (2005)

== See also ==
- Koldo Izagirre
