= List of people from the Basque Country =

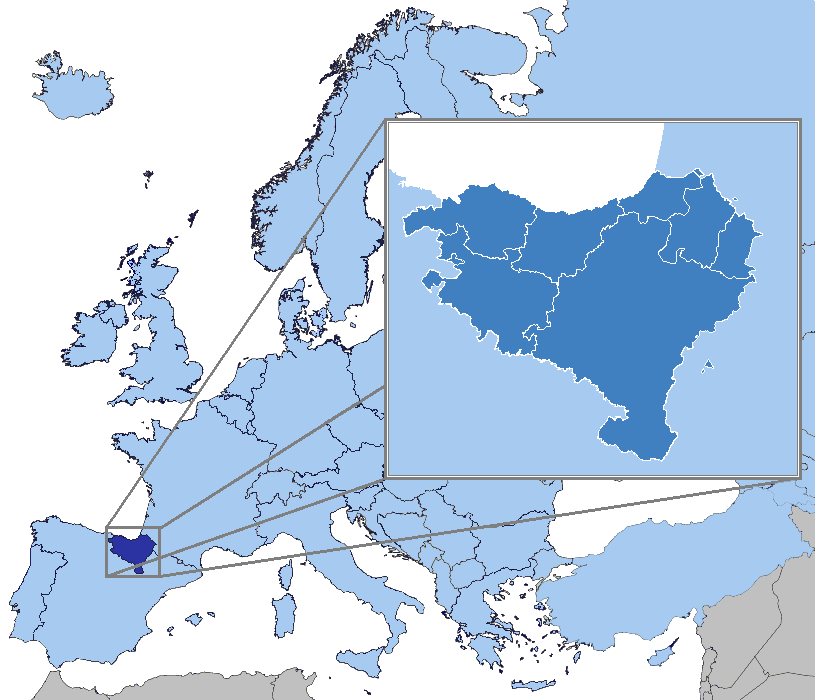
Location of the Basque Country in Europe

This is a list of notable Basque people. For this purpose, people considered are those hailing from the extended Basque Country (includes the Basque Autonomous Community, the French Basque Country and Navarre).

In particular

- born or resident in the Basque Country, unless self-identifying as not Basque (e.g. people self-identifying as Spanish or French rather than Basque.)
- people born outside the Basque Country of Basque ancestry that either speak Basque or self-identify as being of Basque stock.

This list does not contain people outside the Basque Country who happen to have one or more Basque surnames. For people of Basque ancestry in general, please see People with Basque ancestors.

== In the arts ==
- Anabel Alonso, actress.
- Tomas Arana, actor.
- Montxo Armendáriz, filmmaker.
- Aurelio Arteta, writer and painter.
- Juanma Bajo Ulloa, filmmaker.
- Cristóbal Balenciaga, fashion designer.
- Ricardo Baroja, painter, writer and engraver.
- Nestor Basterretxea, painter, sculptor and filmmaker.
- Camren Bicondova, actress.
- Bernard Blancan, actor.
- Eduardo Chillida, sculptor.
- Juan de Echevarría, painter.
- Baltasar de Echave, painter.
- Hector Elizondo, actor.
- Victor Erice, film director.
- Karra Elejalde, actor.
- Jacob Elordi, actor.
- Marta Etura, actress.
- Jose Etxenagusia, painter.
- Menchu Gal, painter.
- Ibn Gharsiya, Basque Muslim poet.
- Adolfo Guiard, painter.
- Barbara Goenaga, actress.
- Alejandro González Iñárritu, filmmaker.
- Javier Gurruchaga, singer and showman.
- Miren Ibarguren, actress.
- Agustín Ibarrola, painter.
- Maite Idirin, singer
- Álex de la Iglesia, filmmaker.
- Adam Irigoyen, actor and singer.
- Itziar Ituño, actress.
- Francisco Iturrino, painter.
- Lucía Lacarra, dancer.
- Alfredo Landa, actor.
- Carmen Larrabeiti, actress.
- Guillermo Larrazábal, stained glass artist.
- Jesús Mari Lazkano, painter.
- John Leguizamo, actor.
- Rebeca Linares, pornographic actress.
- Paul Mayeda Berges, screenwriter.
- Julio Médem, film director.
- Antonio Mercero, film director.
- Rafael Moneo, architect.
- Najwa Nimri, actress.
- Jorge Oteiza, sculptor.
- Hayley Orrantia, actress.
- Paco Rabanne, fashion designer.
- Pierre Richard-Willm, sculptor.
- Dolores del Río, actress.
- Henry Roussel, actor
- Blanquita Suárez, actress and singer.
- Natalia Tena, actress.
- Unax Ugalde, actor
- Eduardo Úrculo, sculptor.
- Jenaro de Urrutia Olaran, painter.
- Achille Zo, painter.
- Ignacio Zuloaga, painter.
- Iván Zulueta, film director
- Daphne Zuniga, actress.

== Astronauts ==
- Léopold Eyharts, astronaut.

== Business people ==
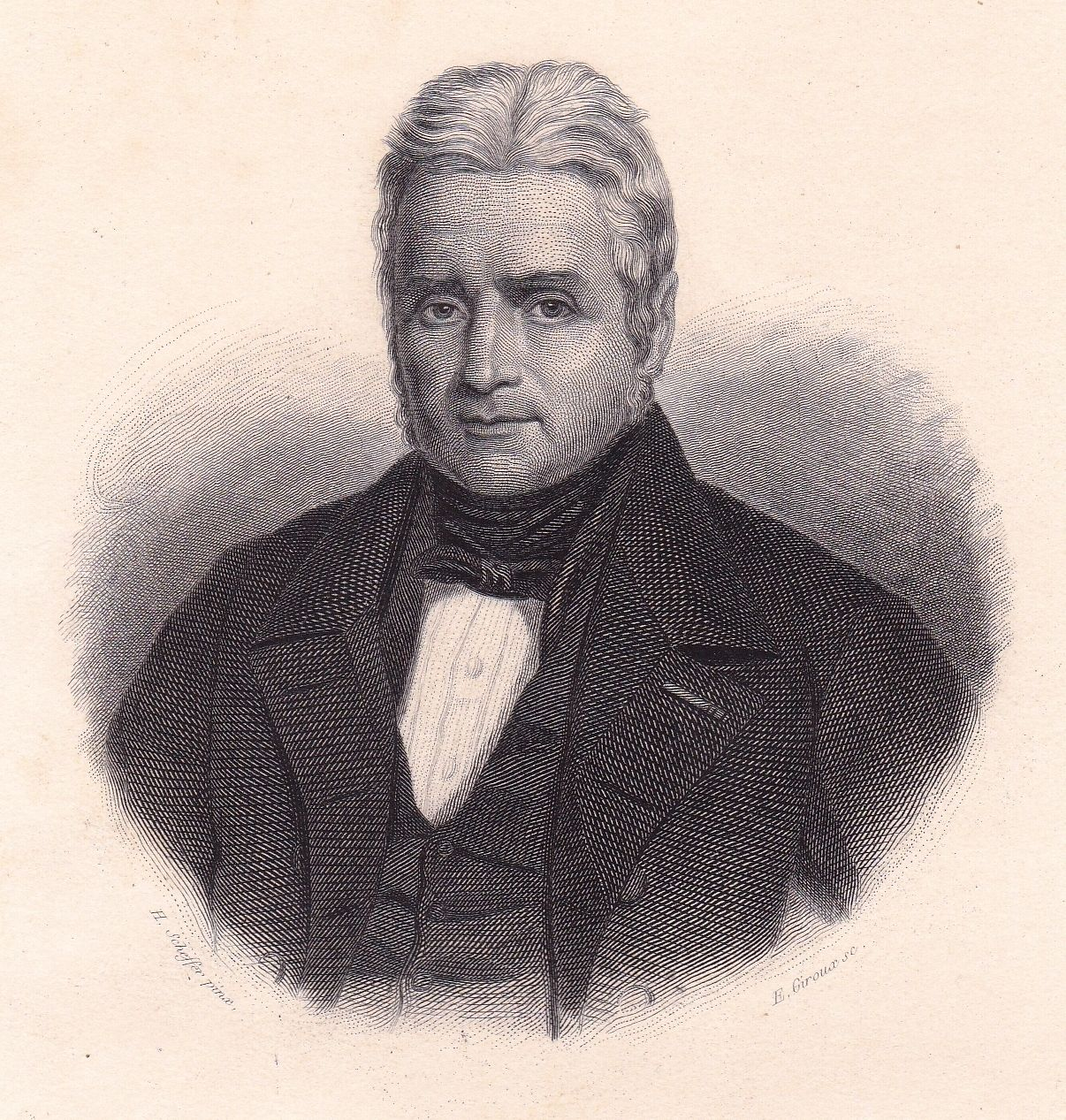
Jacques Laffitte

- Dominique Amestoy, banker, founder of Farmers and Merchants Bank.
- José María Arizmendiarrieta, founder of the Mondragón cooperatives.
- John Arrillaga, real estate businessman, Silicon Valley.
- Jacques Bergerac, actor, and business executive with Revlon.
- François Cabarrus, adventurer and Spanish financier.
- Cristina Garmendia
- José Ignacio Goirigolzarri, president of Bankia.
- Roberto Goizueta, chief executive officer of Coca-Cola.
- Simón Iturri Patiño, business magnate.
- Casilda Iturrizar, businessperson and philanthropist.
- Jacques Laffitte, banker and politician.
- Miguel Leonis
- Elías Querejeta, screenwriter and film producer.
- Joseph A. Unanue, businessman, president of Goya Foods.
- Enrique Zobel y de Ayala, Filipino industrialist, patriarch of the Zobel de Ayala family.

== Chefs ==
- Karlos Arguiñano
- Juan Mari Arzak
- Nieves Barragán Mohacho
- Martin Berasategui
- Luis Irizar

== Clergy ==
- Antonio Añoveros Ataún
- Pedro Arrupe
- Martín de Azpilicueta
- Saint Valentine Berriochoa
- Saint Candida Maria of Jesus
- Ignacio Ellacuría
- Roger Etchegaray
- Saint Fermin
- Michel Garicoïts
- Saint Domingo Ibáñez de Erquicia
- Saint Ignatius of Loyola
- Martín Ignacio de Loyola
- Marcelino Olaechea
- Francisco de Vitoria
- Saint Francis Xavier
- José Maria de Zalvidea
- Juan de Zumárraga

== Educators ==
- Daniela Albizu (1936-2015), Basque-language teacher, writer, and councillor
- Elbira Zipitria (1906–1982), innovative Spanish-Basque educator promoting use of the Basque language

== Explorers ==
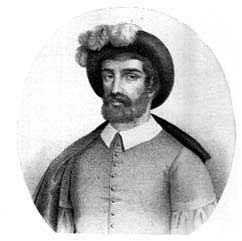
Juan Sebastián Elcano

- Lope de Aguirre
- Pascual de Andagoya
- Juan Bautista de Anza
- Domingo de Bonechea
- Juan Sebastián Elcano
- Alonso de Ercilla
- Martín García Óñez de Loyola
- Adrián de Moxica
- Juan de Garay
- Francisco de Garay
- Martin de Goiti
- Bruno de Heceta
- Martin de Hoyarçabal
- Francisco de Ibarra
- Miguel López de Legazpi
- Domingo Martínez de Irala
- Juan Ortiz de Zárate
- Cristóbal de Oñate
- Martín Ruiz de Gamboa
- Andrés de Urdaneta
- José de Urrutia
- Martín de Ursúa
- Pedro de Ursúa

== Historical figures ==
- Bahlul Ibn Marzuq, Basque Muslim rebel.
- Berengaria of Navarre, Queen of England.
- Count Cassius, founder of Banu Qasi dynasty.
- Vicente Emparán, 19th century Capitan General of Venezuela
- Martin Guerre, historical French victim of identity theft.
- Jon Manteca, activist.
- Queen Máxima of the Netherlands
- Musa ibn Musa al-Qasi, ruler of Banu Qasi dynasty.
- Eva Perón, First Lady of Argentina.
- Jean Vrolicq, Basque whaler.

== Journalists ==
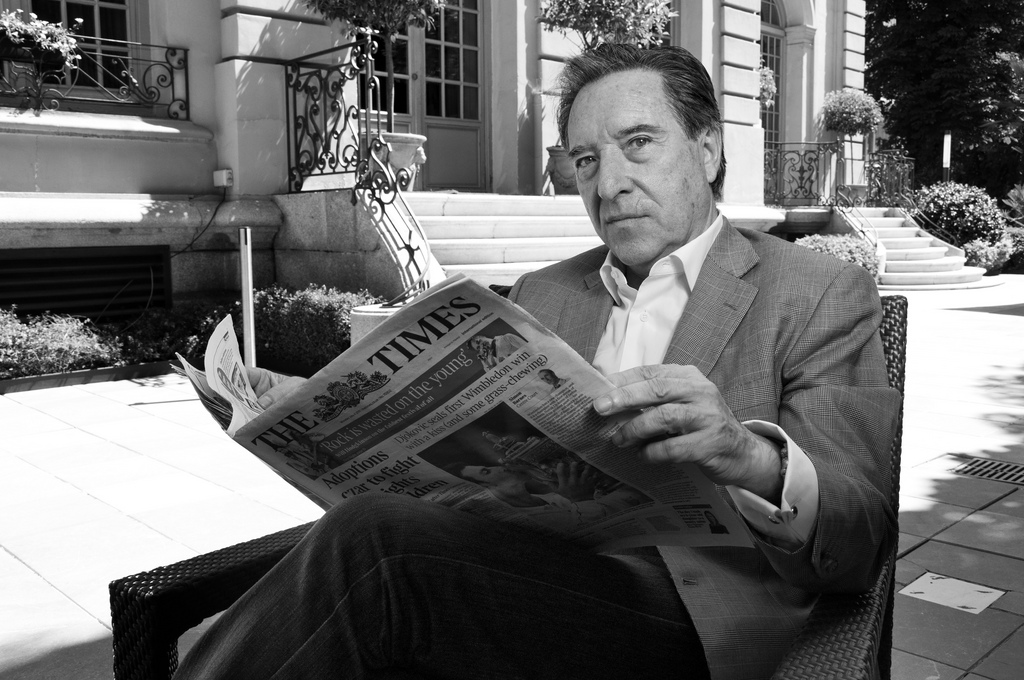
Iñaki Gabilondo

- Manuel Aznar Zubigaray
- François-Régis Bastide
- Ana Blanco
- Pedro Erquicia
- Estíbaliz Gabilondo
- Iñaki Gabilondo
- Leontxo García
- Ramón García
- Christophe Hondelatte
- José María Íñigo
- Iker Jiménez
- Javier Nart
- Miguel de la Quadra-Salcedo
- Alfredo Urdaci

== Military figures ==
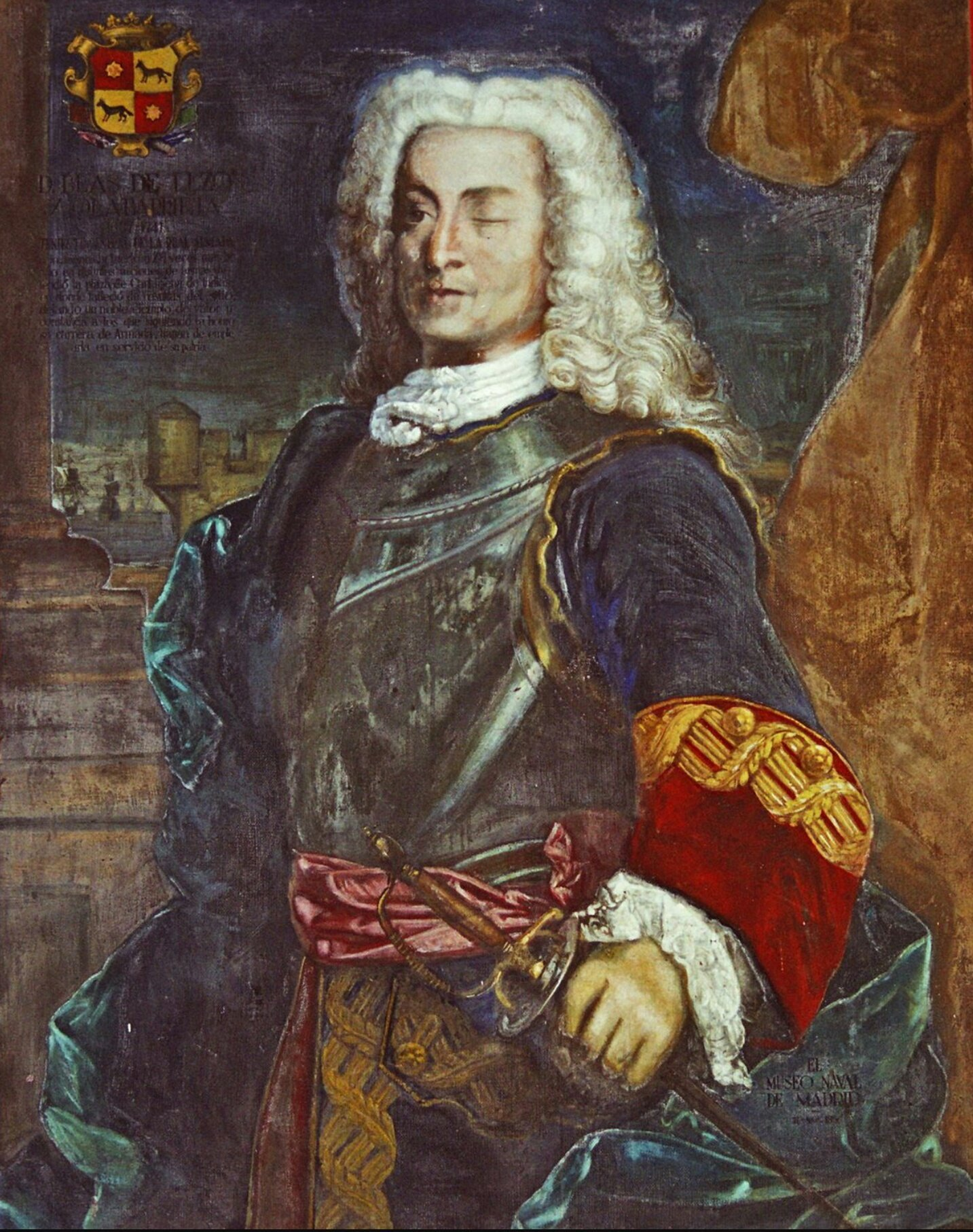
Admiral Blas de Lezo

- Carlos de Amésquita
- Jeffrey Amestoy
- José de Armendáriz
- Alfredo Arrieta
- Simon Bolivar
- Cosme Damián de Churruca y Elorza
- Michael Echanis
- Vicente Emparan
- Catalina de Erauso
- José Gregorio Esparza
- Andrés García Calle
- Jean Lafitte
- Martín García Óñez de Loyola
- Antonio de Gaztañeta
- Jean Isidore Harispe
- Blas de Lezo
- Augusto Pérez Garmendia
- Rubén Ruiz Ibárruri
- Pedro Antonio Olañeta
- José Solchaga
- Enrique Gorostieta
- Juan de Urbieta
- Rafael Urdaneta
- Tomás de Zumalacárregui

== Models ==
- Garbiñe Abasolo
- Lorena Bernal
- Yolande Betbeze
- Jon Kortajarena
- Sheila Marquez
- Agnès Souret

== Musicians ==
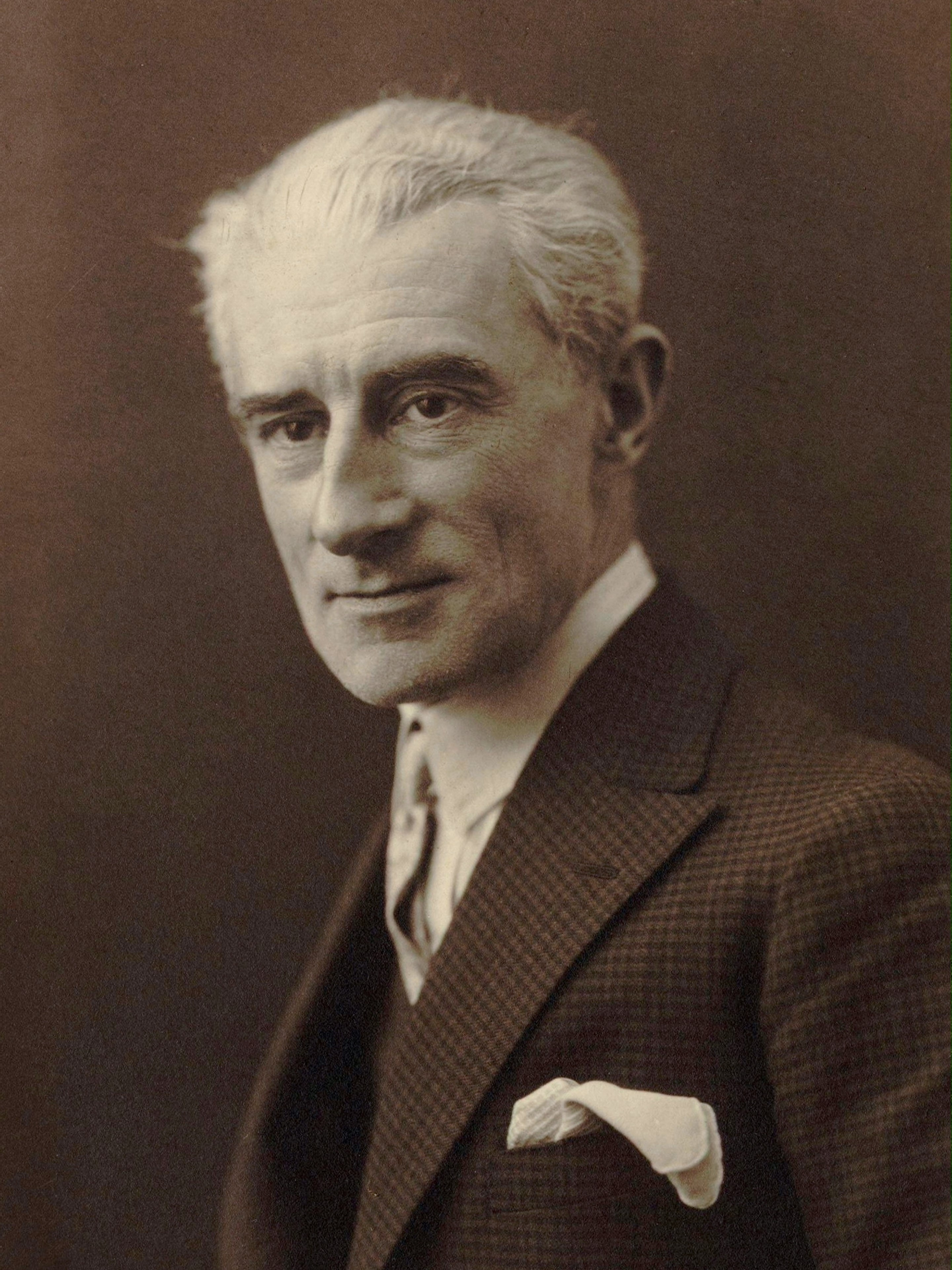
Maurice Ravel

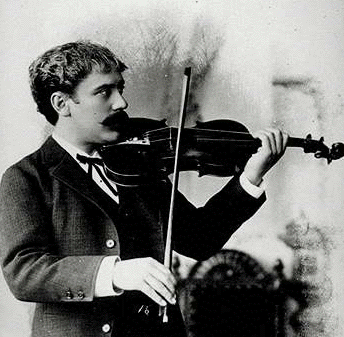
Pablo de Sarasate

- Juan Aguirre, musician
- Uxue Alberdi, bertsolari and writer
- Miren Amuriza, bertsolari and writer
- Juan de Anchieta, composer
- Tom Araya, musician
- David Archuleta, singer
- Maite Arruabarrena (born 1964), operatic singer
- Javier Bello-Portu, composer
- Carmelo Bernaola, 20th century composer
- Cedric Bixler-Zavala, singer
- Manu Chao, musician
- Juan Crisóstomo Arriaga, composer
- Aita Donostia, composer
- Federico Elizalde, Filipino jazz bandleader
- Pepita Embil, soprano
- Mikel Erentxun, singer
- Anne Etchegoyen, singer
- Iosu Expósito, singer
- Cesáreo Gabaráin, songwriter
- Julián Gayarre, singer
- Jesús Guridi, composer
- Alberto Iglesias, composer, twice nominated for Oscar
- Rafael Anton Irisarri, composer
- José Iturbi, composer, pianist
- Pedro Iturralde, musician
- Lauren Jauregui, singer
- Mikel Laboa, singer-songwriter
- Benito Lertxundi, musician
- Luis Mariano, singer
- Leire Martínez, singer-songwriter
- Carlos Mena, opera singer
- Amaia Montero, singer-songwriter
- Fermin Muguruza, singer-songwriter
- Roland Orzabal, musician, singer-songwriter, Tears for Fears band
- Maurice Ravel, composer
- Inma Shara, orchestral conductor
- Pablo de Sarasate, composer
- Pablo Sorozábal, composer
- Álex Ubago, singer
- José María Usandizaga, composer
- Sebastian de Yradier y Salaverri, composer
- Nicanor Zabaleta, musician
- Amaia Zubiria (born 1947), pop singer

== Philosophers ==
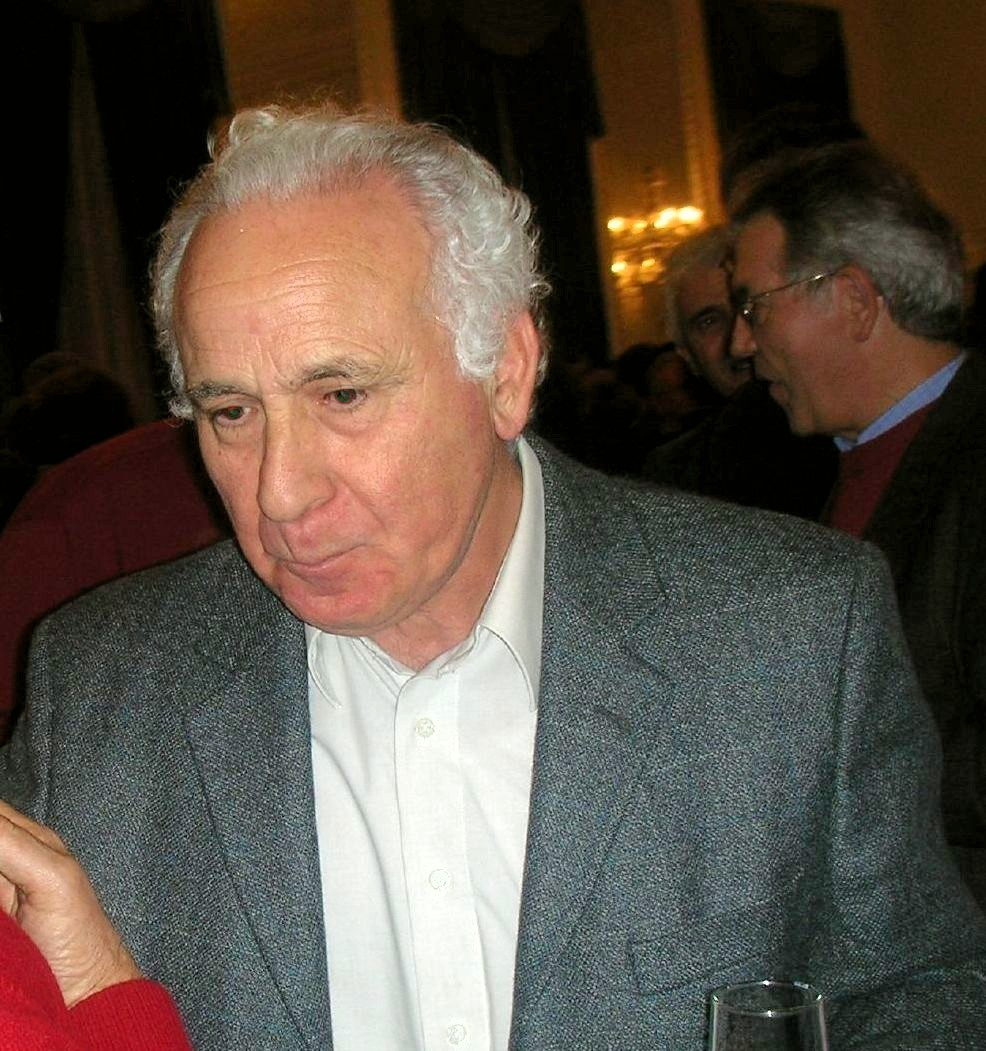
Joxe Azurmendi

- Joxe Azurmendi (1941–2025)
- Alain Etchegoyen (1951–2007)
- John Etchemendy (born 1952)
- Ángel Gabilondo (born 1949)
- Juan Huarte de San Juan (1530–1588)
- Pedro Hurtado de Mendoza (1578–1641)
- Antenor Orrego (1892–1960)
- Fernando Savater (born 1947)
- Miguel de Unamuno (1864–1936)
- Xavier Zubiri (1898–1983)

== Political figures ==
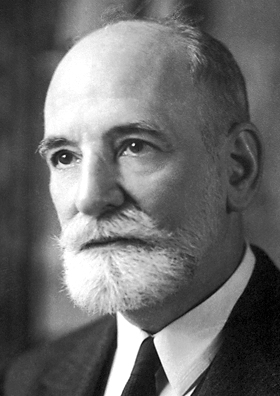
René Cassin

- José Antonio Aguirre, lehendakari during the Spanish Civil War.
- Sabino Arana, father of Basque nationalism.
- José Antonio Ardanza Garro, lehendakari (1985-1999).
- José María de Areilza, politician and diplomat.
- José Luis de Arrese, leading politician with Falange.
- Xabier Arzalluz, significant PNV figure in the late 20th century.
- Uxue Barkos, journalist and president of Navarre 2015-2019
- Doris Benegas, lawyer and political activist on the left.
- Esteban de Bilbao Eguía, Francoist politician.
- René Cassin, Nobel Peace Prize (1968)
- Pete T. Cenarrusa, US politician, native speaker of Euskera and advocate for Basque culture in Idaho, USA.
- Begoña Errazti, politician in Navarra.
- Carlos Garaikoetxea, former lehendakari.
- Dominique-Joseph Garat, writer and politician.
- Diego de Gardoqui, diplomat.
- Juan José Ibarretxe, former lehendakari.
- Dolores Ibárruri, La Pasionaria.
- José de Iturrigaray, viceroy of New Spain.
- Ramón Jáuregui, PSOE vice-lehendakari
- Jesús María de Leizaola Sánchez, former lehendakari.
- José Félix de Lequerica, Minister of Foreign Affairs of Spain.
- Patxi López, former lehendakari.
- Telesforo de Monzón, founder of Ertzaintza and the Herri Batasuna party.
- Martín de Mujica y Buitrón, Governor of Chile from 1646 to 1649.
- José María Oriol, Francoist politician and businessman.
- Arnaldo Otegi, former leader of the Batasuna party.
- Imanol Pradales, lehendakari from June 2024.
- Ramón Rubial Cavia, Spanish Socialist leader.
- Étienne de Silhouette, Controller-General of Finances under Louis XV.
- Arantza Quiroga, president of the Basque PP.
- Miguel Sanz, president of the autonomous community of Navarre from 1996 to 2011.
- Iñigo Urkullu, lehendakari from 2012-2024.

== Scientists ==
- Antoine-Thomson d'Abbadie, explorer, anthropologist, linguist and astronomer.
- Julian de Ajuriaguerra, neuropsychiatrist and psychoanalyst.
- Gurutzi Arregi, ethnographer.
- José Miguel Barandiaran, anthropologist, paleontologist.
- Juan Ignacio Cirac Sasturain, physicist.
- Armand David, zoologist, botanist.
- F. J. Duarte, physicist and author.
- Fausto Elhúyar and José Elhuyar, physicists.
- Manuel Elizalde, anthropologist.
- Pedro Miguel Etxenike, physicist.
- Pierre Hérigone, mathematician, astronomer.
- Luis Federico Leloir, Nobel prize chemist.
- Mikel Zalbide, linguist.

== Sportspeople ==
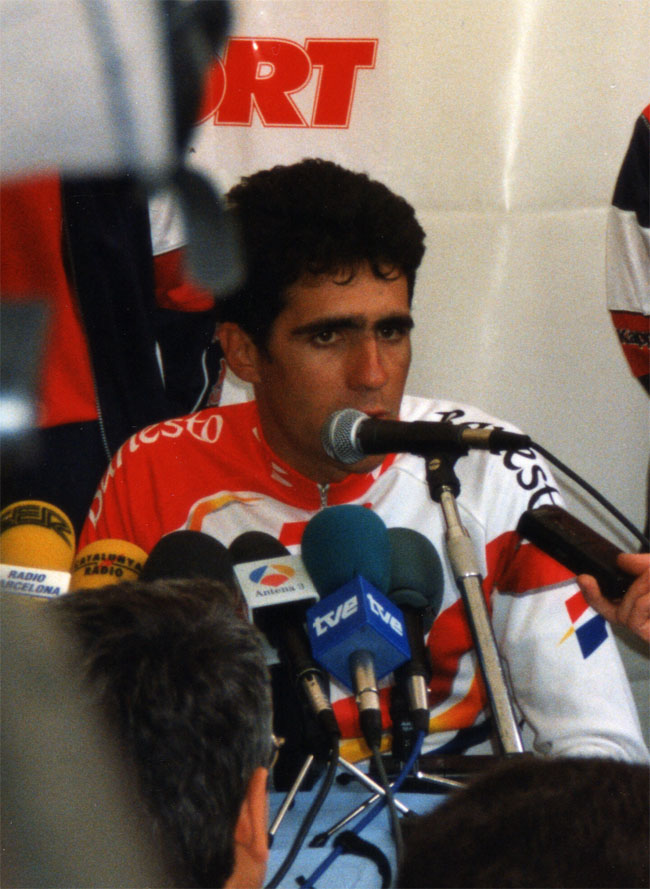
Miguel Indurain

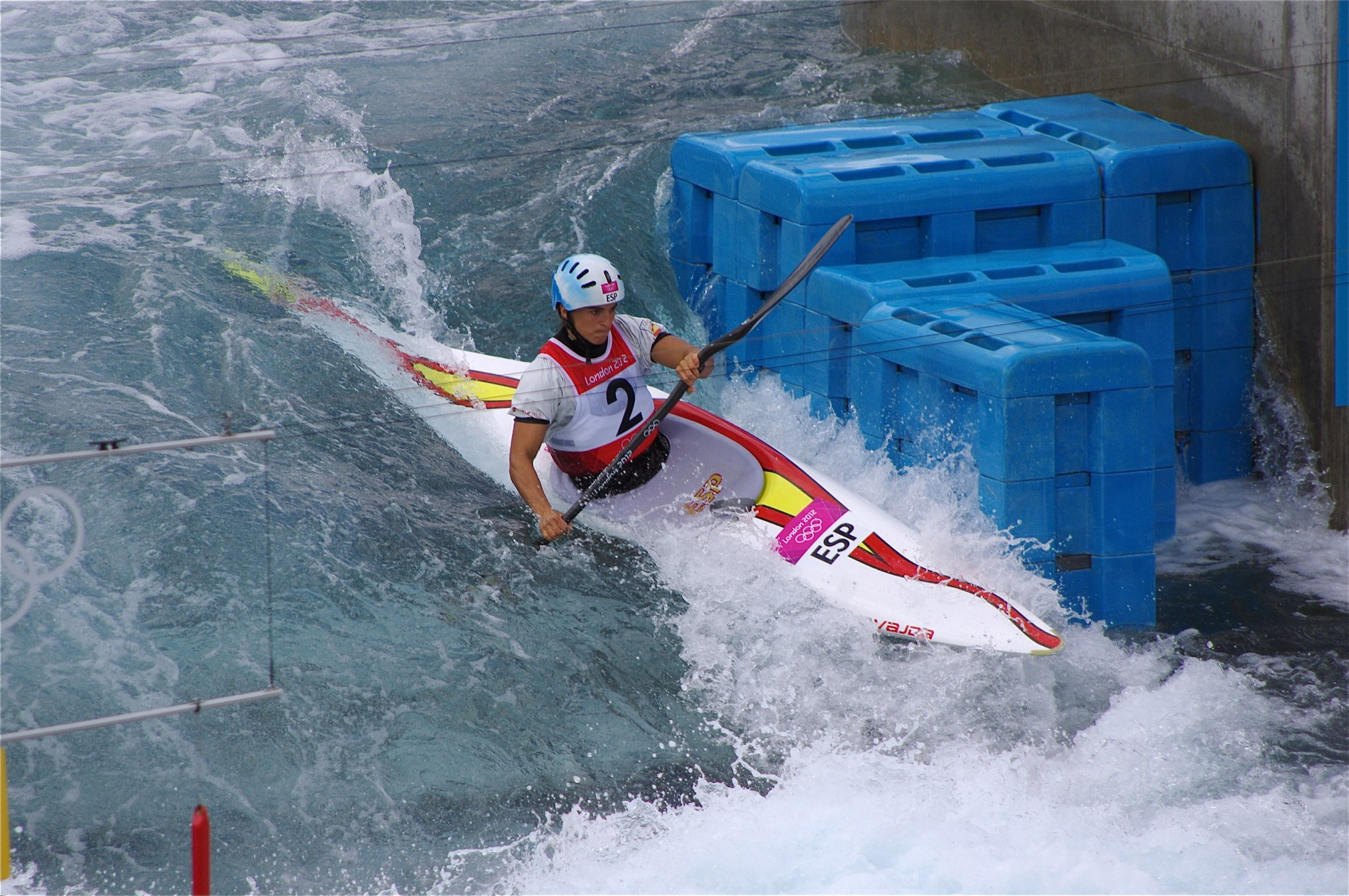
Maialen Chourraut

- Izaskun Aramburu, sprint canoeist
- Virginia Berasategui, triathlete
- Josune Bereziartu, rock climber
- José Biriukov, basketball player
- Frenchy Bordagaray, baseball player
- Maialen Chourraut, slalom canoeist
- Almudena Cid, rhythmic gymnast
- Carlota Ciganda, golfer
- Lucas Eguibar (born 1994), snowboarder
- Ander Elosegi, slalom canoeist
- Gabriel Esparza, taekwondo practitioner
- Andy Etchebarren, baseball player
- Pierre Etchebaster, real tennis player
- Annie Famose (born 1944), alpine skier, 1966 world slalom champion
- Xabier Fernández Gaztañaga, sailor
- Martín Fiz (born 1963), athlete, 1995 marathon world champion
- Shayne Gostisbehere, ice hockey player
- Lorena Guréndez, rhythmic gymnast
- Jimmie Heuga, skier
- Alberto Iñurrategi, mountaineer
- Valeri Kharlamov, ice hockey player
- Tania Lamarca, rhythmic gymnast
- Jim Larranaga, basketball coach
- Luis María Lasúrtegui Berridi, rowing
- Ryan Lochte, swimmer
- Juan Manuel López Iturriaga, basketball player
- Carlos Loyzaga, basketball player
- Estíbaliz Martínez, rhythmic gymnast
- Iker Martínez de Lizarduy, sailor
- Moncho Monsalve, basketball coach
- Teresa Motos, field hockey player
- Juanito Oiarzabal, mountaineer
- José María Olazábal, golfer
- Richard Oribe, paralympic swimmer
- Edurne Pasaban, mountaineer
- María Quintanal, sport shooter
- Jon Rahm, golfer
- Maider Tellería, field hockey player
- Herri Torrontegui, motorcycle racer
- Patxi Usobiaga, sport climber
- Paulino Uzcudun, boxer
- Alejandro Villanueva, american footballer
- Ted Williams, baseball player
- Maite Zúñiga (born 1964), athlete, middle distance runner

=== Cycling ===
- Igor Antón (born 1983)
- Igor Astarloa (born 1976), world champion
- Joseba Beloki (born 1973)
- Pello Bilbao (born 1990)
- Mikel Bizkarra (born 1989)
- Mariano Cañardo (1906-1987)
- Jonathan Castroviejo (born 1987)
- Imanol Erviti (born 1983)
- Omar Fraile (born 1990)
- Francisco Gabica (1937-2014), Vuelta a España winner
- Francisco Galdós (born 1947)
- Juan Manuel Gárate (born 1976)
- Iñaki Gastón (born 1963)
- Aitor González (born 1975), Vuelta a España winner
- Igor González de Galdeano (born 1973)
- Miguel Indurain, (born 1964), 5-time Tour de France winner, 2-time Giro d'Italia winner
- Gorka Izagirre (born 1987)
- Ion Izagirre (born 1989)
- Mikel Landa (born 1989)
- Dalmacio Langarica (1919-1985), Vuelta a España winner
- Guy Lapébie (1916-2010)
- Roger Lapébie (1911-1996), Tour de France winner
- Miguel María Lasa (born 1947)
- Marino Lejarreta (born 1957), Vuelta a España winner
- David López (born 1981)
- Jesús Loroño (1926-1998), Vuelta a España winner
- Egoi Martínez (born 1978)
- Eider Merino (born 1994)
- Mikel Nieve (born 1984)
- Isidro Nozal (born 1977)
- Leire Olaberria (born 1977)
- Abraham Olano (born 1970), Vuelta a España winner
- Aitor Osa (born 1973)
- Unai Osa (born 1975)
- Luis Otaño (born 1934)
- Javier Otxoa (1974-2018)
- Domingo Perurena (born 1943)
- Óscar Rodríguez (born 1995)
- Gregorio San Miguel (born 1940)
- Ane Santesteban (born 1990)
- Romain Sicard (born 1988)
- Joane Somarriba (born 1972), 2-time Giro d'Italia Femminile winner
- Eusebio Vélez (1935-2020)
- Mikel Zarrabeitia (born 1970)
- Haimar Zubeldia (born 1977)

=== Football ===
- Aritz Aduriz (born 1981), former Spanish international
- Xabi Alonso (born 1981), former Spanish international, 2010 World Cup winner, 2008 & 2012 European Championship winner
- Luis Arconada (born 1954), former Spanish international
- Kepa Arrizabalaga (born 1994), Spanish international
- Mikel Arteta (born 1982), former midfielder and manager
- Pako Ayestaran (born 1971), former player and manager
- César Azpilicueta (born 1989), Spanish international
- Philippe Bergeroo (born 1954), former French international, 1984 European Championship winner
- Javier Clemente (born 1950), former Spain manager
- Didier Deschamps (born 1968), former French international, 1998 World Cup winner, 2000 European Championship winner as player & 2018 World Cup winner as France manager
- Unai Emery (born 1971), former player and manager
- Joseba Etxeberria (born 1977), former Spanish international
- José Eulogio Gárate (born 1944), former Spanish international
- Julen Guerrero (born 1974), former Spanish international
- Ander Herrera (born 1989), Spanish international
- José Ángel Iribar (born 1943), former Spanish international, 1964 European Championship winner
- Isidro Lángara (1912-1992), former Spanish international
- Aymeric Laporte (born 1994), French-born Spanish international
- Bixente Lizarazu (born 1969), former French international, 1998 World Cup winner & 2000 European Championship winner
- Fernando Llorente (born 1985), Spanish international, 2010 World Cup winner & 2012 European Championship winner
- Javi Martínez (born 1988), Spanish international, 2010 World Cup winner & 2012 European Championship winner
- Martin Montoya
- Nacho Monreal (born 1986), Spanish international
- Irene Paredes (born 1991), Spanish women's international
- Chus Pereda (1938-2011), former Spanish international, 1964 European Championship winner
- Pichichi (1892-1922), former Spanish international
- Ismael Urzaiz (born 1971), former Spanish international
- Ricardo Zamora, former Spanish international
- Telmo Zarra (1921-2006), former Spanish international
- Ignacio Zoco (1939-2015), former Spanish international, 1964 European Championship winner
- Andoni Zubizarreta (born 1961), former Spanish international

=== Handball ===
- Julen Aguinagalde
- Nely Carla Alberto
- Naiara Egozkue
- Patricia Elorza
- Mateo Garralda
- Elisabeth Pinedo
- Iker Romero
- Iñaki Urdangarin

=== Pelota ===
- José de Amézola y Aspizúa
- Atano III (Mariano Juaristi)
- Oinatz Bengoetxea
- Pierre Etchegaray
- Juan Martínez de Irujo
- Victor Iturria
- Aimar Olaizola
- Julián Retegi

=== Rugby ===
- Diego Aguirre
- Lisandro Arbizu
- Lise Arricastre
- Serge Blanco
- Pépito Elhorga
- Jean-Baptiste Élissalde
- Jean Etcheberry
- Imanol Harinordoquy
- Raphaël Ibañez
- Christophe Lamaison
- Camille Lopez
- Diego Ormaechea
- Francisco Puertas Soto

=== Tennis ===
- Manuel Alonso (1895-1984)
- Alberto Berasategui (born 1973)
- Jean Borotra (1898-1994), 4-time Grand Slam singles winner
- Garbiñe Muguruza (born 1993), 2-time Grand Slam singles winner

== Writers ==
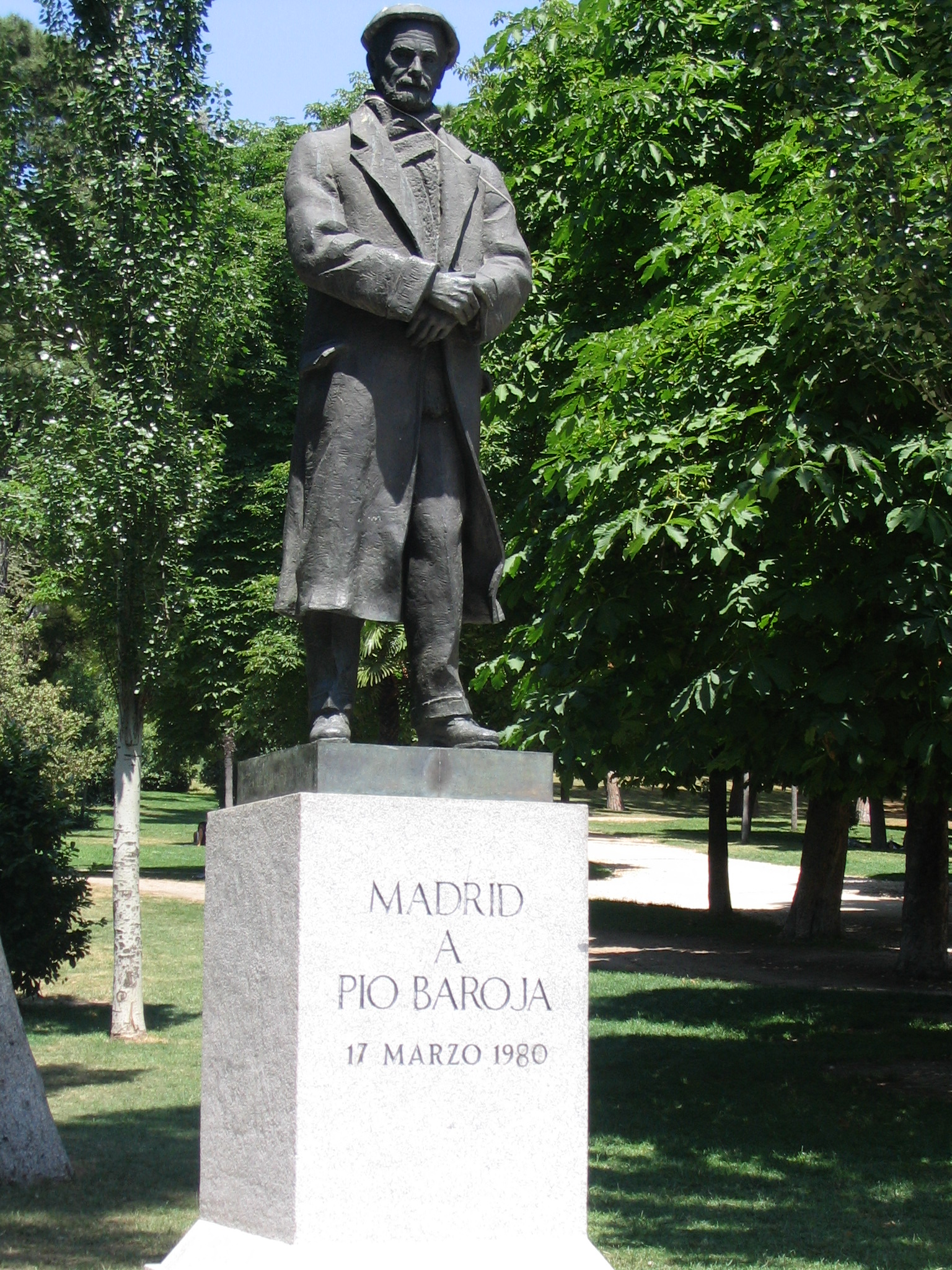
Pío Baroja

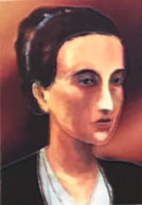
Bizenta Mogel

- Pedro Agerre Axular
- Ignacio Aldecoa
- Fernando Aramburu
- Gabriel Aresti
- Bernardo Atxaga
- Resurrección María de Azkue
- Pío Baroja
- J. J. Benítez
- Arantxa Urretabizkaia
- Frank Bergon
- Itxaro Borda
- Gabriel Celaya
- Marie Darrieussecq
- Lucía Etxebarría
- Bernard Etxepare
- Espido Freire
- Jesús Galíndez
- Lucila Godoy Alcayaga
- Jon Juaristi
- Robert Laxalt
- Joanes Leizarraga
- Ramiro de Maeztu
- Miren Agur Meabe
- José Manterola
- Koldo Mitxelena
- Bizenta Mogel
- Juan Antonio Mogel
- Arnauld de Oihenart
- Nikolas Ormaetxea
- Joan Perez de Lazarraga
- Rafael Sánchez Mazas
- Joseba Sarrionandia
- Txillardegi
- Miguel de Unamuno
- Kirmen Uribe
- Agustin Xaho
