= Euskaltzaindia =

Official academic language regulatory institution for the Basque language

Euskaltzaindia Royal Academy of the Basque Language Real Academia de la Lengua Vasca Académie de la Langue Basque
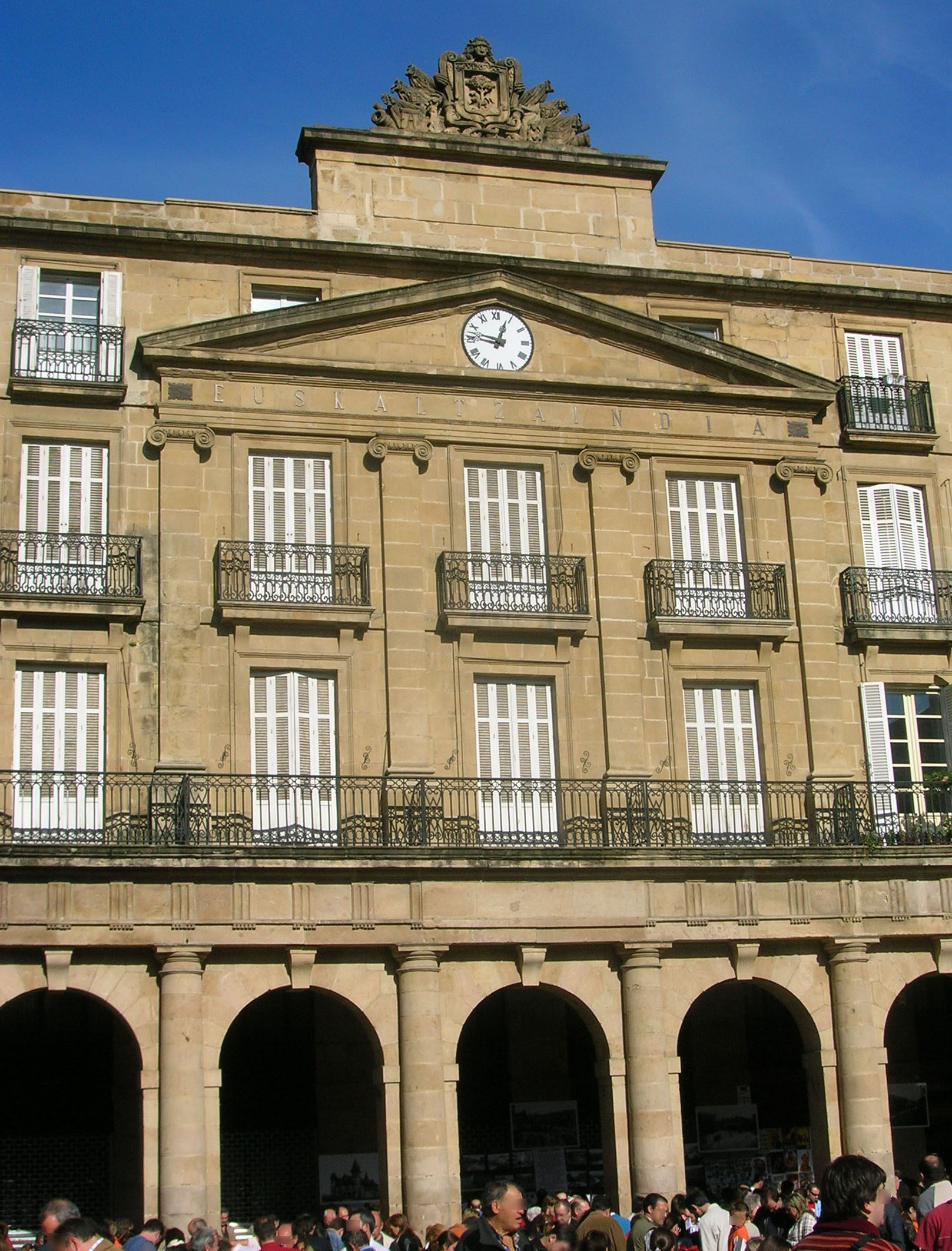
- Formation: 1919
- Headquarters: 15 Plaza Berria, Bilbao, Biscay, Spain
- Region served: Basque Country
- Official language: Basque
- Chairman: Andres Urrutia
- Affiliations: Euskerazaintza, Royal Spanish Academy
- Website: Euskaltzaindia website

Euskaltzaindia (lit. 'group of keepers of the Basque language'; Spanish: Real Academia de la Lengua Vasca, lit. 'Royal Academy of the Basque Language'; French: Académie de la Langue Basque, lit. 'Academy of the Basque Language') is the official academic language regulatory institution which watches over the Basque language. It conducts research, seeks to protect the language, and establishes standards of use. It is under the patronage of the Spanish monarchy (like the Real Academia Española) and has the status of a public non-profit organisation in France.

== Creation ==
The Euskaltzaindia was established within the context of the Basque Renaissance (Euskal Pizkundea, 1876–1936) in the framework provided by the Congress of Basque Studies held in Oñati in 1918, at a time when the Basque language was being proclaimed as a central cultural value to be protected and promoted. Important figures from the 19th century had already demanded the setting-up of an academy in defence of the language (Ulibarri, 1832; Aizkibel, 1856; d'Abbadie and Duvoisin, 1862; Jose Manterola, 1880 and Artiñano, 1886), and it was during the first two decades of the 20th century when various entities – some scientific and others more popular ones – also emphasized the need for its immediate creation. The scientific contributions of major foreign figures (Louis Lucien Bonaparte, Van Eys, Hugo Schuchardt, Dodgson, Gavel, etc.) and from within the country (Arturo Campión, Azkue, Urquijo, etc.), as well as the express demand on the part of Basque language loyalist organisations (for example, Eusko Esnalea) created a favourable climate for the public authorities to take on the task of setting up the academy.

The first initiative in this direction came from the provincial government of Biscay, which the other three provincial governments in the peninsular part of the Basque Country subsequently joined (1918), with articles of association being approved and Euskaltzaindia being legally constituted in October 1919. One year later its journal Euskera was launched, the official organ for the publication of its rules and research work, which has survived to the present day.

The current internal structure and organisation can be summarised as follows: the academy is governed by a ruling body composed of the chairman, deputy chairman, secretary and treasurer. The heads of the Research and Watchdog Sections are also members. Plenary sessions must be held at least once a month. Under current rules the academy has 24 full members and an unlimited number of associate members. The academy is present throughout the area where Basque is used, with a head office in Bilbao and regional offices in Bayonne, San Sebastián, Pamplona and Vitoria-Gasteiz.

== History ==
In the decade and a half prior to the Spanish Civil War (1919–1936), the academy managed to consolidate itself as an institution and set about its project of promoting the birth of a standard literary language, although it was unable to provide a precise, solid academic formulation for that aim. On the other hand, its work in that period contributed decisively to a better understanding of the language through Resurrección María de Azkue's studies (Euskal Morfologia, 1923–1934) and far reaching surveys among speakers of the language (Erizkizundi Irukoitza, from 1922 onwards). The journal "Euskera" is a faithful witness to the work carried out at the time.

In 1936 and the years which followed, under the language politics of Francoist Spain the academy's previous activities were reduced to silence until Azkue, with the collaboration of Federico Krutwig, was able to timidly reinitiate academic life at the beginning of the 1950s. The articles of association were reformed in 1954, new full members were elected and from 1956 on the academy started to enjoy a more settled existence both in its internal affairs and in its public conferences and open meetings (first postwar congress: Arantzazu, 1956).

The following decade (1956–1968) coincided with a new generation of collaborators, the increasing introduction of Basque in bilingual non-state schools (ikastolak), the revival of the Basque language press and the first attempts at teaching basic literacy in Basque, among other initiatives.

In 2019, the academy published the Euskal Hiztegi Historiko-Etimologikoa, the first comprehensive historical and etymological Basque dictionary.

== Euskara Batua, unified Basque ==
The Euskaltzaindia has been a vocal and active advocate of the introduction of a unified standard of the Basque language, known as "Euskara Batua", or Unified Basque. Basque has been usually divided into 8 different dialects, varying in their level of mutual intelligibility. The first detailed dialectical analysis was by Louis Lucien Bonaparte. However, many people have seen this as a weakness in the language's fight for survival in a world in which minority languages spoken in states are wiped out by the states' official language. Having been for centuries pressured on both sides by Spanish and French, and under the rule of Franco coming close to extinction, the academy felt the need to create a unified dialect of Basque, so as to give the language a greater chance of survival. Unified Basque was heavily based on the Gipuzkoan dialect, which had the richest literary heritage.

The 1968 Arantzazu Congress laid down the basic guidelines for achieving that objective in a systematic way (lexicon, morphology, declension and spelling). A further step was taken in 1973 with a proposal to establish a standard conjugation.

The debate arising from this new set of standard language rules (1968–1976) did not prevent it from becoming increasingly accepted in teaching, the media, and administration (1976–1983), within the context of burgeoning regional government (Statute of Autonomy in Euskadi, 1979; Improvement of the Charter of Navarre, 1982). Many people, however, continue to oppose the imposition of a single created dialect of Basque.

Euskaltzaindia counsels the Basque administrations wishing to officialize Basque place names. It is funded by the Biscayne, Gipuzkoan, Alavese, Navarrese, Spanish, and French authorities for culture.

== Notable past academicians ==
- Gabriel Aresti
- Antonio Arrue
- Resurreccion Maria Azkue
- Gorka Aulestia
- Jose Migel Barandiaran
- Julio Caro Baroja
- Joan Coromines
- Balendin Enbeita
- Joshua Fishman
- Manex Goihenetxe
- Federiko Krutwig
- Juan Mari Lekuona
- Koldo Mitxelena
- Raimundo Olabide
- José María Sánchez Carrión
- Hugo Schuchardt
- Joan Mari Torrealdai
- Antonio Tovar
- Julio de Urquijo
- Julien Vinson
- Jose Gontzalo Zulaika
- Alan R. King
- Maite Idirin

== Present academicians ==
- Luis Aranberri
- Joxe Austin Arrieta
- Bernardo Atxaga
- Miren Agur Meabe
- Laura Mintegi
- Lourdes Oñederra
- Joseba Sarrionandia
- Miren Azkarate Villar
- Mikel Zalbide
