= Arruabarrena =

Arruabarrena (Spanish pronunciation: [arwaβaˈrena]) is a Basque-language surname of Basque origin. Notable people with the surname include:

- Ignacio de Arruabarrena (born 1997), Uruquayan footballer
- Lara Arruabarrena (born 1992), Spanish tennis player
- Maite Arruabarrena (born 1962), Spanish-Basque opera singer
- Mikel Arruabarrena (born 1983), Spanish footballer
- Rodolfo Arruabarrena (born 1975), Argentine footballer
