= Raimundo Olabide =

The Reverend Raimundo Olabide, S.J.
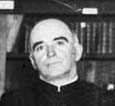
- Raimundo Olabide in 1927

Orders
- Ordination: 1902

Personal details
- Born: Raimundo German Olabide Karrera; March 15, 1869 Vitoria, Alava, Spain
- Died: September 9, 1942 (aged 73) Toulouse, France

Raimundo Germán Olabide Karrera, S.J. (15 March 1869 - Toulouse 9 September 1942) was a Basque Jesuit priest, linguistic and translator. He authored a complete translation of the Bible into the Basque language.

== Life ==
Olabide was born in 1869 in Vitoria, Álava, Spain, to a couple who lived on the Plaza de la Virgen Blanca in the center of the city, where they ran a small business. Though both his parents were ethnically Basque, his mother had been born and raised in Madrid, and her native tongue was Castilian. As a result, he grow up speaking only that language. When he came of age, his parents sent him to the Jesuit college in Urduña.

In 1884, at the age of 15, Olabide entered the Society of Jesus which operated the school. He then pursued his philosophical and theological studies at the Jesuit communities of Veruela Abbey and Tortosa. In the course as his formation with the Society, he worked as a teacher in Valladolid, Oña, Gijón and Salamanca. He was ordained a Catholic priest in 1902.

It was while studying at the University of Salamanca in 1911 that Olabide came across a grammar book of Basque written by Arturo Campión, a leading proponent of Basque nationalism. It was then finally that, at the age of 27, he began to learn his ancestral tongue, to the study and promotion of which he dedicated the rest of his life. The noted Basque lexographer who had published a classic dictionary of the language in 1904, Resurrección María de Azkue, later commented that Olabide seemed to know his work better than he himself, the author, did.

== Translator ==
In 1914 Olabide published his first translation into that language, that of the noted Spiritual Exercises of Ignatius of Loyola, in Basque Loyola'tar Eneko Deunaren Gogo-iñarkunak. Three years later, he published a complete dictionary of human anatomy Giza-soña (The Human Body). His translations became noted for the purity of his language, as he refused to use loanwords from other languages. He was admitted to the Royal Academy of the Basque language in 1919 due to his contributions to the revival of the language.

The following year, Olabide published his translation into the Basque of the medieval spiritual classic, Imitation of Christ by Thomas à Kempis, with the title of Kisto'ren antz-bidea. His goal had become the publishing of translations across the entire range of the sciences, so as to advance the use of the language.

Olabide, however, then made the decision to embark on a translation of the Bible. The New Testament took him ten years; it was published in 1931 in Bilbao. After the expulsion of the Jesuits in the course of the Spanish Civil War, he took shelter at the Franciscan Sanctuary of Arantzazu in Oñati, where he devoted himself to the translation of the Old Testament. By chance, he was living in the city of Guernica on 26 April 1937 when the German Luftwaffe conducted its attack on the city. He was able to save his manuscripts from his residence before it was destroyed by fire and escaped to the nearby town of Kanala, where he was given refuge in the rectory of the town. He then left Spain and settled in Toulouse, France, where he died as the result of an accident on the streets of the city.

The translation on which Olabide had been working at the town of his death was completed by a fellow Jesuit, Patxi Etxeberria, who was brought back from missionary service in Taiwan for this effort. It was published in 1958.
