= Manteca =

Manteca may refer to:

- The Spanish word for lard

== People ==
- Albert Manteca (born 1988), Spanish footballer
- Jon Manteca (1967–1996), Spanish activist
- Sergio Martínez (born 1969), nicknamed "Manteca", Uruguayan former footballer

== Places ==
- Manteca, California

== Music ==
- Manteca (band), a Canadian jazz fusion band
- Manteca!, a 1965 album by Clare Fischer
- Manteca (album), a 1958 album by Red Garland
- "Manteca" (song), a 1947 jazz tune co-written by Dizzy Gillespie, Chano Pozo, and Gil Fuller
