= Javier Bello-Portu =

Javier Bello-Portu (Tolosa, 1920–2004) was a Basque composer. He was founder of the choir Escolanía Felipe Gorriti in 1943, for whom he composed the majority of his fifty choral works. Other works were composed for another choir he founded in the French Basque Country, the Basque Country Choir of Bayonne. His work was influenced by French impressionism and by the work of Father Donostia.

== Works, editions and recording ==
- Pays Basque,
- Tres canciones nostálgicas,
- Un homenaje a Iparraguirre,
- Don Miguel de Unamuno: tres sonetos
- Tres canciones alegres,
- Tríptico vasco o Tres canciones sentimentales
- O vos omnes (1937)
- Miserere (1946)
- Ave Maria (1949)
- A mi flor (1947) by Federico de Zavala (1916–1993)
- A Belén - Pastores venid! (1942) two Christmas carols
- Lastozko zubiya (1946)
- Carta del Rey (1950)
- Llanto por Martín Zalacain de Urbía (1952) for the character in Pío Baroja's novel Zalacain the Adventurer
- Soule (1953) from the song "Adios ene maitia"
- Canción de invierno (1957) poems from La fuente pensativa by Juan Ramón Jiménez
- Berceuse de Reparacea (1957) lullaby of the Palace of Reparacea in Oieregi
- Iparraguirre (1954) two songs by José Maria Iparraguirre, Nere amak baleki and Agur Euskalerriari, which had already been adapted in Un Homenaje a Iparraguirre (earlier version for mixed voices)
- Eguerria! (1955)
- No lloréis, mis ojos (1975) verses from Shepherds of Bethlehem by Lope de Vega
- In memoriam of Garat-Anthon Ayestarán (1987)
- Don Miguel de Unamuno: Tres sonetos (1996)
- Dos Fábulas de Félix María Samaniego: Las moscas, La Serpiente y la Lima (1997).
- Donostiaco damachoac (1992)
- Ostiraletan duzu (1992)
- Plainte de la jeune châtelaine (1992)

=== Recordings ===
- Complete choral works I - KEA Vocal Group, dir. Enrique Azurza. NB013 2008
- Complete choral works II - KEA Vocal Group, dir. Enrique Azurza. NB019 2009
