= Miren Karmele Azkarate Villar =

Spanish politician, professor of Basque philology

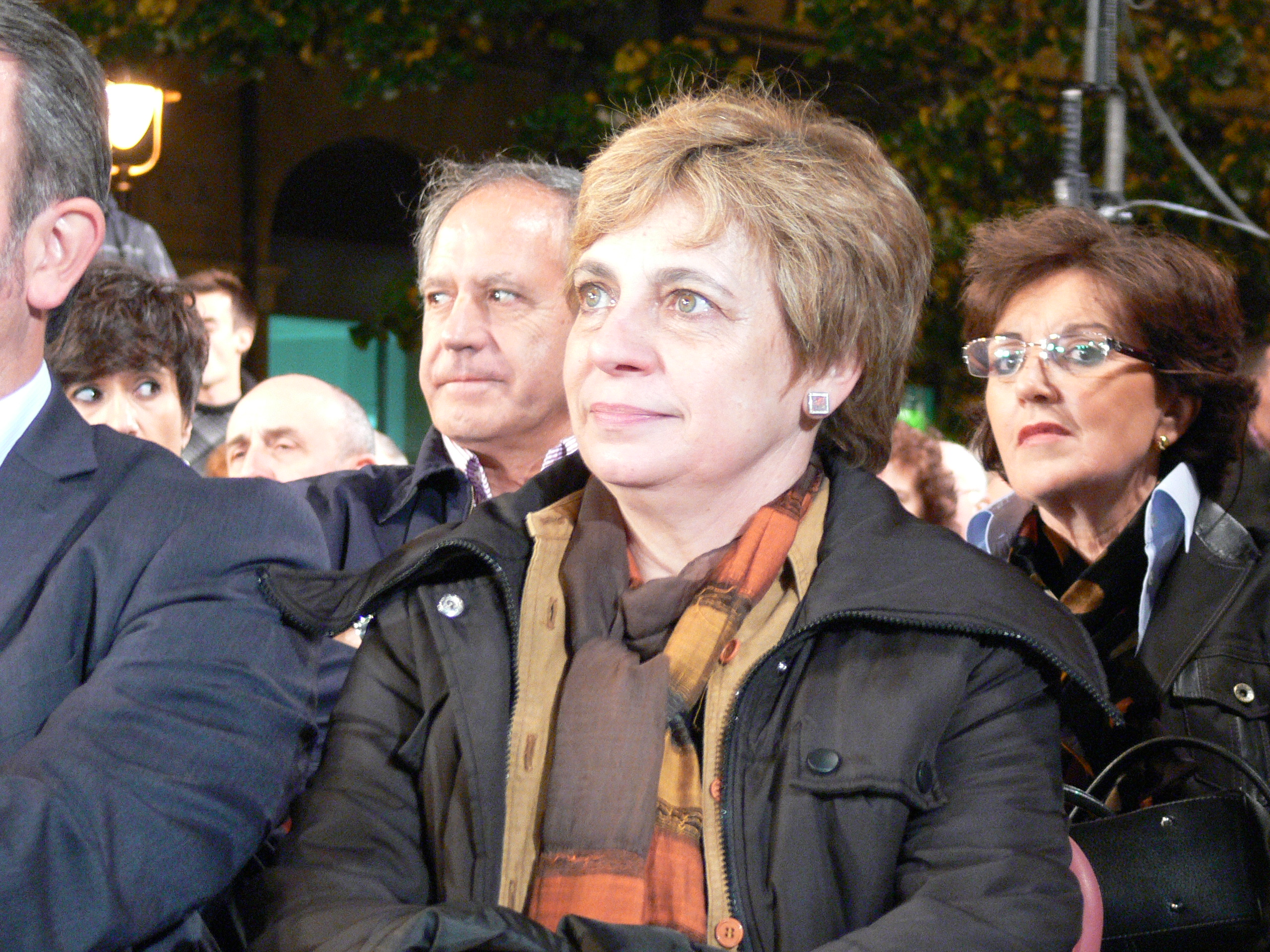

Member of the Basque Government
- In office 2001–2009

Personal details
- Born: 27 November 1955 (age 70) San Sebastián, Spain
- Citizenship: Spain
- Education: University of the Basque Country

Miren Karmele Azkarate Villar (San Sebastián, 27 November 1955) is a politician, professor of Basque philology, university lecturer and full member of the Royal Academy of the Basque Language. She was Minister of Culture and spokesperson for the Basque Government.

== Biography ==
Miren Azkarate was born in San Sebastian on 27 November 1955. She graduated in Philosophy and Arts at the University of Deusto and received her PhD in Basque Philology from the University of the Basque Country.

Between 1978 and 1988 she taught Morphosyntax and Lexicography in the Faculty of Basque Philology at the University of Deusto. Since 1988 she has been a lecturer at the University of the Basque Country and Professor of Basque Philology. Between 1996 and 1997 she was Vice-Rector of Euskera at the University of the Basque Country.

In 1983 she was appointed urgazle (corresponding member) and in 1992 she was appointed euskaltzain oso (full academic) by the Royal Academy of the Basque Language, being the first woman to be appointed full academic by the Academy (23rd chair), under the mandate of the euskaltzainburu Jean Haritschelhar; and together with Laura Mintegi and Blanca Urgell, one of the few women in the Academy.

Miren Azkarate was Minister of Culture of the Basque Government in the 7th and 8th legislatures, from 2001 to 2009, and spokesperson of the Government from 2004 to 2009, during the mandate of Juan José Ibarretxe.

Subsequently, she has been a councillor of San Sebastián, from 2011 to 2018.
