= Gorka Aulestia Txakartegi =

Spanish Basque historian and lexicographer (1932–2021)

Gorka Aulestia Txakartegi (11 December 1932 – 10 May 2021) was a Spanish Basque literary historian and lexicographer.

== Life and career ==
Gorka Aulestia Txakartegi was born in Ondarroa, Biscay, Spain, on 11 December 1932. He grew up hearing Biscayan and Gipuzkoan dialects of the Basque language, fully embracing Batua, the unified standard dialect, once it became codified. As a young man he studied philosophy and theology, hoping to be ordained as a priest. Instead, he received a degree in social economy from the University of Deusto in Bilbao. Later he migrated to the United States, where he received his M.A. in French and Spanish literature, and finally his Ph.D. in Basque Studies in 1987 at the University of Nevada, Reno, with the thesis El bertsolarismo: literatura oral improvisada en el País Vasco.

He served as the Basque language editor at the Basque Studies Program at the University of Nevada (Reno, USA) between 1976 and 1979. In the period 1980 - 1988 he acted as a lexicographer and an instructor in the Basque Studies Program, and the following year he finally became an assistant professor. From 1989 until 2000, when he retired, he taught literature in the Basque EUTG center (San Sebastián) at the University of Deusto. He is a corresponding member of the Euskaltzaindia since 1996, member of the committee on Basque literature.

Txakartegi wrote 10 books, 91 articles, and numerous other publications such as conference papers and book reviews. He wrote the following books:

- Basque-English Dictionary (edit. University of Nevada-Press, 1989)
- English-Basque Dictionary (together with Linda White, edit. University of Nevada Press, 1990)
- Basque-English, English-Basque Dictionary (together with con Linda White, edit. University of Nevada Press, 1992)
- Bertsolarismo (edit. Vizcaya Provincial Council, 1990)
- Erbesteko euskal literaturaren antologia (edit. J.A. Ascunce, 1992)
- Improvisational Poetry from the Basque Country (edit. University of Nevada Press, 1995)
- Le Pays Basque vu par les Romantiques Français (dissertation, Edit. University of Nevada Press, 1978)
- Escritores Vascos (edit. Fundación Caja Vital Kutxa, 1996);
- The Basque Poetic Tradition (edit. University of Nevada Press, 2000)
- Los Escritores. Hitos de la Literatura Clásica Euskérica (edit. Fundación Caja Vital Kutxa, 1996).

He wrote book reviews for the publications such as World Literature Today, Basque Artistic Expression (Society of Basque Studies in America) and Journal of the Dictionary Society of North America, as well as articles such as Bernard Etxepare, Medieval or Renaissance Writer? or Survey of French Basque Literature in the 20th Century.

From 2002 he was preparing a dictionary of Basque literature, a project sponsored by Euskaltzaindia, in which he had worked for ten years.

Txakartegi died on 10 May 2021, at the age of 88.

== Sources ==
- (in Spanish) AULESTIA TXAKARTEGI, Gorka, on Auñamendi Encyclopedia
- Publications at Scientific Commons
