= Luis Aranberri =

Basque journalist

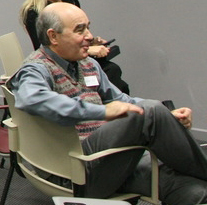
Luis Aranberri, 2010

Luis Aranberri (born 1945 in Eibar), better known as “Amatiño”, is one of the media professionals that best represents the new school of journalism in the Basque language, or Euskara, which emerged around 1970 and which, in step with the creation of the Basque Country’s own institutions, was accompanied by the development and consolidation of a Basque news arena that was practically non-existent up to barely one generation ago.

== Background and career ==
The opposition to any expression in a language other than Spanish, political censorship and the pro-government bias of the media during Franco’s dictatorship had hindered the normal development of the press in Basque.

At the same time, the absence of qualified Basque-speaking media professionals, together with the pronounced social and political commitment – almost akin to working underground – of the writers who cooperated with their opinion columns, meant that Basque language magazines tended more to reflection than general news. This was the setting for such pioneers as Javier de Aranburu, Miren Jone Azurza, Mikel Atxaga and the youngest of them all, Luis Aranberri.

Concealed behind the pen name “Amatiño”, Luis Aranberri started off as the local correspondent for the weekly Zeruko Argia in 1964, and in 1972 he created the general news section ZENBAT GARA, which immediately became the main source of news for the then incipient Basque cultural renaissance. Barely five years later, the historian and essayist Joseba Intxausti wrote:

Amatiño (a pen name that has become household name in a very short period of time) is essentially a journalist. His work is linked to Zeruko Argia, the leading Basque weekly since [1963]. He has revealed an amazingly deft touch for a self-taught writer. He uses a direct, informative style of language and is not adverse to a hint of playful irony. In this field, he is arguably the country’s foremost writer.

— Joseba Intxausti

Amatiño’s popularity spilled over into the world of Spanish when in 1976 he joined the editorial board for the Culture section in the newly founded newspaper Deia and, yet more so, when he was put in charge of the News Services of ETB, Basque public television, which began broadcasting for the first time on January 1, 1983.

== Experience ==
=== As journalist ===
- 1964–1976 – Reporter on Zeruko Argia.
- 1977–1978 – Senior journalist in the Culture section of the daily newspaper Deia.
- 1983–1984 – Head of the News Section for the Basque television network, ETB.
- 1984–1985 – Director of ETB, Basque Television.
- 1986–1988 – Editor of the weekly publication Eguna.
- 1989–1990 – Assistant Editor of the daily Deia.
- 1991–1995 – Director of ETB, Basque Television.
- Director and presenter of seven television programmes.
- Daily or weekly columnist over 40 years.

=== Experience in the civil service ===
- 1979–1980 – Head of Cultural Promotions on the General Basque Council.
- 1980–1982 – Director of Basque Language Promotions in the Basque Government.
- 1995–1998 – Director of the Basque Parliament’s Presidential Affairs Section.
- 1999-2002 – Director of the Departmental Office for Industry, Tourism and Trade.
- 2004 – Director of Communication for EAJ-PNV, the Basque Nationalist Party’s internal executive: Euzkadi Buru Batzar.

== Prizes and awards ==
- Kirikino award for Best Journalist in the Basque language. Durango, 1976.
- Bursary from the British Council, Violence on TV. University of Manchester, 1986.
- Emakunde prize. Written journalism. Bilbao, 1990.
- Essay prize Becerro de Bengoa for Intelektualak eta telebista. Gasteiz-Vitoria, 1996.
- Corresponding member of Euskaltzaindia, the Academy of the Basque Language, 2006.
