= Euskal Hiztegi Historiko-Etimologikoa =

Basque historical and etymological dictionary

- Author: Joseba Lakarra, Julen Manterola, and Iñaki Segurola
- Language: Basque
- Subject: Linguistics and lexicography
- Genre: Reference
- Publisher: Euskaltzaindia
- Publication date: 2019
- Publication place: Spain
- ISBN: 978-84-949787-7-7
- OCLC: 1229150630

The Euskal Hiztegi Historiko-Etimologikoa (EHHE; English: Basque Historical-Etymological Dictionary) is a historical and etymological dictionary of Basque, published by the Royal Academy of the Basque language, edited by Joseba Lakarra, Julen Manterola, and Iñaki Segurola. It is the first comprehensive historical and etymological Basque dictionary.

== See also ==
- History of the Basque language
- Koldo Mitxelena
