= Lourdes Oñederra =

Basque writer and professor

Miren Lourdes Oñederra
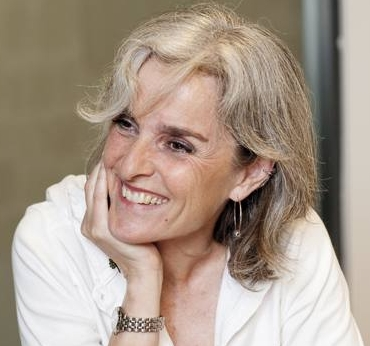
- Lourdes Oñederra in 2013
- Born: 9 June 1958 (age 68); San Sebastián

Miren Lourdes Oñederra Olaizola (born 9 June 1958) is a Basque writer and professor.

== Life ==
Oñederra was born in San Sebastián in 1958. She studied for her first degree in Spain at the University of Deusto. After graduating in 1980 she took her masters at the University of Iowa. She speaks Basque. She returned to the Basque country to take her doctorate in philology supervised by Koldo Mitxelena. She was appointed a professor in her home town in 1982.

In 1999 she published her first novel And the woman said to the serpent and this was successful and received a number of awards including the Basque Government Prize for Literature in 2000. The book has been translated into Spanish, English and Russian.

In 2014 she was a professor at the University of the Basque Country. She has made contributions towards the phonetics and phonology of Basque. In 2025 she published her third novel that translates as "At Last". The story revolves around a mother and daughter and the violence of the mother's brother-in-law.
