= Vicenta Moguel =

Spanish writer and translator

Vicenta Moguel, Bizenta Mogel
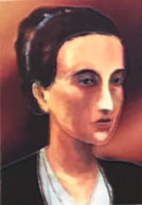
- Born: 1782; Azcoitia, Spain
- Died: 1854 (aged 71–72); Abanto, Spain
- Other name: Bizenta Mogel Elgezabal
- Occupations: Writer and Translator

Vicenta Antonia Moguel Elguezábal (Azcoitia, 1782 - Abanto, 1854) was a Spanish writer and translator who was the first woman to write in the Basque language. In Basque Country, she is known by the local spelling of her name, Bizenta Mogel Elgezabal.

== Early life and education ==
Moguel was born in 1782 in Azkoitia, in a part of Northern Spain known as the Basque Country. She was very young when her father died and moved with her brother Juan José to live in Markina with her uncle, the priest and writer Juan Antonio Moguel (1745 - 1804). He was a scholar and author of the first novel in the Basque language, Peru Abarca (1802), and he was a friend of Felix Maria de Samaniego (1745–1801), a Spanish writer famous for his fables.

She received her educational training from her uncle, who taught her Latin, Basque and Spanish and encouraged her interest in literature and fables. Her brother also became an accomplished writer.

== Career ==
Moguel became a professor in the Society of Friends of the Country and is widely credited with being the first woman to write in the Basque language at a time when most women were not literate and she was "forced to give explanations about her status as a literate woman and writer."

Vicenta's first and best-known work is Ipui onac (The Good Stories,1804), written when she was 22 years old. Ipui onac is her prose translation of Aesop's fables, 50 credited directly to Aesop and eight other fables in verse from her uncle Juan Antonio, which she added to the end of the book.

Another text, titled Adigarria, precedes her uncle's fables, and the book ends with a lexicon divided into two sections, one for Vicenta's fables, and the other for those of her uncle. With the publication the work was well received and reprinted several times.

She wrote Gabonetaco cantia Bizkaitar guztientzat (Christmas Song for all Biscay, 1819) and a song collected in Mahn's anthology. In 1820 she translated the Pastoral Letter of the Primate of Spain into Basque, which was published in Bilbao. She was also a known collaborator in the correction of the texts of Jose Pablo Ulibarri.

In addition to her published fables, she also authored other texts, such as the dedication to Don Victor Munibe and Aranguren and the prologue to the Basque reader. Some of her fables were collected in the Cancionero (1880) of Manterola, as well as in several periodicals of the time.

The resurgence of the fables genre coincided with a decline in the influence of traditional stories from the Catholic Church. In general, fables with a moral point of view became considered the most appropriate reading material for children. Moguel mentions the need for morality in her prologue in Basque, stating that:

"When I was a child I listened to the folk tales marveling and crazy with joy. And I believed the ridiculous and insubstantial tales of Peru and Maria as if they were great truths. So, if those stupid tales without any teaching gave me such satisfaction before reaching the age of reason, how much more would my heart be softened when I later read the good stories?"

== Personal life ==
Moguel married Eugenio Basozabal. She died in Abando, Spain in 1854 at age 72.

== Awards and honors ==
The Bizenta Mogel Elgazabal Municipal Library in the Basque Country, Durango, Spain, was named for Moguel on March 8, 2017. The move was undertaken by the Durango City Council and was unanimously approved in February 2015 after a motion was promoted by the Equality Council to "make women more visible in the city's public spaces." Although Moguel had not lived in that community, she was honored there as the first woman to write and publish in the Basque language.
