= Federico Krutwig =

Basque writer (1921–1998)

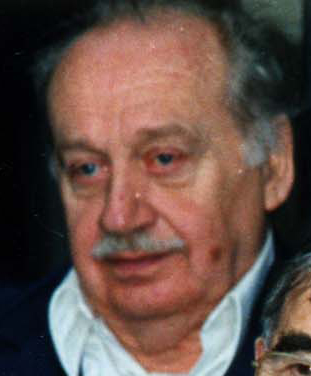
- Born: Federico Krutwig Sagredo; May 15, 1921; Getxo, Spain
- Died: 1998 (aged 76–77); Bilbao, Spain
- Occupations: Writer, philosopher and politician
- Writing career
- Language: Basque, Spanish
- Notable work: Vasconia
- Literary movement: Anarcho-independentism

Federico Krutwig Sagredo (Getxo, 15 May 1921 – Bilbao, 15 November 1998) was a Spanish Basque writer, philosopher, politician, and author of several books, with Vasconia standing out in the political domain for its influence in the early stages of ETA, and as an advocate of classic Labourdin for the standardization of Basque. He distanced himself from Sabino Arana's brand of Basque nationalism, emphasizing language instead of race as pivotal for the Basque nation.

Along with Felix Likiniano, he tried to create some resistance to Franco's dictatorial regime after the Spanish Civil War. The thought of both authors, melding Basque nationalism and anarchism gave birth to a minor political current known as Anarkoabertzalism (Anarcho-independentism), which eventually merged within the hybrid of Marxism and Anarchism known as Autonomism.

== Biography ==
Federico Krutwig was born on 15 May 1921 in Getxo, the son of a bourgeois family of German origin. He taught himself the Basque language. He joined the Basque-Language Academy in 1943, where he favoured the standardisation of Basque around the Labourdine dialect of the first printed books in Basque, and with an etymological orthography. However, the academy preferred the Guipuscoan dialect as the basis of Standard Basque. Krutwig's Basque language standardisation proposal was not to be applied beyond the members of the Jakintza Baitha ("House of Knowledge") Hellenophile society.

In 1952, after rejecting Luis Villasante joining the Basque-Language Academy, and after his criticisms of the position of the Catholic Church in reference to the Basque language, he went into exile in France. Once in Donibane-Lohizune he contacted members of the movement Jagi-Jagi. In 1963 he edited the book Vasconia, in which he questioned part of the traditional Basque nationalism of Sabino Arana and proposed a new Basque nationalism.

Krutwig collaborated with ex-militants of EGI and theorized about the use of violence for political purposes. In 1964 he was expelled from France and moved to Brussels, Belgium. Here he made contact with members of ETA. He elaborated some memoranda for ETA's V at Guethary, and put ETA in contact with the Czech weapon industry. In 1975 he abandoned ETA and established his residency back in Spain in Zarauz, to dedicate himself exclusively to literary production.

His main writings are:

- Vasconia (1963): Published initially under the pseudonym of Fernando Sarrailh de Ihartza, in which Krutwig describes an ideal Greater Basqueland comprising all the supposedly historical territories, from the Garonne to the Ebro rivers.
- La Nueva Europa (The New Europe, 1976): In this essay Krutwig extends his ideas on Greater Vasconia to Western Europe, claiming and hoping for an "internal decolonization" of the continent and proposing what could be grossly taken as the Europe of the Regions.
- Garaldea: Sobre el origen de los vascos y su relación con los guanches (Garaldea: On the origin of Basques and their relation to Guanches, 1978): In this, maybe his most scientific and serious essay, Krutwig studies the origins of the Basques and explores a hypothetical Garaldea (land of "we are" or land of the flame), extending at some time in the past through all Western Europe and the Mediterranean basin. In the annexes, he analyzes transcriptions of Guanche (native Canarian) and Pictish inscriptions, concluding that their two extinct languages are not just related to Basque but that they are the very same tongue. This daring claim has not been corroborated by anyone so far, and nearly all specialists in the subject consider it erroneous.
- La Nueva Vasconia (The New Vasconia, 1979): a substantially enlarged re-edition of Vasconia, after the death of Franco.
- Computer Shock Vasconia Año 2001 (1984)

He spoke and read several ancient and modern languages. He translated works of Goethe and Mao Zedong into Basque. Krutwig died in Bilbao in 1998.

== Influence ==
The Basque folk group Oskorri released an album Garaldea featuring collaborations with Canarian musicians.

While staying in Aosta Valley in the 1970s, he came into contact with Josèf Henriet, who was inspired by his ideology to create the first Arpitan movement, which Josèf (or Joseph/Giuseppe) called "Harpitan" spoken in the idealised country of "Harpitanya".

== Sources ==
- Sudupe, Pako 2011: 50eko hamarkadako euskal literatura I. Hizkuntza eta ideologia eztabaidak, Donostia, Utriusque Vasconiae. ISBN 978-84-938329-4-0
- Sudupe, Pako 2011: 50eko hamarkadako euskal literatura II. Kazetaritza eta saiakera, Donostia, Utriusque Vasconiae. ISBN 978-84-938329-5-7
- Sudupe, Pako 2012: "Ideologia eztabaidak 50eko hamarkadan" in Alaitz Aizpuru (koord.), Euskal Herriko pentsamenduaren gida, Bilbo, UEU. ISBN 978-84-8438-435-9
