= Elbira Zipitria =

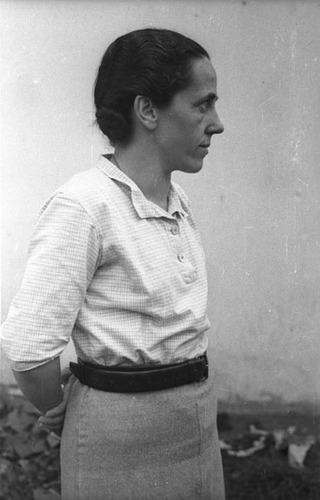
Elbira Zpitria (1939)

Elbira Zipitria Irastorza (1906–1982) was an innovative Basque educator who pioneered home schools as a means of reviving use of the Basque language at a time when it was prohibited. On returning to San Sebastián after the Spanish Civil War she taught young children in their own homes before creating the first ikastola or home Basque-language school in 1956. In the 1960s, 71 schools were created in the towns and cities of the Southern Basque Country although they were still illegal. It was not until 1970 that official permission was granted for the opening of the Orixe Ikastola in San Sebastián. Zipitria was a member of various political and cultural organizations, including Emakume Abertzale Batza, Euskaltzaleak and Eusko Ikaskuntza.

== Biography ==
Born in Zumaia on 28 May 1906, she was brought up in San Sebastián. When she was 16, she began a four-year course of teacher-training studies, graduating in 1926. Her first job was at San Sebastián's Koruko Andre Mariaren Ikastetxea school where she taught six-year-olds. In addition to teaching, she took an interest in political and cultural affairs, joining the women's branch of the Basque Nationalist Party where she became secretary in 1934, the Euskaltzaleak Basque Action Organization and Eusko Ikaskuntza, the Basque Studies Society.

During the Spanish Civil War she moved to the French Basque Country where she lived in Ascain, Ciboure, Sare and Saint-Jean-de-Luz, returning to San Sebastián in 1939. In 1943, as the only language permitted in Spanish schools was Castilian Spanish, she started to give lessons in Basque in private homes, creating a class of small children in her own home in 1946.

She went on to create more of these throughout the Basque provinces. The classrooms were set in the kitchen where the children were seated around the table like a family. The method proved so successful that it was later used to teach adults. Colleagues including Xabier Peña, María Ángeles Garai, Juliana Berrojalbiz and Tere Rotaetze participated in creating home schools and teaching in them. The demand was so great that the authorities were unable to stop the expansion. To save face, they arranged for most of the ikastola schools to be legally recognized as church schools. Between 1960 and 1970, 71 new schools were created, mainly in bilingual towns and cities. In 1970, the Orixe Ikastola School in San Sebastián was the first to be officially receive permission to open. Although they do not receive subsidies, today the ikastola schools are considered part of the public school system in the Spanish Basque Country.

Elbira Zipitria retired from the Orixe School in 1971 when she was 75. After suffering depressions for a number of years, apparently as a result of the problems she had experienced as a supporter of the Basque language, she died in San Sebastián on 26 December 1982.
