= Maite Idirin =

Basque singer

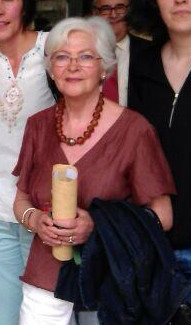
- Idirin in 2014
- Born: Maite Idirin Solatxi; July 12, 1943; Ugao-Miraballes, Spain
- Died: January 20, 2024 (aged 80); Anglet, France
- Education: Euskaltzaindia
- Occupation: singer
- Spouse: Jokin Apalategi

Maite Idirin Solatxi (July 12, 1943 – January 20, 2024) was a Spanish singer of Basque origin.

== Biography ==
Maite Idirin was a pioneer of the musical renewal of Basque songs in the 1960s and 1970s. She was a founder of the Zabal bookstore in Baiona. She published a book in Basque on Basque nationalism.

In 2014 the Academy of the Basque Language awarded her as an honorary academic.

== Discography ==
- 1968, Atahualpa Yupanqui en euskera.
- 1970, Solatxi
- 1972, Detchepare 1545
- 1973, Sudor frío, sangre caliente.
- 1975, Desde que nace la semilla, puesta en la tierra.
- 1979, Hermandad
- 1992, En sueños
- 2012, Villancicos
- 2013, Maite Idirin en concierto

== Awards ==
- 2011, Honorary Basque Studies Award, city of Bayonne.
- 1979, gold medal for singing in Bayonne.
- 1981, gold medal for singing in Bordeaux.
