= Juan Antonio Mogel =

Basque writer (1745–1804)

Joan Antonio Mogel Urkiza (in Spanish, Juan Antonio Moguel Urquiza) (1745–1804) was a Basque writer of the 18th century and author of one of the most important pieces of Basque classical literature, Peru Abarka, the first novel written in that language. Finished by the author in 1782, this book was not published until 1880 — in installments that came out in a newspaper. In 1881, it was published as a book for the first time.

Mogel was the uncle and teacher of translator and writer Vicenta Moguel (also known by her Basque name Bizenta Mogel) who was the first woman to write in the Basque language. She and her brother Juan José went to live with Mogel in Markina, Spain where he taught them Latin, Basque and Spanish and encouraged their interest in literature.
