= Mikel Zalbide =

Basque linguist and sociolinguist

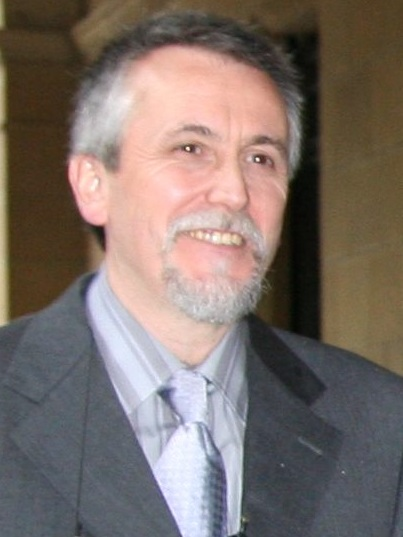
- Born: 9 May 1951 (age 75); San Sebastián
- Known for: Basque linguistics

Academic background
- Education: University of Navarra

Academic work
- Discipline: linguistics

Mikel Zalbide Elustondo (born 9 May 1951) is a Basque linguist and sociolinguist.

== Life ==
Zalbide was born in San Sebastián and studied engineering at the University of Navarra. From a young age, he worked in those areas where Basque needed to be developed.

== Terminology and lexicography ==
He has done extensive work in the planning of the corpus of Euskera. In 1972, while still a student, he was one of the founders of Elhuyar Kultur Elkartea. In addition to creating the first technical-scientific journal in Euskera, he took part in the preparation of didactic material and launched studies on word formation.

Since the creation of UZEI (Unibertsitate Zerbitzuetarako Euskal Institutua) in 1978, he has been technically responsible for the area of science and technology. He worked at UZEI, among other things, in the dictionaries of Physics, Chemistry, and Mathematics. He also studied the formation of lexicon and taught courses on the subject.He is also the author of the systematization work carried out in UZEI around the writing and pronunciation of lexical loans.

== Education ==
In 1979, Zalbide was one of the participants in the initiative to create a Basque University, a joint commission called Commission For the Planning of Basque University. He was a member of the Joint Commission created by the pre-autonomous entity Basque General Council and the University of Bilbao (later the University of the Basque Country). Within it was created a subcommittee on linguistic standardization, the working group Zalbide was responsible for.

Since 1981, he has worked in the Department of Education, Universities and Research of the Basque Government as head of the Euskera Service. He retired in 2014. As head of the Basque Department of the Department of Education, he has taken part in the main projects developed by the Administration to fix the teaching of Euskera and the levels of knowledge of that language.

In the fields of pedagogy and education he has participated in the working groups for the implementation of various projects: the EIMA (Euskal Ikasmaterialgintza) program for the creation of didactic materials in Euskera (both textbooks for Primary Education and Secondary, as audiovisual material and software), and to ensure the quality of the language; the NOLEGA program and the ULIBARRI project, with the aim of reinforcing the use of Euskera in the school environment; and the Plan for Euskaldunizar, and the Educational Administration. It has also been committed to analyze the linguistic competencies of Models A, B, and D, draw conclusions and propose improvement measures.

== Royal Academy of the Basque Language ==
He was appointed a member of the Royal Academy of the Basque Language - Euskaltzaindia in 1983. Before that, in 1976, he was a member of the institution's subcommittee on mathematics. In the academy he has done important work in the fields of lexicology and lexicography: he has been a member of the Lexicography Commission and the Jargon Section. In both cases he has held the position of secretary for some years.

On the other hand, within the same Euskaltzaindia, he has been responsible for management of the Commission for the Establishment of Lexical Criteria (LEF in its acronym in Euskera). Around this line of work the projects of fixation of the writing of the lexical loans, the Basque General Dictionary and the EEBS project (Egungo Euskararen Bilketa Sistematikoa) were developed.

Since April 27, 2006, he is an academic in number. He read his address to San Sebastian on June 2, 2007.

He is currently working on the Joanes Etxeberri project (Euskararen Historia Soziala - EHS Euskera Social History). This project, created in 2007, is developed in the field of historical sociolinguistics, analyzing the social evolution of Euskera and languages that have been in contact with Basque through time.

== Works ==
=== Books ===
- Maileguzko hitzak: idazkera eta ebakera, Donostia: UZEI, 1981
- Hitz-elkarketa 1. LEF batzordearen lanak, Bilbo: Euskaltzaindia, 1987
- Euskal Irakaskuntza: 10 urte. Gasteiz: Eusko Jaurlaritzaren Argitalpen Zerbitzu Nagusia, 1990
- Hitz elkartuen osaera eta idazkera: LEF batzordearen emaitzak, Euskaltzaindiaren gomendio-arauak. Bilbo: Euskaltzaindia, 1992

=== Articles ===
- Mende hasierako euskalgintza: urratsak eta hutsuneak in II. Euskal Mundu Biltzarra. Euskara-biltzarra, Gasteiz: Eusko Jaurlaritzaren Argitalpen Zerbitzu Nagusia, 1988
- Euskal Eskola, Asmo Zahar Bide Berri in Euskal Eskola Publikoaren Lehen Kongresua, Gasteiz: Eusko Jaurlaritzaren Argitalpen Zerbitzu Nagusia, 1, 211–271, 1990
- Eskola-giroko hizkuntza-erabileran eragiten duten faktoreen lehen azalpen-saioa in Eskola Hiztun Bila, 17–35. Gasteiz: Eusko Jaurlaritzaren Argitalpen Zerbitzu Nagusia, 1991
- Educational situation of the Basque Autonomous Community in Spain, Estrasburgo: Europako Kontseilua, 1993
- Zientzi hizkuntza irakaskuntzan: euskara teknikoaren izaeraz, iturburuaz eta egungo erabilmoduaz, Gasteiz: Eusko Ikaskuntza, 1993
- Eskola-munduan erabiltzen den euskara: egungo egoera eta zenbait hobekuntza-bide in Euskera, 1994
- Hitz elkartuen osaera eta idazkera : gomendio-arauak prestatzeko erabili diren irizpideak in Euskaltzaindiaren XIII. Biltzarra, Euskera, 1994
- Maileguzko hitzen zenbait muga-arazo in Euskaltzaindiaren XIII. Biltzarra, Euskera, 1994
- Zientzi hizkuntza irakaskuntzan: euskara teknikoaren izaeraz, iturburuaz eta egungo erabilmoduaz in Euskal ikaskuntzak hezkuntza sarean, Eusko Ikaskuntza, 281-290 1995
- Normalización lingüística y escolaridad: un informe desde la sala de máquinas in Eusko Ikaskuntzen Nazioarteko Aldizkaria 43, 2, 355–424, 1998
- Irakas-sistemaren hizkuntz normalkuntza: nondik norakoaren ebaluazio-saio bat in Eleria 5, 45–61, 2000
- Ahuldutako hizkuntza indarberritzea: teoriak zer dio? in Ikastolen IX. Jardunaldi Pedagogikoak, Donostia:EHIK, 2002
- Ikasleek egiten al dute euskaraz? in Bat: Soziolinguistika aldizkaria 42, 43-52 2002
- Hendaia-Hondarribietako biltzarra: azalpen labur bat" in Hermes: pentsamendu eta historia aldizkaria, 4. zkia., 2002, 68-78
- Hendai-Hondarribietako biltzarrak, XX. mendeko hizkuntz plangintzaren iturburu in Euskaltzaleen Biltzarraren mendeurrena, Bilbo: Sabino Arana Kultur Elkargoa, 2003
- Hezkuntzaren kalitatea, elebitasunaren argitan in Ikastetxea, kalitatearen gune, 196–212, Gasteiz: Eusko Jaurlaritzaren Argitalpen Zerbitzu Nagusia, 2004
- Hizkuntza-normalkuntzaren oinarrizko kontzeptuak, perspektiba sozioedukatiboan in Ulibarri proiektuaren prestakuntza-jardunaldia, Gasteiz, 2004
- Basque Acquisition planning, Nicholas Gardner eta Mikel Zalbide, in International Journal of theSociology of Language 174, 55-72 or. 2005
- A Basque perspective on the future of lesser used languages in CAER (Education Society of the European Regions), Cardiff, 2005
- Lardizabalen gramatika, bere gizarte-giroan in Euskera 51. 1., 71-103 2006
- Lardizabal eta bere gramatika, perspektiba soziolinguistikoan, Arantzazu Muñoa-rekin batera, in Francisco Ignacio Lardizabalen 1856ko Gramática Vascongada-ren 2006ko edizioa: Gipuzkoako Foru Aldundia, 2006
- Hizkuntzen azterbideak, Iturriagaren argitan in Bat: Soziolinguistika aldizkaria 65, 111–125, 2007
- Iparraldeko euskalgintza XIX. mendearen bigarren erdian: Zaldubi eta bere garaia in Euskera 52, 3., 877-1008 2007
- Euskararen Legeak hogeita bost urte eskola alorreko bilakaera: balioespen-saioa in Euskera 52. 3., 1283–1517, 2007
- "Sprachpolitik und gesellschaftliche alphabetisierung" jakin-iturri eta bide-erakusle in Euskera, 52. 2., 789–811, 2007
- Pedagogoa batzar nagusietan. Hizkuntzen azterbideak, Iturriagaren argitan: Euskaltzaindiko sarrera-hitzaldia in Euskera 52. 1., 61-157 2007
- Interferentzia, hiztun garbien galera eta mintzaldaketa: Hiriart-Urrutiren garaiko zenbait korrelato in ASJU XLIII, 1003–1034, 2009
- Hizkuntza-soziologiaren ibilia gurean in Bat: Soziolinguistika aldizkaria 77, 27–55, 2010
- Diglosiaren purgatorioaz. Teoriatik tiraka in Bat: Soziolinguistika aldizkaria 79–80, 13–152, 2011
- Hamar ondorio, gazi eta gozo in Bat: Soziolinguistika aldizkaria 79–80, 225–254, 2011
