= Balendin Enbeita =

Basque writer (1906–1986)

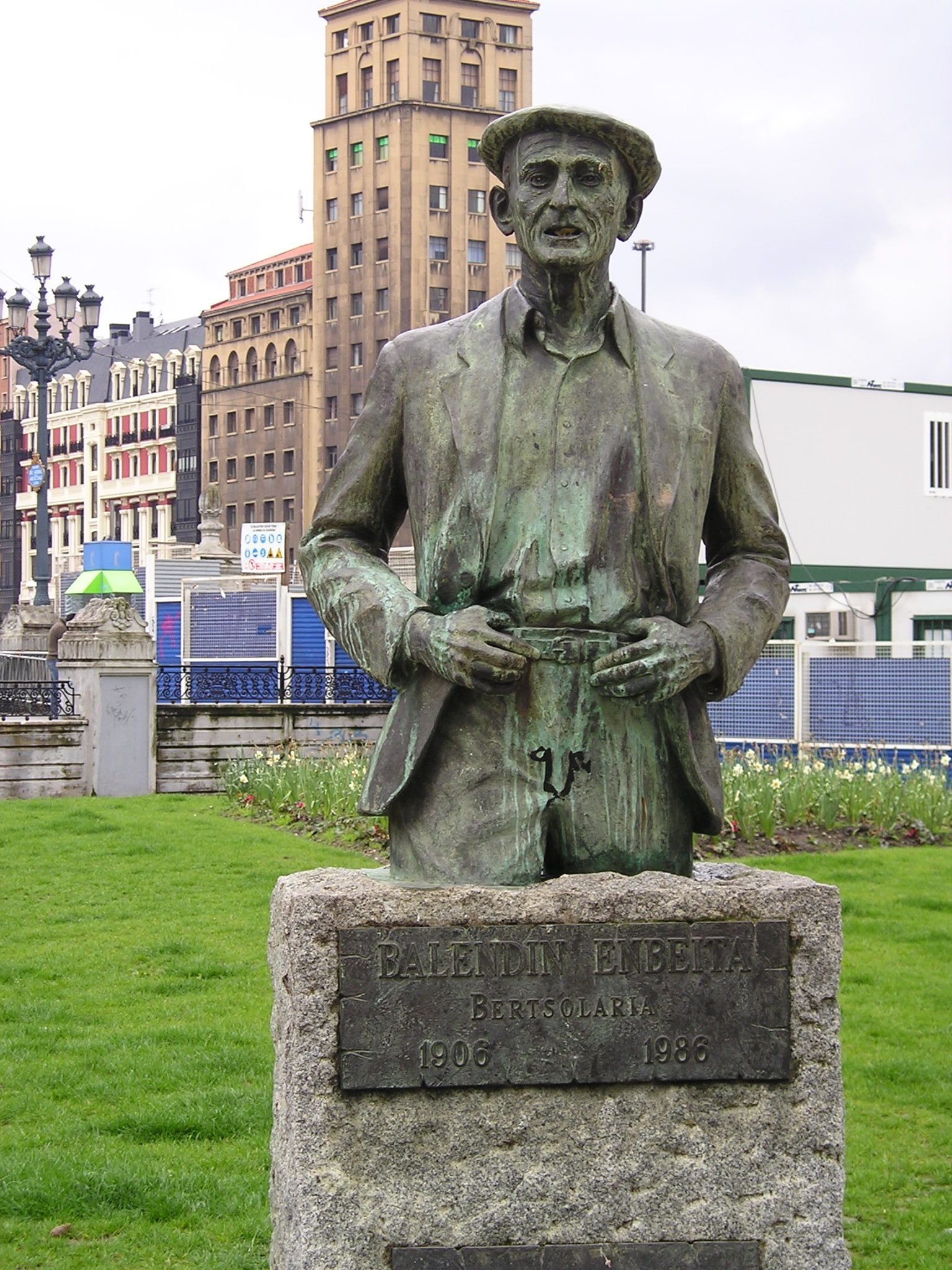
- Statue in honor of Enbeita
- Born: Balendin Enbeita; May 20, 1906
- Died: November 20, 1986 (aged 77)
- Occupation: Poet

Balendin Enbeita (May 20, 1906 – November 20, 1986) was a Basque Bertsolaritza (improvised sung poetry verse singer) and writer. His father was Kepa Enbeita Urretxindorra, his grandfather Juan Antonio Enbeita alias Txotxojeuri.

In the Spanish Civil War, where he fought for the Basque Government, he was wounded and later sentenced to twelve years imprisonment, of which he served four years.

In 1958 he founded in Ariatza the first Bertsolari school that produced many successful Bertsolaris, including his own son as well as Jon Lopategi, Jon Mugartegi, Deunoro Sardui, Ireneo Ajuria. He is considered the greatest promoter of Bertsolari in Bizkaia.
