= Resurrección María de Azkue =

Basque priest, writer and musician (1864–1951)

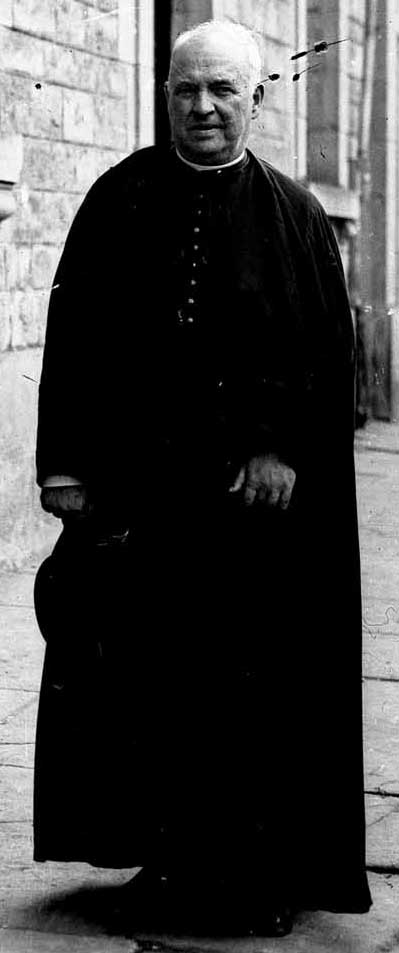
- Born: 5 August 1864; Lekeitio, Biscay, Spain
- Died: 9 November 1951 (aged 87); Bilbao, Biscay, Spain
- Occupation: Writer
- Writing career
- Notable works: Diccionario Vasco-Español-Francés; Euskal Izkindea-Gramática Euskara morfología Vasca

Resurrección María de Azkue (5 August 1864 – 9 November 1951) was an influential Spanish priest, musician, poet, writer, sailor and academic. He made several major contributions to the study of the Basque language and was the first head of the Euskaltzaindia, the Academy of the Basque Language. In spite of some justifiable criticism of an imbalance towards unusual and archaic forms and a tendency to ignore the Romance influence on Basque, he is considered one of the greatest scholars of Basque to date.

His full name is Resurrección de Jesús María de las Nieves Azkue Aberásturi, but he is commonly known as Resurrección María de Azkue, R. M. Azkue, or simply Azkue.

== Biography ==
Azkue was born in the Biscayan town of Lekeitio, was a native speaker of Basque and the son of Basque poet Eusebio María de los Dolores Azkue Barrundia who was from Lekeitio himself and María del Carmen Aberásturi.

After taking nautical studies in Lekeitio, he went on to Bilbao to do his baccalaureate and then Vitoria and University of Salamanca to study theology and philosophy. He gained priesthood in 1888. That same year, the Foral Government of Biscay invited new applicants for the chair of Basque Studies. Azkue, Sabino Arana and Miguel de Unamuno all applied but Azkue was awarded the position. He initiated many initiatives related to orthographic issues and the teaching of Basque, including the two magazines Euskalzale and Ibaizabal.

Although he considered himself a Basque patriot (or abertzale) and although he was in contact with nationalist figures such as Sabino Arana and Ramón de la Sota, he is not considered to have been a Carlist and frequently disagreed with Arana and de Soto, particularly on Basque linguistic issues. More enamoured with the Basque language and culture, he tried to avoid politics in favour of cultural activities.

Notwithstanding, for many years there were two main camps of Basque writers and supporters of Basque culture – those that leaned towards Azkue's approach (the so-called Azkuezaleak) and those that leaned towards Arana's approach (the so-called Aranazaleak). Over time, the popularity of Arana's somewhat puristic approach eventually waned.

In 1904, Azkue left Bilbao to travel Europe for 5 years, with major stops in Tours, Brussels and Cologne, where he completed his musical studies. On returning to Bilbao in 1909 he further busied himself with academic work (such as Ortzuri in 1911 and Urlo in 1914), boosting the emergence of the academic study of Basque. He was one of the most important supporters of establishing the Euskaltzaindia, the Academy of the Basque Language, at the 1918 congress of Eusko Ikaskuntza in Oñati and was its first head from its birth in 1919 onwards.

He vacated his chair of Basque studies in 1920 to immerse himself fully with the work of the Euskaltzaindia, pushing initiatives to codify and promote the Basque language, against considerable opposition from official quarters and the Arana camp. His main study on Basque morphology, 'Morfología Vasca' and the collection of Basque folks songs, Cancionero Popular Vasco, fall into this period. He also developed the famous Erizkizundi Irukoitza ('Triple Questionnaire'), a substantial tool to elicit information on vocabulary, morphology and pronunciation of Basque from informants.

1935 saw the publication of Euskaleŕiaren Yakintza, a 4 volume collection of traditional lore and a major push to develop the Gipuzkera Osatua project.

During the Spanish Civil War, Francisco Franco ordered the closure of the Euskaltzaindia but Azkue managed to avoid exile as he was both of an advanced age and not a prominent political figure. Eventually, he managed to re-open the Euskaltzaindia in 1941 with the help of the young Federico Krutwig. Azkue eventually died in 1951 shortly after accidentally falling into the Ibaizabal river in Bilbao.

== Studies ==
Azkue spent most of his life studying the Basque language and his works continue to be a major source of information to anyone working with the Basque language. Most of his work focussed on lexicography, grammar and popular literature. Some of his most important works include:

- Euskal Izkindea-Gramática Euskara (1891). A study on the Basque verb which Azkue in later years called a "sin of his youth" as it sought to present an idealised and "purified" picture of the Basque language. Although Azkue himself left this approach behind soon, Euskal Izkindea inspired a school of thought that for many years sought to promote such an idealised view of the Basque language.
- Diccionario Vasco-Español-Francés ("Basque-Spanish-French dictionary") (1905). Originally published in two parts, this is the publication that Azkue is most widely known for today. It lists Basque words from all Basque dialects in unmodified form and is considered a major source of dialectal material. Azkue collected the data for this dictionary from existing sources and his own research. It has been reprinted numerous times.
- Diccionario de Bolsillo Vasco-Español y Español-Vasco (1918), a Spanish-Basque pocket dictionary.
- Cancionero Popular Vasco (1918–1921), a compilation of music and songs.
- Morfología Vasca (1923), a study on Basque suffixes. This publication too still constitutes a major source of information on morphological data, including forms and features that are no longer in use.
- Euskaleŕiaren Yakintza ("the knowledge of the Basque Country") (1935–1947), a major collection of traditional basque lore.
- Gipuzkera osotua (1935), Azkue's documentation on a standardised form of Gipuzkoan.

Between them, Euskaleŕiaren Yakintza and Cancionero constitute a major collection of Basque folklore, containing songs, poems, soties, children's games, tonguetwisters, customs, beliefs, folk remedies and over 2900 proverbs. He also revised Lucien Bonaparte's original distinction of eight dialects into seven.

== Contribution to Batua ==
In relation to the efforts to find a literary standard for the Basque language, Azkue was a proponent of Gipuzkera Osotua ('Completed Gipuzkoan'). This was in essence a codified form of the Gipuzkoan dialect as the balance of power had by then shifted from the Northern Basque dialects to the South, with the majority of Basque speakers now concentrated in Biscay and Gipuzkoa.

His novels, such as Ardi Galdua ('the lost sheep'), were written in Gipuzkera Osotua and it was to be a major influence on the later development of Standard Basque.
