= José Manterola =

Basque writer

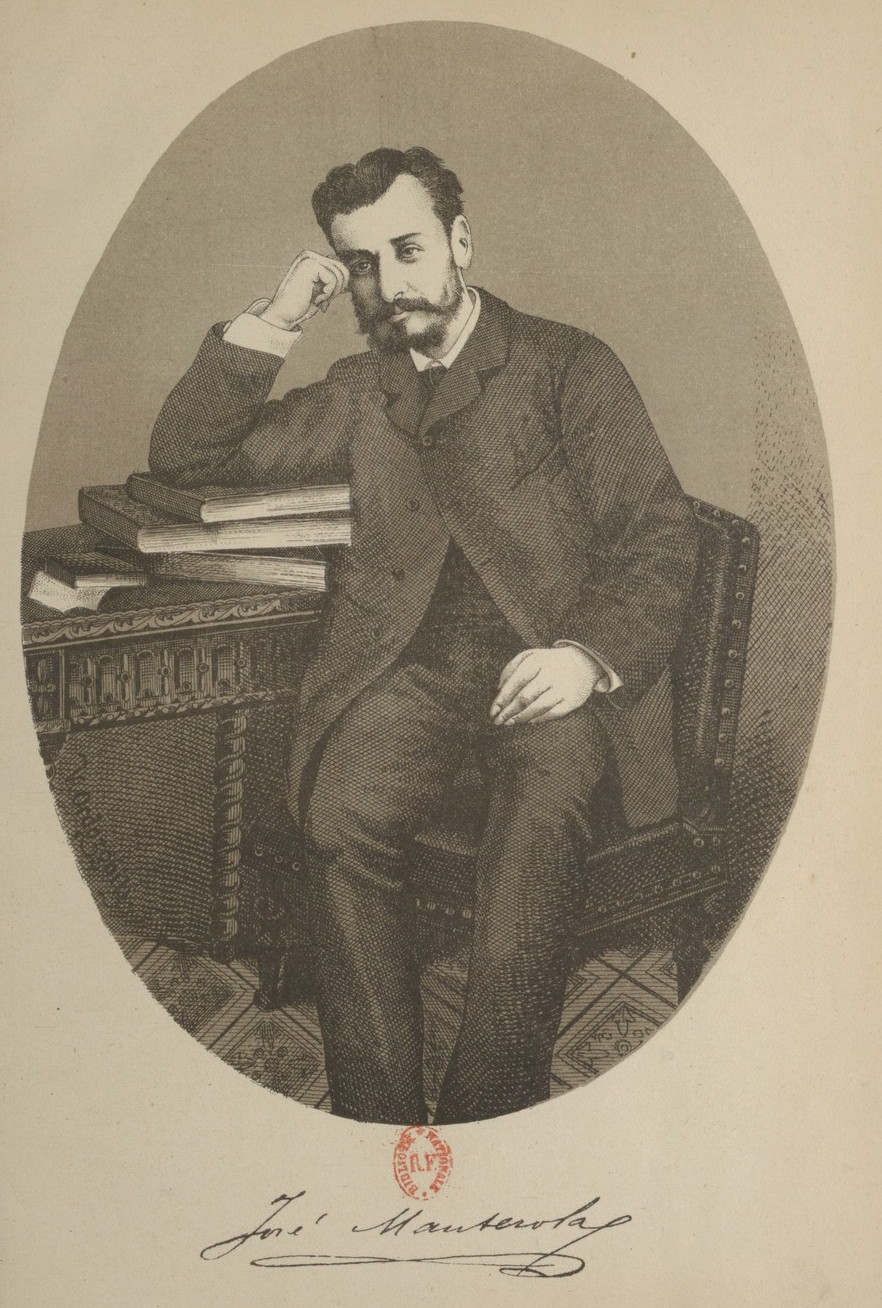
José Manterola

Don José Manterola Beldarrain (1849–1884), born in San Sebastián, Gipuzkoa, Spain, was a Basque writer who founded one of the most influential movements for cultivating the Basque language. As a member of the Navarrese movement, he was best known for founding the bilingual magazine Euskal-Erria (meaning the country of the Basques) in 1880, and editing it until 1884. Between 1877 and 1880 he published a three volume collection of Basque songs, Cancionero Vasco, complete with biographical, bibliographical, and critical notes. They are generally regarded as being the first anthology of Basque poetry.
