= Jon Manteca =

Media icon in 1980s Spain

Jon Manteca Cabañes, better known as Cojo Manteca (Manteca, the cripple) (Mondragón, Guipúzcoa, 1967 - Orihuela, Alicante, May 25, 1996), was a person elevated to media icon in the late 1980s in Spain after the publication of photographs and videos that showed him smashing street furniture in a student demonstration in January 1987.

== Biography ==
He was born in Mondragón (Guipúzcoa) in 1967. On January 26, 1983, when he was 16, an electric shock caused him to fall from a pylon which he had climbed. Because of the wounds caused by the electricity and fall, he lost a leg and suffered severe head injuries, including a great scar across his head from side to side.

Punk and homeless, on January 23, 1987, he was a newcomer to Madrid. He was begging when he casually wandered onto one of the many student demonstrations that roamed the city at the time. This time the scene was at the intersection of Alcalá Street and Gran Vía, in front of the Ministry of Education, and the demonstration was unusually violent. The police arrived and started to shoot, hitting a demonstrator, Maria Luisa Prada, who was 15 years old. Cojo Manteca, infected by the violent environment, as he explained later, used the one crutch he used to walk to break a Metro signboard station and a thermometer-clock near the Bank of Spain, and that attitude was captured by the cameras of EFE press. The photograph ran on the front pages of national and foreign newspapers due to the colorful character (punk aesthetic, mutilation, scarring, violence), and soon ended up being converted by the media as a symbol of the student demonstrations, despite him not being a student nor having any relationship with the protest, other than being there by chance. He was identified days later in Seville and spent a brief period in prison.

On March 12, 1987, he was arrested charged on public scandal in Valencia for insulting Our Lady of the Forsaken in her basilica. He spent 120 days in prison.

He died on 25 May 1996 due to AIDS
