= Maite Arruabarrena =

Spanish-Basque opera singer (born 1964)

Maite Arruabarrena Unanue
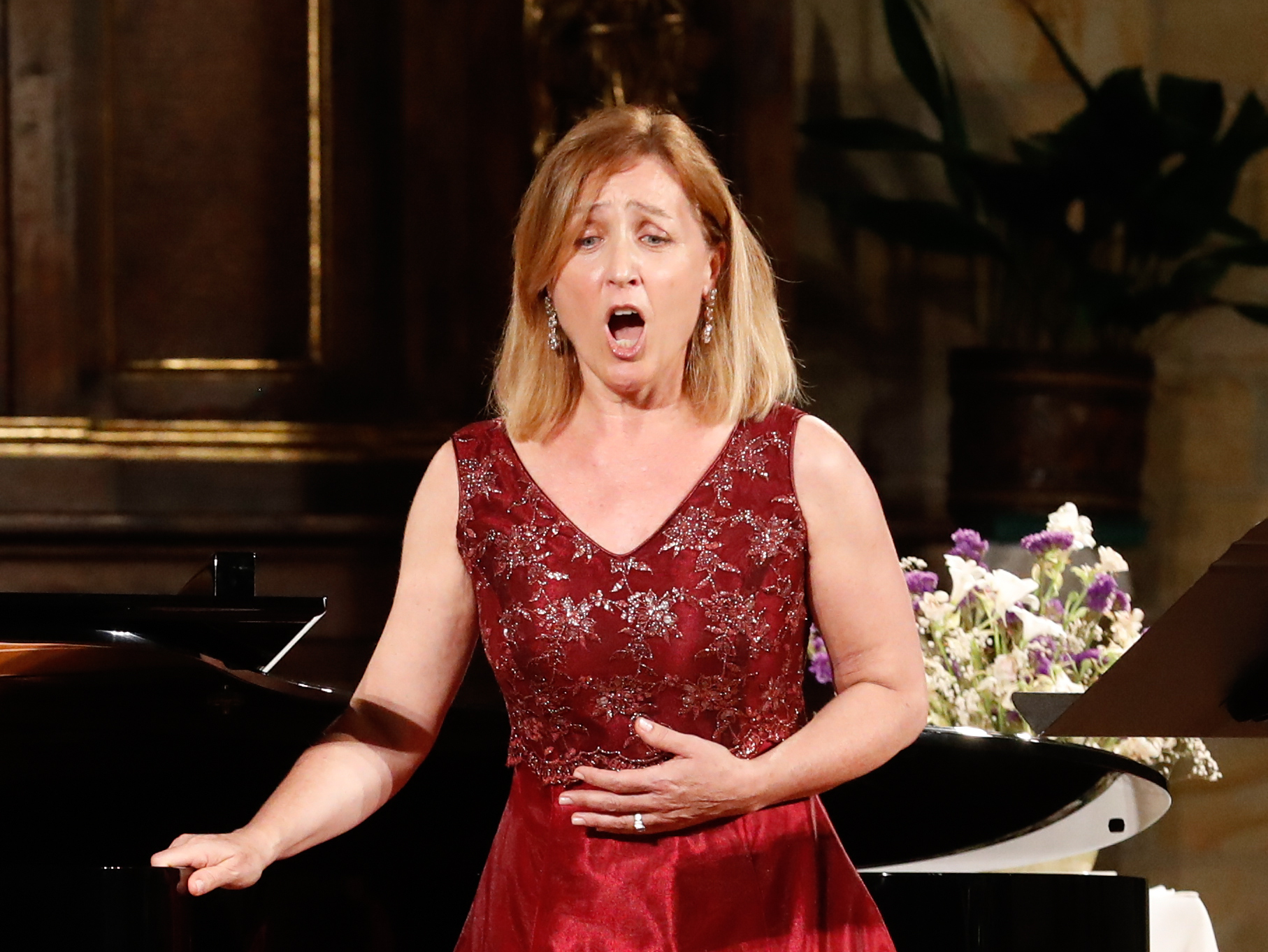
- Born: 1964 (age 61–62); San Sebastián, Basque Country
- Occupations: mezzo-soprano opera singer and psychologist
- Awards: Toti dal Monte International Singing Contest, 1st place

Maite Arruabarrena Unanue (born 1964) is a Spanish-Basque mezzo-soprano opera singer and psychologist. Born in San Sebastián, she studied in Spain and in Italy, where she won first prize at the Toti dal Monte International Singing Contest. In addition to singing in Spain's leading theatres and concert halls, she has performed in Austria, France, Italy, the Netherlands, Portugal and the United States.

== Biography ==
Born in Errenteria near San Sebastián, she attended the San Sebastián Conservatory and was introduced to the world of singing by José Luis Ansorena and Coral Andra Mari. She continued her studies at the Orfeón Donostiarra Voice School where she studied under Isabel Álvarez. She then went to Italy to train with Claude Thiolas. She also graduated in psychology at the University of the Basque Country.

After winning the Toti prize in 1989, she performed in theatres and concert halls both in Spain and abroad. Her repertoire included La Cenerentola, Il barbiere di Siviglia, Così fan tutte, Le nozze di Figaro, Don Giovanni, La clemenza di Tito, Orfeo ed Euridice, Falstaff, Les contes d’Hoffmann, Rigoletto, Faust, La forza del destino, Goyescas and Viento es la dicha de amor.

She recorded works for record labels including Astré Auvidis, Accentus, Alia vox, Naxos, Tritó and Elkar.
