= Aita Donostia =

Spanish and Basque musicologist and composer

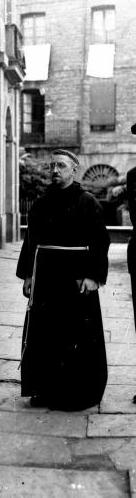
Aita Donostia in 1930

José Gonzalo Zulaica (also known as José Antonio de Donostia; 10 January 1886 – 30 August 1956), better known by his pen name Aita Donostia (lit. 'father Donostia', referring to the Basque name of San Sebastián), was a Spanish and Basque musicologist and composer.

== Life ==
He was born on 10 January 1886 in San Sebastián. From 1936 to 1943, he was in exile in France.

His most popular work is the Basque Preludes, a set of fifteen piano pieces inspired by Basque traditional music, arranged in a very romantic way, that is reminiscent of Robert Schumann's and Edvard Grieg's styles.

== Selected discography ==
- Ahots eta pianorako musika (I) - Complete music for voice and piano
- Ahots eta pianorako musika (II)
- Ahots eta pianorako musika (III) Almudena Ortega, soprano and Josu Okiñena, piano NB001 2005
- Ahots eta pianorako musika (IV) Almudena Ortega, soprano and Josu Okiñena, piano NB002 2006
