= Andrea Monrocle =

Basque actress, visual artist and painter

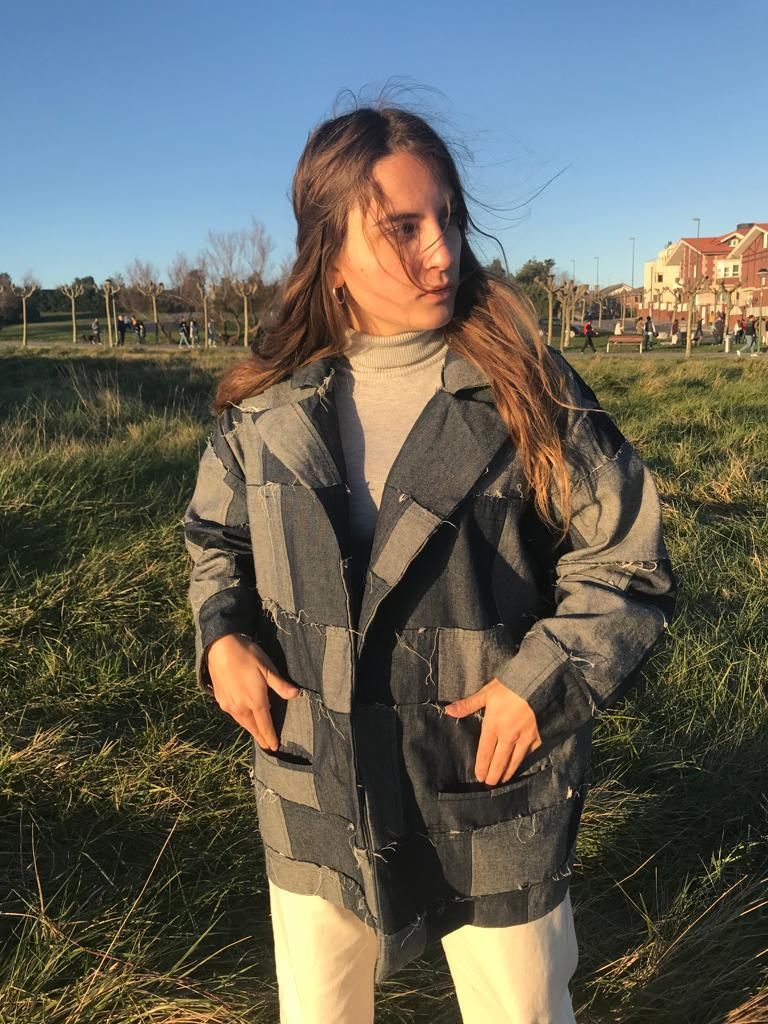
- Andrea Monrocle in 2023
- Born: Andrea Monrocle García; 11 September 1997 (age 29); Bilbao (Basque Country); Spain
- Education: Ánima Eskola School of Drama (BA); University of the Basque Country (BA)
- Occupations: Actress, visual artist and painter
- Awards: Buero Vallejo Award (2015); FETABI Award (2017)

Andrea Monrocle García (born in Bilbao on 11 September 1997) is a Basque actress, visual artist and painter.

== Life and career ==
Andrea Monrocle was born in Bilbao (Basque Country) on 11 September 1997. She attended Ibaizabal BHI high school in Bilbao, where she did secondary education (lower and upper). She then studied a bachelor's degree in fine art at the University of the Basque Country, with a specialty in painting and visual arts. Within his university studies, she also participated in a university exchange with the University of Granada, where she participated in the Cádiz Music Festival.

Monrocle also studied and trained in theatre and drama in Ánima Eskola School of Drama with David Valdelvira, Marina Shimanskaya and Algis Arlauskas, training as a method actress, under the Stanislavsky-Vakhtangov-M.Chekhov-Meyerhold methodology (Russian method), following the methodologies of the Russian classical school. There she coincided with the actors Carmen Climent, Nerea Elizalde, Julen Guerrero, Lorea Lyons and Ane Inés Landeta, together with whom she was trained. She also trained in music with Roberto Bienzobas and in dance with Rakel Rodríguez.

In 2013, she performed The Tempest, by William Shakespeare, a theatrical production at the Campos Elíseos Theatre, directed by Spanish stage director David Valdelvira, together with Nerea Elizalde and Lorea Lyons, among other cast members.

In 2014 she performed the play A Midsummer Night's Dream by William Shakespeare, a theatrical production at the Campos Elíseos Theatre, directed by Spanish stage director David Valdelvira, and with Estela Celdrán as an assistant director, together with Carmen Climent, Nerea Elizalde, Julen Guerrero, Lorea Lyons and Ane Inés Landeta, among other cast members. The theatrical production was very well received by the public, and was staged several times between 2014 and 2015. The stage production was awarded the Buero Vallejo Award (2015), in the XII edition of the awards.

In 2015 she performed the play Impossible Dialogues, a theatrical production at the Campos Elíseos Theatre, directed by Russian actress and stage director Marina Shimanskaya, based on the works The Seagull, The Cherry Orchard and Three Sisters by Anton Chekhov and on the poetry of Gustavo Adolfo Bécquer, together with Carmen Climent, Nerea Elizalde, Lorea Lyons, Ane Inés Landeta and Erika Rodríguez, among other cast members. In 2016 she performed the play Masquerade by Mikhail Lermontov, a production directed by stage director David Valdelvira and staged at the Campos Elíseos Theatre, which was presented during the week of the FETABI international festival (2016).

In 2017 she performed the play Hamlet, a stage production at the Campos Elíseos Theatre, directed by stage director David Valdelvira, and with Estela Celdrán as an assistant director, which was presented in the week of the FETABI international festival, the university theatre festival that takes place annually in Bilbao (Spain). The stage production won the FETABI Award (2017), in the categories of "Best Stage Production", "Best Adapted Text" and the Special Audience Award.

As a painter and visual artist, Monrocle has held art exhibitions in rooms such as the Sala Bizkaia Aretoa (Bilbao), the Azkuna Zentroa - Alhóndiga (Bilbao) in 2019 or the Sala Oxford Aretoa (Zumaia) in 2022. She is a member of the ARTEKOM, a research group from the University of the Basque Country on the sustainable energy transition, which works on the design of communication strategies mediated by artistic creation.

In addition, Monrocle also studied pattern making and fashion at the Nicolás Larburu training centre in Barakaldo.

== Filmography ==
=== Stage ===
Year	Title	Director	Role	Notes	Ref.
2017	Hamlet	David Valdelvira		Stage production at the Campos Elíseos Theatre / FETABI / FETABI Award	
2017	Confined humanities	Sandra Tejero			
2016	Masquerade	David Valdelvira		Stage production at the Campos Elíseos Theatre / FETABI	
2015	Impossible Dialogues	Marina Shimanskaya		Based on the works The Seagull, The Cherry Orchard and Three Sisters by Anton Chekhov and on the poetry of Gustavo Adolfo Bécquer	
2014	A Midsummer Night's Dream	David Valdelvira		Stage production at the Campos Elíseos Theatre / Buero Vallejo Award (2015)	
2013	The Tempest	David Valdelvira		Stage production at the Campos Elíseos Theatre	

=== Film ===
- 2015, Ánima Eskola Bilbao: documentary, dir. Lobke van Eijk (Student)

== Art exhibitions ==
- Sala Bizkaia Aretoa (Bilbao)
- Exhibition Hall. Faculty of Fine Arts (University of the Basque Country).
- 2019, Azkuna Zentroa - Alhóndiga (Bilbao)
- 2022, Sala Oxford Aretoa (Zumaia)

== Awards and nominations ==
=== Buero Vallejo Awards ===
Year	Category	For work	Result	Ref.
2015	Best theatrical/stage production	A Midsummer Night's Dream	Won	

=== FETABI Awards ===
Year	Category	For work	Result	Ref.
2017	Award for Best Stage Production	Hamlet	Won	
2017	Award for Best Adapted Text	Hamlet	Won	
2017	Audience Award	Hamlet	Won	

== See also ==
- Marina Shimanskaya
- David Valdelvira
- Carmen Climent
- Ánima Eskola School of Drama
