= Ane Inés Landeta =

Basque actress and filmmaker (born 1996)

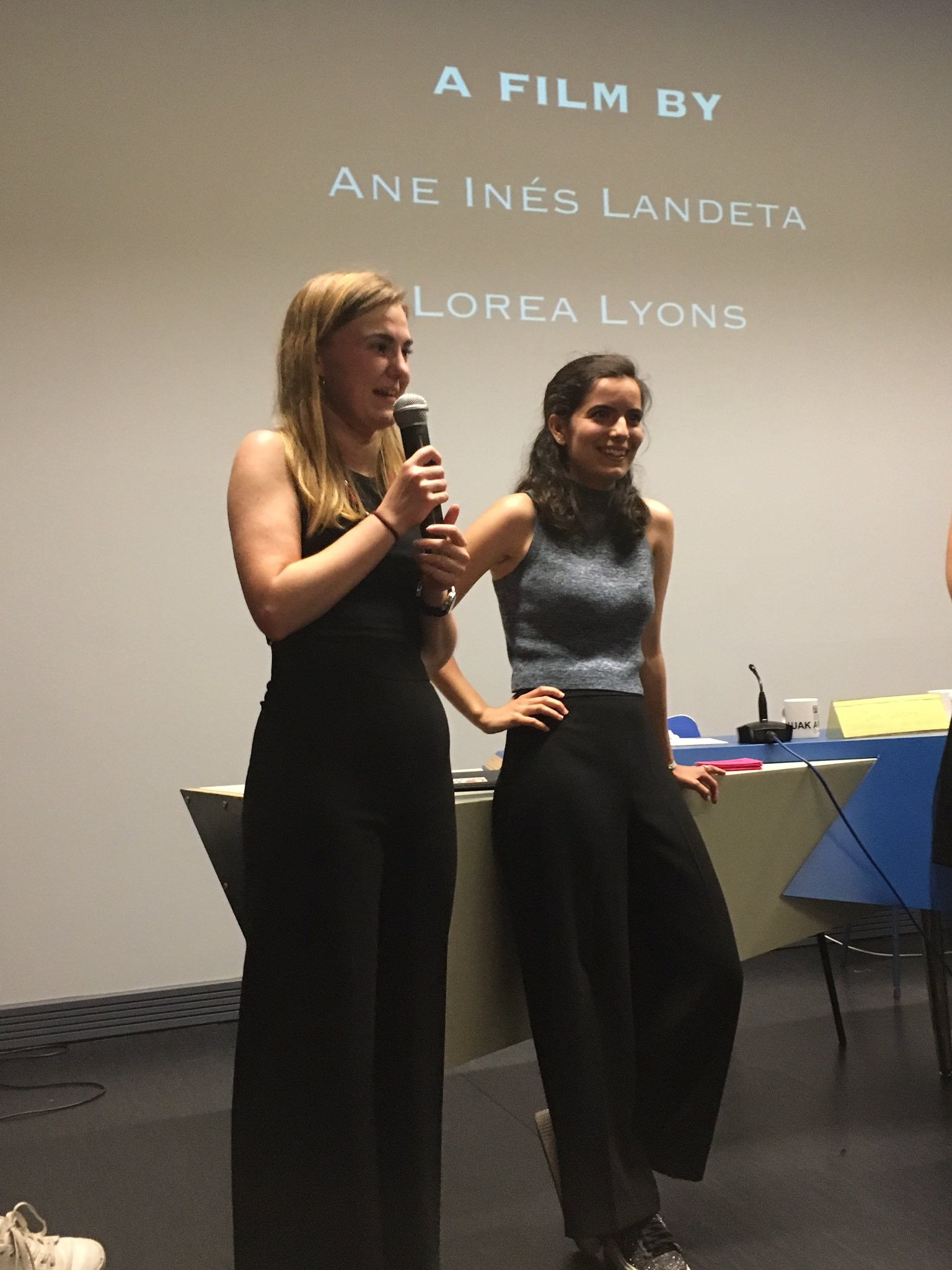
- Lorea Lyons and Ane Inés Landeta
- Born: Ane Inés Landeta Urrabaso; 15 May 1996 (age 30); Bilbao (Basque Country); Spain
- Education: Ánima Eskola School of Drama (BA); University of the Basque Country (BA)
- Occupations: Actress, visual artist, animator, director of photography and filmmaker
- Years active: 2012–present
- Notable work: Azkena
- Awards: Golden Eagle Award for the Best Short Film (2024); Buero Vallejo Award (2015)

Ane Inés Landeta Urrabaso (/ɪˈnɛs lənˈdɛtə/; born 15 May 1996) is a Basque actress, visual artist, animator, director of photography and filmmaker.

As a filmmaker, she has been awarded the Golden Eagle Award for the Best Short Film (2024) and the First Prize at the La Mirada Tabú Festival (2024), among others, for her film productions.

== Life and career ==
Lyons was born in Bilbao on 15 May 1996. She studied a bachelor's degree (BA) in fine arts at the University of the Basque Country (2014–2018). She specialized in film photography and film lighting at the Basque Country Film School (ECPV). She has developed in the field of cinematographic animation and photography direction.

Landeta also studied and trained in theatre and drama in Ánima Eskola School of Drama with David Valdelvira, Marina Shimanskaya and Algis Arlauskas, training as a method actress, under the Stanislavsky-Vakhtangov-M.Chekhov-Meyerhold methodology (Russian method), following the methodologies of the Russian classical school. There she coincided with the actors Carmen Climent, Nerea Elizalde, Julen Guerrero and Lorea Lyons, together with whom she was trained. She also trained in music with Roberto Bienzobas and in dance with Rakel Rodríguez.

In 2013 she performed the play The Lower Depths by Maxim Gorky, a production at the Campos Elíseos Theatre, directed by Spanish stage director David Valdelvira, together with Julen Guerrero, among other cast members.

In 2014 she performed the play A Midsummer Night's Dream by William Shakespeare, playing the role of Titania, a theatrical production at the Campos Elíseos Theatre, directed by Spanish stage director David Valdelvira, and with Estela Celdrán as an assistant director, together with Carmen Climent, Nerea Elizalde, Julen Guerrero and Lorea Lyons, among other cast members. The theatrical production was very well received by the public, and was staged several times between 2014 and 2015. The stage production was awarded the Buero Vallejo Award (2015), in the XII edition of the awards.

In 2015 she performed the play Impossible Dialogues, a theatrical production at the Campos Elíseos Theatre, directed by Russian actress and stage director Marina Shimanskaya, based on the works The Seagull, The Cherry Orchard and Three Sisters by Anton Chekhov and on the poetry of Gustavo Adolfo Bécquer, together with Carmen Climent, Nerea Elizalde and Lorea Lyons, among other cast members.

In 2016 she performed the play Masquerade by Mikhail Lermontov, a production directed by stage director David Valdelvira and staged at the Campos Elíseos Theatre, which was presented during the week of the FETABI international festival (2016).

== Films ==
In 2016 Landeta co-directed the short film A migas, together with Lorea Lyons, which was presented at the V Edition of the Xprest! Aux Express Film Festival, organized by Zinemakumeak Gara. The short film won the AUX Award. In 2018 she co-directed the short film Me Quiere, No Me Quiere(s), together with Lorea Lyons, which was presented at the VII Edition of the Xprest! Aux Express Film Festival. The film won the AUX Award.

Landeta has done photography and film photography work. It is part of the HauAzkena Animazio Taldea film animation group, coordinated by animator Begoña Vicario. She has participated as an animator in the making of several short films. In 2018 she participated as an animator in the short film Miraila, scripted by the writer Miren Amuriza. Also in 2018 she participated as an animator in the short film En la luna, which participated in the Zinebi Festival.

=== Azkena (2024) ===
In 2017, Landeta and Lorea Lyons began working on the short film project Azkena, a piece about motherhood. The project received the Zinebi Express AUX Award from the Zinebi Festival in 2018, the Aukera Award from the Zinebi Festival in 2021 and the Work in Progress Award from the AnimaDeba-Berria Festival in 2021. The project was chosen by the Short Film Industry Association (AIC) in the new talent program. Likewise, the audiovisual project was selected for the Aukera program of Zinebi and Zineuskadi, to continue developing the audiovisual project. With the Aukera program, the project achieved the support of director and producer Izaskun Arandia and in 2022 it was presented at international festivals, among others, at the Annecy International Film Festival.

In 2024 the short film Azkena was released, directed and written by Landeta and Lyons, and with the actress Ainhoa Larrañaga in the cast. The short film premiered in the Official Section of the Zinebi Festival (2024). The short film competed, among others, in the Official Section of the Alcalá de Henares Film Festival (2024), in the Official Section of the Aguilar Film Festival (2024), in La Mirada Tabú Film Festival (2024), in the Official Section of the Málaga Film Festival (2025) and in the Official Section of the D'A – Barcelona Film Festival (2025).

In total, the short film competed in more than twelve national and international selections in different countries such as Spain, Colombia and Bulgaria. The short film was awarded the Golden Eagle Best Short Film Caimán Critics Award at the Aguilar Film Festival in 2024 and the First Prize at the La Mirada Tabú Film Festival in 2024.

In 2024 she was part of the Zinegoak International Film Festival as a member of the Official Jury of the Festival.

== Filmography ==
=== Film ===
- 2024, Cuestión de Confianza (art direction)
- 2024, Azkena (production and direction)
- 2021, Instrucciones para caminar por la ciudad, dir. Begoña Vicario
- 2018, En la luna (animation)
- 2018, Miraila (animation)
- 2018, Me quiere, no me quiere(s), dir. Lorea Lyons and Ane Inés Landeta
- 2016, A migas, dir. Lorea Lyons and Ane Inés Landeta
- 2015, Ánima Eskola Bilbao: documentary, dir. Lobke van Eijk (herself, student)

=== Stage ===
Year	Title	Director	Role	Notes	Ref.
2016	Masquerade	David Valdelvira		FETABI / Campos Elíseos Theatre	
2015	Impossible Dialogues	Marina Shimanskaya		Based on the works The Seagull, The Cherry Orchard and Three Sisters by Anton Chekhov and on the poetry of Gustavo Adolfo Bécquer	
2014	A Midsummer Night's Dream	David Valdelvira	Titania	Stage production at the Campos Elíseos Theatre / Buero Vallejo Award (2015)	
2013	The Lower Depths	David Valdelvira		Stage production at the Campos Elíseos Theatre	

== Awards and nominations ==
=== D'A – Barcelona Film Festival ===
Year	Category	For work	Result	Ref.
2025	Short Film Audience Award	Azkena	Nominated	

=== La Mirada Tabú Film Festival ===
Year	Category	For work	Result	Ref.
2024	First Prize	Azkena	Won	

=== Aguilar Film Festival ===
Year	Category	For work	Result	Ref.
2024	Golden Eagle Best Short Film Caimán Critics Award	Azkena	Won	

=== Buero Vallejo Awards ===
Year	Category	For work	Result	Ref.
2015	Best theatrical/stage production	A Midsummer Night's Dream	Won	

=== Other awards ===
- Work in Progress AnimaDeba Award (2021) for Azkena.
- Aukera Award and Zineuskadi Award (2021) for Azkena.
- Zinebi Express AUX Award (2018) for Azkena.
- Xprest! Aux Express Film Festival AUX Award (2018) for Me quiere, no me quiere(s).
- Xprest! Aux Express Film Festival AUX Award (2016) for A migas.

== See also ==
- Marina Shimanskaya
- David Valdelvira
- Carmen Climent
