= Julen Jiménez =

Spanish film, stage and television actor

- Born: Julen Jiménez; 4 August 1994 (age 32); Amorebieta-Etxano, Spain
- Citizenship: Spain
- Education: Ánima Eskola School of Drama (BA)
- Occupations: actor, dancer
- Years active: 2012–present
- Notable work: Twin Murders: The Silence of the White City

Julen Jiménez (born 4 August 1994, Amorebieta-Etxano, Spain) is a Spanish film, theater and television actor and dancer.

== Life and career ==
He was born in the Biscayan municipality of Amorebieta-Echano in 1994. He studied, trained and graduated in theatre, drama and acting (BA) in Ánima Eskola School of Drama (2012–2016), training with David Valdelvira, Marina Shimanskaya and Algis Arlauskas, training as a method actor, under the Stanislavsky-Vakhtangov-M.Chekhov-Meyerhold methodology (Russian method), following the methodologies of the Russian classical school. He also trained in music and music theory with Roberto Bienzobas and in dance with Rakel Rodríguez. He also studied voice and oratory training with Alejandra Nóvoa.

In addition, he trained in the Grotowski technique with the Polish actor Jaroslaw Bielski and in theatrical laboratory with Richard Sahagún. He also graduated in film directing at the Basque Country Film School (2013–2015). Currently he is an actor and a dancer.

In 2016, he starred in the short film El Puente with Carmen Climent. In 2019, he played Nancho Lopidana in the film Twin Murders: The Silence of the White City, directed by Daniel Calparsoro.

In 2016 he participated in the theatrical production Cálidos y fridos, a stage production at the Campos Elíseos Theatre, based on the works by Anton Chekhov and directed by the Stage Director David Valdelvira, which was presented in the week of the FETABI international festival, the university theater festival that takes place annually in Bilbao (Spain).

== Filmography ==
=== Television ===
- 2020, Altsasu, dir. Asier Urbieta
- 2020, La línea invisible, dir. Mariano Barroso

=== Film ===
- 2018, Twin Murders: The Silence of the White City, dir. Daniel Calparsoro
- 2016, Un último capricho, dir. Joseba Hernández
- 2016, El puente, dir. Xabier Xalabardé
- 2016, Cinco minutos y medio, dir. Pablo Alonso
- 2015, Contacto desconocido, dir. Pablo Alonso
- 2013, Below, dir. Maria Zabala

=== Stage ===
- 2017, Proceso a Jesús, dir. Algis Arlauskas
- 2013–2017, Escrito en la piedra (by Claudel), dir. Algis Arlauskas
- 2016, Carmen y Antonio, dir. Algis Arlauskas
- 2016, Cálidos y fríos, dir. David Valdelvira
- 2016, Blancanieves, dir. Galder Pérez
- 2015, El primitivo auto sentimental (by Lorca), dir. Marina Shimanskaya
- 2015, Relatos de Chejov (by Chekhov), dir. David Valdelvira
- 2015, El guante, dir. David Valdelvira
- 2014–2016, El pabellón del olvido (by Chekhov), dir. David Valdelvira

=== Dance ===
- 2016, Il Barbiere di Siviglia (Opera), dir. Emilio Sagi, coreogr. Nuria Castejón
- 2016, Lucrezia Borgia (Opera), dir. Francesco Bellotto, coreogr. Martín Ruiz
- 2012–2014, Bailando el silencio, dir. Rakel Rodríguez

=== Opera ===
- 2017, Andrea Chénier, dir. Alfonso Romero
