= Nerea Elizalde =

Basque film, stage and television actress, singer and dancer

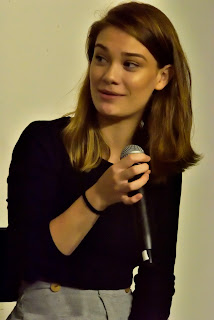
- Nerea Elizalde in the presentation of the stage production "Like a Cold Wind"
- Born: Nerea Elizalde Zamakona; 18 June 1998 (age 28); Bilbao (Basque Country); Spain
- Education: Ánima Eskola School of Drama
- Occupations: actress; dancer; singer
- Years active: 2010–present
- Notable work: Si fueras tú Goazen
- Relatives: Unai Elizalde (brother)
- Awards: Buero Vallejo Award (2015)

Nerea Elizalde Zamakona (born in Bilbao on 18 June 1998) is a Basque film, theatre and television actress, singer and dancer.

She has worked on several audiovisual productions, films and television series, such as Si fueras tú (La 1), Goazen (ETB 1), Ángela (Antena 3) or Zeru Ahoak (EITB/RTVE). She has also worked on multiple stage productions, with acclaimed performances, including A Midsummer Night's Dream (2014), Romeo and Juliet (2017) or Last train to Treblinka (2018).

== Life and career ==
Nerea Elizalde was born in Bilbao (Basque Country) on 18 June 1998. She studied secondary education (lower and upper) at the Karmelo-Solokoetxe School (high school) in Bilbao.

Later, she studied and trained in theatre and drama in Ánima Eskola School of Drama with David Valdelvira, Marina Shimanskaya and Algis Arlauskas, training as a method actress, under the Stanislavsky-Vakhtangov-M.Chekhov-Meyerhold methodology (Russian method), following the methodologies of the Russian classical school. There she coincided with the actors Carmen Climent, Julen Guerrero, Lorea Lyons and Ane Inés Landeta, together with whom she was trained. She also trained with Argentinian stage director and drama teacher Juan Carlos Corazza.

She was also trained in music and dance since she was little and also in singing. She studied music and music theory with Roberto Bienzobas. She studied dance with Rakel Rodríguez. She plays the trikitixa.

In 2013, she performed The Tempest, by William Shakespeare, a theatrical production at the Campos Elíseos Theatre, directed by Spanish stage director David Valdelvira, together with Lorea Lyons and Andrea Monrocle, among other cast members.

In 2014 she performed the play A Midsummer Night's Dream by William Shakespeare, playing the role of Helena (leading), a theatrical production at the Campos Elíseos Theatre, directed by Spanish stage director David Valdelvira, and with Estela Celdrán as an assistant director, together with Carmen Climent, Julen Guerrero, Lorea Lyons, Ane Inés Landeta and Andrea Monrocle, among other cast members. The theatrical production was very well received by the public, and was staged several times between 2014 and 2015. The stage production was awarded the Buero Vallejo Award (2015), in the XII edition of the awards. She was part of the Ánima Youth Theatre.

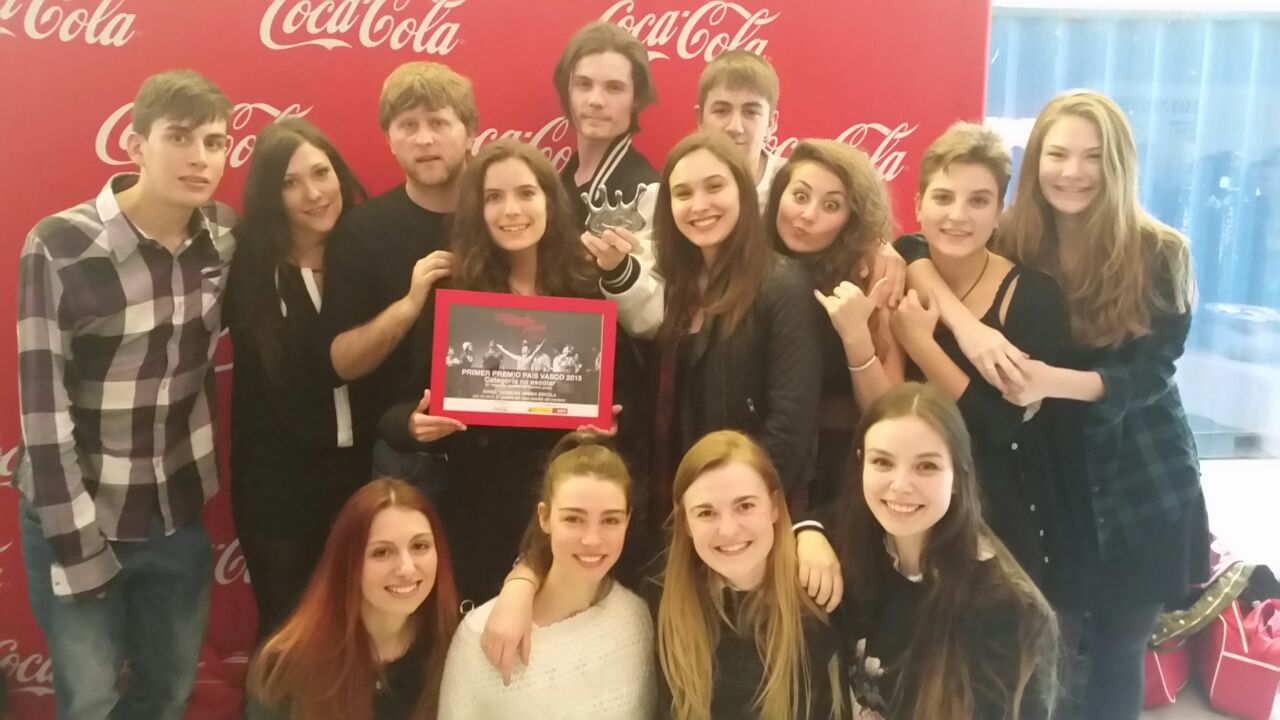
The cast of the stage production A Midsummer Night's Dream at the 12th Buero Vallejo Awards Ceremony (February 2015). The director David Valdelvira, the assistant director Estela Celdrán and the cast of the play (among them, Carmen Climent, Nerea Elizalde, Julen Guerrero, Andrea Monrocle, Lorea Lyons, Ane Inés Landeta or Miren Galán).

In 2015 she performed the play Impossible Dialogues, a theatrical production at the Campos Elíseos Theatre, directed by Russian actress and stage director Marina Shimanskaya, based on the works The Seagull, The Cherry Orchard and Three Sisters by Anton Chekhov and on the poetry of Gustavo Adolfo Bécquer, together with Carmen Climent, Lorea Lyons, Ane Inés Landeta, Andrea Monrocle and Erika Rodríguez, among other cast members.

In 2016, she joined the Pabellón 6 Youth Theatre Company in Bilbao, with which in 2017 she staged the play Romeo and Juliet directed by Ramón Barea, with Koldo Olabarri and Ainhoa Artetxe also among the cast.

Part of different theatrical productions in different parts of Spain, from 2010 to 2017 she had worked in more than 10 stage productions. En 2016 she won an award for best actress for the micro-theatre A small step for man.

Between 2016 and 2018 she performed the play Last train to Treblinka, written by Patxo Telleria and directed by Mireia Gabilondo, about Jewish children from Poland heading to an extermination camp in the era of Nazi Germany, together with Alfonso Torregrosa, José Ramón Soroiz, Eneko Sagardoy and Mikel Laskurain, among other cast members. The theatrical production was nominated for Best Stage Production at the 2018 Max Awards.

In 2018 she performed the play Like a cold wind, directed by Fernando Bernués, with Koldo Olabarri and Tania Fornieles.

In 2017 she joined the cast of the series Si fueras tú on La 1, playing the character of Nerea Vidal (leading), co-starring with Maria Pedraza and Oscar Casas.

In 2020, she joined the cast of the ETB1 series Go!azen, playing the character of Garazi.

In 2024, she joined the cast of the series Ángela produced by Antena 3, starring Verónica Sánchez, Daniel Grao, Jaime Zatarain, and Lucía Jiménez.

In 2025, she joined the cast of the series Zeru Ahoak, co-produced by EITB and RTVE, a Basque thriller, sequel to the series Hondar Ahoak, directed by Koldo Almandoz and starring Nagore Aranburu, Josean Bengoetxea, and Sara Cozar, which is set to be presented at the 73rd San Sebastián International Film Festival.

== Private life ==
As for his family, she is the sister of the also actor Unai Elizalde.

Between 2017 and 2019, Elizalde was in a relationship with actor Aritz Mendiola. They both met while filming the series Go!azen together.

== Filmography ==
=== Television ===
| Year | Title | TV channel/Producer | Role | Notes | Ref. |
|---|---|---|---|---|---|
| 2017–present | Si fueras tú | La 1 | Nerea | | |
| 2020-2021 | Go!azen 7.0 | ETB 1 | Garazi | | |
| 2021-2022 | Go!azen 8.0 | ETB 1 | Garazi | | |
| 2022-2023 | Go!azen 9.0 | ETB 1 | Garazi | | |
| 2023-2024 | Go!azen 10.0 | ETB 1 | Garazi | | |
| 2024 | Ángela | Antena 3 | Fani | | |
| 2024-2025 | Go!azen 11.0 | ETB 1 | Garazi | | |
| 2025 | Zeru Ahoak | EITB/RTVE | | | |

=== Film ===
| Year | Title | Director | Role | Notes | Ref |
|---|---|---|---|---|---|
| 2017 | La noche de las sombras | Aritz ET | Geraldine | | |
| 2019 | The Legacy of the Bones | Fernando González Molina | | | |
| 2019 | Hondale | Ainara Mentxaka | Amaia | | |
| 2021 | Hikikomori | Borja Crespo | | | |

=== Stage ===
| Year | Title | Director | Role | Notes | Ref. |
|---|---|---|---|---|---|
| 2024 | Just until tomorrow | Gorka Mínguez and David Caiña | | Erre Produkzioak / Teatro Arriaga | |
| 2022 | That place of our childhood | Ana García Peña | | | |
| 2021 | I killed my daughter Hildegart | Carmen San Esteban | Hildegart | | |
| 2018 | Like a cold wind | Fernando Bernués | | Tanttaka Teatroa / Teatro Victoria Eugenia | |
| 2016-2018 | Last train to Treblinka | Mireia Gabilondo | | | |
| 2017 | Santurtzi | Agurtzane Intxaurraga | | | |
| 2017 | Gernika: 80 urte ondoren | Agurtzane Intxaurraga | | | |
| 2016-2017 | Romeo and Juliet | Ramón Barea | Mercutio | Stage production at the Arriaga Theatre, Bilbao | |
| 2015 | Impossible Dialogues | Marina Shimanskaya | | Based on the works The Seagull, The Cherry Orchard and Three Sisters by Anton Chekhov and on the poetry of Gustavo Adolfo Bécquer | |
| 2014 | A Midsummer Night's Dream | David Valdelvira | Helena | Stage production at the Campos Elíseos Theatre / Buero Vallejo Award (2015) | |
| 2013 | The Tempest | David Valdelvira | | Stage production at the Campos Elíseos Theatre | |
| 2012 | The nights of full moon (Les nits de lluna plena) | David Valdelvira | | Stage production at the Campos Elíseos Theatre | |

== Awards and nominations ==
=== Buero Vallejo Awards ===
| Year | Category | For work | Result | Ref. |
|---|---|---|---|---|
| 2015 | Best theatrical/stage production | A Midsummer Night's Dream | Won | |

== See also ==
- Marina Shimanskaya
- David Valdelvira
- Carmen Climent
- Ánima Eskola School of Drama
