= Koldo Olabarri =

Spanish film, stage and television actor

- Born: Koldo Abando Olabarri; 19 November 1992 (age 33); Bilbao, Spain
- Citizenship: Spain
- Education: Ánima Eskola School of Drama (BA)
- Occupation: actor
- Years active: 2010-present
- Notable work: Official Competition
- Awards: Buero Vallejo Award (2011, 2013)

Koldo Abando Olabarri (born 19 November 1992, Bilbao, Spain), known as Koldo Olabarri, is a Spanish film, theater and television actor.

== Life and career ==
He studied, trained and graduated in theatre, drama and acting (BA) in Ánima Eskola School of Drama with David Valdelvira, Marina Shimanskaya and Algis Arlauskas, training as a method actor, under the Stanislavsky-Vakhtangov-M.Chekhov-Meyerhold methodology (Russian method), following the methodologies of the Russian classical school. There he coincided with actress Ainhoa Artetxe, with whom he studied. He also trained with Argentinian stage director and drama teacher Juan Carlos Corazza.

Since 2010, he has worked in more than a dozen theatrical productions, more than a dozen television series and more than a dozen movies. In 2010, he performed the play Shadows of Forgotten Ancestors, directed by Spanish stage director David Valdelvira and staged at the Campos Elíseos Theatre. The stage production was awarded the Buero Vallejo Award (2011), in the 8th edition of the awards. In 2012 he participated in the production An ordinary day at the Moulin Rouge, a musical comedy written and directed by Spanish stage director David Valdelvira and staged at the Campos Elíseos Theatre, along with Ainhoa Artetxe among other members of the cast. The production was very well received and was taken to different theaters in 2012 and 2013. The stage production was awarded the Buero Vallejo Award (2013), in the 10th edition of the awards. He was part of the Ánima Youth Theatre.

In 2016 he joined the young theater company of Pabellón 6 in Bilbao, with which he staged the play Romeo and Juliet directed by Ramón Barea, with Ainhoa Artetxe and Nerea Elizalde also among the cast.

In the year 2021 he was part of the cast of the comedy film Official Competition, along with Spanish actors Penélope Cruz and Antonio Banderas, directed by Mariano Cohn & Gastón Duprat, premiered t the 78th Venice International Film Festival and also screened at the Toronto International Film Festival and at the San Sebastián International Film Festival.

In 2020 he was part of the cast of the theater production of the Arriaga Theatre "Erresuma/Kingdom/Reino", directed by Calixto Bieito, playing Henry VI, a play based on the main tragedies of William Shakespeare.

In 2022 he was part of the cast of the Netflix original series Intimacy, along with Itziar Ituño, Patricia López Arnaiz, Emma Suárez, Verónica Echegui and Ana Wagener.

In 2020, he had to be admitted to the hospital due to severe COVID-19.

== Filmography ==
=== Television ===
- 2022: Intimacy - Netflix
- 2020: Altsasu - ETB1
- 2020ː El Ministerio del Tiempo - La 1
- 2020: Vamos Juan - TNT Spain
- 2016/2018: Centro Médico - La 1
- 2016: Beta
- 2015: Eskamak Kentzen - ETB1
- 2014: Bienvenidos al Lolita - Antena 3
- 2012: Goenkale - ETB1
- 2012: Bi eta Bat - ETB1

=== Film ===
- 2021, Official Competition, dir. Mariano Cohn & Gastón Duprat
- 2020: Tres veces, dir. Paco Ruiz
- 2018: Ane, dir. David Pérez Sañudo
- 2018: Cuando dejes de quererme, dir. Igor Legarreta
- 2017: Versus, dir. Demetrio Elorz
- 2015: Playa de las Mujeres, dir. Iñigo Cobo
- 2013: Por un puñado de besos, dir. David Menkes
- 2012: Agua!, dir. Mikel Rueda
- 2010: (d)efecto, dir. Gotzon Aurrekoetxea
- 2010: Yerba, dir. Javier Hernández

=== Stage ===
- 2022, Sagastitarrak
- 2020, Erresuma/Kingdom/Reino, dir. Calixto Bieito
- 2018, El Último Habsburgo, dir. David Caíña, Elena Vaio
- 2017, Obabakoak, dir. Calixto Bieito
- 2016-2018, Chichinabo Cabaret, dir. Felipe Loza
- 2016-2017, Romeo and Juliet, dir. Ramón Barea
- 2016-2017, Triple Salto/Jauzi Hirukoitza, dir. Miguel Olmeda
- 2015, Planteamiento, Nudo y Desenlace, dir. Itziar Lazkano
- 2014, Romeo and Juliet, dir. Victoria Di Pace
- 2014: Egun Berri Bat, dir. Galder Perez
- 2012, An ordinary day at the Moulin Rouge, dir. David Valdelvira
- 2011, Isn't it true that we will be forever?, dir. Marina Shimanskaya
- 2010, Shadows of Forgotten Ancestors, dir. David Valdelvira

== Awards and nominations ==
=== Buero Vallejo Awards ===
Year	Category	For work	Result	Ref.
2013	Best theatrical/stage production	An ordinary day at the Moulin Rouge	Won	
2011	Best theatrical/stage production	Shadows of Forgotten Ancestors	Won	
