= Ander Barinaga-Rementeria =

Spanish film, stage and television actor, and film producer

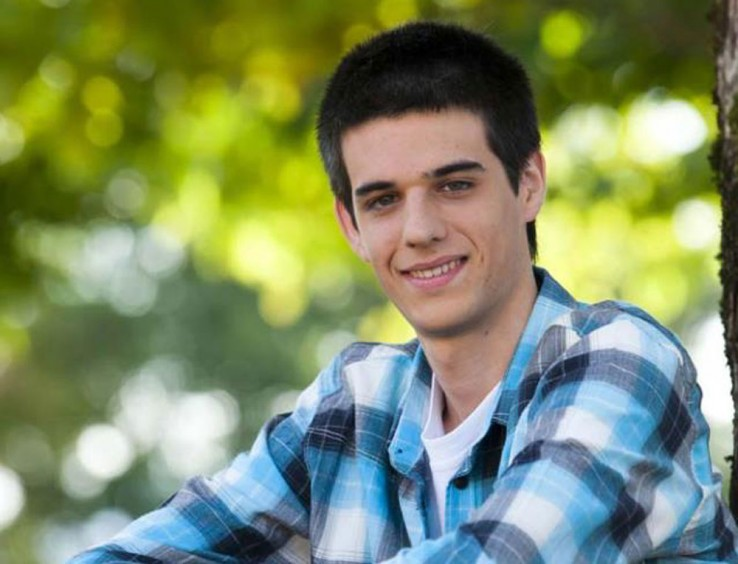
- Born: Ander Barinaga-Rementeria Arano; 13 August 1992 (age 34); Bilbao, Spain
- Citizenship: Spain
- Education: Ánima Eskola School of Drama (BA); University of the Basque Country (BA); Carlos III University of Madrid (MA)
- Occupations: actor, film producer
- Years active: 2010–present
- Awards: Buero Vallejo Award (2008)

Ander Barinaga-Rementeria Arano (born 13 August 1992, Bilbao, Spain) is a Spanish film, theater and television actor and film producer.

== Life and career ==
He studied, trained and graduated in theatre, drama and acting (BA) in Ánima Eskola School of Drama with David Valdelvira, Marina Shimanskaya and Algis Arlauskas, training as a method actor, under the Stanislavsky-Vakhtangov-M.Chekhov-Meyerhold methodology (Russian method), following the methodologies of the Russian classical school.

He got a bachelor's degree in audiovisual communication at the University of the Basque Country (UPV/EHU), specializing in multimedia production and realization. She later studied a master's degree in film industry management at the Carlos III University of Madrid.

Since 2010, he has worked in more than a dozen theatrical productions and differente television series and films. He was a member of the theater group Eufrasia: Capital Teatral. She first came to prominence on the EITB Media television series Goenkale playing Jokin Odriozola (2010–2013).

In 2008 he received the Buero Vallejo Award for the best actor in a theatrical/stage production, for the play Vivir será primero/Live will be first, directed by Txema Pérez and Alicia Gómez.

He is also a film producer. He has worked as a film production teacher at different schools, including the Basque Country Film School.

== Filmography ==
=== Television ===
- 2010–2013, Goenkale, ETB 1 (as Jokin Odriozola)

=== Film ===
- 2022, Ilargi guztiak
- 2021, Harria eta Bidea
- 2019, Padre no hay más que uno, dir. Santiago Segura
- 2019, ¿Qué te juegas?, dir. Inés de León
- 2018, Ola de crímenes, dir. Gracia Querejeta
- 2018, Oreina/Ciervo, dir. Koldo Almandoz
- 2016, Rendezvous, dir. Guillermo Julián and Román Santiago Pidre
- 2015, Txarriboda, dir. Javier Rebollo and Alvar Gordejuela.
- 2013, Gosea, dir. Itziar Cantero
- 2012, Ateak

=== Stage ===
- 2011, The Cherry Orchard, by Anton Chekhov, dir. Marina Shimanskaya, stage production at the Campos Elíseos Theatre
- 2010, A Straw Hat from Italy, by Eugene Labiche, stage production at the Campos Elíseos Theatre
- 2010, Trees Die Standing, by Alejandro Casona, stage production at the Campos Elíseos Theatre
- 2010, M'hijo el dotor, by Florencio Sánchez, stage production at the Campos Elíseos Theatre
- 2009, Nobody pays here!, by Dario Fo
- 2008, Live will be first, dir. Txema Perez and Alicia Gomez
- 2007, Neither more nor less

== Awards and nominations ==
=== Buero Vallejo Awards ===
| Year | Category | For work | Result |
|---|---|---|---|
| 2008 | Best theatrical/stage production | Vivir será primero/Live will be first | Won |
| 2008 | Best actor (in a theatrical/stage production) | Vivir será primero/Live will be first | Won |
