= Julen Guerrero Calvo =

Spanish film, stage and television actor

Julen Guerrero
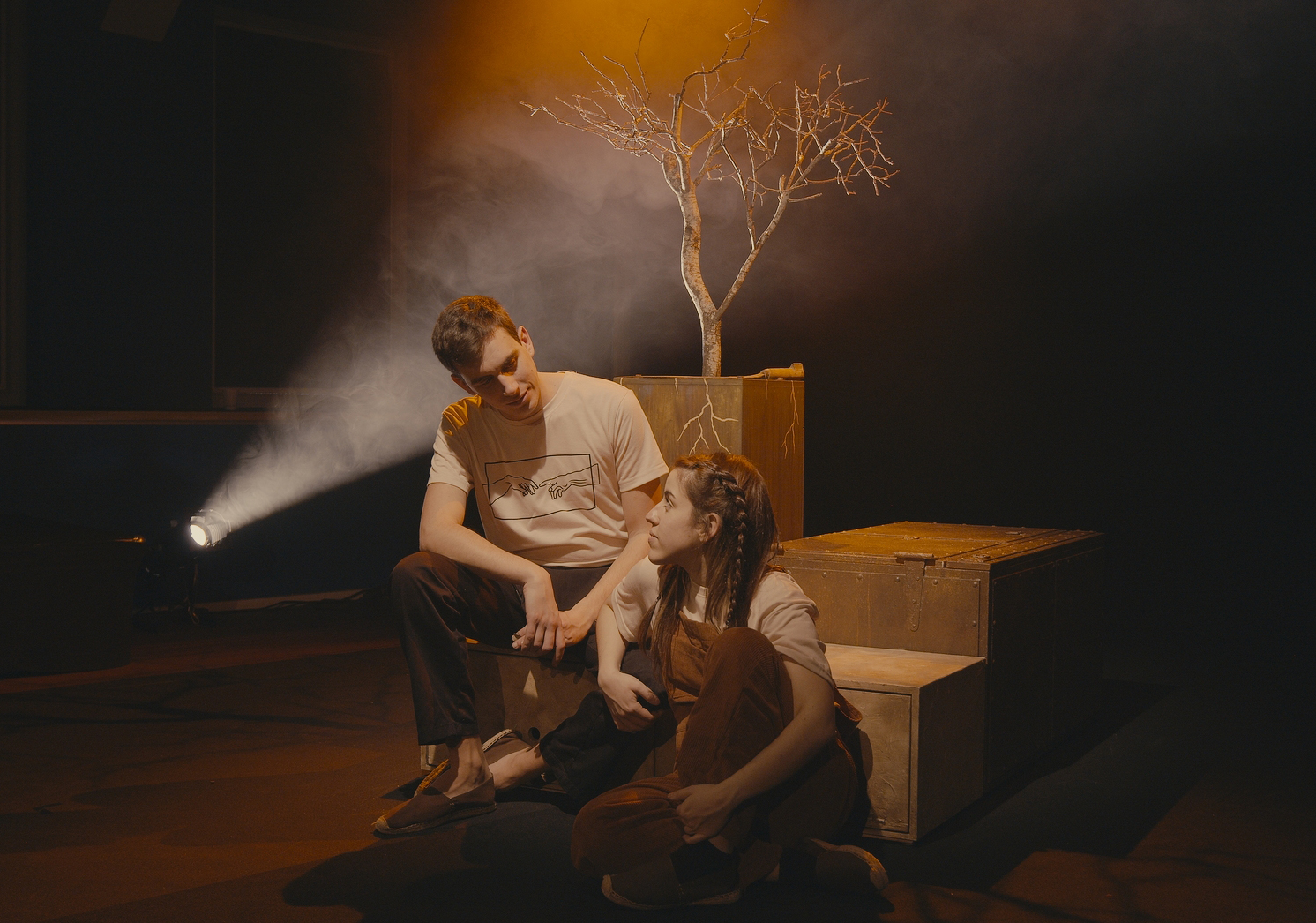
- Stage production "The loaves and the fishes" (2022).
- Born: Julen Guerrero Calvo; 27 March 1996 (age 30); Castro Urdiales, Spain
- Citizenship: Spain
- Education: Ánima Eskola School of Drama; Higher School of Dramatic Art of Castilla y León; Complutense University of Madrid
- Occupations: Actor, stage director, dramaturgue
- Years active: 2008–present
- Awards: Buero Vallejo Award (2015)

Julen Guerrero Calvo (born in Castro Urdiales on 27 March 1996) is a Spanish film, theatre and television actor and stage director.

== Life and career ==
He was born in Castro Urdiales in 1996. From a young age he was attached to the theater, participating in different plays.

He studied and trained in theater and drama in Ánima Eskola School of Drama with David Valdelvira and Sandra Tejero, training as a method actor, under the Stanislavsky-Vakhtangov-M.Chekhov-Meyerhold methodology (Russian method), following the methodologies of the Russian classical school. There he coincided with the also actresses Carmen Climent, Nerea Elizalde, Lorea Lyons and Ane Inés Landeta, together with whom he was trained.

He graduated in theatre and drama at the Higher School of Dramatic Art of Castilla y León of Castile and Leon (ESADCyL) (2015–2019), specializing in stage direction and dramaturgy. Afterwards, he studied a master's degree in contemporary thought and scenic creation also at the Higher School of Dramatic Art of Castilla y León (2019–2020).

In 2013 he performed the play The Lower Depths by Maxim Gorky, a production at the Campos Elíseos Theatre, directed by Spanish Stage Director David Valdelvira, together with Ane Inés Landeta, among other cast members.

In 2014 he performed the play A Midsummer Night's Dream by William Shakespeare, playing the role of Theseus, a theatrical production at the Campos Elíseos Theatre, directed by Spanish Stage Director David Valdelvira, and with Estela Celdrán as an assistant director, together with Carmen Climent, Nerea Elizalde, Lorea Lyons and Ane Inés Landeta, among other cast members. The theatrical production was very well received by the public, and was staged several times between 2014 and 2015. The stage production was awarded the Buero Vallejo Award (2015), in the XII edition of the awards.

In 2017 he participated in the play Fuegos (Fires), written by Lola Blasco. The play won the "Best Show" award at the Valladolid International Festival. In 2019, he directed the play Yo, eromeno, a play about two men who maintain a relationship, with the collaboration of playwright and stage director José Manuel Mora Ortiz. The work won the second prize at the Youth Art Contest of the Youth Institute of Castile and Leon. The stage production had a notable reception and was performed in different theaters throughout Spain, among others, at the Euskalduna Palace in Bilbao, in Durango or in Madrid.

In 2019 he participated in the work The Seagull (by Chekhov). The performance was selected to be performed in Saint Petersburg (Russia), in an international theater festival, in which several plays from different countries are selected to be performed for two weeks at the festival.

During the years 2019 and 2020 he was selected as an assistant director in two large theatrical productions. The first, Yerma (by Lorca), directed by Pepa Gamboa and starring María León. The second, In the words of Jo... Little Women, based on the novel Little Women.

Guerrero is a co-founder and member of the theater company Atrote Teatro (created in 2017), with which he has staged works such as A slight discomfort (2018), I, eromen (2019) or The loaves and the fishes (2022). In 2022 the company was selected within the residency framework of the "MeetYou" Festival in Valladolid.

In 2022 he staged the play The loaves and the fishes (Los panes y los peces), co-directed by Guerrero and Popy Vegas, at the "MeetYou" Festival in Valladolid. The staging was very well received and was taken to other theaters in Spain.

== Filmography ==
=== Television ===
- 2020, The Heritage Project, International Media Ministries

=== Stage ===
Year	Title	Director	Role	Notes	Ref.
2022	The loaves and the fishes (Los panes y los peces)	Popy Vegas and Julen Guerrero Calvo	Abel	Within the "MeetYou" Festival in Valladolid	
2021	Mother's Love (Amor de Madre)	Julen Guerrero Calvo			
2021	In loop (En Bucle)	Nina Reglero		Award for Best Theater Show at the Ciudad Rodrigo Theater Fair	
2019–2020	In the words of Jo... Little Women	Pepa Gamboa / Julen Guerrero Calvo (asist.)			
2019–2020	Yerma	Pepa Gamboa / Julen Guerrero Calvo (asist.)		Starring María León	
2019	Yo, erómeno (I, eromen)	Julen Guerrero Calvo			
2018–2019	The Seagull			On tour to Saint Petersburg (Russia)	
2018	A slight discomfort (Un ligero malestar)	Julen Guerrero Calvo			
2018	Ágora	Nina Reglero			
2017	Fuegos (Fires)	Nina Reglero			
2014	A Midsummer Night's Dream	David Valdelvira	Theseus	Stage production at the Campos Elíseos Theatre. Buero Vallejo Award (2015).	
2013	The Lower Depths	David Valdelvira	Satine	Stage production at the Campos Elíseos Theatre	
2013	Gypsy Ballads	Sandra Tejero		Stage production at the Campos Elíseos Theatre	

== Awards and nominations ==
=== Buero Vallejo Awards ===
Year	Category	For work	Result
2015	Best theatrical/stage production	A Midsummer Night's Dream	Won
