= Marina Shimanskaya =

Russian actress, stage director, pedagogue and drama teacher

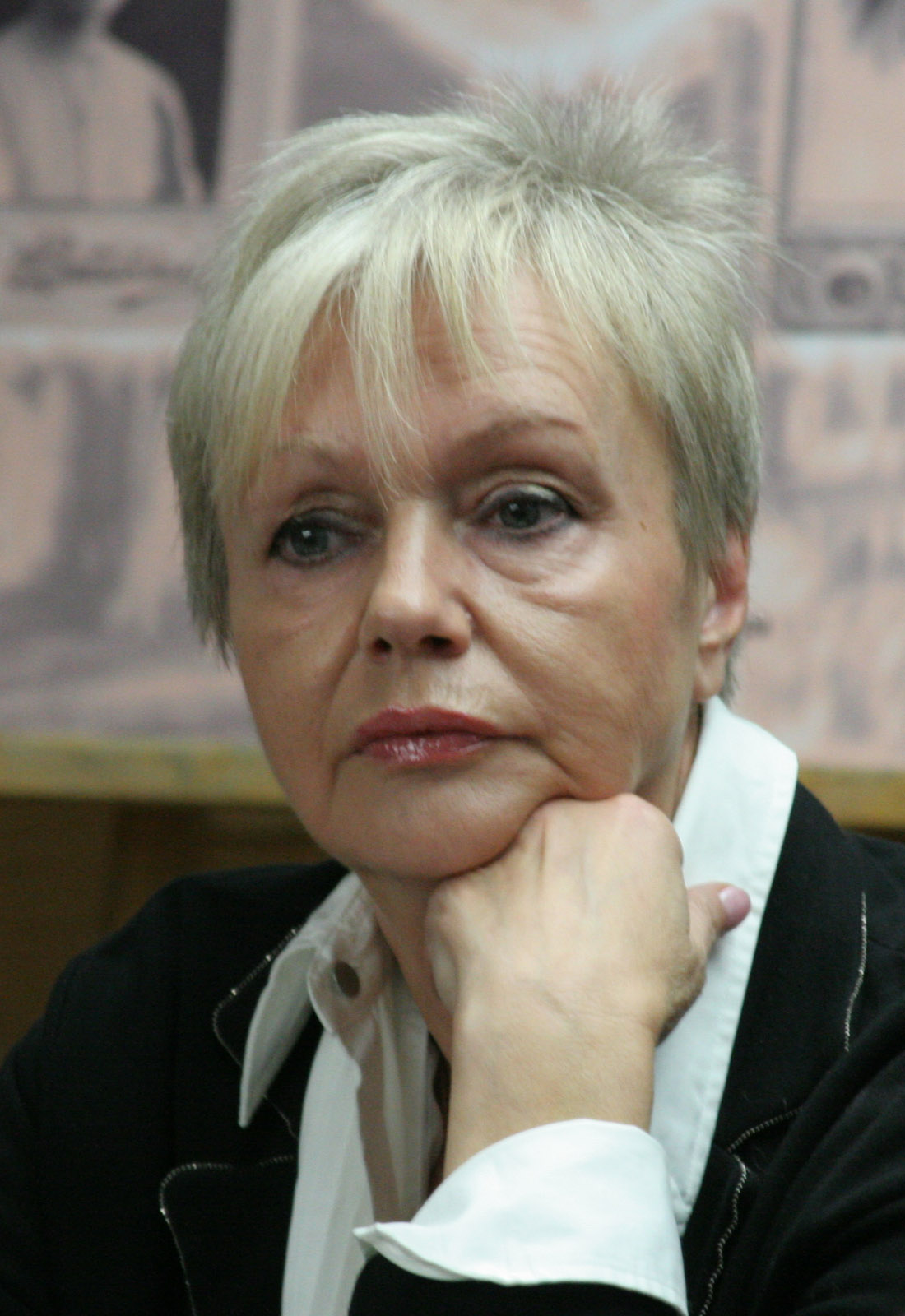
- Marina Shimanskaya in 2012
- Born: Marina Mechislavovna Shimanskaya; 27 October 1955 (age 71); Saratov, Russian SFSR, Soviet Union
- Other name: The Lady of Stages
- Citizenship: Soviet Union (until 1991); Spain
- Education: Russian Institute of Theatre Arts
- Occupation: Actress
- Years active: 1979-present
- Movement: Stanislavski's system and Russian method acting
- Spouse: Algis Arlauskas (m. 1981; div. 2016)
- Children: 2
- Family: Olga Arlauskas
- Awards: Ercilla Award

Marina Mechislavovna Shimanskaya (Russian: Марина Мечиславовна Шиманская; born 27 October 1955) is a Soviet-born Spanish actress, pedagogue and theatre teacher.

In her professional career there are more than twenty major performances in the most popular theaters such as Sovremennik Theatre, Hermitage Theatre or Chiot Nechet, more than fifteen films and several television series, such as Goenkale (EITB Media), The Crown (Netflix) or You Can't Wait-Ne dozhdyotes (Premier).

She has developed her teaching work in various European Drama schools (colleges, universities and free-standing institutions), distinguishing herself for the development of the Stanislavski's system and the Russian method acting (the Stanislavsky-Vakhtangov-M.Chekhov-Meyerhold methodology).

== Early life and family ==
Shimanskaya was born on 27 October 1955 in the town of Saratov (Soviet Union, at that time), on the banks of the Volga in Russia.

Her father is Mechislav Iosifovich Shimansky, a descendant of Polish aristocrats who owned a family property near Zhitomir (Ukraine). His parents (Marina's grandfather and grandmother), as well as his older brother, Leonid Iosifovich Shimansky (Marina's uncle), were shot.

Mechislav Iosifovich Shimansky was imprisoned in the Saratov forced labor camp accused of being an "enemy of the regime" of the USSR because his mother was of German origin and descendants of Polish aristocrats. Her mother was a nurse at the Saratov prison hospital and it was there that they met. Marina was born in a settlement (camp) in "bunkhouses with long corridors and tiny rooms".

In 1981 Shimanskaya met the Russian-Spanish actor and director Algis Arlauskas during the filming of the movie "Taking care of women", with whom he married and had two children, Olga Arlauskas (Russian director) in 1981, a Russian film director, and Alejandro in 1990, divorcing in 2016.

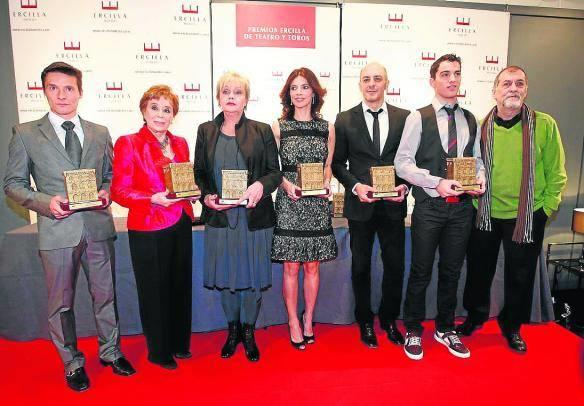
Ercilla Awards (2010). From left to right: Diego Urdiales, Julio Trujillo, Marina Shimanskaya, Maribel Verdú, Roberto Álamo, Rubén de Eguía and Ramón Barea.

Since 1992 Shimanskaya has been working in Europe. She is an actress, stage director and dramatic art teacher. She learned Spanish to be able to read Lorca's works, whose works she enjoys.

Nowadays she lives in Bilbao (Spain).

== Education ==
At the age of 18 he moved to Moscow. She managed to enter the State Institute of Theater Arts of Russia and got a scholarship to study drama at the Russian Institute of Theatre Arts (GITIS), where she graduated. There she had as teachers the students of Konstantin Stanislavski and Michael Chekhov.

She was student of Oleg Tabakov.

== Career ==
=== 1973–1992: Early work ===
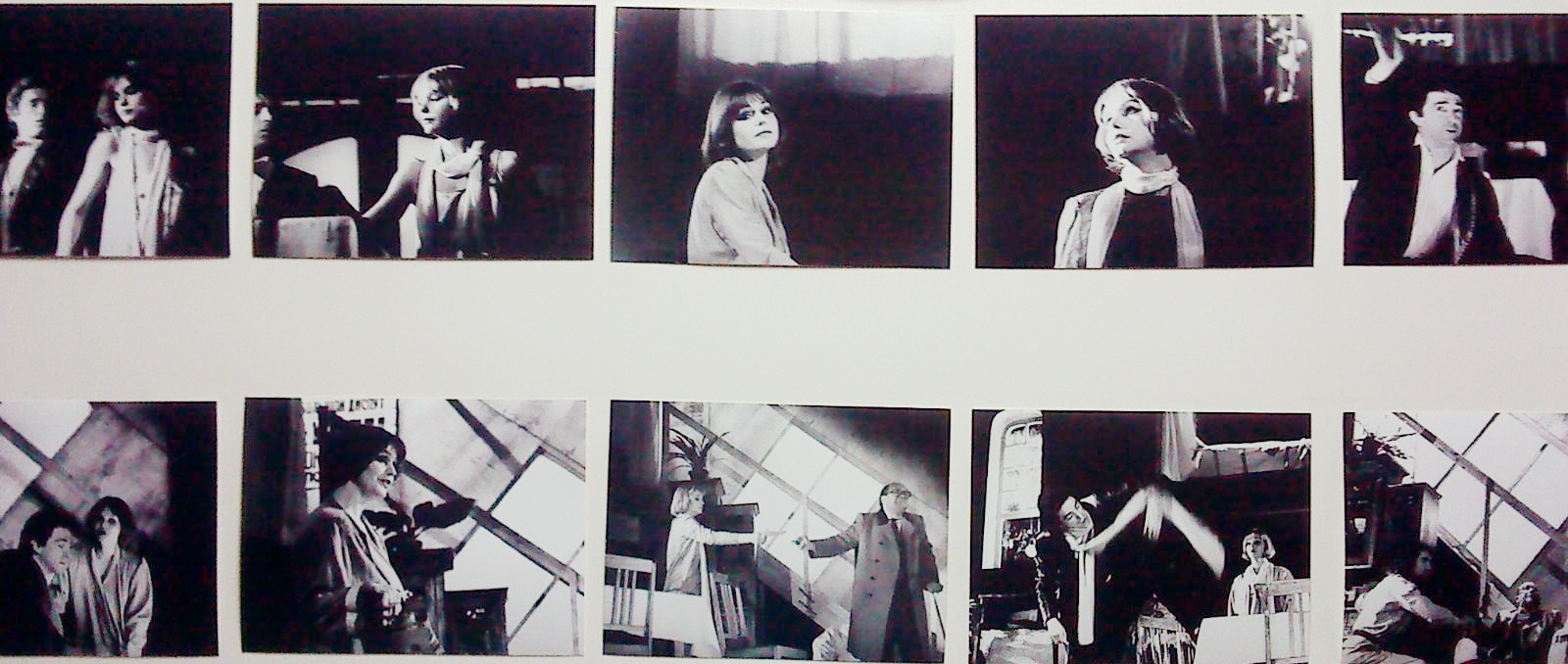
Photo composition of Marina Shimanskaya in the play "Zand", in which she performed from 1984 to 1994 together with Viktor Gvorditskiy.

Shimanskaya's debut in the cinema took place in 1977 playing Lydia Nikolaevna in the film "When I become a giant" (Когда я стану великаном). Already after the first roles in the film, in 1981, she appeared on the cover of Soviet Screen magazine. She received great fame after the premiere of the movie "Caring for Women" (Берегите женщин) in 1981.

Shimanskaya worked in many companies in Russia and starred in more than fifteen feature films, In addition to touring Europe and the United States.

She worked at the Hermitage Theater in Moscow between 1984 and 1991. In the 1991–1992 season he expanded his training under the direction of Oleg Tabakov.

=== 1992–present ===
Since 1992 Shimanskaya works in Europe. She is an actress, stage director, and drama teacher.

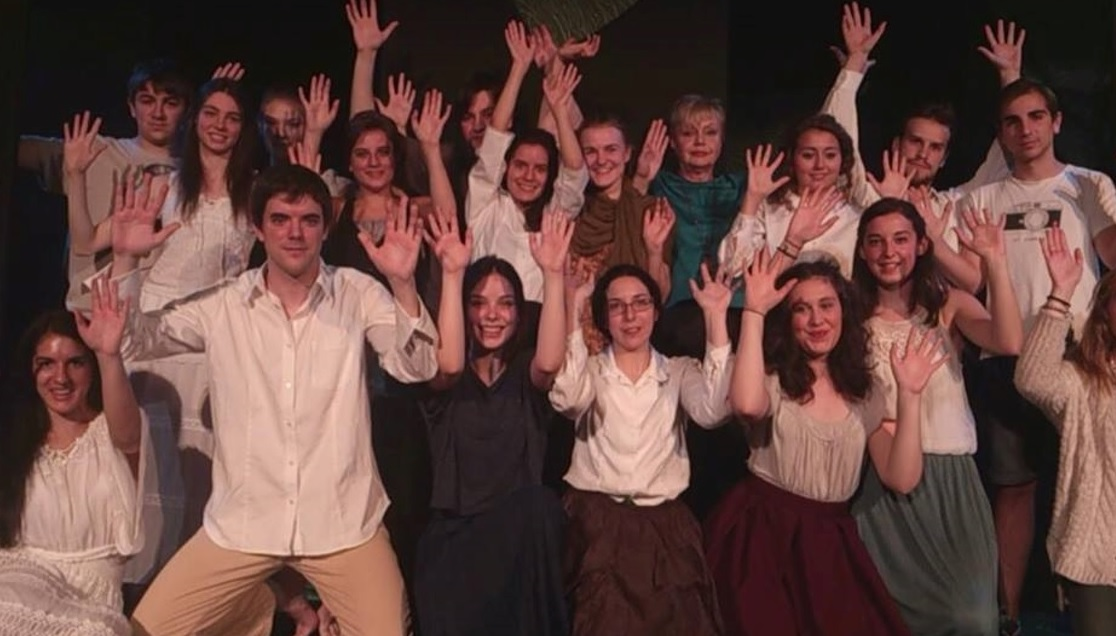
Marina Shimanskaya in 2015 in the theatrical production "Impossible Dialogues" (based on the works The Seagull, The Cherry Orchard and Three Sisters by Anton Chekhov and on the poetry of Gustavo Adolfo Bécquer), created, adapted and directed by Marina Shimanskaya and staged at the Campos Elíseos Theatre in Bilbao (Spain). Among the cast, Carmen Climent, Nerea Elizalde, Erika Rodríguez, Andrea Monrocle, Lorea Lyons, Ane Inés Landeta and Miren Galán.

In Spain she has participated in several theatre projects, directing works by Tolstoy, Chekhov, Bulgakov, Lorca and Mayorga. She has acted in Michel Gaztambide's film “Hombre sin hombre”, in Algis Arlauskas' medium-length film “Laugarren mundua” and in the ETB1 Basque television series “Goenkale”. In 2009 she starred in the feature film “El Vencedor” on Russian Television.

In 2009, together with her husband the actor and director Algis Arlauskas, she founded the drama school Ánima Eskola School of Drama where she teaches. In addition, she has taught acting classes at the University of Zaragoza and the University of Navarra, among others.

Shimanskaya is an expert in the Stanislavski's system and Russian method and she has studied and developed it, with Yevgeny Vakhtangov's, Michael Chekhov's and Vsevolod Meyerhold's (promoter of theatrical biomechanics) systems (Russian method) (also with some influences of Jerzy Grotowski), following the methodologies of the Russian school (Stanislavsky-Vakhtangov-M.Chekhov-Meyerhold methodology).

As an acting teacher, Shimanskaya is considered quite harsh and strict, although Shimanskaya herself states that "she is a lump of sugar compared to those who taught her" at the Russian Institute of Theatre Arts (GITIS), where the level of severity on the part of the teachers was very high (her teachers at the GITIS were direct students of Konstantin Stanislavski and Michael Chekhov).

In 2010 she received the Ercilla Award for Best Theatrical Career.

As a drama and acting teacher, Shimanskaya trained numerous actors and actresses following the classical Russian methodology: Aitor Luna, Galder Pérez, Guillermo Altair, Richard Sahagún, David Valdelvira, Larraitz García, Txema Perez, Borja Uribesalgo, Xabi Ortuzar, Samuel Gibert, Iratxe Hernández, Ane Pikaza, Yannick Vergara, Yeray Vázquez, Sandra Tejero, Estela Celdrán, Ander Barinaga-Rementeria, Koldo Olabarri, Ainhoa Artetxe, Julen Jiménez, Nahikari Rodríguez, Nerea Elizalde, Carmen Climent, Erika Rodríguez, Andoni Polo, Andrea Monrocle, Lorea Lyons, Ane Inés Landeta, Miren Galán, Eriz Cerezo, Ander Rovira, Josu Iriarte, and Egoitz Lucena

"I consider Marina Shimanskaya not only a wonderful acting teacher, an expert in the theory and practice of Stanislavsky's method, but a teacher of theatrical art in a broad sense. Her students receive from her the living example of a person whose commitment to the art of theater is absolute and of a moral order."

— Juan Mayorga, Spanish dramatist and National Theater Prize (2007)

In the year 2022, Shimanskaya joined the cast of the acclaimed British TV series The Crown (Netflix), playing the role of Naina Yeltsina, First Lady of Russia, with Anatoliy Kotenyov as Boris Yeltsin, Imelda Staunton as Elizabeth II and Jonathan Pryce as Prince Philip.

In 2023, Shimanskaya joined the cast of the series You Can't Wait (Ne dozhdyotes), playing the role of Raisa (Раиса), a comedy series set in a nursing home, produced by the Russian streaming platform Premier, alongside Yevgeniya Simonova, Svetlana Nemolyaeva and Tamara Syomina among other cast members.

== Filmography ==
=== Television ===
Year	Title	Channel	Role	Notes	Reference
2023	You Can't Wait (Ne dozhdyotes)	Premier	Raisa (Раиса)	6 episodes	
2022	The Crown	Netflix	Naina Yeltsina, First Lady of Russia	Ipatiev House	
2010	Goenkale	EITB Media			

=== Film ===
Year	Title	Director	Role	Notes	References
1978	When I Will Become a Giant	Inna Tumanyan	Lydia Nikolayevna, teacher of literature		
1979	Deficit on Mazaev	Valery Fokin	Kira, poet		
1980	Squadron of Flying Hussars	Stanislav Rostotsky, Nikita Khubov	Katrin		
1981	Express on Fire	Andrey Malyukov	Raisa Kostina		
1981	Morning is Wiser Than Evening	Alexander Muratov	Susanna Kholodova, nurse		
1981	Take Care of Women	Victor Makarov, Alexander Polynnikov	Lyuba, tug captain		
1982	Parents are not Chosen	Viktor Sokolov	Masha		
1982	Cultural Trip to the Theater	Valery Rubinchik	Anya, daughter of the Tikhomirovs		
1983	The Comic Lover, or Sir John Falstaff's Amorous Inventions	Valery Rubinchik	Mrs. Pei, Viscountess		
1984	Happy, Zhenya!	Alexander Pankratov	Emergency doctor		
1984	Another Man's Wife and a Husband under the Bed	Vitaly Melnikov	Glafira Petrovna, wife of Ivan Andreevich		
1984	Parade of Planets	Vadim Abdrashitov	Afonin's girlfriend		
1984	The Limit of the Possible	Pavel Kogan, Petr Mostovoy	Asya, daughter of Lena and Kostya Golikov		
1984	This Scoundrel Sidorov	Valentin Gorlov	Sidorov's mother		
1986	Next to You	Nikolay Zhukov	Sasha		
2004	Man without man (Hombre sin hombre)	Michel Gaztambide			
2009	Winner	Algis Arlauskas	Svetlana, Igor's second cousin (main character)		
2011	Fights: A Woman Classified as "Secret"	Algis Arlauskas	Natalya Sedova		
2012	In out (В ауте)	Olga Arlauskas	Voice		

=== Stage ===
- Hello, Monsieur de Maupassant (Здравствуйте, господин де Мопассан)
- Straw Hat (Соломенная шляпка)"
- Chizh and hedgehog (Чиж и еж)
- So far everything is about kay (Пока все о кей)
- The Beggar, or the Death of Zand (Нищий, или Смерть Занда)

== Awards ==
- 2010, Ercilla Award for Best Theatrical Career.
