= Carmen Climent =

Basque actress, singer and dancer

- Born: Carmen Climent Roca; 13 February 1996 (age 30); Bilbao (Basque Country); Spain
- Education: Ánima Eskola School of Drama
- Occupations: actress, singer, dancer
- Years active: 2014-present
- Notable work: Cuéntame cómo pasó
- Partner: Sergio Wolbers (2018–2021)
- Awards: Buero Vallejo Award (2015)

Carmen Climent Roca (born in Bilbao on 13 February 1996) is a Basque film, theatre and television actress, singer and dancer.

She has worked on several audiovisual productions, films and television series, such as Cuéntame cómo pasó (La 1), Terror.app (Flooxer) or Alardea (ETB 1). On stage, she has worked in different theatre productions such as A Midsummer Night's Dream (2014), Cristal Summer (2015), Luna On Beat (2018), The Legend of Time (2019) or Madrid 24h (2021).

== Life and career ==
Climent was born in Bilbao (Basque Country) on 13 February 1996. She studied and trained in theatre and drama in Ánima Eskola School of Drama with Marina Shimanskaya, David Valdelvira and Algis Arlauskas, training as a method actress, under the Stanislavsky-Vakhtangov-M.Chekhov-Meyerhold methodology (Russian method), following the methodologies of the Russian classical school. There she coincided with the actors Nerea Elizalde, Julen Guerrero, Lorea Lyons and Ane Inés Landeta, together with whom she was trained.

Later, she trained in cinema with Richard Sahagún. She was also trained in musical and lyrical singing and classical dance, with Igor Yebra, contemporary dance, jazz dance and tap dance. As a dancer, she has participated in the dance company of Rakel Rodríguez. She studied music and music theory with Roberto Bienzobas.

In 2014 she performed the play A Midsummer Night's Dream by William Shakespeare, a theatrical production at the Campos Elíseos Theatre, directed by Spanish stage director David Valdelvira, and with Estela Celdrán as an assistant director, together with Nerea Elizalde, Julen Guerrero, Lorea Lyons and Ane Inés Landeta, among other cast members. The theatrical production was very well received by the public, and was staged several times between 2014 and 2015. The stage production was awarded the Buero Vallejo Award (2015), in the XII edition of the awards.

In 2015 she performed the play Impossible Dialogues, a theatrical production at the Campos Elíseos Theatre, directed by Russian actress and stage director Marina Shimanskaya, based on the works The Seagull, The Cherry Orchard and Three Sisters by Anton Chekhov and on the poetry of Gustavo Adolfo Bécquer, together with Nerea Elizalde, Lorea Lyons and Ane Inés Landeta, among other cast members.

In December 2018, she began to record her performance as María Alcántara in the TV series Cuéntame cómo pasó from La 1.

== Private life ==
Climent had a relationship with the Madrid actor, singer and dancer Sergio Wolbers, known for the Spanish series Amar es para siempre and El príncipe. Since 2020, she has been in a relationship with web designer Alejandro Fernández.

She is the daughter of the musician and clarinetist Rafael Climent, a musician who has been a member of the Bilbao Music Band for 30 years.

== Filmography ==
=== Television ===
Year	Title	TV channel	Role	Notes	Ref.
2019	Terror.app	Flooxer	Clara	6 episodes	
2019–2023	Cuéntame cómo pasó	La 1	María Alcántara	69 episodes	
2020	Alardea	ETB1	Jone	4 episodes	

=== Film ===
Year	Title	Director	Role	Notes	Ref.
2020	Regina	Lander Ibarretxe	Carmen		

=== Stage ===
Year	Title	Director	Role	Notes	Ref.
2022	ContraAna	Paco Montes			
2021	Madrid 24h	Marc Flynn and Dídac Flores		Musical theatre. With Víctor Elías on the piano.	
2019	The Legend of Time	Carlota Ferrer and Darío Facal		Based on the work When Five Years Pass by Federico García Lorca	
2018	Luna On Beat	Antonio Martín Regueira	Luna	Musical theatre production based on the Disney Channel series Soy Luna and Violetta	
2015	The sadness of the Snail	Richard Sahagún			
2015	Cristal Summer	Richard Sahagún		Based on the work Suddenly Last Summer by Tennessee Williams	
2015	Impossible Dialogues	Marina Shimanskaya		Based on the works The Seagull, The Cherry Orchard and Three Sisters by Anton Chekhov and on the poetry of Gustavo Adolfo Bécquer	
2014	A Midsummer Night's Dream	David Valdelvira		Stage production at the Campos Elíseos Theatre / Buero Theatre Award (2015)	

== Awards and nominations ==
=== Buero Vallejo Awards ===
Year	Category	For work	Result
2015	Best theatrical/stage production	A Midsummer Night's Dream	Won
