= Sandra Tejero =

Spanish actor, drama teacher and theatre director

- Born: Sandra Tejero Ruiz; 10 July 1989 (age 36); Bilbao, Spain
- Occupations: Actress, drama teacher, theatre director
- Years active: 2007-present

Sandra Tejero Ruiz (10 July 1989, Bilbao, Spain) is a Spanish actress, theater pedagogue and theatre director.

== Life and career ==
Sandra Tejero was born in Bilbao (Spain). She studied, trained and graduated in theatre, drama and acting (BA), under the Stanislavsky-Vakhtangov-M.Chekhov-Meyerhold methodology (Russian method), following the methodologies of the Russian classical school. She also completed postgraduate studies in interpretation with Ivan Verkhovykh. She also trained in energetic theatre, stage direction and playwriting.

She was a drama teacher at the Ánima Eskola School of Drama for ten years, in the field of stage movement, interpretation and dramatized readings, specializing in poetry. She is currently an actress, stage director and theater teacher. In 2014 he directed the play The Diary of Anne Frank and the production received the award for best direction and stage space (2015). In 2018 he directed the play Yerma by Federico García Lorca, which was very well received.

As an actress, she has been a member of different theater companies. During the years 2011 and 2012 she was part of the company that staged the play When Five Years Pass of Federico García Lorca, a theatrical production directed by Iván Verkhovykh and Marina Shimanskaya. The stage production was taken on an international tour. In May 2012 it was presented in Moscow (Russia) at the Moscow Your Chance Festival (Moscow Your Chance International Theatre Festival) and in November 2012 it was presented in Saratov (Russia), at the festival in honor of Oleg Yankovsky, where Russian actors, playwrights and directors meet.

In 2015 she received the Best Theater Actress Award for the play Pabellón del olvido at the XVI International Theater Festival of Vilnius (Lithuania).

In the years 2017-2021 she was part of the Young Company of Pabellón No. 6 with which she staged the play Mi Último Baile directed by Getari Etxegarai. The play was very well received and was taken on tour to different theaters such as the Teatro Arriaga. She also staged the plays En Stanby directed by Graciela Doniz and Gris: muerte en Bilbao directed by Ane Pikaza.

In 2021 she participated in the cast of the works What country are you from? directed by Cruz Noguera and Boza, a poetic evening before crossing the border, directed by Cruz Noguera.

In 2021 she was part of the cast of the play Yo maté a mi hija Hildegart, directed by Carmen San Esteban and with Nerea Elizalde, among other members of the cast.

== Selected filmography and works ==
Some of her works

As actress (theater):

- 2021, Yo maté a mi hija Hildegart, dir. Carmen San Esteban
- 2021, Gris: morirse en Bilbao, dir. Ane Pikaza
- 2021, En Stanby, dir. Graciela Doniz
- 2021, Boza, a poetic evening before crossing the border, dir. Cruz Noguera
- 2021, What country are you from?, dir. Cruz Noguera
- 2018-2021, Mi Último Baile, dir. Getari Etxegarai
- 2019, Carmen y Antonio, dir. Algis Arlasukas
- 2015, Pabellón del olvido, dir. Marina Shimanskaya
- 2013, What to Remember, Dir. Marina Shimanskaya
- 2011–2012, When Five Years Pass, Dir. Ivan Verkhovykh and Marina Shimanskaya

As actress (films):

- 2009, Pagafantas
- 2019, El Reencuentro
- 2017, Al Romper el día
- 2014, Mucha Mierda

As theatre director:

- 2019-2020, Dalias (co-director), premiered at the Palacio Euskalduna
- 2018, Yerma
- 2017, Humedades confinadas
- 2014, El diario de Ana Frank, premiered at the Campos Elíseos Theatre
- 2014, Miau Miau (music theatre), premiered at the Campos Elíseos Theatre
- 2013, Gypsy Ballads, premiered at the Campos Elíseos Theatre
- 2012, Historia de una escalera
- 2012, El juez de los divorcios
- 2011, El público y teatro breve F.G.Lorca
- 2012, Diario de un adolescente
- 2010, Grease
- 2010, Alicia en el País de las Maravillas
- 2009, Recital poético para Lorca
- 2009, La Zapatera Prodigiosa
- 2009, Recital Vicente Aleixandre
- 2009, Poesía Ernestina de Champourcín

== Awards ==
=== XVI International Theater Festival of Vilnius (Lithuania) ===
- Best Theater Actress Award for the play Pabellón del olvido.

== See also ==
- Marina Shimanskaya
- Algis Arlauskas
- David Valdelvira
