= David Valdelvira =

Spanish actor, drama teacher, dramaturge and theatre director

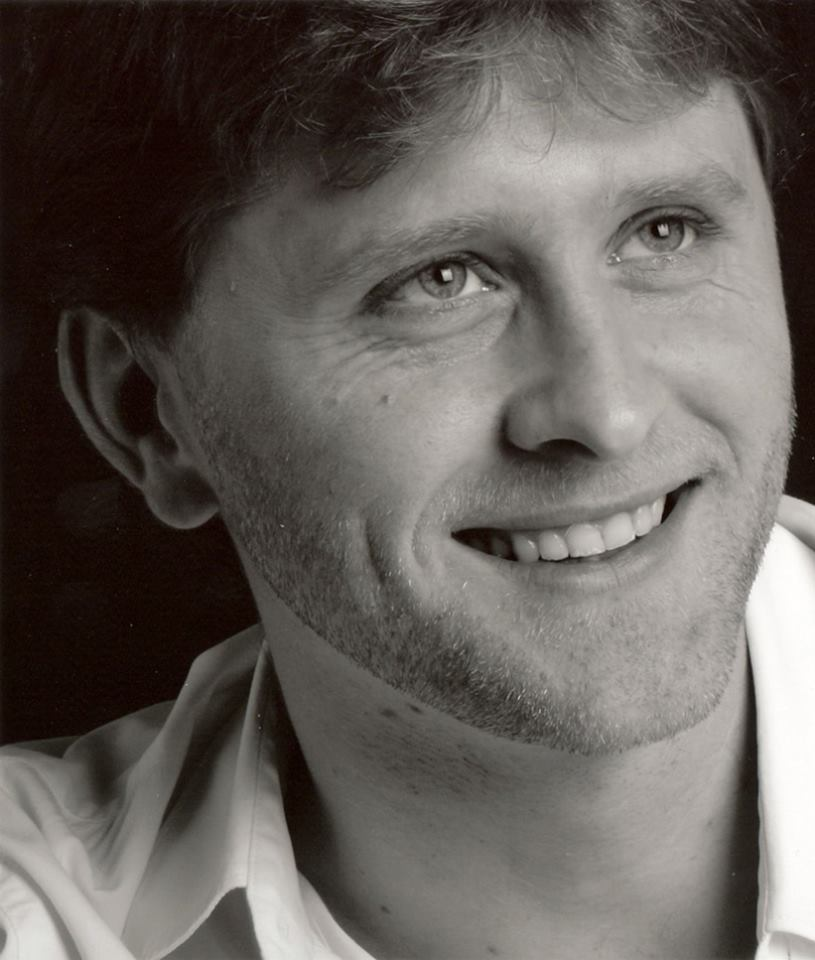
- David Valdelvira
- Born: David Valdelvira; 3 October 1977 (age 48); Bilbao, Spain
- Education: Artebi School of Drama (BA)
- Occupations: Actor, drama teacher, dramaturge, theatre director
- Years active: 2001–present
- Notable work: Qué vida más triste
- Awards: Buero Vallejo Award (2011, 2013, 2015, 2017)

David Valdelvira (3 October 1977, Bilbao, Spain) is a Basque actor, theatre pedagogue, dramaturge and theatre director.

As an actor has worked in more than a hundred theatre productions and audiovisual productions throughout Spain, among them in the Spanish TV series Qué vida más triste of LaSexta.

== Life and career ==
David Valdelvira was born in Bilbao (Spain). He completed advanced studies in dramatic art and interpretation, with Marina Shimanskaya and Algis Arlauskas, under the Stanislavsky-Vakhtangov-M.Chekhov-Meyerhold methodology (Russian method), following the methodologies of the Russian classical school. He also completed postgraduate studies in interpretation with Ivan Verkhovykh. He also trained in energetic theatre, stage direction and playwriting.

He has worked in different theatrical productions in different theaters. In february 2010 he created the "Vagón de 4ª" theater company together with Richard Sahagún. He has been an actor and director at the Moscow Pyotr Fomenko Workshop Theatre (Theatre-Atelier Piotr Fomenko) in Russia. He is currently an actor, stage director and drama teacher.

He has taught at the University of Navarra (2008–2009), at the Artebi Drama school (2007–2009) and is currently a theater pedagogue and acting teacher at the Ánima Eskola School of Drama.

As an actor, he is a member of different theater companies. During the years 2011 and 2012 he was part of the company that staged the play When Five Years Pass of Federico García Lorca, a theatrical production directed by Iván Verkhovykh and Marina Shimanskaya. The stage production was taken on an international tour. In May 2012 it was presented in Moscow (Russia) at the Moscow Your Chance Festival (Moscow Your Chance International Theatre Festival) and in November 2012 it was presented in Saratov (Russia), at the festival in honor of Oleg Yankovsky, where Russian actors, playwrights and directors meet.

As a theatre director, he has worked in a large number of stage productions. In 2012, he directed and staged the theatrical production An ordinary day at the Moulin Rouge, staged at the Campos Elíseos Theatre, with actors Koldo Olabarri and Ainhoa Artetxe among the cast. The production was very well received and was taken to different theatres in 2012 and 2013. The stage production was awarded the Buero Vallejo Award (2013), in the 10th edition of the awards.

In 2014, Valdelvira directed and staged the theatrical production A Midsummer Night's Dream, staged at the Campos Elíseos Theatre, with Estela Celdrán as an assistant director, and with actors Carmen Climent, Nerea Elizalde, Julen Guerrero, Lorea Lyons and Ane Inés Landeta, among the cast. The theatrical production was very well received by the public, and was staged several times between 2014 and 2015. The stage production was awarded the Buero Vallejo Award (2015), in the XII edition of the awards.

In 2017 he directed and staged the play Hamlet, a stage production at the Campos Elíseos Theatre, which was presented in the week of the FETABI international festival, the university theater festival that takes place annually in Bilbao (Spain), and the theatrical production won the FETABI Award (2017), in the categories of "Best Theatrical Production", "Best Adapted Text" and the Special Audience Award.

Valdelvira has been awarded the Buero Vallejo Award four times for his theatrical productions (in 2011, 2013, 2015 and 2017), for Shadows of Forgotten Ancestors (2011), An ordinary day at the Moulin Rouge (2013), A Midsummer Night's Dream (2015) and Our dear Mary Poppins (2017).

== Selected filmography and works ==
Some of his works

=== Films ===
- 2012, B de Bictoria, Dir. Oliver Mend
- 2012, On Egin, Dir. Jonaitz Urrutxi
- 2005, Sleeplessness, Dir. María Goiricelaya
- 2004, 913, Dir. Galder Gaztelu-Urrutia
- 2003, I have a dream, Dir. Olga Arlauskas

=== Television ===
- 2008–2010, Qué vida más triste, LaSexta

=== Stage (as actor) ===
- 2005, Life is a dream, Dir. Algis Arlauskas
- 2011–2012, When Five Years Pass, Dir. Ivan Verkhovykh and Marina Shimanskaya
- 2013, What to Remember, Dir. Marina Shimanskaya

=== Stage (as theatre director) ===
- 2008, The Hanger
- 2010, Shadows of Forgotten Ancestors
- 2012, The Mansion of Fear
- 2012, An ordinary day at the Moulin Rouge
- 2013, The Tempest
- 2014, A Midsummer Night's Dream
- 2016, Hot and cold
- 2016, Our dear Mary Poppins
- 2016, Masquerade Ball
- 2017, Hamlet
- 2017, La percha
- 2018, El regalo
- 2022, Who's Afraid of Virginia Woolf?

== Awards ==
Among the awards he has received as a theater director

- Buero Vallejo Award (2011), for Shadows of Forgotten Ancestors
- Buero Vallejo Award (2013), for An ordinary day at the Moulin Rouge
- Buero Vallejo Award (2015), for A Midsummer Night's Dream
- Buero Vallejo Award (2017), for Our dear Mary Poppins
- FETABI Award (2017), for Hamlet
