= Mikhail Chekhov =

Mikhail Chekhov may refer to:

- Michael Chekhov (1891–1955), Russian-American actor, known as Mikhail until the 1930s
- Mikhail Chekhov (writer) (1865–1936), Russian writer; youngest brother of Anton Chekhov
