= Estela Celdrán =

Spanish actor, drama teacher and theatre director

- Born: Estela Celdrán; 16 December 1984 (age 41); Bilbao, Spain
- Education: Ánima Eskola School of Drama (BA)
- Occupations: Actress, drama teacher, theatre director
- Years active: 2008-present
- Awards: FETABI Award (2016); Santurtzi Film Festival Award (2021)

Estela Celdrán (born 16 December 1984) is a Spanish actress, dramaturge and theatre director.

== Life and career ==
Estela Celdrán was born in Bilbao. She studied, trained and graduated in theatre, drama and acting (BA) in Ánima Eskola School of Drama, with Marina Shimanskaya and Algis Arlauskas, under the Stanislavsky-Vakhtangov-M.Chekhov-Meyerhold methodology (Russian method), following the methodologies of the Russian classical school. There she coincided with the actor Julen Jiménez, together with whom she was trained.

In 2016, she participated in the theatrical production Snow White/Blanca Nieves, playing the role of The Queen, a production directed by Galder Pérez and staged at the Campos Elíseos Theatre, premiered at the Bilbao Festival of Theatre Schools. The play won the award for best director for Galder Pérez and the award for best actress for Estela Celdrán.

In 2016 she joined the cast of the series Sol Naciente, directed by Iker Bilbao and Alberto Laguna, filmed in the Biscayan town of Amorebieta-Etxano, as one of the protagonists of the series. In 2017 she formed part of the cast of the theatrical production La Percha, directed by David Valdelvira and staged in different theatres throughout Spain.

In 2021, she received the award for best actress at the Santurtzi International Film Festival, in the ninth edition of the festival, in which actress Itziar Ituño received the Serantes award for her professional career.

She is currently an actress, stage director and theatre teacher. As an actress, she is part of the theatre company "La Sombra Teatro", founded in 2008, co-founded by Celdrán.

== Selected filmography and works ==
=== Films ===
- 2017, Recuerdos, dir. Iker Fernandez
- 2016, Una bala en Kuiper, dir. Jorge Aguirre Pérez
- 2014, El Reencuentro, dir. Iker Arce e Ibai Gómez

=== Television ===
- 2016, Sol Naciente, dir. Iker Bilbao y Alberto Laguna

=== Stage (as actress) ===
- 2022, Who's Afraid of Virginia Woolf?, dir. David Valdelvira
- 2018, El regalo, dir. David Valdelvira (La Sombra Teatro)
- 2017, La percha, dir. David Valdelvira (La Sombra Teatro)
- 2016, Snow White/Blanca Nieves, dir. Galder Pérez
- 2016, Cálidos y fríos, dir. David Valdelvira
- 2014, Yo soy la Revolución, dir. Javier Liñera (Aimara Teatro)
- 2014, Naviera Saturrarán, dir. David Caíña e Iker Arce

=== Stage (as theatre director) ===
- 2017, Hamlet (assistant director)
- 2014, A Midsummer Night's Dream (assistant director)

== Awards ==
- Buero Vallejo Award (2015), for A Midsummer Night's Dream (assistant director).
- FETABI Award (2016) to Best Actress, for Snow White.
- FETABI Award (2017), for Hamlet (assistant director).
- Santurtzi Film Festival Award (2021), to Best Actress.

== See also ==
- Marina Shimanskaya
- Algis Arlauskas
- David Valdelvira
- Sandra Tejero
