= Ivana Chubbuck =

American acting coach

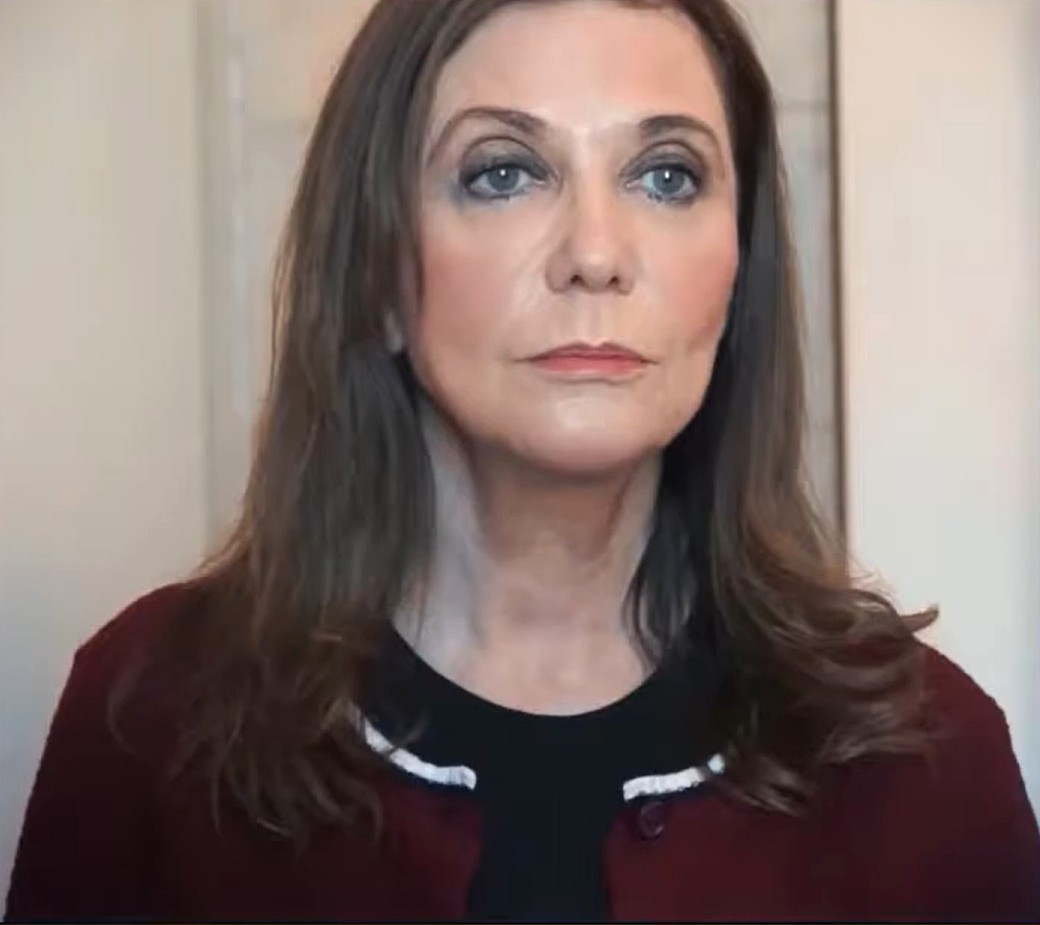
Chubbuck in 2019

Ivana Chubbuck is an American acting coach and creator of the Chubbuck technique. She heads a drama school in Los Angeles and hosts acting workshops worldwide.

Chubbuck originally worked as an actress before becoming an acting coach. Some of her notable clients include David Boreanaz, Halle Berry, Aubrey Plaza, Eva Mendes, Yael Michal, Sylvester Stallone, Judith Light, Brad Pitt, Sharon Stone, Charlize Theron, Pamela Anderson, Travis Fimmel, and Jon Voight.

She is the author of The Power of the Actor, a 2004 book that has been translated into 20 languages.

== Personal life ==
Chubbuck was married to Lyndon Chubbuck, director of The War Bride (2001) and The Right Temptation (2000), until his death in 2021. She has a daughter named Claire.
