= Calixto Bieito =

Spanish theater director

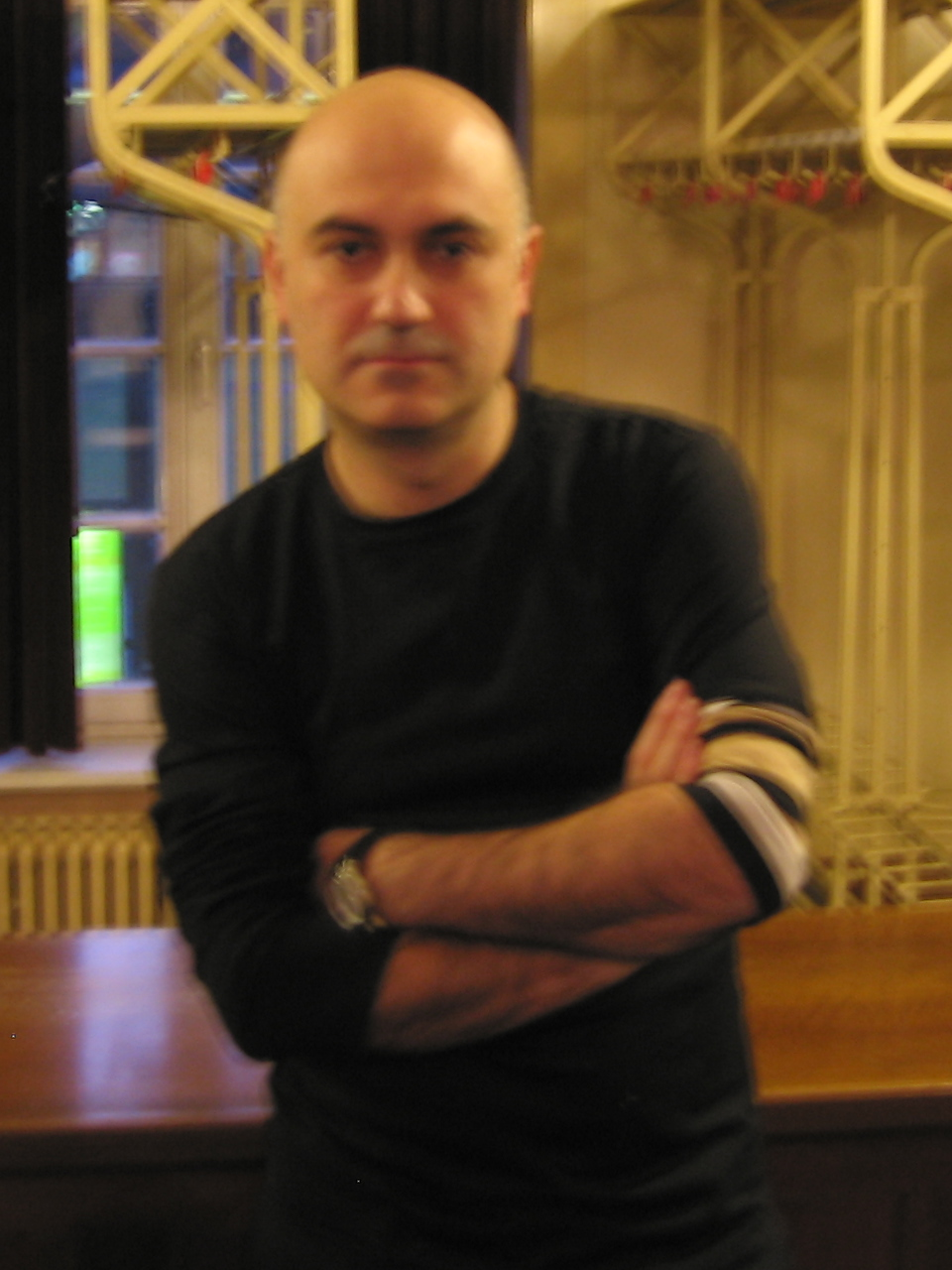
- Calixto Bieito, 2008
- Born: 2 November 1963 (age 62); Miranda de Ebro, Spain
- Occupations: Opera and Theater Director

Calixto Bieito (Miranda de Ebro, 2 November 1963) is a Spanish theater director known for his radical interpretations of classic operas.

== Biography ==
Born in the small town of Miranda de Ebro, Bieito moved to Barcelona with his family when he was 14. His mother was an amateur singer who encouraged him to play piano. His father was a railway worker, though he also shared a love of music, particularly the zarzuela tradition. Many of Bieito's uncles and cousins were musicians as well.

From 1999 to 2011, Bieito was Artistic Director of the Teatre Romea in Barcelona and from 2010 to 2012, Guest Director of the International Arts Festival of Castilla y León. Since 2017, he is Artistic Director of the opera house Teatro Arriaga in Bilbao.
