= Begoña Vicario =

Venezuelan animator

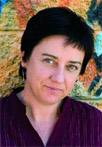
- Born: March 3, 1962 (age 64); Caracas, Venezuela
- Occupations: Animator, Director, Professor

Begoña Vicario Calvo (born March 3, 1962) is a Venezuelan-born Spanish animator and director. Over her career, she has created several animated short films, written books, articles, and papers, and organized groups of animators for collaborative film projects.

She was the recipient of a Goya Award in 1997 for her short film Ask About Me (Pregunta por mí), and has also won the Madrid Experimental Film Festival Award and the Zinebi Basque Film Grand Award. Vicario now teaches at her alma mater, the University of the Basque Country (UPV/EHU), where she is a professor of Contemporary Art at the BA and Master levels.

== Early life and education ==
Born in Caracas, Venezuela, her family moved to the Basque Country, Spain, when she was a year old. She studied at the University of the Basque Country (UPV/EHU), earning a PhD in fine art with her thesis on experimental animation. She is also a graduate of the Pilot animation studio in Moscow.

== Filmography ==
- Geroztik ere, 1993
- Hara-Hona, 1994
- Zureganako grina, 1995, 4 minutes
- Ask About Me (Pregunta por mí), 1996, 4 minutes
- Human Flesh (Haragia/Carne humana), 2000, 12 minutes
- Couplets for an Everlasting Eve (Beti bezperako koplak), 2016, 6 minutes, with the collective Agedakoplak
- Jane, Tarzan Wasn't So Cool (Jane, Tarzán no era tan guay), 2016, 3 minutes, with the collective Atxur
- The Ditch (Areka), 2017, 7 minutes
- Mirror (Miraila), 2017, 7 minutes, with the collective Armintxe
- Ehiza (Hunting), 2020, 5 minutes, with the collective Hauazkena

== Personal life ==
Vicario lives in Larrabetzu and has five children.
