= Masquerade (play) =

Play by Mikhail Lermontov

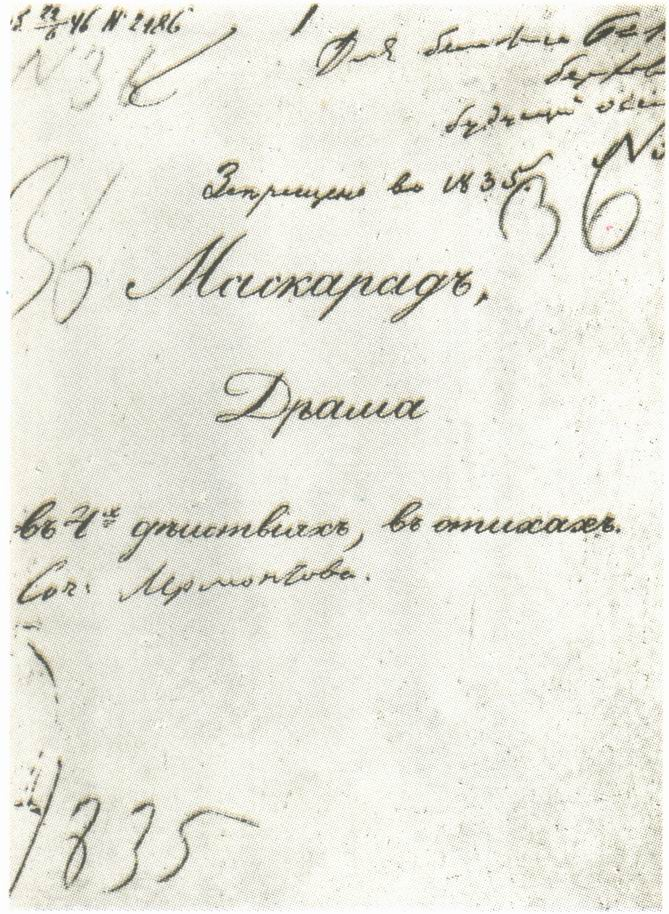
- 1835 title page
- Written by: Mikhail Lermontov
- Original language: Russian

Masquerade (Russian: Маскарад) is a verse play written in 1835 by the Russian Romantic writer Mikhail Lermontov. The four-act play, set in 1830s St. Petersburg aristocratic society, highlights the rebellious spirit and noble mind of the protagonist, Yevgeny Arbenin. It is often compared with Shakespeare's Othello in its essential story line. The play was banned for generations due to its perceived moral offense.

== Plot ==
The hero of the drama, Arbenin, is a wealthy middle-aged man endowed with a rebellious spirit and a strong will. Born into high society, he strives in vain to gain independence and freedom. He lives by the laws of his society, and, in trying to defend his honor while blinded by jealousy and pride, ends up murdering his wife.

=== Act I ===
Act I opens with Arbenin playing cards with Prince Zvezdich, and losing. Arbenin recoups his losses and gives the money back to Prince Zvezdich. From there the pair go to a masquerade party also being attended by Arbenin's wife, Nina. Zvezdich flirts with a dissolute lady, a baroness who is a friend of Nina. But because of the masks Zvezdich does not know who she is. The mystery lady gives Zvezdich her bracelet as a memento - a bracelet that had once belonged to Nina. Arbenin later notices the bracelet missing from his wife's wrist, recalls it in Zvezdich's possession, and concludes that his wife has been cheating on him with Zvezdich.

=== Act II ===
In Act II, Nina meets with the baroness. Prince Zvezdich confronts Nina with a hint about her bracelet. The Baroness, who in love with Prince Zvezdich, decides to spread the rumors that Nina and Prince Zvezdich are in love. Arbenin reads a letter from Zvezdich addressed to Nina, which leads him to further to believe that the woman behind the mask was his wife Nina. He becomes enraged, and is convinced that all St. Petersburg knows of his wife's disloyalty. Arbenin first resolves to stab Zvezdich, but considering this a too mild punishment that would not restore his honor, he considers exacting a more thorough revenge on Zvezdich and Nina.

=== Act III ===
In Act III, Arbenin mixes poison (which he had obtained years earlier after a financial setback, but never taken) into his wife's ice cream at a ball. The scene moves to the couple's bedroom, where Arbenin explains what he has done, and why. He loves her madly but, blinded by jealousy, is unable to hear the cries and protestations of innocence of his fatally poisoned wife.

=== Act IV ===
In Act IV, Nina is dead. Zvezdich and a character called The Unknown come to Arbenin, both wanting revenge. They bring him a letter from the baroness proving Nina's innocence. Arbenin, realizing that he has murdered his beloved wife without cause, goes insane.

=== Conclusions ===
The audience is, however, led to the conclusion is that Arbenin is not the only guilty party in Nina's death. The baroness and other players, with motives of their own, did not always tell the truth, allowing Arbenin's delusion to continue or indeed abetting it. Thus the meaning of the play's title, "Masquerade", may be taken in more than one way.

The play contains several monologues which serve as standalone speeches.

== History of the play ==
=== First version ===
The play was written in 1835. The original version is a three-act play that ends with the death of Nina. Lermontov, hoping to see the play produced, presented it to the office of the literary censor, which at that time was under the chief of Section Three (the secret police), Alexander von Benckendorff. The censor did not approve the play, telling Lermontov that the passions displayed were too severe and that the play implied criticism of the masked balls held by the house of Engelhardt, an aristocratic family. The drama was returned to Lermontov for correction.

=== Second version ===
Wishing to avoid radical changes in the text, Lermontov added a fourth act and introduced a new character, The Unknown. This allowed Lermontov to show Arbenin being punished for his deeds.

=== Third version ===
Still the censor did not approve the play. Lermontov then undertook a major redaction of the play, including a title change from "Masquerade" to "Arbenin". But even in this crippled form, the play did not satisfy the censor, and the play was not produced in Lermontov's lifetime.

The only version of the play that has survived is the second four-act one. Masquerade was finally staged in 1852 at the Aleksandrinsky Theater as a benefit for the actress Maria Valberhova, whom Lermontov had envisioned as Nina, although only certain scenes could be staged. Censorship of the play was lifted completely in 1862.

Perhaps the real reason that the play was not allowed to be staged is that it is based on a real incident. This is evidenced by the fact that Nina is called by the more formal name Nastasia Pavlovna - only once in the entire play, but through all versions and alterations. This was presumably a hint to the audience.
