= Buero Vallejo Awards =

Annual theatre awards in Spain

Buero Theatre Awards
- Premios Buero de Teatro
- Awarded for: Best young theatre production
- Country: Spain
- Presented by: Coca-Cola Foundation; Ministry of Culture of the Government of Spain; National Institute of Performing Arts and Music (INAEM)
- Hosted by: Teatro Valle-Inclán (Madrid) (award national gala)
- First award: 2003
- Website: Buero Awards

The Buero Theatre Awards or Buero Vallejo Awards (Spanish: Premios Buero de Teatro) are awards granted annually to theatre professionals in Spain, with the aim of rewarding and recognizing the quality of the most outstanding young theatre productions.

The awards were created in 2003 and their name is in honor of the Spanish playwright Antonio Buero Vallejo. The purpose of these awards is to reward young theatrical productions staged by (high) school theatre groups, non-school theatre groups (associations, theatre workshops...), or university theatre groups or unofficial university theatre groups (colleges, universities, drama schools...).

== History ==
The Buero Vallejo Awards were created in 2003 by the "Juan Manuel Sáinz de Vicuña" Coca-Cola Foundation and the Ministry of Culture of the Government of Spain. Currently, the National Institute of Performing Arts and Music (INAEM) also participates.

The aim of the awards is to recognize and reward the quality of young theatre productions staged by (high) school theatre groups, non-school theatre groups (associations, theatre workshops...) or university theatre groups or unofficial university theatre groups (colleges, universities, drama schools...) made up of young actors and actresses among 14 and 21 years old.

The Buero Vallejo awards are granted at the regional level, in which the regional juries choose the winning productions from each region, and at the national level, in which a national jury designates the four best productions, which represent their works, within the Youth Theatre Week in Madrid, in main and well-known theatres in the Spanish capital such as the Teatro La Latina, Teatro Valle-Inclán...

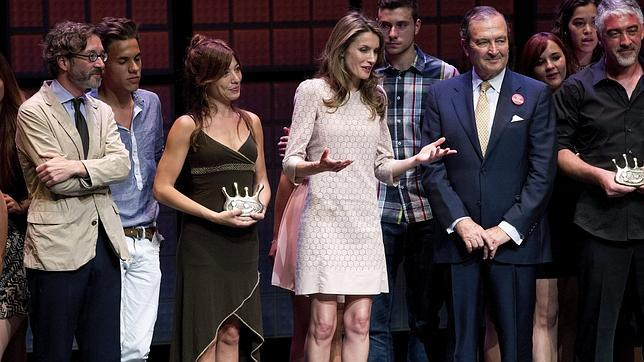
Queen Letizia of Spain at the Buero Theatre Awards ceremony at the Valle-Inclán Theatre in Madrid in 2013.

The Buero Vallejo Awards are considered a "pool of young talents". Until the year 2022, 98,000 young actors and actresses have participated in the Buero Awards and 4,990 theatrical productions and productions have been candidates for the awards since the birth of the awards in 2003.

Well-known actors and actresses have been awarded the Buero Vallejo Award. Among them: Nacho Sánchez, Chechu Salgado, Aida Flix, Natalia Huarte, Cristina García, Fabio Arrante, Jaime Riba, Ander Barinaga-Rementeria, Santi Cuquejo, Koldo Olabarri, Ainhoa Artetxe, Carmen Climent, Nerea Elizalde, Julen Guerrero, Lorea Lyons, Ane Inés Landeta, Ana Peinado...

At the regional level of the Buero Vallejo Awards, the categories of best show or theatrical production and best actor and best actress are awarded. At the national level, only the category of best show or theatrical production is awarded.

In 2020, due to the COVID-19 pandemic, the regional and national awards galas were broadcast online, in a very special gala that included the participation of actor Antonio Banderas, who defined the participants as the "future of Spanish theatre". Sergio Peris-Mencheta, Manuel Galiana, Antonio Resines, María Adánez, Carlos Hipólito, Juan Echanove, Cayetana Guillén-Cuervo and Emilio Gutiérrez-Caba also participated.

In 2013, the award ceremony was attended by the Queen Leticia of Spain.
