= Bilbao Festival of Theatre Schools =

International theatre festival

Bilbao Festival of Theatre Schools (FETABI) Festival de Escuelas de Teatro de Bilbao (FETABI)
- Genre: Theatre Festival
- Begins: June
- Ends: July
- Frequency: Annual
- Location: Bilbao (Spain)
- Country: Spain
- Established: 2012
- Participants: Drama schools, universities, professional theatre groups
- Organizer: SGAE, SGAE Foundation

The Bilbao Festival of Theatre Schools, Bilbao Festival of University Theatre, Bilbao Festival of Drama Schools or simply FETABI festival (In Spanish, Festival de Escuelas de Teatro de Bilbao or Festival de Teatro Universitario de Bilbao, abbreviated as FETABI) is an international university theatre festival that takes place annually in Bilbao, Spain.

The festival is held annually in the city of Bilbao and for around two weeks theater companies and schools (drama schools, universities, etc.) from all over Spain and Europe are selected to present their theatrical productions at the festival.

The Festival is organized by the Sociedad General de Autores y Editores (SGAE) and by the SGAE Foundation, in collaboration with other theatrical, cultural and government institutions.

== The festival ==
The Festival was established in 2012, with the aim of promoting theater, theatrical productions and talent in the performing arts. Since its creation, the Festival has been located in the city of Bilbao, at the Campos Elíseos Theatre, as the host theater. The duration of the festival is approximately two weeks, which are usually in the month of June.

At the festival, different theater companies and schools (dramatic art schools, universities, etc.) from all over Spain and Europe present their productions and are then selected to exhibit their theatrical productions at the festival. In general, the registration begins during the month of February and the celebration of the festival takes place in the month of June.

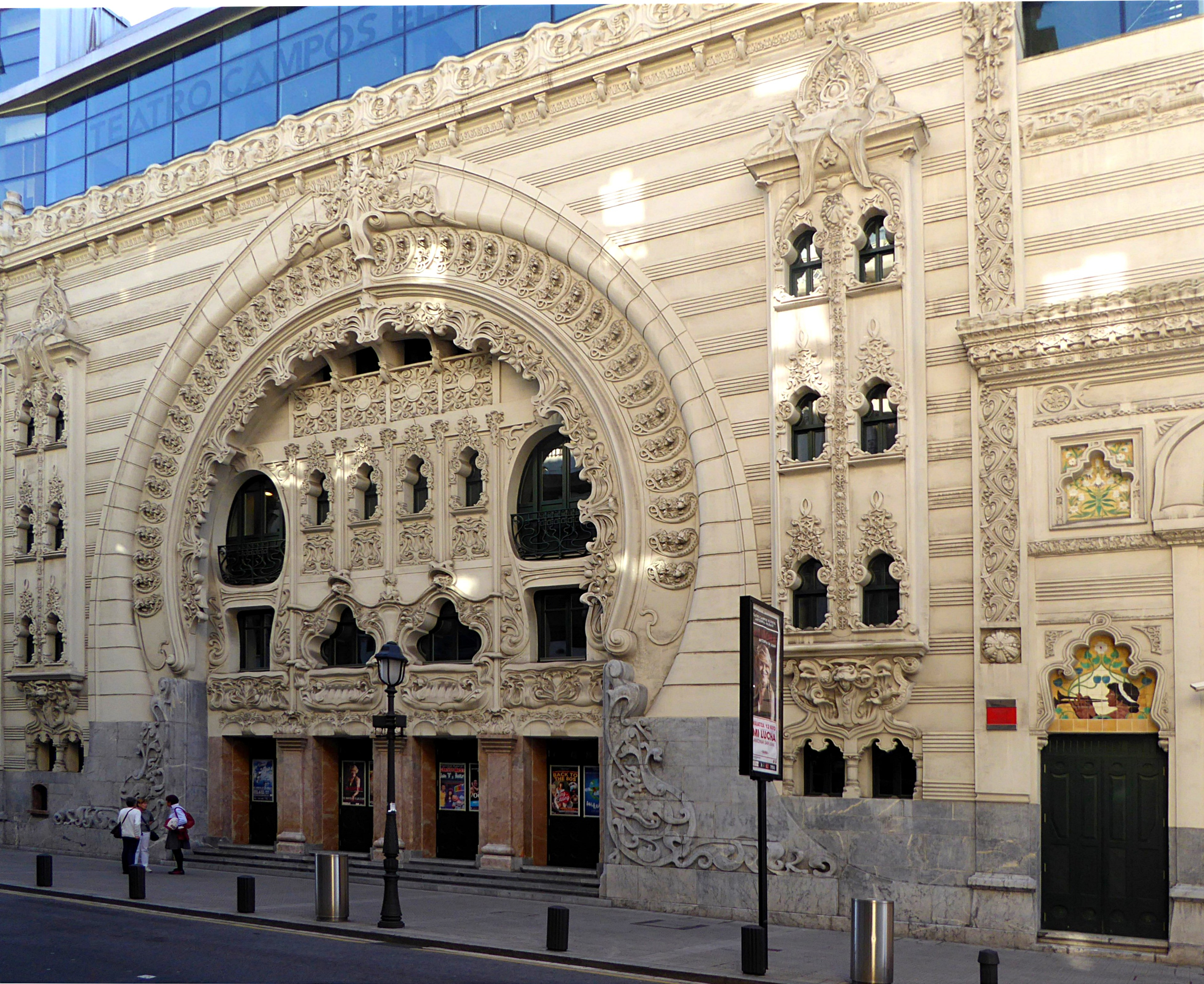
Campos Elíseos Theatre (in Bilbao), where the Bilbao Festival of Theatre Schools takes place annually.

The selection committee assesses the theatrical projects presented and chooses twenty participants, which will be selected to represent their theatrical productions during the festival.

Since the year 2017, the festival has occupied the entire Campos Elíseos Theatre in Bilbao, all its halls and auditoriums. All the rooms of the theater welcome different participants and different companies and selected performances.

The Festival is organized by the SGAE and the SGAE Foundation, in collaboration with other entities that also collaborate such as: AISGE (Performing Artists, Intellectual Property Rights Management Entity), Deabru Beltzak Theatre Company, Bilbao City Council, the Ministry of Culture, ...

Participating companies come from all over Spain and Europe. Among those that have participated or participate: Fourth Wall School, the Royal Higher College of Dramatic Art (RESAD), Autonomous University of Madrid, University of Navarra, University of La Rioja, Ánima Eskola School of Drama, Getxo Theatre School (Utopian), Nexo Teatroa, Kabia Laborategia, ...

== FETABI Awards ==
At the end of the festival, taking into account all the theatrical productions and invited companies, selected performances and exhibited performances, different prizes are distributed. In total, there are seven prizes awarded:

- Best Theatrical/Stage Production Award
- Award for Best Stage Direction
- Best Actress Award
- Best Actor Award
- Best Adapted Text Award
- Award for Best Text of Original Authorship
- Special Audience Award

In addition, since 2017, the "'FETABI Guest Company Award" has also been awarded (to a guest theatre company). The first time this prize was awarded, the TECU Group of the University of La Rioja was awarded.

== International Theatre Festivals ==
Like the Bilbao Festival of Theatre Schools, among other similar international theatre festivals in Europe we have the following ones (among others):

Name	Est.	City	Region	Country	Type
Bilbao Festival of Theatre Schools (FETABI)	2012	Bilbao	Basque autonomous community	Spain	Annual
Meeting of European Theatre Academies (META)	2015	Florence	Tuscany	Italy	Annual
International Theatre Festival (TACT Festival - Festival Internazionale di Teatro)	2014	Trieste	Friuli-Venezia Giulia	Italy	Annual
Moscow Your Chance Festival (Moscow Your Chance International Theatre Festival)		Moscow	Central Federal District	Russia	Annual
ACT Festival - International Festival for Emerging Performing Artists	2004	Bilbao	Basque autonomous community	Spain	Annual
Vitoria-Gasteiz International Theatre Festival	1975	Vitoria-Gasteiz	Basque autonomous community	Spain	Annual

== See also ==
- Meeting of European Theatre Academies (META), that takes place in Florence (Italy)
- International Theatre Festival (TACT Festival - Festival Internazionale di Teatro), that takes place in Trieste (Italy)
- Moscow Your Chance Festival (Moscow Your Chance International Theatre Festival), that takes place in Moscow (Russia)
- ACT Festival - International Festival for Emerging Performing Artists, that takes place in Bilbao (Spain)
- Vitoria-Gasteiz International Theatre Festival, that takes place in Vitoria-Gasteiz (Spain)
