= Acting coach =

Teacher who trains performers

Acting coach is a crew member in film, television and theatre giving the cast an advice and advising to enable them to improve their acting skills, preparing them for auditions and better for roles.

== Qualifications and roles ==
Acting coaches need to have a "talent...for reading people, all their utterances and body language." Acting coaches have been called "people whisperers", a reference to "horse whisperers" who help to train animals. Acting coach Ivana Chubbuck states that one of her roles is to ensure that "every actor...must know what the character's objective is in a scene—to win someone's love, respect, sympathy, whatever—and then must have a ruthlessness about achieving the objective." Chubbuck works with actors to help them to connect with the emotion inside the character. Acting coaches also "...help [drama] students audition for college". Acting coach and actor Woodell-Mascall is "...skilled at zeroing in on what young actors need to do to improve their performance." Woodell-Mascall tells one student actor to "...really think about who [the character] is and what she's feeling. It's got to be real. She provides constructive criticism to students. Woodell-Mascall has helped students to get into drama programs at schools "...including NYU, Juilliard, Rutgers and UCLA". Some acting coaches use an "...approach and technique of acting training [that] are considered established, proven methods of creating the [dramatic] work", such as using the "...methodology of Constantin Stanislavski, Stella Adler, Uta Hagen, Lee Strasberg, and Sanford Meisner."

Some acting coaches provide students with a DVD or SD card recording of their acting, for the student to review their progress.

== Notable individuals ==
Major acting coaches include: Tad Danielewski, Larry Moss, Ivana Chubbuck, Michelle Danner, Geoff Colman, Terry Schreiber, David Mamet, Lee Strasberg, Michael Woolson, Stella Adler, Chambers Stevens, Sanford Meisner, Paula Strasberg.and Hermann Killmeyer.

== Working conditions ==
Acting coaches may be freelancers who are hired for an hourly or daily rate, or they may be hired on a longer-term basis by a film studio, production company or theatre company. Some acting coaches have developed their own unique methods and founded their own acting schools. Acting coaches' income varies a great deal from one coach to another. For example, an acting coach providing training to a community theatre troupe or a high school musical earns much less than an acting coach training top Hollywood celebrities. Acting classes are often provided in person; however, with the widespread availability of high-speed Internet, some coaches offer mentoring online over Skype or other video linkups. Acting coaches may offer private coaching, group sessions or a combination of both.

== Other roles ==
In some cases, acting coaches are hired to train singers in acting skills. Popular music singers may need to learn acting skills for their live concert shows, which sometimes include staged sequences, and for performing in music videos. For example, Goth-rocker Amy Lee was provided with an acting coach by her record label. In Classical music, singers performing staged operas may get help from an acting coach to prepare them for their roles. Sometimes CEOs and other leaders hire acting coaches to help them improve their performance of speeches and other general communications activities. While most acting coaches mentor actors, some also coach directors on how to improve their direction of actors. Some acting coaches offer introductions to the acting industry, to help new actors learn about auditions, the casting process, the role of agents, key acting terminology (e.g., "callback" auditions), and about important industry organizations.

=== Intimacy coordinator ===
In the television and film industry, in 2018, some production companies are hiring an "intimacy coordinator" to ensure that actors and actresses' sexual consent is obtained before shooting romantic scenes and simulated sex scenes. To address concerns about the "vulnerability...and the massive power balance that can happen when a powerful showrunner or director asks an actress or actor...to get naked and simulate sex for the camera", HBO hires an intimacy coordinator for these scenes. The intimacy coordinator is a mix of an acting coach (who makes sure that scenes look realistic) and an advocate for actors and actresses who ensures that the onscreen performers' boundaries are respected and that their physical and emotional comfort is protected.
