= Roberto Bienzobas =

Basque musician, conductor and composer (born 1942)

Roberto Bienzobas Gárate
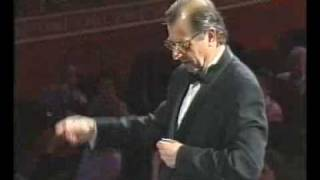
- Roberto Bienzobas in 2009
- Born: 8 October 1942 (age 83); Bilbao (Basque Country); Spain
- Occupations: Musician, conductor, composer, choir director
- Organization: Sociedad Coral de Bilbao

Roberto Bienzobas Gárate (born in Bilbao on 8 October 1942) is a Basque musician, conductor, composer and choir director.

== Life and career ==
He was born in Bilbao on 8 October 1942. Since he was young, he studied harmony, chamber music, and orchestra and choral conducting. He studied counterpoint, fugue and composition with Francisco Escudero.

He has worked as a musician and director of orchestras and choirs. He has also worked as a musician, trainer and teacher of musicians and composers in different institutions. As a musician he is trained in transverse flute, flute and piano.

As choir director, he has directed different choirs, such as the Coro Euskería of the Sociedad Coral de Bilbao, Coral Gaztelumendi, Coro de Voces Blancas Antxieta and others. He has been directing the Deustoarrak Choir created in 1957 for more than twenty years.
