= Algis Arlauskas =

Russian-Spanish actor and film director

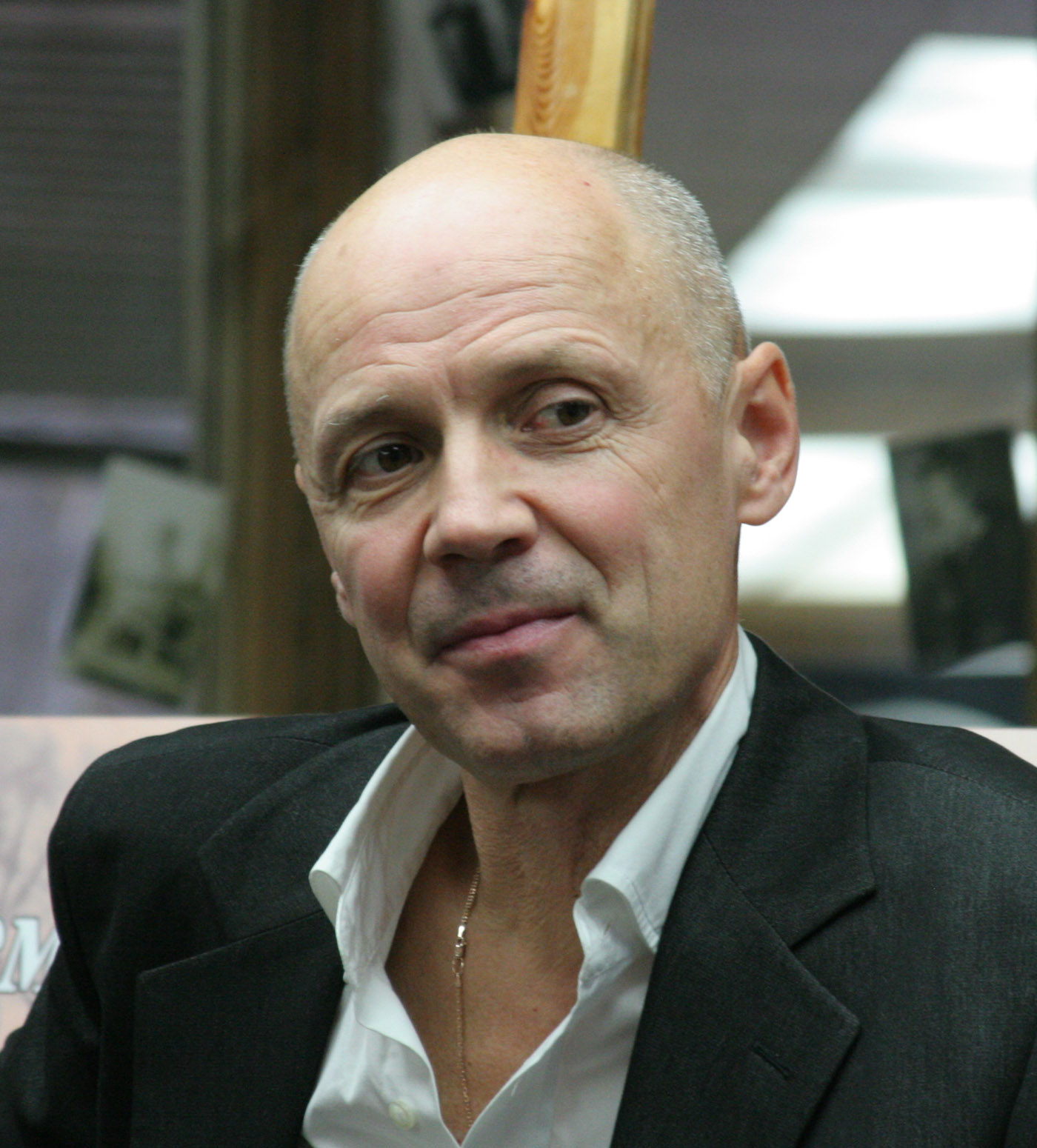
- Algis Arlauskas
- Born: Algis Iozasovich Arlauskas Pinedo; 7 August 1957 (age 68); Moscow, RSFSR, USSR
- Citizenship: Soviet Union (until 1991); Russia; Spain
- Education: Gerasimov Institute of Cinematography
- Occupations: Actor, director
- Years active: 1973–present
- Movement: Stanislavski's system and Russian method acting
- Spouse: Marina Shimanskaya (m. 1981; div. 2016)
- Family: Olga Arlauskas

Algis Iozasovich Arlauskas Pinedo (Russian: Альгис Иозасович Арлаускас; born 7 August 1957) is a Soviet-born Spanish actor, director and theater teacher.

== Life and career ==
Algis Arlauskas was born on 7 August 1957 in Moscow, then the Soviet Union (now Russia). His father, Yuozas Mikaloyusovich Arlauskas (Lithuanian: Juozas Arlauskas) (born in 1920), was a leader of the Lithuanian Communist Party and was condemned to work camps, and his mother an evacuee from Bilbao (Basque Country) following the Spanish Civil War in 1937 (these evacuees were known as "war children").

In 1978, he graduated from the Boris Shchukin Theater Institute (Higher School of Drama attached to the Vakhtangov Theater in Moscow), and in 1987 he graduated from the Film Directing faculty of the State Institute of Cinematography – VGIK (workshop of A. Kochetkov). From 1978 to 1983, he was an actor at the Moscow Young Spectators Theater.

Between 1989 and 1995, he worked as a professor of film directing and screenwriting at the Russian State Institute of Cinematography – VGIK (Faculty of Documentary Film).

In 1991, as a returnee, he arrived in Bilbao with his former wife, the actress Marina Shimanskaya, and their 2 children to make a series of documentaries about the children of the Spanish Civil War entitled Living and Dying in Russia, and after being offered several projects as a director, he decided to continue residing in the Biscayan capital.

He has worked as an actor, director and screenwriter in various film and television projects in the Basque Country and Spain. In 2008, he returned to work on Russian film projects.

He speaks Russian, Spanish, Basque, English, Italian and Portuguese.

== Filmography ==
- 1974, Grumete de la Flota del Norte, Gorky Studio URSS
- 1982, Sportloto-82, Mosfilm URSS
- 1983, Soborno, TV Central URSS
- 1986, Peter the Great, NBC USA
- 2010, Los hombres de Paco, Antena 3
- 2011 – 2013, El barco, Antena 3
- 2014, Hermanos, Telecinco
- 2014 – 2015, El Príncipe, Telecinco
- 2015, B&b, de boca en boca, Telecinco
- 2015 – 2016, Amar es para siempre, Antena 3
- 2016, El ministerio del tiempo, La 1
- 2018, Acacias 38, La 1
- 2019, Vota Juan, TNT Spain
- 2020, Caronte, Amazon Prime
- 2021, La Fortuna, Movistar+ Spain
- 2022, In from the cold, Netflix USA
