= Campos Elíseos Theatre =

Opera house in Bilbao, Spain

Coordinates: 43°15′35″N 2°55′53″W

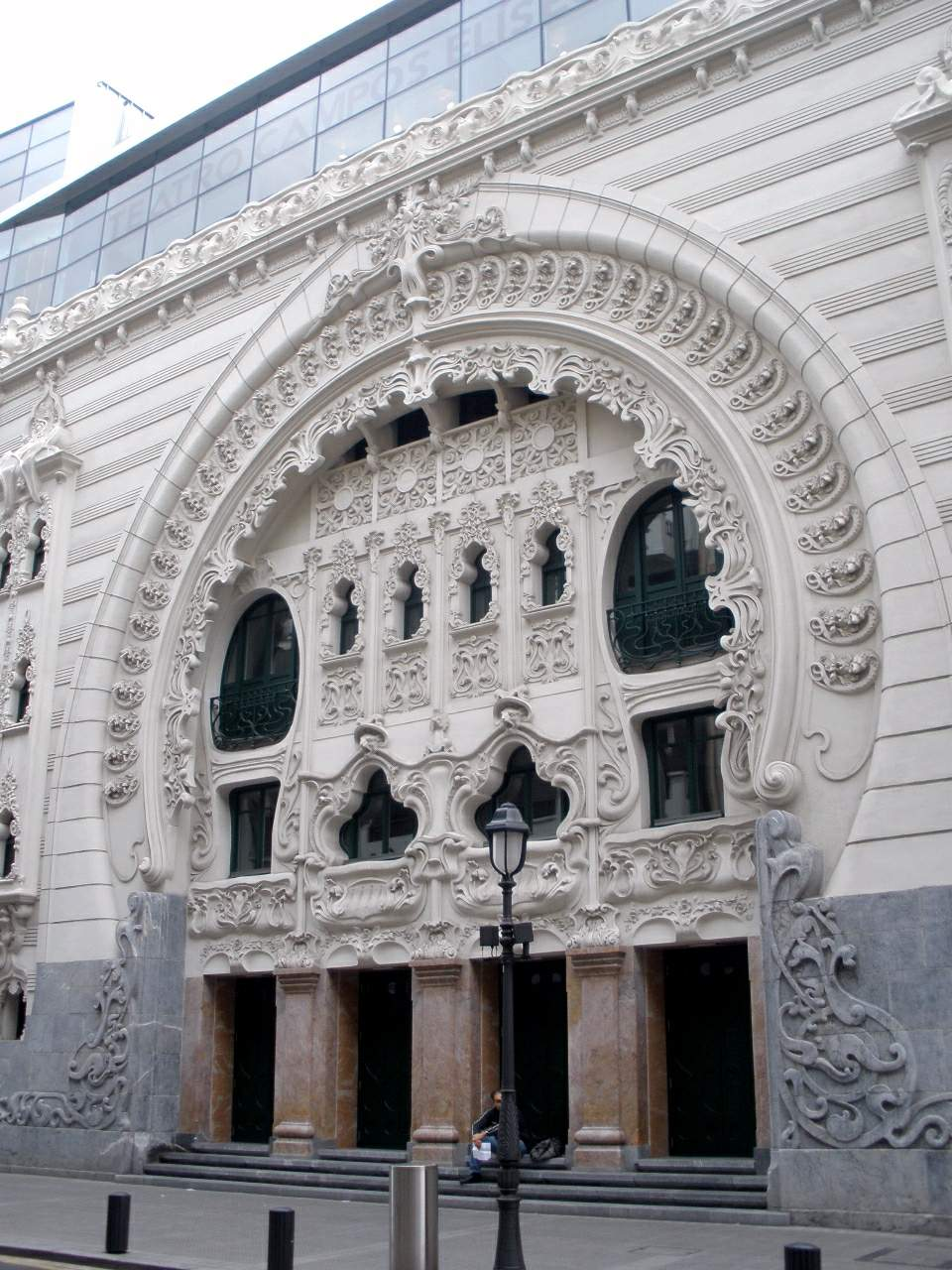
Campos Elíseos Theatreg

The Campos Elíseos Theatre (Spanish: Teatro Campos Elíseos, Basque: Campos Elíseos Antzokia) in Basque is an opera house in Bilbao, Spain. It was inaugurated in 1902. It is one of the most important theaters in Bilbao and the most technically advanced theater in Spain.

In the building, its richly decorated facade designed by the Basque-French Jean Batiste Darroquy stands out, which is the external reference of this important piece of modernist architecture in the Basque Country. The theater is listed as an Asset of Cultural Interest in the Monument category.

== See also ==
- List of opera houses
