= Mikhail Chekhov (writer) =

Russian writer and theater critic (1865–1936)

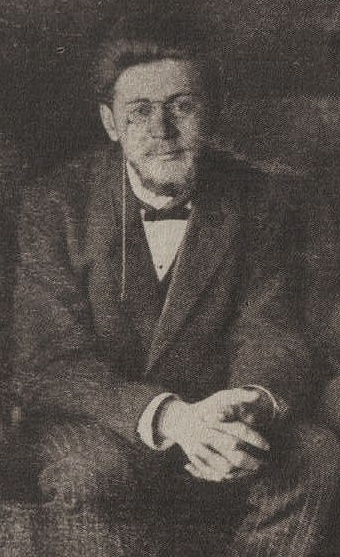
Mikhail Chekhov (1892)

Mikhail Pavlovich Chekhov (Russian: Михаил Павлович Чехов; 6 October 1865 in Taganrog – 14 November 1936 in Yalta) was a Russian writer and theater critic; the youngest brother and biographer of Anton Chekhov.

== Biography ==
He graduated at the top of his class at the Taganrog Gymnasium, then attended the Second Moscow Gymnasium, where he began contributing articles to humorous newspapers and magazines. From 1885 to 1890, he studied law at Moscow University.

From 1890 to 1898, he was stationed as a tax collector at several locations in the Moscow region. In 1891, his translation of the short story "A Rainy June" by Ouida appeared in the Bulletin of Foreign Literature. His first full book was a dictionary for farmers, published in 1894. While stationed at Uglich, he directed, designed and wrote for an amateur theater company. In 1896, he married the daughter of a local factory owner.

Two years later, he was appointed head of the Treasury Chamber (an office representing the Ministry of Finance) in Yaroslavl. He often visited the theater and published reviews in the local press. Soon, he was also contributing to Theater and Art in Moscow. By 1901, he had decided that he did not like his position or his colleagues and wanted to transfer or resign.

He moved to Saint Petersburg and became manager of the book selling stalls for the railways. After publishing several stories in Novoye Vremya, he became dissatisfied with their editorial policy and established his own journal, The European Library, but financial constraints prevented him from producing many issues. Over the next few years, he contributed to numerous periodicals under a variety of pseudonyms, including "Капитан Кук" (Captain Cook). In 1904, he published a collection of essays and stories, followed in 1905 by the novels, Синий чулок (Blue Stockings) and Сироты (Orphans). A story collection called Свирель (The Pipe) appeared in 1910. A second edition of his first collection earned him the Pushkin Prize.

From 1907 to 1917, he was the publisher, editor and almost sole contributor to Золотое детство (Golden Childhood), a magazine for children. In 1913, the magazine published an "anonymous" translation of Alice in Wonderland which was almost certainly the work of Chekhov. He also wrote for other children's publications under the pseudonym "М.Богемский" (M.Bohemia). In 1920, some these stories were published in book form. That same year, he published ten volumes of works translated from French and English.

His biography of his brother, Anton, was begun in 1905 with a series of short memoirs in the magazine Zhurnal Dlya Vsekh. More were published in 1906 and 1907. From 1911 to 1916, he worked with their sister, Maria, on compiling and editing a six volume collection of Anton's letters. In 1923, he published Антон Чехов и его сюжеты (Anton Chekhov and his Stories), followed by Антон Чехов, театр, актёры и Татьяна Репина (Anton Chekhov: Theater, Actors and Tatiana Repina) in 1925.

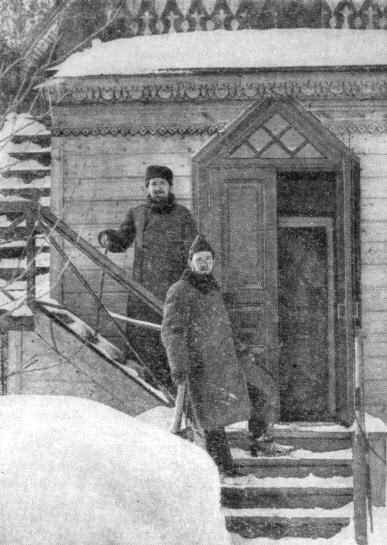
Anton and Mikhail at Melikhovo

In 1926, he became ill with angina pectoris and moved to Yalta, where he worked with Maria to create a museum at Anton's home. He also collected his own letters, worked as a consultant and catalogued Anton's personal library. In 1929, he became a member of the "All-Russian Union of Writers" and wrote Вокруг Чехова (On Chekhov), which became known as "Chekhov's Encyclopedia". In 1930, he published Антон Чехов на каникулах (Anton Chekhov on a Holiday).

He was awarded a state pension in 1932. Over the next few years, he worked on a genealogical study and a museum catalogue. He died in Yalta after a brief, but serious, illness.

== Writings in English ==
- Anton Chekhov: A Brother's Memoirs, translated by Eugene Alper, St.Martin's Press, 2009 ISBN 978-0-230-61883-1
