= Ánima Eskola School of Drama =

Drama school in Bilbao, Spain

Coordinates: 43.3019°N 2.9749°W

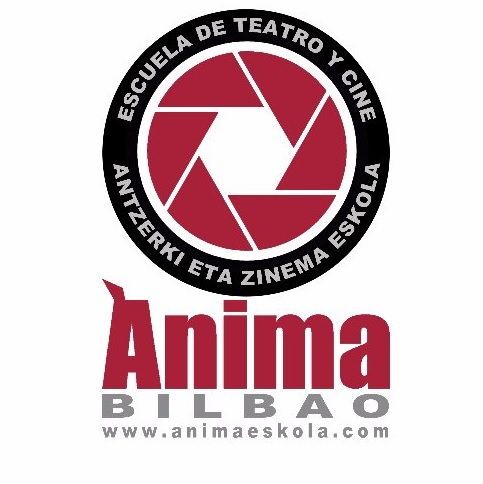
- Type: Drama school
- Established: 2009
- Chairman: Algis Arlauskas
- President: Algis Arlauskas
- Principal: Marina Shimanskaya
- Location: Bilbao, Spain
- Campus: Urban
- Website: animaeskola.com

The Ánima Eskola School of Drama (transl. Ánima School) is a drama school or drama institution in Bilbao, Spain.

Founded in 2009 by Marina Shimanskaya and Algis Arlauskas in Bilbao, since 2017 it acquired another facility in Erandio (Greater Bilbao).

The school has produced students such as the Actors and Actresses Union Award winner Aitor Luna or Carmen Climent.

== History ==
In 1992, Russian actors, dramaturges and directors Marina Shimanskaya and Algis Arlauskas arrived in Bilbao to carry out different documentary works. After several projects as directors and actors, they stayed in Bilbao.

In 2009 they founded the school in Bilbao, in the Santutxu city district, with the aim of offering higher education to actors and actresses in northern Spain, importing Russian acting methodologies.

The school's training methodology is based on the Stanislavski's system, developed with Yevgeny Vakhtangov's, Michael Chekhov's and Vsevolod Meyerhold's (promoter of theatrical biomechanics) systems (and also with some influences of Jerzy Grotowski). For this, the school usually collaborates with Russian professionals of the system. Thus, the school follows the classical Russian theatre acting method, based on the Stanislavsky, Vakhtangov, Mikhail Chekhov and Meyerhold method (Russian method acting), following the methodologies of the Russian school (Stanislavsky-Vakhtangov-M.Chekhov-Meyerhold methodology). A classical methodology imported directly by Marina Shimanskaya and Algis Arlauskas is followed, together with collaborating professors with classical Russian training such as Iván Verkhovykh.

The current principal of the school is Marina Shimanskaya and the current school coordinator is Algis Arlauskas.

Among the teaching staff and training staff are, among others, Marina Shimanskaya, Algis Araluskas, David Valdelvira, Sandra Tejero, Estela Celdrán, Pedro Rivero, Mikel Rueda, Fernando Valgañón, Ivan Verkhovykh, Itziar Lazkano, Ramón Barea, María Goiricelaya, Reyes Hiraldo, Roberto Bienzobas, Rakel Rodríguez, Denis Martínez Roque, Katya Kostrova, Eva Ausín, Daniela Bartolomé, Viorica Ceban, Mia Kalo, Moisés Morales Lorenzo, ...

== Ánima Youth Theatre ==
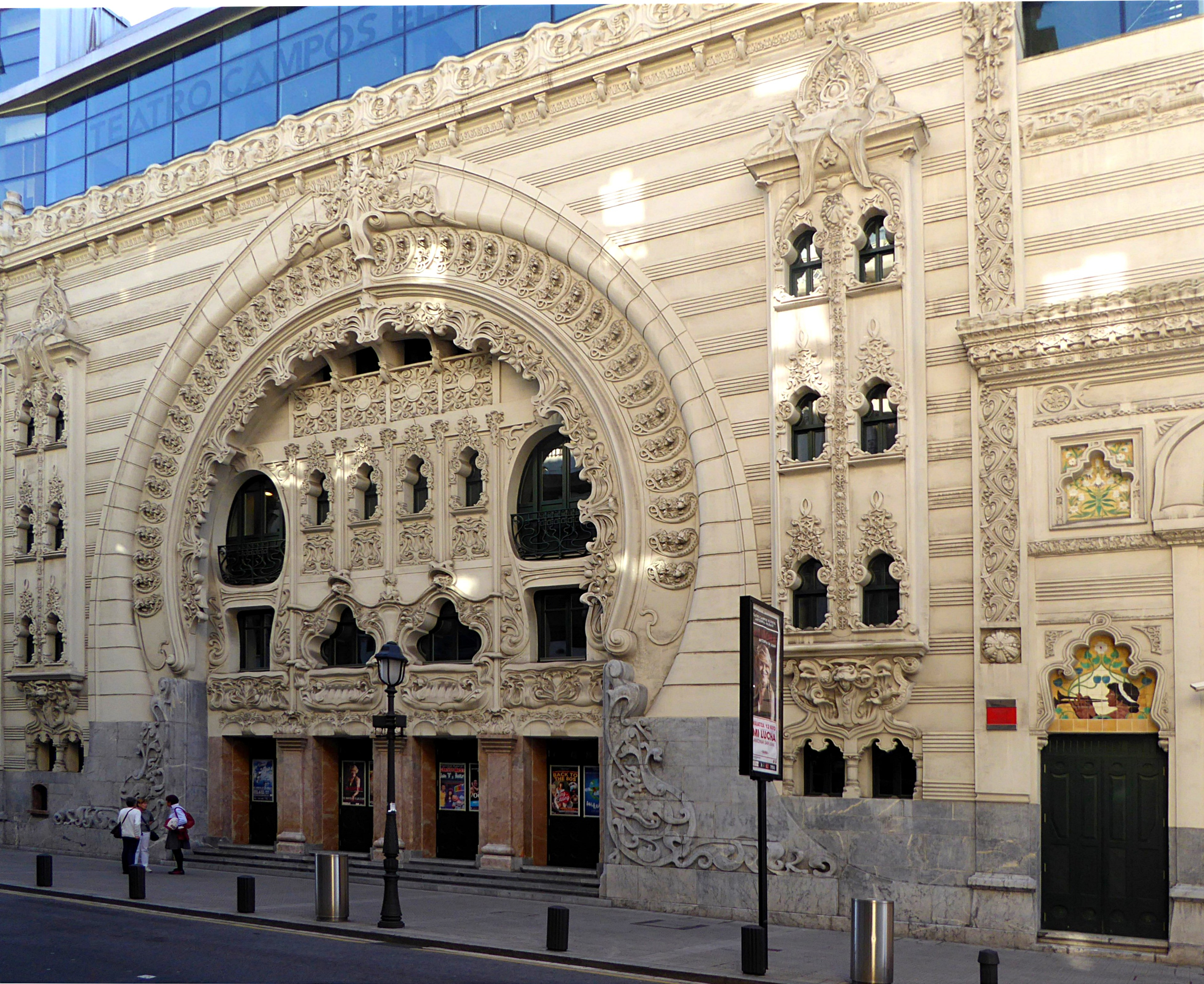
Campos Elíseos Theatre, where the Bilbao Festival of Theatre Schools takes place annually.

The "Ánima Youth Theatre" (AYT) or the "Ánima Young Theatre Productions" is a theatrical project, promoted by the school, which aims to promote theatrical productions with young professional actors from the school. The project (and the crew) is made up of young professional actors and actresses between the ages of 18 and 25.

These projects are staged in different theaters and are also presented to different theater festivals such as the FETABI international festival, the Bilbao Festival of Theatre Schools, the university theatre festival that takes place annually in Bilbao (Spain), organized by the SGAE and the SGAE Foundation.

In addition, "Ánima Youth Theatre" theatrical productions are often taken on tour throughout Spain and sometimes Europe.

They also participate in different international festivals, such as the "International Festival of Young Theater of Trieste" that takes place in Trieste, Italy (Festival Internazionale di Teatro di Trieste), or the "Moscow Your Chance Festival" and the "Moscow Theatre Festival" that takes place in Moscow (Russia).

It also participates in international theater meetings and festivals, such as the Meeting of European Theatre Academies in Florence (Italy) and other international Meetings of Theatre Schools (Poland, Russia, Moldova, Romania, ...).

== Notable alumni ==
- Aitor Luna – (Gran Reserva, Las aventuras del capitán Alatriste, Cathedral of the Sea)
- Xabi Ortuzar – (Money Heist, The Time in Between, El secreto de Puente Viejo, Hospital Central, El pueblo)
- Richard Sahagún – (El ministerio del tiempo, Patria)
- Carmen Climent – (Cuéntame cómo pasó)
- Nerea Elizalde – (Si fueras tú, Go!azen)
- Koldo Olabarri – (Goenkale, Centro Médico, Vamos Juan, El Ministerio del Tiempo)
- Julen Jiménez – (Twin Murders: The Silence of the White City, La línea invisible, Altsasu)
- Ander Barinaga-Rementeria – (Goenkale)
- Julen Guerrero Calvo – (actor, stage director)
- Erika Rodríguez – (actress, theatrologist, scenographer)
- Andrea Monrocle – (actress, visual artist)
- Olga Arlauskas – (film director)
- Nahikari Rodríguez – (actress)
- Ane Pikaza – (Goenkale, Alardea)
- Ainhoa Artetxe – (Hondar Ahoak, Maixabel)
- Yannick Vergara – (Goenkale, Vaya Semanita, Qué vida más triste)
- Yeray Vázquez – (Goenkale)
- Estela Celdrán – (stage director)
- Ander Rovira – (Irabazi Arte, Ene!Flix, El instante decisivo, Generación Anti Todo)
- Lorea Lyons – (actress, filmmaker)
- Ane Inés Landeta – (filmmaker)
- Eriz Cerezo – (actor, director, producer, journalist)
- Jon Azkueta Castro – (novelist, actor, screenwriter)
- Josu Iriarte – (Undercover)
- Egoitz Lucena – (Undercover)
- Miren Galán – (actress, journalist, presenter)

== Awards ==
- Ercilla Award (2010), for the founder Marina Shimanskaya
- Buero Vallejo Award (2011), for Shadows of Forgotten Ancestors (dir. David Valdelvira)
- Buero Vallejo Award (2013), for An ordinary day at the Moulin Rouge (dir. David Valdelvira)
- Buero Vallejo Award (2015), for A Midsummer Night's Dream (dir. David Valdelvira)
- Buero Vallejo Award (2017), for Our dear Mary Poppins (dir. David Valdelvira)
- FETABI Award (2017), for Hamlet (dir. David Valdelvira)

== Filmography ==
- Ánima Eskola Bilbao: documentary film, 2015, dir. Lobke van Eijk

== See also ==
- RESAD
- BAI Performing Arts Training Center
- Royal Academy of Dramatic Art
- Rose Bruford College
