= Miren Galán =

Basque actress, journalist and presenter

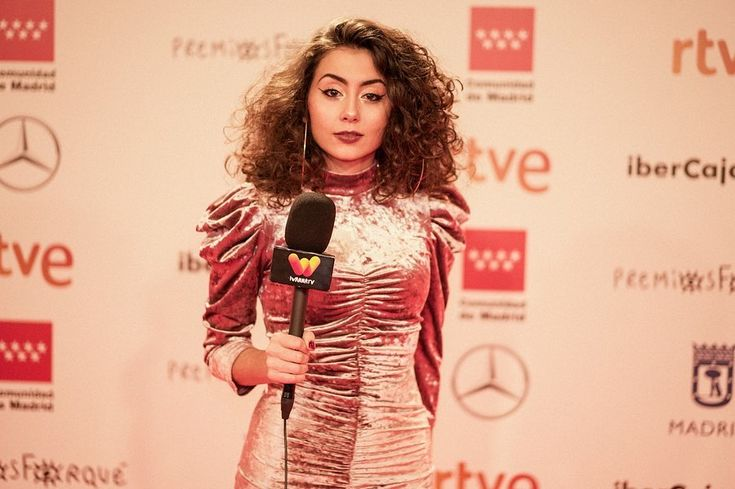
- Galán in 2023
- Born: Miren Karmele Galán Marín; 22 April 1996 (age 30); Santurtzi (Basque Country); Spain
- Education: Asti Leku Ikastola; Ánima Eskola School of Drama; University of the Basque Country
- Occupations: Actress, journalist and presenter.
- Years active: 2009-present
- Awards: Buero Vallejo Award (2013, 2015)

Miren Karmele Galán Marín (born in Santurtzi on 22 April 1996) is a Basque actress, journalist and presenter.

== Life and career ==
Miren Galán was born in Santurtzi (Basque Country) on 22 April 1996. She attended the Asti Leku Ikastola school in Portugalete, where she studied the Spanish Baccalaureate. She later studied a bachelor's degree in audiovisual communication at the University of the Basque Country. She studied and trained in theatre and drama in Ánima Eskola School of Drama with David Valdelvira and Marina Shimanskaya. There he coincided with the also actors Koldo Olabarri, Ainhoa Artetxe, Julen Guerrero and Ane Inés Landeta, together with whom he was trained.

Galán began in the world of theatre with the Teatro Encrucijada theatre company in Santurtzi. In 2009 she participated in the production The king of merengue (El rey del merengue), by the Teatro Encrucijada company, an original musical theatre with a libretto by Rafa Romero and Sergio Morales, directed by Spanish stage director Fernando Valgañón and staged in different theatres throughout Spain such as the Serantes Kultur Aretoa in Santurtzi, the Arriaga Theatre in Bilbao or the Zaragoza Congress Palace in Zaragoza.

In 2012 she took part in the production An ordinary day at the Moulin Rouge, a musical comedy written and directed by Spanish stage director David Valdelvira and staged at the Campos Elíseos Theatre, along with Koldo Olabarri and Ainhoa Artetxe among other members of the cast. The production was very well received and was taken to different theaters in 2012 and 2013. The stage production was awarded the Buero Vallejo Award (2013), in the 10th edition of the awards.

In 2013 she performed the play The Lower Depths by Maxim Gorky, a production at the Campos Elíseos Theatre, directed by Spanish stage director David Valdelvira, together with Julen Guerrero and Ane Inés Landeta, among other cast members.

In 2014 she took part in the play A Midsummer Night's Dream by William Shakespeare, playing the role of Nick Bottom, a theatrical production at the Campos Elíseos Theatre, directed by Spanish stage director David Valdelvira, and with Estela Celdrán as an assistant director, together with Carmen Climent, Nerea Elizalde, Julen Guerrero, Lorea Lyons and Ane Inés Landeta, among other cast members. The theatrical production was very well received by the public, and was staged several times between 2014 and 2015. The stage production was awarded the Buero Vallejo Award (2015), in the XII edition of the awards.

In 2015, she performed the play Impossible Dialogues, a theatrical production at the Campos Elíseos Theatre, directed by Russian actress and stage director Marina Shimanskaya, based on the works The Seagull, The Cherry Orchard and Three Sisters by Anton Chekhov and on the poetry of Gustavo Adolfo Bécquer, together with Carmen Climent, Nerea Elizalde, Lorea Lyons and Ane Inés Landeta, among other cast members.

In 2020, she was the presenter of the GetxoExpress Film Festival, a film festival held annually in the town of Getxo (Basque Country). She currently works in the field of audiovisual production.

== Filmography ==
=== Stage ===
- 2015, Impossible Dialogues, dir. Marina Shimanskaya
- 2014, A Midsummer Night's Dream, dir. David Valdelvira
- 2013, The Lower Depths, dir. David Valdelvira
- 2012, An ordinary day at the Moulin Rouge, dir. David Valdelvira
- 2009–2010, The king of merengue, dir. Fernando Valgañón (libretto by Rafa Romero and Sergio Morales)

=== Other ===
- 2020, Host/Presenter, GetxoExpress Film Festival

== Awards and nominations ==
=== Buero Vallejo Awards ===
Year	Category	For work	Result	Ref.
2015	Best theatrical/stage production	A Midsummer Night's Dream	Won	
2013	Best theatrical/stage production	An ordinary day at the Moulin Rouge	Won	

== See also ==
- Koldo Olabarri
- Ainhoa Artetxe
- Julen Guerrero
