= Ainhoa Artetxe =

Spanish film, stage and television actress

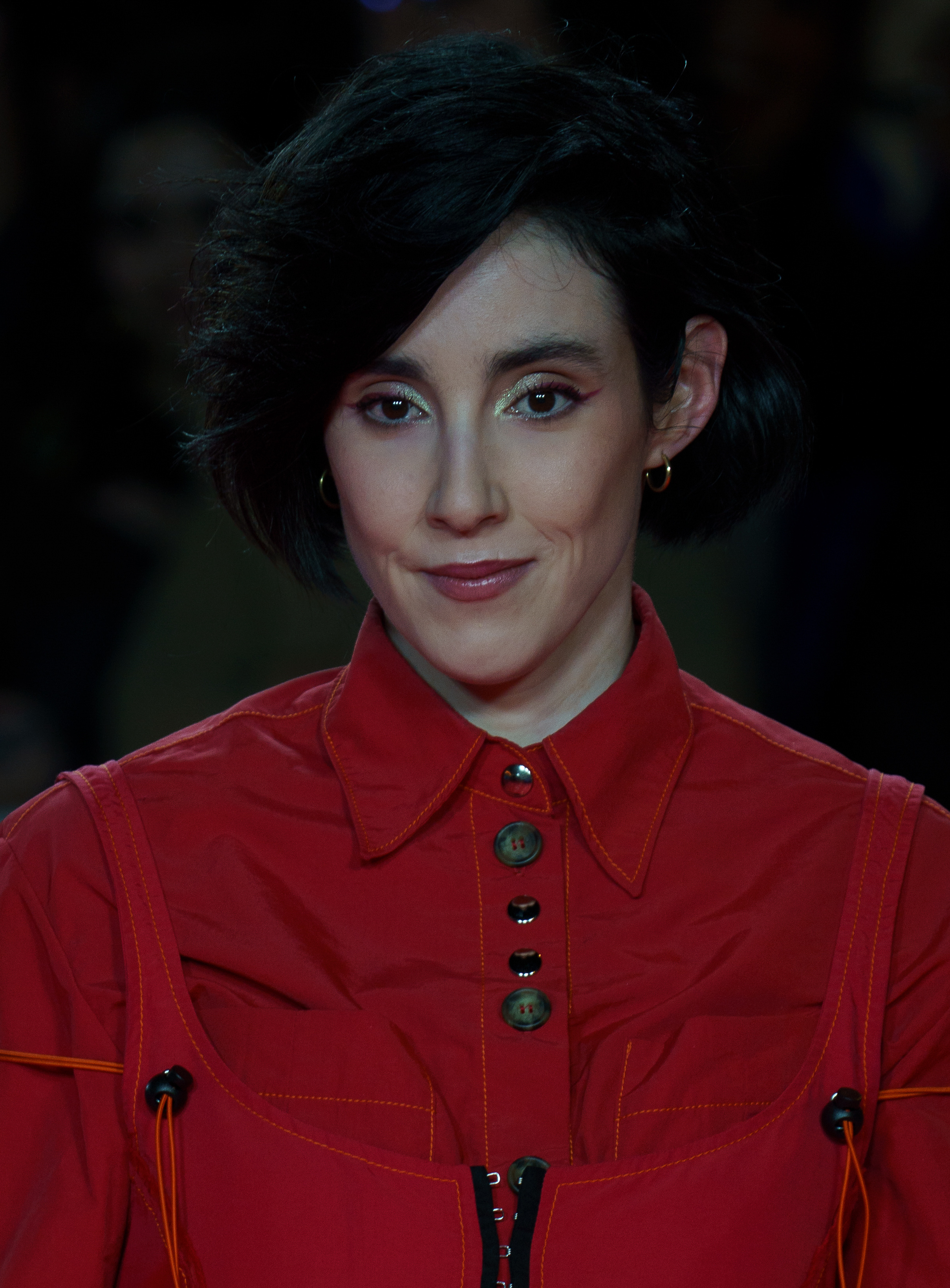
- Artetxe in 2025
- Born: Ainhoa Artetxe Uriarte; 16 July 1993 (age 33); Bilbao, Spain
- Citizenship: Spain
- Education: Ánima Eskola School of Drama; University of the Basque Country
- Occupation: actress
- Years active: 2010-present
- Notable work: Hondar Ahoak
- Awards: Buero Vallejo Award (2013)

Ainhoa Artetxe Uriarte (born 16 July 1993) is a Spanish film, theatre and television actress.

== Life and career ==
Artetxe was born in Bilbao. She studied and trained in theatre, drama and acting at the Ánima Eskola School of Drama with David Valdelvira, Marina Shimanskaya and Algis Arlauskas, training as a method actor, under the Stanislavsky-Vakhtangov-M.Chekhov-Meyerhold methodology (Russian method), following the methodologies of the Russian classical school. There she coincided with actor Koldo Olabarri, with whom she studied. Later she moved to Madrid to train in dramatic art with the Argentine stage director and theatre professor Juan Carlos Corazza.

In 2011 she performed the play Isn't it true that we will be forever?, a theatrical production at the Campos Elíseos Theatre, directed by Russian stage director Marina Shimanskaya, with Koldo Olabarri among other members of the cast.

In 2012 she participated in the production An ordinary day at the Moulin Rouge, a musical comedy written and directed by Spanish stage director David Valdelvira and staged at the Campos Elíseos Theatre, along with Koldo Olabarri among other members of the cast. The production was very well received and was taken to different theatres in 2012 and 2013. The stage production was awarded the Buero Vallejo Award (2013), in the 10th edition of the awards. She was part of the Ánima Youth Theatre.

In 2016 she participated in the play The Language of Love and in 2017 in The Great Market, both directed by the Argentine director Juan Carlos Corazza. During the years 2018 and 2021 she was part of the cast of Mari eta gaileta fabrika, directed by theatre director Olatz Gorrotxategi.

In 2016 she joined the young theatre company of Pabellón 6 in Bilbao, with which she staged the play Romeo and Juliet directed by Ramón Barea, with Koldo Olabarri and Nerea Elizalde also among the cast. Also with the young theatre company of Pabellón 6, she staged the play ¿Qué fue de Ana García?, directed by Borja Ruiz, during the years 2018 and 2021.

In 2020 she co-starred in the miniseries Hondar Ahoak (sand mouths), a thriller set on the Basque coast, a Basque 'noir', along with Eneko Sagardoy and Nagore Aranburu. The miniseries was widely received and acclaimed by critics and in 2021 it became a success when it was broadcast in streaming. In 2021 the series received the Argia Award in the audiovisual category. Co-star Nagore Aranburu was also nominated for best television actress at the Union of Basque Actors and Actresses Awards for the series.

Also in 2020 she was part of the cast of the series Patria, from HBO Spain, and La Línea Invisible, from Movistar+.

In cinema, Artetxe has worked on several short and feature films, such as large productions such as Nora by Lara Izagirre in 2020 or Maixabel by Icíar Bollaín in 2021.

== Filmography ==
=== Film ===
- 2021, Maixabel, dir. Icíar Bollaín
- 2020, Nora, dir. Lara Izagirre
- 2019, Jone a veces, dir. Sara Fantova
- 2019, Gordeleku, dir. Ferran Ureña
- 2018, El color de las luces, dir. Jonas Alván
- 2018, Margadalena y Lilith, dir. Julio Vargas Buendía
- 2017, No me despertéis, dir. Sara Fantova
- 2017, Final de champions, dir. David Sañudo
- 2015, En el baño, dir. Sara Fantova y Lola Mariscal
- 2014, Historia de un sueño, dir. Berta Espina
- 2012, Lluvia

=== Television ===
- 2020, Patria, HBO Spain
- 2020, La línea invisible, Movistar+
- 2020, Hondar ahoak, ETB 1
- 2013, Goenkale, ETB 1

=== Stage ===
- 2021-2022, Winona y Grace, dir. Alex Gerediaga
- 2021, Tratando de hacer una obra que cambie el mundo, dir. Javier Liñera
- 2021, La maniobra Heimlich o vomitando a los años 80, dir. Pako Revueltas
- 2018-2021, ¿Qué fue de Ana García?, dir. Borja Ruiz
- 2018-2021, Mari eta gaileta fabrika, dir. Olatz Gorrotxategi
- 2018, Ser o no ser influencer, dir. Casimiro Aguza
- 2017, El gran mercado, dir. Juan Carlos Corazza
- 2016, El lenguaje del amor, dir. Juan Carlos Corazza
- 2016, Desconocidos, dir. David Sañudo
- 2016, On the air, dir. Graeme Miller
- 2016-2017, Romeo y Julieta, dir. Ramón Barea
- 2012, Va de cine, dir. Itziar Lazkano, Maitane Zalduegi y Gurutze Beitia (Bilbaoeszena)
- 2012, An ordinary day at the Moulin Rouge, dir. David Valdelvira (Buero Vallejo Award 2013)
- 2011, Isn't it true that we will be forever?, dir. Marina Shimanskaya

== Awards and nominations ==
=== Buero Vallejo Awards ===
Year	Category	For work	Result
2013	Best theatrical/stage production	An ordinary day at the Moulin Rouge	Won
