= Nahikari Rodríguez =

Spanish actress

- Born: Nahikari Rodríguez Martínez; 13 January 1993 (age 33); Portugalete, Spain
- Education: Asti Leku Ikastola; University of Deusto (BA); Ánima Eskola School of Drama (BA)
- Occupation: actress
- Years active: 2011-present

Nahikari Rodríguez Martínez (born 13 January 1993) is a Spanish film, theater and television actress.

== Life and career ==
Nahikari Rodríguez was born in Portugalete (Biscay, Basque Country) in 1993. She attended Asti Leku Ikastola. She studied the Bachelor's Degree in modern languages at the University of Deusto (2011-2015), with the thesis "Behind words: A speech act approach to Shakespeare's subtext in Macbeth".

She later studied, trained and graduated in theater, drama and acting (BA) in Ánima Eskola School of Drama with David Valdelvira, Marina Shimanskaya and Algis Arlauskas, training as a method actor, under the Stanislavsky-Vakhtangov-M.Chekhov-Meyerhold methodology (Russian method), following the methodologies of the Russian classical school. She also trained in film acting with Richard Sahagún and in film acting with Eduardo Casanova.

In the years 2013–2014, she participated in the theater production Bodas de Sangre, directed by Marina Shimanskaya, playing the role of La Novia. The work was represented in different theaters, among them in the auditorium of the Montel del Prao in Jaulín, a natural amphitheater in Jaulín (Aragón).

She was part of the young theater company of Hall 6 of Bilbao. He has been part of different theatrical productions carried out in different parts of Spain, such as Los Aborigenes, together with María Cerezuela, Galerna, directed by Ramón Barea and premiered at the Teatro Arriaga, or El Trepa de Palacio, together with the actor Diego Pérez.

In 2022, she starred in the film Ahora que me voy, along with the actors Adrià Escudero, Ramon Barea, Itziar Lazkano and María Cerezuela. The film was produced by the Basque Country Film School and presented at the Santurce International Film Festival.

== Private life ==
She is the sister of the dancer and choreographer Lohitzune Rodríguez.

== Filmography ==
=== Television ===
- 2018, Ur Handitan, ETB 1
- 2015, Kantugiro, ETB 1

=== Film ===
- 2021, Ahora que me voy, dir. Nahikari Rodríguez
- 2020, Muere un bañista, dir. Iñigo Cobo
- 2016, Solo quería contar una historia, dir. Aritzeder Arregi
- 2016, Apocalipsis G
- 2016, Res, dir. Josu Angulo
- 2016, Por un Puñado de Juegos, dir. Estibaliz Hierrezuelo

=== Stage ===
- 2022, El Trepa de Palacio, dir. Felipe Loza
- 2022, Piztu emakumeON energia
- 2018–2021, Mi Último Baile, dir. Getari Etxegarai
- 2019, Galerna, dir. Ramón Barea
- 2017–2019, Los Aborígenes (Lorca, Dalí y Buñuel), dir. Felipe Loza
- 2013–2014, Bodas de Sangre, dir. Marina Shimanskaya
- 2011, El salto y las voces, dir. Marina Shimanskaya
