= Maria Cruickshank =

Spanish actress (born 1989)

- Cruickshank in 2014
- Born: Maria Cruickshank Moreno; 12 November 1989 (age 36); Oñati, Gipuzkoa, Spain
- Education: BAI Performing Arts Training Center
- Occupation: Actress
- Years active: 2008–present
- Children: 3

Maria Cruickshank Moreno (born 12 November 1989) is a Spanish actress best known for her work in Basque-language film and television.

== Biography ==
Cruickshank was born in Oñati to a Grenadian father and a Basque mother. She began acting at the age of 16 after enrolling in a drama school in Vitoria-Gasteiz. She completed her Spanish Baccalaureate in Mondragón, and studied fine arts and theater at Artebi Antzerki Eskola and the BAI Performing Arts Training Center in Bilbao.

Cruickshank made her television debut as a child on the Basque children's series Betimu. While a student, she was cast as Itxaso in the Basque television series Goenkale, a role she played for seven years.

=== Personal life ===
Cruickshank became a mother in 2014; she has three children. In addition to acting, she is also a doula.

== Filmography ==
=== Film ===
Year	Title	Role	Notes	Ref.
2014	Negotiator	Fayna		
2018	Black Is Beltza	Amanda	Voice role	
2022	Black Is Beltza II: Ainhoa	Ainhoa	Voice role	

=== Television ===
Year	Title	Role	Ref.
2008–2015	Goenkale	Itxaso	
2015	Locked Up	Lis	
2020–2021	Go!azen	Kristina	
2024	Detective Touré	TBA	
2025	Mari sorgin ehiztari	Karmele	
