= Erika Rodríguez =

Basque actress, theatrologist and scenographer

Erika Rodríguez Horrillo
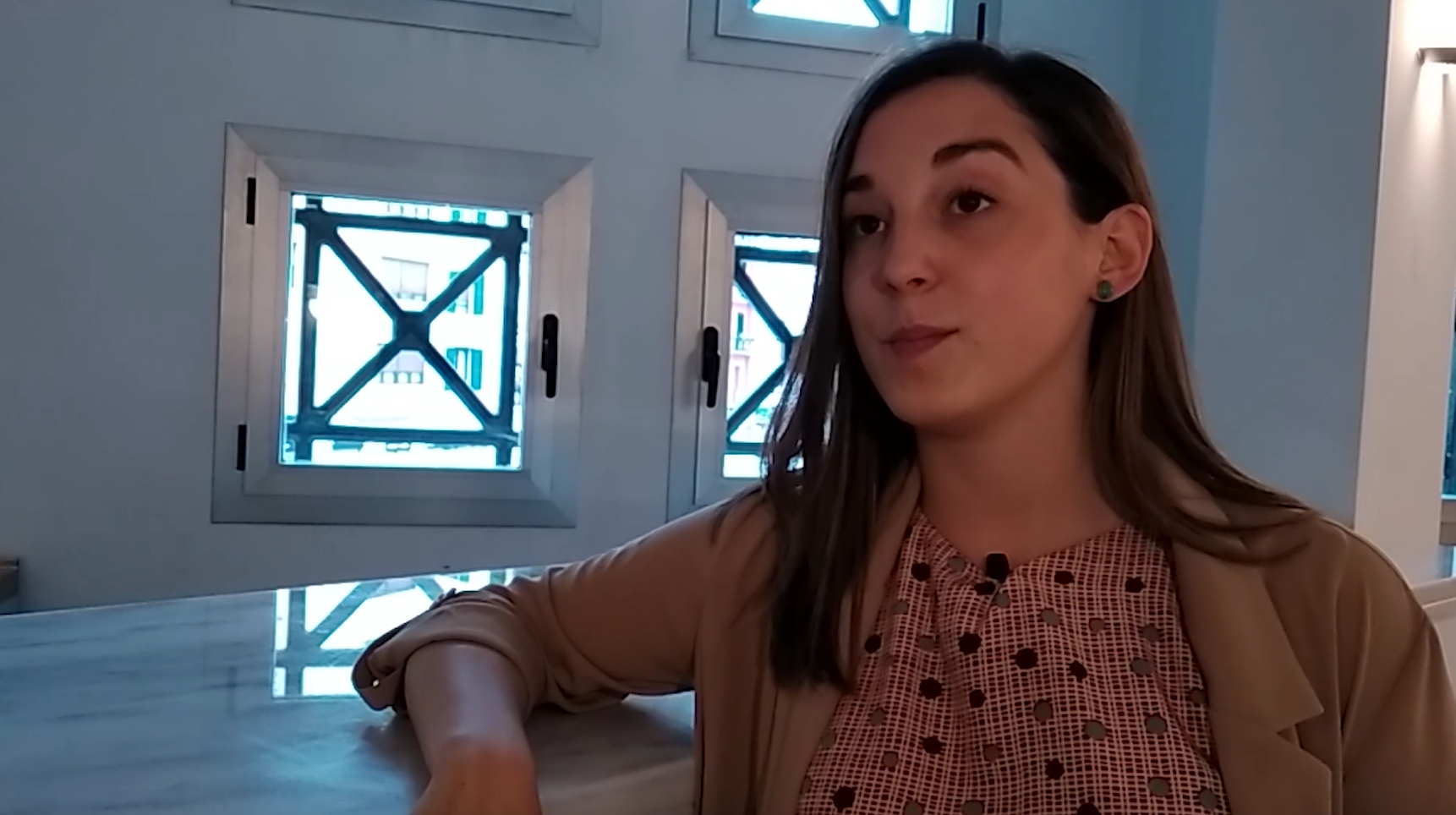
- Erika Rodríguez Horrillo at the 44th Theatre Days of Eibar (Eibar, 2021)
- Born: Erika Rodríguez Horrillo; 19 January 1992 (age 34); Eibar (Basque Country); Spain
- Education: University of Salamanca (BA); Ánima Eskola School of Drama (BD); University of Glasgow (MLitt)
- Occupations: Actress, theatrologist and scenographer
- Years active: 2010–present
- Organization(s): Assembly; Eibar Theatre Festival

Erika Rodríguez Horrillo (born in Eibar on 19 January 1992) is a Basque actress, theatrologist and scenographer.

She is the current deputy director of the Eibar Theatre Festival, an international theatre festival held annually in the city of Eibar.

== Life and career ==
Erika Rodríguez Horrillo was born in Eibar (Basque Country) on 19 January 1992, into a family of Salamanca and Badajoz origin. She studied for a bachelor's degree in English philology and literature at the University of Salamanca. She studied for a degree in theatre and drama at the Ánima Eskola School of Drama with Marina Shimanskaya. She later completed a master of letters (MLitt) in theatre studies at the University of Glasgow. She completed her thesis on the influence of the Scottish stage director Giles Havergal in the Citizens Theatre (Glasgow) and in the Scottish theatre.

Rodríguez began in the Teatro Lunatico theatre company at the University of Salamanca, performing different works directed by Catalina García García-Herreros. She is currently a member of the Narruzko Zezen theatre company of Eibar, a company that has included actors such as Imanol Arias and Iñaki Miramón.

In 2015, she performed the play Impossible Dialogues, a theatrical production at the Campos Elíseos Theatre, directed by Russian actress and stage director Marina Shimanskaya, based on the works The Seagull, The Cherry Orchard and Three Sisters by Anton Chekhov and on the poetry of Gustavo Adolfo Bécquer, together with Carmen Climent, Nerea Elizalde, Lorea Lyons and Ane Inés Landeta, among other cast members.

In 2016, Rodríguez participated as a dramaturg in the celebration of the 400th anniversary of William Shakespeare, coordinated by Anselm Heinrich, in a joint event between the University of Glasgow, the Scottish Symphony Orchestra, the Glasgow School of Art (GSA) and the Royal Conservatoire of Scotland (RCS), to create a stage performance based on works by Shakespeare.

As a member of the Narruzko Zezen theatre company, she has been a dramaturg and scenographer in different theatre productions such as The comedy of Carla and Luisa (2019), Isabelita the sky-watcher (2018) or Lost objects (2016), under the direction of stage directors such as Manolo Murillo or Juan Ortega.

In 2021, she was chosen as host/presenter of the 44th Eibar Theatre Festival, an international theatre festival held annually in the city of Eibar and held at the Coliseo Theatre (Eibar), and in that edition had the presence of well-known artists such as the actress Ane Gabarain or the director Fernando Bernués.

Currently, Rodríguez is the deputy director of the Eibar Theatre Festival. Additionally, she is also part of the Scottish theatre operator Assembly Festival (Edinburgh), as part of its technical team. She has also been programming director at the Lara Theatre (Madrid).

== Filmography ==
=== Stage (as actress) ===
- 2015, Impossible Dialogues, dir. Marina Shimanskaya
- 2012, Eclogue of Plácida and Vitoriano, dir. Catalina García García-Herreros, Teatro Lunático (Plácida)
- 2011, The careless life, dir. Catalina García García-Herreros, Teatro Lunático (Elisa)

=== Stage (as scenographer) ===
- 2019, The comedy of Carla and Luisa, dir. Manolo Murillo and Juan Ortega
- 2018, Isabelita the sky-watcher, dir. Manolo Murillo and Juan Ortega
- 2016, Lost objects, dir. Manolo Murillo

=== Film ===
- 2015, Ánima Eskola Bilbao: documentary, dir. Lobke van Eijk (Student)

=== Other ===
- 2021, Host/Presenter, 44th Eibar Theatre Festival
- 2016, Dramaturg (UoG crew), celebration of the 400th anniversary of William Shakespeare

== Works ==
- Rodríguez Horrillo, Erika (2017). "Giles Havergal: A Theatre for the Citizens". University of Glasgow-Citizens Theatre.

== See also ==
- Marina Shimanskaya
- Imanol Arias
- Eibar
