= Negotiator (2014 film) =

- Theatrical release poster
- Spanish: Negociador
- Directed by: Borja Cobeaga
- Written by: Borja Cobeaga
- Produced by: Nahikari Ipiña; Borja Cobeaga
- Starring: Ramón Barea; Josean Bengoetxea; Carlos Areces; Melina Matthews; Jons Pappila; Santi Ugalde; Gorka Aguinagalde; Maria Cruickshank; Nagore Aranburu; Alejandro Tejería; Secun de la Rosa; Raúl Arévalo; Óscar Ladoire
- Cinematography: Jon D. Domínguez
- Edited by: Carolina Martínez
- Music by: Aránzazu Calleja
- Production company: Sayaka Producciones
- Distributed by: Avalon
- Release dates: September 2014 (Zinemaldia); 13 March 2015 (Spain)
- Country: Spain
- Language: Spanish

Negotiator (Spanish: Negociador) is a 2014 Spanish film written and directed by Borja Cobeaga which stars Ramón Barea.

== Plot ==
The plot follows the plight of Basque politician Manu Aranguren, the contact person in the negotiations between ETA and the Spanish government.

== Cast ==
- Ramón Barea as Manu Aranguren
- Josean Bengoetxea as Jokin
- Melina Matthews as Sophie
- Jöns Pappila as James
- Carlos Areces as Patxi
- Maria Cruickshank as Fayna
- Óscar Ladoire as Alberto
- Raúl Arévalo as Rafa
- Secun de la Rosa
- Gorka Aguinagalde
- Santi Ugalde
- Alejandro Tejería
- Nagore Aranburu

== Production ==
The film was produced by Sayaka Producciones, and it had the participation of ETB, the Basque Government, and Canal+. Shooting locations included San Sebastián.

== Release ==
Negotiator was presented in the 'Zabaltegi' section of the 62nd San Sebastián Film Festival in September 2014. Distributed by Avalon, it was released theatrically in Spain on 13 March 2015.

== Reception ==
Neil Young of The Hollywood Reporter considered Negotiator a "briskly amusing" film, otherwise writing that "droll peek behind political headlines is elevated by strong, engaging performances".

Ricardo Aldarondo of Fotogramas rated the film 4 out of 5 stars, writing about the film's "bravery and insight".

Andrea G. Bermejo of Cinemanía rated the film 4 out of 5 stars, deeming it to be Cobeaga's "least 'funny' comedy but his most brilliant film" in the verdict.

Javier Ocaña of El País billed the film as "a historic film for our cinema and for our society" [...] pursuing "a painful, black, brilliant, tragic and atrocious humor, about the deformation of language, about the miseries of the recent history of the Basque Country, about the miseries of the human race".

== Accolades ==
Year	Award	Category	Nominee(s)	Result	Ref.
2014	62nd San Sebastián International Film Festival	Irizar Basque Film Award		Won	
2016	3rd Feroz Awards	Best Comedy Film		Won	
2016	3rd Feroz Awards	Best Screenplay	Borja Cobeaga	Nominated	
2016	3rd Feroz Awards	Best Main Actor in a Film	Ramón Barea	Nominated	
2016	3rd Feroz Awards	Best Film Poster	Iñaki Villuendas, Jorge Alvariño	Nominated	
2016	30th Goya Awards	Best Original Screenplay	Borja Cobeaga	Nominated	

== See also ==
- List of Spanish films of 2015
