= Summer in Red =

- Film poster
- Spanish: Verano en rojo
- Directed by: Belén Macías
- Screenplay by: Belén Macías; Helio Mira
- Based on: Verano en rojo by Berna González Harbour
- Produced by: Gerardo Herrero
- Starring: Marta Nieto; José Coronado; Luis Callejo; Richard Sahagún; Francesco Carril; Marc Martínez; Zoé Arnao; Ramón Agirre; Javier Godino
- Cinematography: Gabo Querra
- Edited by: Alejandro Lázaro
- Music by: Paula Olaz
- Production companies: Verano en rojo AIE; Tornasol Media
- Distributed by: DeAPlaneta
- Release date: 8 September 2023
- Country: Spain
- Language: Spanish

Summer in Red (Spanish: Verano en rojo) is a 2023 Spanish thriller film directed by Belén Macías based on the novel by Berna González Harbour which stars Marta Nieto and José Coronado.

== Plot ==
Set in the Summer of 2010 in between Madrid and Navarre, against the backdrop of the attention paid in Spain to the 2010 FIFA World Cup and the occurrence of sexual abuse (paederasty) cases within the Catholic Church, the plot follows the plight of police inspector María Ruiz upon facing a difficult murder case, for which she will be assisted by veteran journalist Luna.

== Cast ==
- Marta Nieto as María Ruiz
- José Coronado as Luna
- Luis Callejo
- Richard Sahagún
- Francesco Carril
- Marc Martínez
- Zoé Arnao
- Ramón Agirre
- Tomás del Estal

== Production ==
A film adaptation of the novel Verano en rojo by Berna González Harbour, the screenplay was penned by Belén Macías and Helio Mira. The film was produced by Verano en rojo AIE and Tornasol Media, with the participation of RTVE, and Movistar Plus+, and backing from ICAA. Shooting locations included Madrid and Pamplona.

== Release ==
Distributed by DeAPlaneta, the film will be released theatrically in Spain on 8 September 2023.

== Reception ==
Raquel Hernández Luján of HobbyConsolas scored the film with 70 points ('good'), highlighting the cast, Macía's camera moves, and the "powerful" social denouncement as positive points while citing how the film adheres to [already] known formulas as a negative point.

Jordi Batlle Caminal of Fotogramas rated the film 3 out of 5 stars, deeming it to be just as effective in its denunciation as Spotlight but less boring.

Javier Ocaña of Cinemanía rated the film 3 out of 5 stars welcoming the first frontal take on the issue in Spain since Bad Education, otherwise highlighting "the reflection on adolescent loneliness, on which these vermin feed", as the best part about the film.

Manuel J. Lombardo of Diario de Sevilla rated the film with a single star, assessing that neither the police thriller nor the journalistic investigation approaches actually work in the film.

== See also ==
- List of Spanish films of 2023
