= Salleko Dance Group =

Association of Basque dance

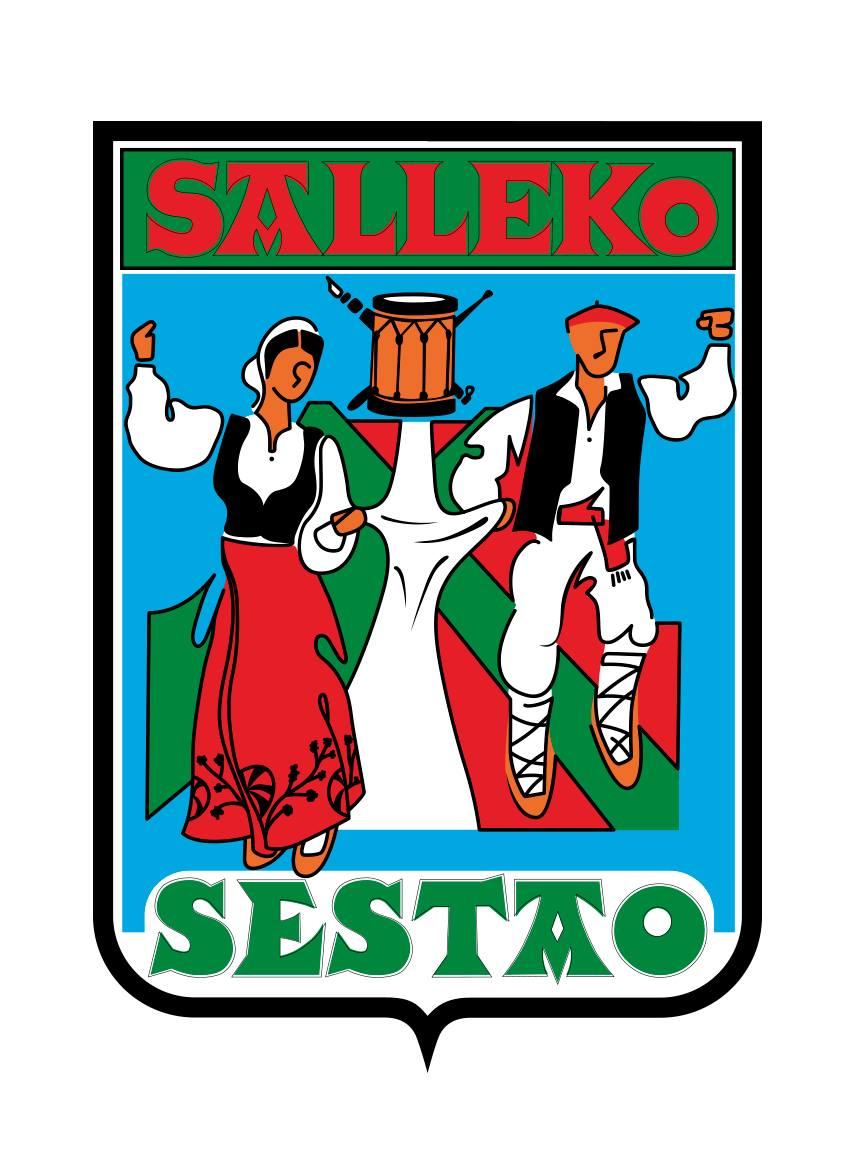
- Established: 1962; 64 years ago
- Purpose: institutionalization and promotion of Basque dance
- Location(s): Sestao, Biscay; Basque Country; Spain
- Official language: Spanish, Basque

The Salleko Dance Group (in Basque, Salleko Dantza Taldea; in Spanish, Grupo de Danzas Salleko) is a Basque cultural association founded in 1962, whose objective is the institutionalization and promotion of Basque dance, a relevant aspect of Basque culture.

== History ==
=== Establishment ===
The Basque dance and music group was founded in 1962 by Brother Basilio, of the De La Salle Brothers, as a school group. The Salleko Basque dance group directed its work from the beginning of research, learning, teaching and dissemination of Basque dance and Basque folklore.

=== 1970s - 2000 ===
One of the main members of the group was Fernando Irasuegui, a txistu teacher and member of the Sestao Municipal Music Band. In its beginnings, during the 1970s and 1980s, the dance group had to make a selection of dancers (dantzaris), because many people wanted to be part of the group.

Due to its growth, in 1988 it was legally constituted as a cultural association to institutionalize itself as a cultural organization and continue with the work it had carried out up to that moment. Since its creation, the dance group has performed in almost every municipality and every province throughout Spain. In addition, they have also performed in other countries such as France or Italy.

The name "Salleko" means "of La Salle" in Basque (Salle-ko). The name comes from the creation of the group by Brother Basilio at the La Salle Brothers College in Sestao, group of "la Salle", Salleko.

=== 2000 - present ===
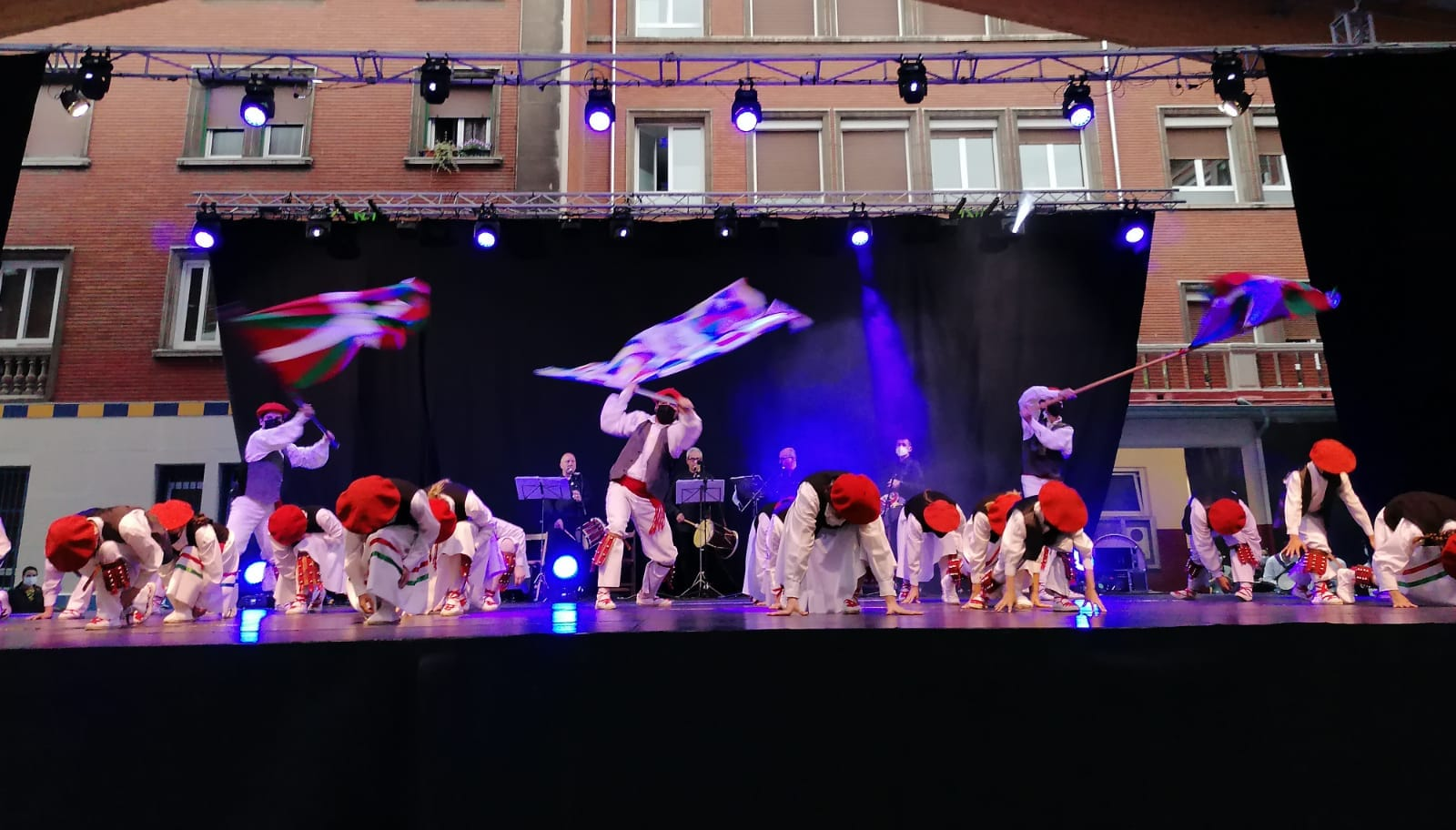
Salleko Dance Group in 2021.

The group is based in a facility ceded by the private Catholic school Colegio Begoñako Andra Mari-La Salle in the municipality of Sestao (a school that emerged in 2001 from the merger of the contiguous schools Colegio Hermanos de La Salle, for boys, and Colegio Hijas de la Cruz, for girls).

The dance group is formed in Basque dances and in the different provincial modalities of Basque dances (zazpi jauzi, arin-arin, aurresku,...). In addition, the Salleko dance group organizes annual events such as the Folklore Show, the Umeen Euskal Jaia, dance workshops, pilgrimages and others. Within the annual organization of the Folklore Show, groups from all over the world are also invited to Spain. He has also participated in the Dantzari Eguna (day of the dancer, in Basque) since its inception, or in the Bizkaiko Dantzari Eguna, which Salleko hosted in 1989 and in 2019.

In 2012, the Salleko dance group celebrated its 50th anniversary with various events in Sestao and also some events at the Barakaldo Theatre. For the 50th anniversary, former dancers (dantzaris) also met to whom a tribute was paid.

== See also ==
- Basque dance
