= Denis Martínez Roque =

Cuban dancer and choreographer

Denis Martínez
- Born: Denis Martínez Roque; 1990 (age 35–36); Camagüey, Cuba
- Education: Professional Dance School of Cuba
- Occupations: Dancer, choreographer
- Years active: 2000 -
- Organization: Danza Contemporanea de Cuba
- Known for: Dance

Denis Martínez Roque (born 1990, Camagüey, Cuba) is a Cuban dancer and choreographer. He was the first dancer and choreographer of the National Dance Company of Cuba.

== Life and career ==
He was born in Camagüey (Cuba) in 1990. He began receiving dance classes at the age of 10. She graduated from the Professional Dance School of Cuba. He began his career in the Endedans Contemporary Ballet of Cuba, a company in which he was a dancer and later a choreographer. As a choreographer, he created different works for the company, with the support of the Performing Arts and the Ministry of Culture of Cuba, receiving numerous mentions and awards.

In 2009 he became part of the National Dance Company of Cuba. As a member of the company, he toured internationally, with performances in different countries, such as the Opera House (Rome), the Maison de la danse (Lyon), the Sadler's Wells Theatre (London), the Teatro Real (Madrid), the Mercado de las Flores (Barcelona) or the National Auditorium (Mexico City). In 2013 he became principal dancer and choreographer of the National Dance Company of Cuba, under the direction of the Artistic Council of the National Company and the Ministry of Culture of Cuba.

In 2014 he moved to Switzerland as a member of the Swiss Royal Circus, as the first soloist dancer. At the end of 2014 he moved to Spain. Since 2014 he lives and resides in Bilbao (Spain).

He has worked as a dancer and choreographer in different Spanish dance performances.

== Works ==
- Together we are Broadway, 2021
- Allegro Ma Non Troppo (musical show), 2021
- 365, 2022
