= Black Is Beltza II: Ainhoa =

- Film poster
- Directed by: Fermín Muguruza
- Screenplay by: Fermín Muguruza; Harkaitz Cano; Isa Campo
- Starring: Maria Cruickshank; Itziar Ituño; Manex Fuchs; Antonio de la Torre; Ariadna Gil; Darko Peric; Eneko Sagardoy
- Music by: Maite Arroitajauregi
- Production companies: BIB2 Ainhoa AIE; Talka Records; Draftoon; Lagarto
- Distributed by: Barton Films (Spain)
- Release dates: 23 September 2022 (Zinemaldia); 30 September 2022 (Spain); 20 October 2022 (Argentina)
- Running time: 86 minutes
- Countries: Spain; Argentina
- Languages: Arabic; Basque; English; French; Spanish

Black Is Beltza II: Ainhoa is a 2022 adult animated drama film directed by Fermín Muguruza from a screenplay by Muguruza, Isa Campo, and Harkaitz Cano. It is a follow-up to 2018 film Black Is Beltza.

== Plot ==
Set in the mid-1980s, against the backdrop of Cold War's last rales, the plot follows the plight of Bolivia-born and Cuba-raised Ainhoa in her journeys across the Basque Country (her father's homeland), Lebanon, Afghanistan, and Marseille.

== Voice cast ==
- Maria Cruickshank as Ainhoa
- Itziar Ituño
- Antonio de la Torre
- Ariadna Gil
- Eneko Sagardoy
- Miren Gaztañaga
- Manex Fuchs
- Darko Perić
- Gorka Otxoa

== Production ==
The films if an BIB2 Ainhoa AIE, Talka Records, Draftoon, and Lagarto production. It had the participation of Basque Autonomous Community's EiTB and the support of Argentina's INCAA. A Spanish-Argentine co-production, it received however no support from Spain's ICAA nor RTVE.

== Release ==
The film was presented at the 70th San Sebastián International Film Festival on 23 September 2023. It was released theatrically in Spain on 30 September 2022.

== Reception ==
Juan Pablo Cinelli of Página/12 considered that, limitations of the animation work notwithstanding, the film is "sufficiently expressive" so it can effectively fulfill its didactic purpose: "to give an account of the revolutionary causes active during the '80s".

== Accolades ==
| Year | Award | Category | Nominee(s) | Result | Ref. |
|---|---|---|---|---|---|
| 2023 | 37th Goya Awards | Best Animated Film | | Nominated | |
