= Fernando Valgañón =

Spanish actor, teacher and theatre director

- Born: Fernando Valgañón Esnal; 1966; Sestao, Spain
- Died: 19 April 2018 (aged 51–52); Barakaldo, Spain
- Other name: Fernan
- Education: Asti Leku College; University of the Basque Country (BA, BA); Basauri Theatre School (BA)
- Occupations: Actor, teacher, drama teacher, theatre director
- Employer(s): Asti Leku College; Ánima Eskola School of Drama; University of the Basque Country
- Organization: Basque Actors Union

Fernando Valgañón Esnal (1966–2018) was a Spanish actor, teacher and theatre director.

== Life and career ==
Fernando Valgañón was born in Sestao, Spain. He studied at Asti Leku College. When he was young he was a member (as a dancer) of the Salleko Dance Group of Sestao.

He graduated in hispanic philology from the University of the Basque Country. He graduated in drama from the Basauri Theatre School. Later he got a licenciate degree in audiovisual communication in the University of the Basque Country and a bachelor's in business also in the University of the Basque Country.

As an actor, he acted in films such as Menos que cero (1996) and Suerte (1997). He taught acting, directing, and production at theater and film schools such as Artebi, Ánima Eskola School of Drama, the Basauri Theatre School, and others. He collaborated with the postgraduate course in theater at the University of the Basque Country. He was also a teacher of Spanish language and literature and theater at Asti Leku College.

He was a member and creator of the direction and production company Txamuskina Teatro. Valgañón was a member of the Basque actors and actresses union "Euskal Aktoreen Batasuna" (Basque Actors Union). He was elected General Secretary of the union.

== Filmography ==
=== Films ===
- Less Than Zero (1996)
- Luck (1997)

=== Theatre ===
- Out of my mind (1997)
- Once upon a time (1999)
- Mohican Theater (2000)
- Boxes (2002)
- The King of Merengue (2009)
