= Tessa Andonegi =

Spanish actress and television presenter (born 1968)

- Andonegi in 2022
- Born: Teresa Andonegi Santamaría; 1968 (age 57–58); San Sebastián, Spain
- Occupations: Actress; television presenter
- Years active: 1992–present

Teresa "Tessa" Andonegi Santamaría (born 1968) is a Spanish actress and television presenter best known for her work in Basque-language film and television.

== Biography ==
Andonegi was born in San Sebastián. She moved to Littleton, Colorado, at the age of 17 to learn English. At the age of 24, she made her television debut as a presenter of the program Olé tus vídeos, on which she worked from 1992 to 1993. She later starred as Idoia on the Basque-language series Goenkale from 1995 to 1996. In 2008, she returned to Goenkale as Alizia Egiguren, a character she played until 2015.

== Filmography ==
Year	Title	Role	Notes	Ref.
1992–1993	Olé tus vídeos	Presenter	Season 2; ETB 2 broadcast	
1995–1996	Goenkale	Idoia	Season 2	
2008–2015	Goenkale	Alizia Egiguren	Seasons 15–22	
2022–2026	Irabazi arte!	Idoia	Seasons 1–5	
