= Palacio del Marqués de Portugalete =

Spanish palace built in the 1860s

Coordinates: 40.41952°N 3.69033°W

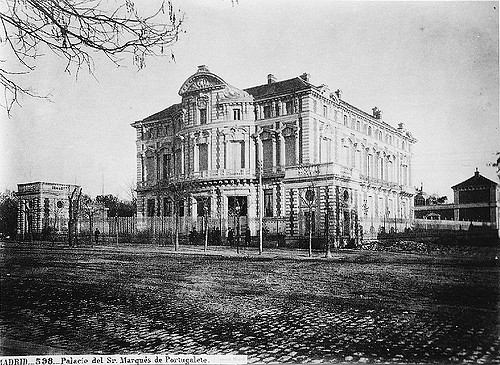
Palacio del Marqués de Portugalete photographed by Jean Laurent in 1880 for Urbanity.

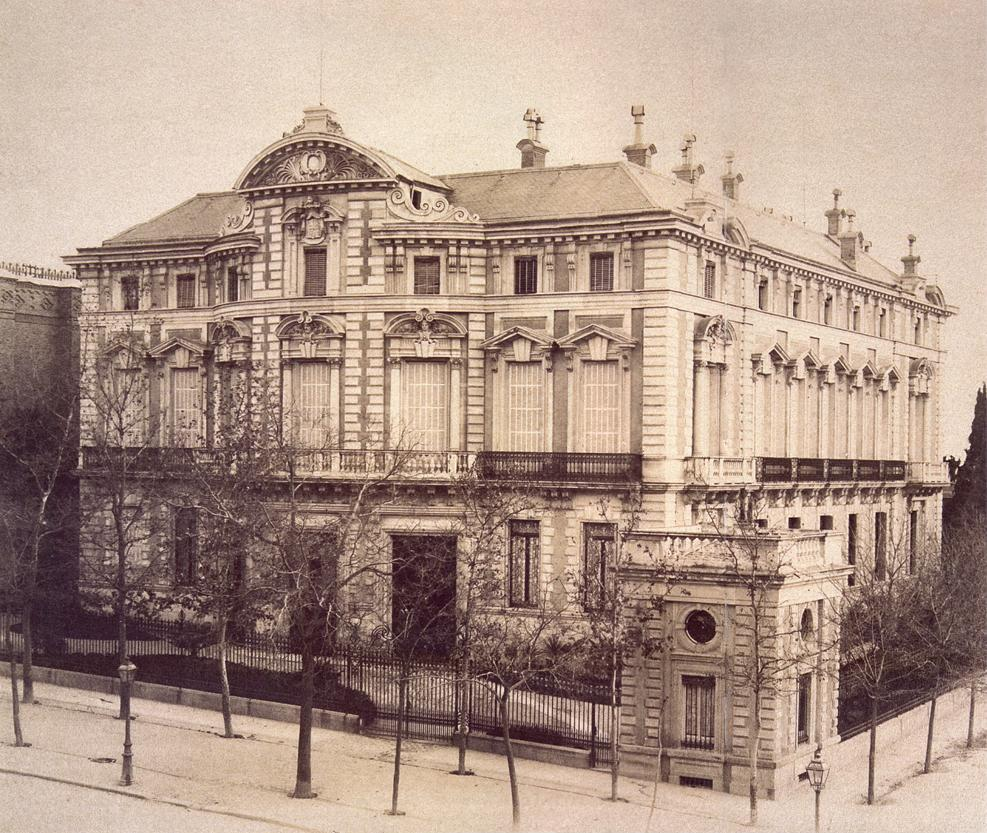
Palacio del Marqués de Portugalete in the late 19th century.

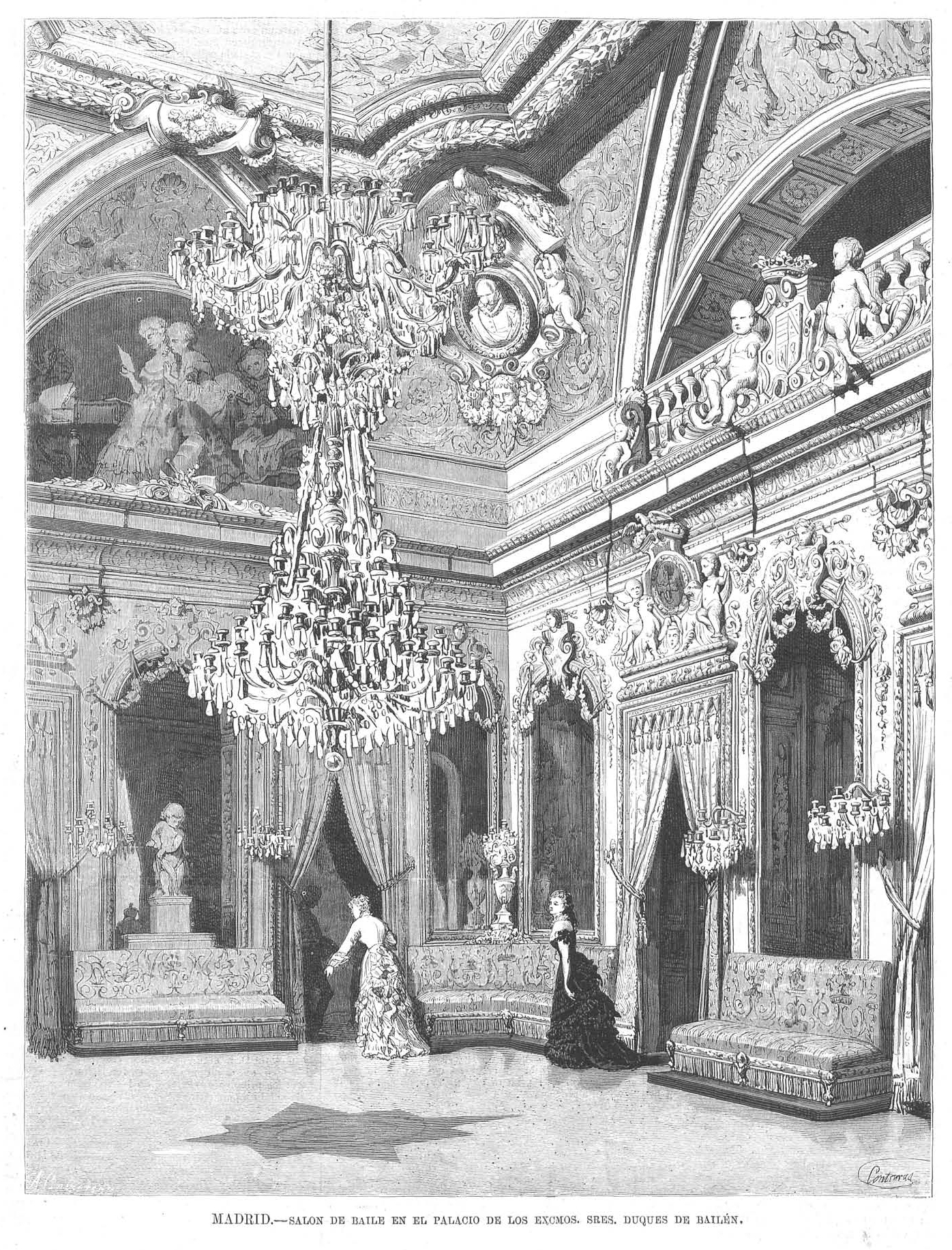
A hall in the Palacio del Marqués de Portugalete.

The Palacio del Marqués de Portugalete was a grand palace built in the 1860s, located at 56 Calle de Alcalá, on the corner of Calle Alfonso XI, in Madrid. Also known as the Palace of Bailén, it belonged to the family of Francisco Javier Castaños y Aragorri, a descendant of General Francisco Castaños, who was the victor at the Battle of Bailén. It was built by architect Adolfo Ombretch, who also built the nearby palace of Linares. For many years it was a venue for the wealthy elite to meet and discuss national politics. It was demolished after the Spanish Civil War, and in 1946, replaced by the National Institute of Forecast, now occupied by the National Institute of Health.

== History ==
The palace was built during the reign of Isabel II. Its owner was the Marquis of Portugalete and the Duke of Bailén, originally called the "Bailén Castaños", a title created in 1833 by King Ferdinand VII for of General Castaños, and declared perpetual and hereditary in 1847 by Queen Isabel II. General Castaños died childless, so the property passed to the peerages of Luis Ángel de Carondelet y Castaños, his sister's son, and her husband the Baron of Carondelet, the 2nd Marquisate of Portugalete.

The design and construction were executed by Flemish architect Adolf Ombrecht. It had a ballroom decorated with flowers, a chapel, a billiard room, a hall of portraits, bathrooms decorated in Pompeian style by the painter Oreste Mancini, a gallery museum, a music hall and a large number of dependencies. The palace contained tapestries and paintings by Francisco Goya, Vicente López, Palmaroli, Eduardo Rosales, Bartolomé Esteban Murillo, Francisco Pradilla Ortiz, Madrazo, Antonio Gisbert, José Casado del Alisal, and the renowned sculptor Mariano Benlliure. The palace featured Carrara marble, ebony and ivory furnitures, colorful chandeliers and windows.

The palace was built in the center of its lot, and had an inner courtyard with garden.

The palace was built of alternating stone and brick. stone primarily for corners, gables, cornices, doorways and windows. To highlight the design of the central body, the facade of the calle de Alcalá formed a curved space.

At the death without descendants in 1882 of the third Duke of Bailén, Eduardo de Carondelete y Donado, the titles passed to his niece, Encarnación Fernández de Córdoba. The palace and its contents however were inherited by his widow, María Dolores del Collado y Echagüe, who really gave it luster and fame, especially through her celebrated parties and meetings.

For many years the palace was a meeting place for the wealthy and political classes of the time, such as Cánovas del Castillo. In its halls national politics were so commonplace that once, leaving Cánovas this palace with a large representation of the Government, a reporter asked: "Mr. President, had there a been Council meeting?"

The palace was demolished after the Spanish Civil War to make way for new forms of urbanism and in 1946, the building of the National Insurance Institute, later called the National Institute of Health, was built in its place.

== Gallery ==
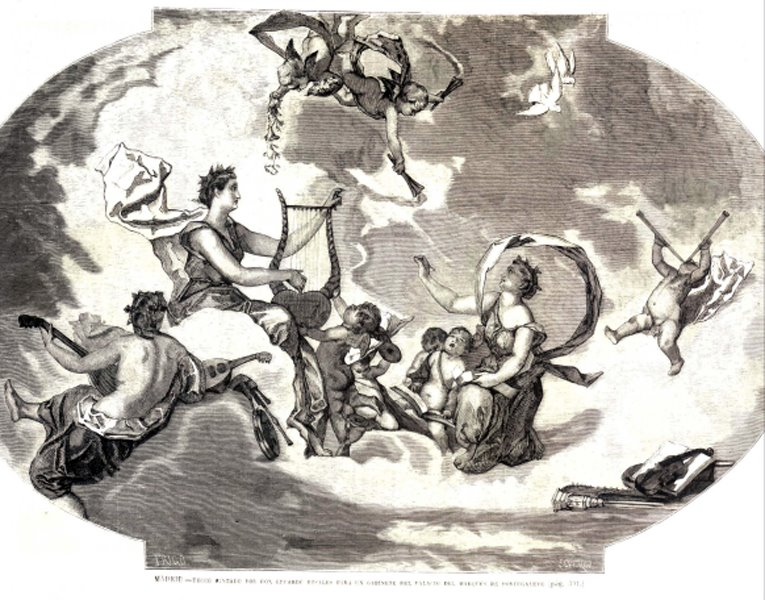
Roof of a room of the Palacio del Marqués de Portugalete. Painted by Eduardo Rosales. Photo taken in 1871.

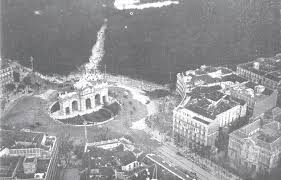
Aerial view of the Plaza de la Independencia and the Puerta de Alcalá, with the Palacio del Marqués de Portugalete bottom right. Photo: Juanjo for Urbanity (late-19th c.).

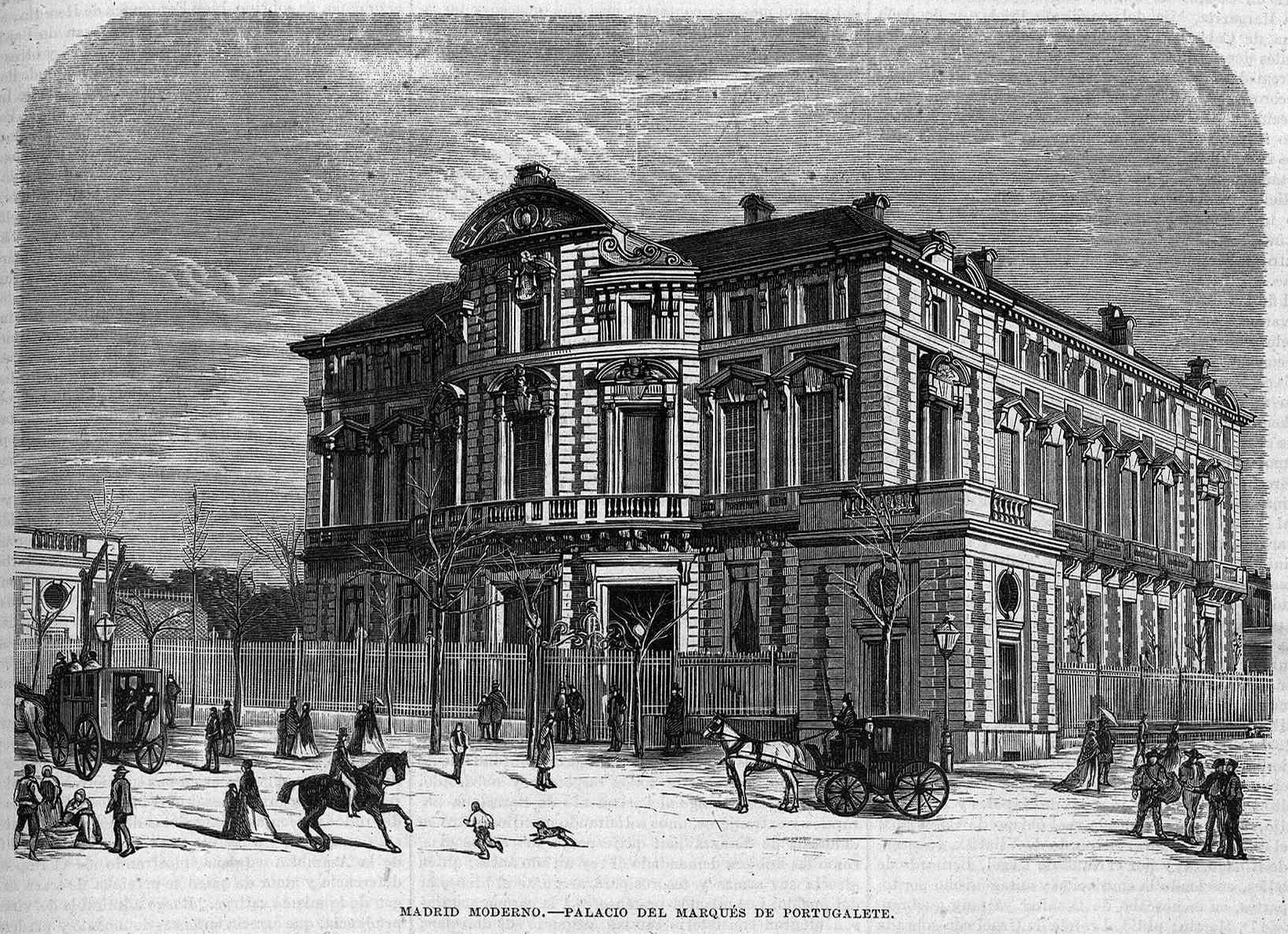
Palacio del Marqués de Portugalete, engraving from photograph of Jean Laurent, according to the index of the first page of the magazine La Ilustración de Madrid.

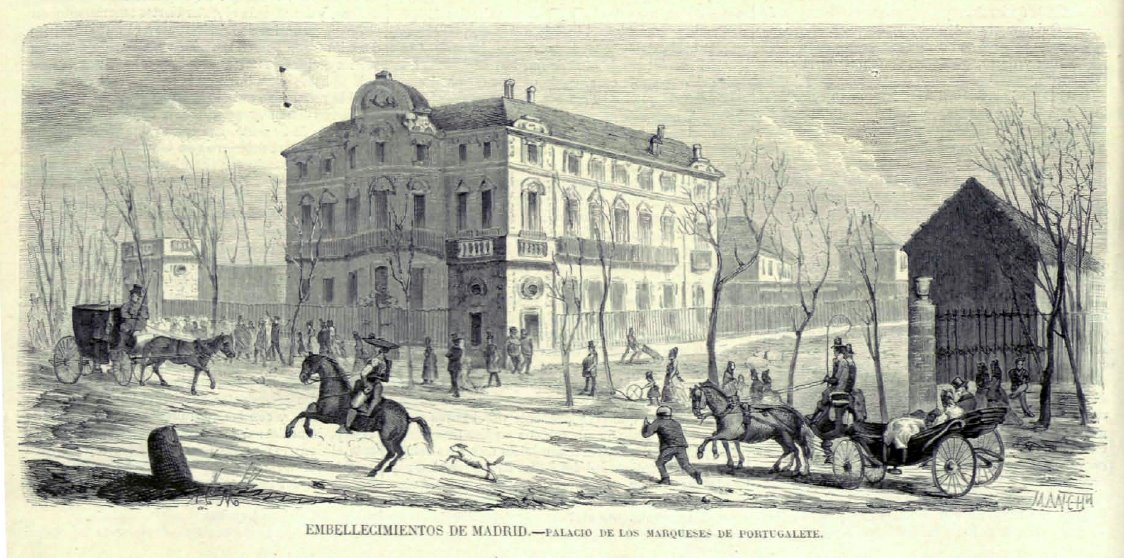
Palacio del Marqués de Portugalete. 1870 Drawing.
