= Black Is Beltza =

2018 Spanish animated film

Black is Beltza
- Theatrical release poster
- Directed by: Fermín Muguruza
- Screenplay by: Fermín Muguruza; Harkaitz Cano; Eduard Sola
- Cinematography: Beñat Beitia
- Edited by: Dani Azpitarte
- Music by: Fermín Muguruza; Raül Refree
- Production companies: Setmàgic Audiovisual; Talka Records and Films
- Release date: 5 October 2018
- Running time: 88 minutes
- Country: Spain
- Language: Spanish

Black is Beltza is a 2018 adult animated drama film directed by Fermín Muguruza (in his directorial debut) from a screenplay by Muguruza, Harkaitz Cano and Eduard Sola, based on the graphic novel of the same name by Muguruza, Cano and Jorge Alderet. A co-production by Setmàgic Audiovisual and Talka Records and Films, the soundtrack was composed by Muguruza, a Basque rock musician, and Raül Refree, a Spanish record producer. The film was released in Spain on 5 October 2018, and was nominated for Best Animated Feature at the Gaudí Awards.

== Premise ==
In October 1965, a group of processional giants, inspired by parades in Pamplona, is invited to march down New York’s 5th Avenue on Hispanic Day. But due to the racial discrimination policies, two black giants are not allowed in the parade. Debarring from this true-event, which happened a few months after Malcolm X’s death the story turns on Manex, a young Basque who travels to New York to walk inside one of the carnival giants.

Manex will be an inadvertent witness to various events prior to the late 1970s: Racial riots, the Black Panthers, the Cuban Revolution, Cold War spy games, which all make for a colourful portrait of the ’60s counterculture era.

== Accolades ==
Released in Spain on 5 October 2018, Black is Beltza was nominated for two accolades:

Award	Date	Category	Recipient(s)	Result	Ref
Emile Awards	8 December 2018	Best Soundtrack in a Feature Film	Fermín Muguruza and Raül Refree	Nominated	
Gaudí Awards	27 January 2019	Best Animated Feature	Fermín Muguruza	Nominated	
Quirino Awards	6 April 2019	Best Sound Design and Original Music	Fermín Muguruza and Raül Refree	Won	

== Sequel ==
A sequel, titled Black Is Beltza II: Ainhoa was released in 2022. It follows Ainhoa, the daughter of Manex, who had inherited his social commitment and taste for adventure.
