= Asti Leku Ikastola =

Private school in Spain

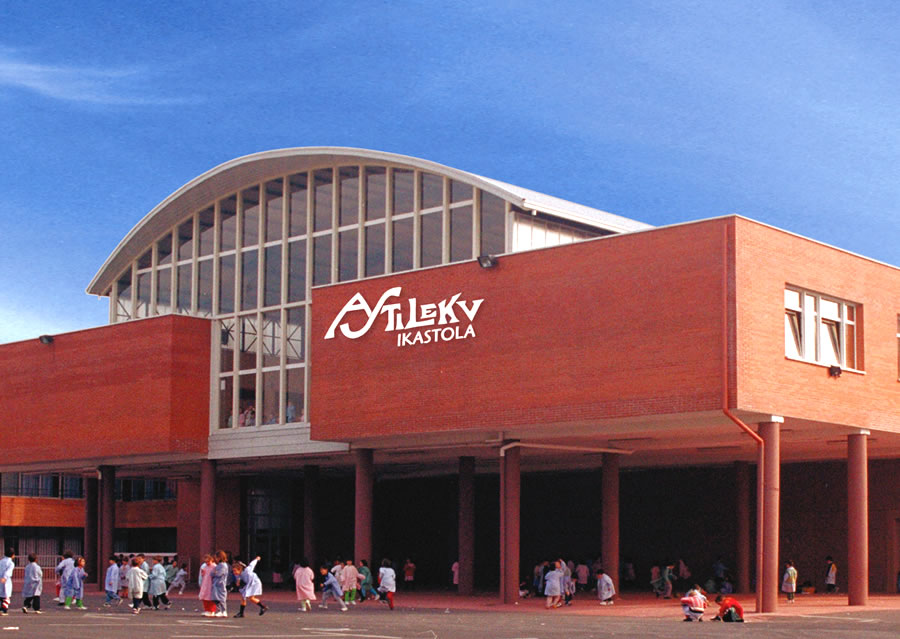

Location
- Grumete Diego, 19; Portugalete; Basque Country; Spain, Biscay, 48910; 43.3162°N 3.0296°W

Information
- School type: private school, private school
- Motto: It is modified annually
- Established: 1963
- Founders: Sabin Ipiña, Juantxu Beitia, Alejandro Echevarría, Félix Arambarri and others
- Principal: Jesús Bilbao
- Age: 2 to 18
- Language: Basque, Spanish, English, French
- Website: https://astileku.eus
- In Basque, the official name of the educational center is "Asti Leku" (which means literally "leisure place"). The term "ikastola" means "school" in Basque. The equivalent in English would be "Asti Leku School" or "Asti Leku College". In addition, in Spain there is a difference between "college" (private/independent education) and "school" (public/state education). So it could be translated with both terms.

Asti Leku Ikastola is a Basque private school, created in 1963, located in Portugalete (Biscay). It currently has 1,800 students (approx.) and is one of the largest private schools in the Basque Autonomous Community and in the whole Basque Country.

The school contains both primary and secondary school (high school), and it offers kindergarten, primary education, secondary education, Spanish Baccalaureate education and Selectividad, from 2 to 18 years. It is one of the private schools most known and prominent in the Basque Country.

The school has been the alma mater of a President of the Basque Government, deputies, mayors of different cities and other politicians and notable alumni. In addition, its teaching team has included a President of the Basque Government, a Leader of the Opposition in the Basque Parliament, deputies and other notables.

The school was created in the Francoist Spain and its objective was to instill the Basque language, the Basque culture and the historical and cultural values of Basque Country.

The owner of the school is the enterprise "Asti Leku Cooperative Society" (teaching cooperative enterprise), and it is associated in Ikastolen Elkartea, association of all the Basque Country's cooperative owned private schools. As of 31 December 2020, the cooperative "Asti Leku S. Coop." had a total of 2,409 cooperativist member families (the families are the owner members of both the cooperative and the school).

== History ==
The school arose in a complex process, through which several private schools of the territory were incorporated until arriving at the great school that is nowadays, a reference in Biscay. Everything arose from the initiative of a group of families, who undertook a long journey in the teaching of Basque by their own private homes. These families wanted to build an innovative educational project, which includes the cultural, social and linguistic values of the Basque Country. Among the promoters of Basque culture, like Sabin Ipiña, Juantxu Beitia, Alejandro Echevarría, Pablo Escudero, José Miguel de Barandiaran ...

It began in 1963 with the creation of the Elai-Alai school in Portugalete. The priest and promoter of Basque folklore and culture, José Miguel de Barandiarán, and Sabin Ipiña were some of the many people involved in the project, they took their first steps in the Francoist Spain, and they have to look for a student in their homes. Soon after, the Bihotz Gaztea school in Santurtzi, the Umeen Etxea children's school in Sestao (in 1968), the Itxaropena school in Trapagaran and the Alkartu school in Barakaldo were created, which were integrated into Asti Leku in the following years and in 1971, the children's schools were unified in the Patronato de Sestao in Sestao.

In 1975 the enterprise Asti Leku S. Coop. (consumers' co-operative business) was created, as holder of the school, at whose first Annual general meeting the first outline of what would be the new school was presented and the land was bought. That design responded to the intention of combining sport, culture, leisure and education and once approved, the advertising campaign was launched throughout Biscay: "Let's see if we can / Denon artean egiten badogu, danona izango da".

In 1978 the school moved to Portugalete and the current Primary Education building was inaugurated. That same year, the first general director of the company and the director of the ikastola were hired. In 1980 the schools Elai-Alai, Repélega (Urepelaga) and Lora-Barri (Portugalete) and Umeen-Etxea (Sestao) entered the Asti-Leku school. In 1982 the school celebrated its first Ibilaldia, and the following year, in 1983, Asti Leku Club became a Sports Society.

In 2006, the school receives the "Quality Silver Q" prize awarded by Euskalit. In 2013, it celebrates the second Ibilaldia, and in addition, its 50th anniversary. In 2014, the Town Planning Agreement was signed with the Municipality of Portugalete, for the expansion of Asti-Leku, and the project "Batxilergo Berria / Nuevo bachillerato" was launched.

== Nowadays ==
The school has four classes per course (A, B, D, E), with about 100–120 students per course and has, around, 1,900 students in total. The school has kindergarten building, pre-school education building, primary education building, secondary education building, Baccalaureate education building, four football fields, three basketball courts, a pediment, an athletics track, indoor and outdoor parking, three dining rooms, four gyms ...

The school is also the official exam centre of Trinity College London ESOL and Cambridge, as well as numerous other projects. With regard to the dining service, the school hires the services of the business Auzo-Lagun S. Coop. (belonging to the Ausolan Group, part of the Erkop Group).

The school is a reference in Biscay and it is known for its good results and qualifications in Selectividad (similar to the A Level, required for university entrance). The school has also been criticized for being considered "elitist and posh" and for expelling bad students from the school.

In July 2019 there was a fire in the Primary Education building.

== Agenda 21 / Agenda 2030 School Council ==
Asti Leku has had a school council for several years related to "Agenda 21" / "Agenda 2030" (currently), on environmentalism and climate change. The school council carries out projects related to ecology, including going to the City Council of Portugalete to present their projects to municipal representatives and to the Mayor of Portugalete. The group is framed within the Local Agenda 21 (LA21) / Local Agenda 2030, on local initiatives for sustainable development goals, global citinzenship and climate change. The group coordinator is Román Beristain. Thanks to this Agenda 2030 Local initiative, in 2023 Portugalete became the first European municipality to achieve Zero Waste in its school cafeterias.

== Emaiok Group ==
The school created the "Emaiok Group" ("Emaiok Taldea") a few years ago. The group's objective is to promote Basque and work in the world of Basque, for which it carries out various works related to Basque, on the International Day of the Basque Language (December 3), Basque music and dance, etc. The group coordinator is Miren Matanzas. Among the former members of the Emaiok Group are, among others, Asier Alcedo, Ibabe Beristain or Iholdi Beristain, who were part of the group while studying at the ikastola, during their time as students.

== Notable teachers ==
Notable teachers:

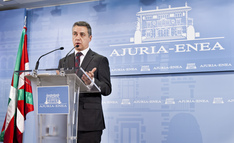
Iñigo Urkullu, President of the Basque Government

- Iñigo Urkullu, teacher and politician, President of the Basque Government and President of the EAJ-PNV
- Laura Mintegi, author, teacher, professor and politician, deputy of the Basque Parliament, Leader of the Opposition in the Basque Parliament
- Txusa Padrones, historian and politician, deputy of the General Assemblies of Biscay
- Fernando Valgañón, actor and stage director
- Txus Bilbao, philologist, teacher and politician
- Jon Lazkano, philologist, teacher and politician
- Miren Matanzas, philologist, teacher and politician
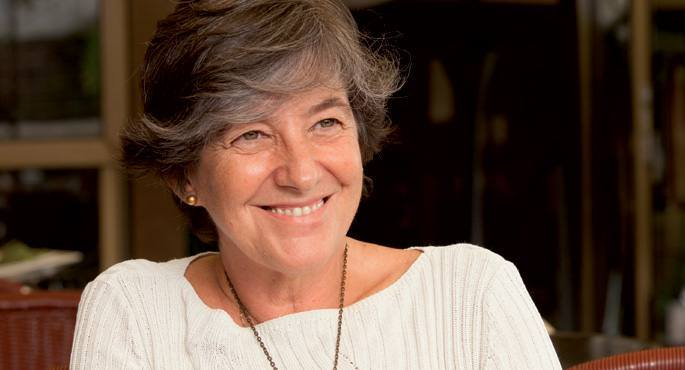
  Laura Mintegi, deputy of the Basque Parliament, Leader of the Opposition in the Basque Parliament
- Guillermo Vio, teacher and politician

== Notable alumni ==
Notable students:

- Ainhoa Basabe, politician, Mayor of the City of Sestao
- Aintzane Urkijo, politician, Mayor of the City of Santurtzi
- Imanol Pradales, sociologist and politician, President of the Basque Government
- Gorka Egia García, politician, deputy of the General Assemblies of Biscay
- Patricia de la Torre, politician
- Fernando Valgañón, actor and stage director
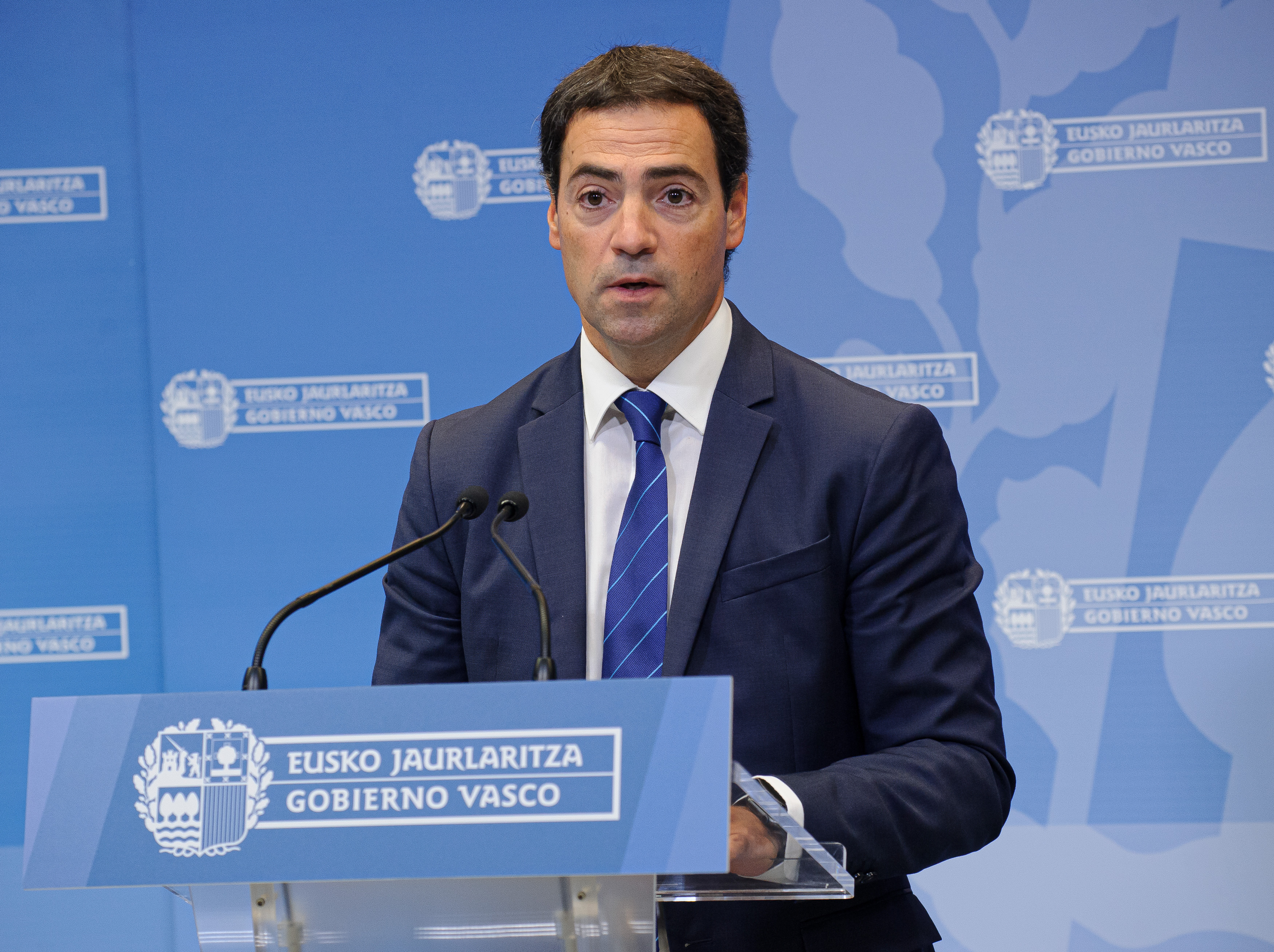
  Imanol Pradales, sociologist and politician, President of the Basque Government
- Lohitzune Rodríguez, dancer and choreographer
- Nahikari Rodríguez, actress
- Roberto Berrocal, pianist
- Ivan Jiménez Aira, lawyer and businessperson, managing director of Bizkaia Talent
- Mikel Santiago, novelist
- Xabier Eskurza, footballer
- Ander Alaña, footballer
- Iñaki Goitia, footballer
- Eva Martín, singer
- Ibabe Beristain, dancer and musician
- Iholdi Beristain, singer
- Asier Zaballa, musician

== Awards ==
- 2006, "Q de plata de Calidad" otorgada por EUSKALIT
