= Danza Contemporanea de Cuba =

Cuban contemporary dance company

Danza Contemporanea de Cuba ("Contemporary Dance of Cuba") is a contemporary dance company based in Havana, Cuba, combining modern American theatre, Afro-Caribbean dance styles and classical European Ballet.

== History ==
The company was founded in 1959 as the Conjunto Nacional de Danza Moderna (National Modern Dance Ensemble) by Ramiro Guerra Suarez, who moulded Danza Contemporanea’s repertoire into a Cuban blend of ballet and folklore styles. In 1971 Guerra was separated from the company and ostracized by the government, although he was partially rehabilitated in 1978. It was in 1971 that the name of the company was changed to Danza Nacional de Cuba, until 1987; in that period the company went through several directors.

Since 1987 Danza Contemporanea de Cubahas been under the direction of Miguel Iglesias, who started dancing with the company in 1975. With more than 70 productions in its active repertoire, Danza Contemporanea de Cuba has toured throughout America, Europe, Asia and Africa. This dance is mainly to relax and freely move around in a comfortable way.

== Members ==
The founder, Ramiro Guerra Suarez, widely known as the grandfather of modern dance in Cuba, is a dancer, dance teacher, choreographer and dance researcher who has published Appreciation of Dance in 1969, The Theatricalization of Folklore and Other Essays in 1989 and Dancing Caliban in 1998.

The current membership includes Director Miguel A. Iglesias Ferrer and Regisseur Isidro Rolando Thondike, with Maîtres Luís Roblejo, Dulce María Vale, Isabel Blanco, Margarita Vilela, Luz M. Collazo, Theo clikard and Yoerlis Brunet.

The choreography is provided by Resident Choreographers are Isidro Rolando, Jorge Abril, Lidice Nunez, George Céspedes, Julio César Iglesias and Osnel Delgado and Invited Choreographers Jan Linkens, Joaquín Sabaté, Gianni di Cicco, Kenneth Kvamström, Samir Akika, Cathy Marston, Rafael Bonachela and Mats Ek.

== Sources ==
- Perron, Wendy (March 2007). "Enchanted by Cuba: Dance Magazine's editor in chief, Wendy Perron, travels to Havana for its International Ballet Festival". Dance Magazine. 81 (3).
- Video interview of Miguel Iglesias director of Danza Contemporanea de Cuba Company on Havana-Cultura
- Cuba Absolutely – Music and Dance - Cuba Dance – Cuban Danza Contemporary Company
- SkyArts – Carlos Acosta and the Danza Contemporanea de Cuba. Reviewed by Ian Palmer
- New York Public Library – Exhibition: Dance in Cuba
