= Twist (Cano novel) =

2013 crime novel by Basque writer Harkaitz Cano

- Author: Harkaitz Cano
- Translator: Amaia Gabantxo
- Language: Basque
- Genre: Crime fiction
- Publisher: Editorial Susa (Basque); Seix Barral (Spanish); Archipelago Books (English)
- Publication date: 2011
- English publication date: 2018

Twist is a 2011 crime novel, with elements of political thriller, written by Basque writer Harkaitz Cano. The book won the 2012 Basque Literature Prize. The original Basque version was published by the Editorial Susa in 2011, Gerardo Markuleta translated the novel to Spanish and it was published by Seix Barral in 2013. The English translation by Amaia Gabantxo was published in 2018 by Archipelago Books.

Set in the 1980s, the protagonist, Diego Lazkano, who works as an interpreter, has two best friends, Zeberio and Soto who are arrested, tortured and ultimately murdered by a Spanish Civil Guard. The murder of his friends changes everything in Lazkano's life. The novel deals with the avenging of Lazkano's friends, and his relationship with a girl named Gloria.

== Narrative strategy ==
The author relates the events in his novel with art, he mentions his favorite painters and talks about the works that have marked more, it distances the reader from the main plot, the Soto and Zeberio starring. The author loves art and this is reflected in his novel, with mentions whining to the art world in general. Use art as if it were a code secret, using it, is the remains of the two killed as one more piece of artistic collection. Cano creates a narration very fast by modern technique, using the premise of some events that occurred in the 80s, to enter all these years now. In this way he achieved a very fast narration using a narrative technique that forces the reader to move very quickly between the plot, telling only the events of more notoriety.

== History ==
This narrative is based around real events, specifically the murder of young Basques' Lasa and Zabala. These two murders occurred during La Guerra Sucia ("the Dirty War") where the Spanish government, from 1983 to 1987, established illegal death squads to fight Basque nationalist and separatist organizations. Lasa and Zabala were arrested in the town of Baiona, a municipality in France, and then taken to the city of San Sebastian in Spain, where they were tortured. Lasa and Zabala were eventually taken to Alicante, Spain, where they were shot dead and buried. Three years after their murders, a farmer in Alicante called a radio station informing the station that he had found bones. This call led to the unearthing of Lasa and Zabala's story.

== Characters ==
=== Diego Lazkano ===
Diego Lazkano is a translator and a part of the band that fights for the liberation of the Basque Country. In the charter named "Redy Made", he speaks about his quiet life, although he remembers over and over again the events that occurred in the 1980s. In his childhood, he joins a theatre group, because of his love for a girl named Gloria, where he met his two best friends, Soto and Zeberio. Later, Diego, both the protagonist and narrator, condemns his two best friends while they're being tortured by the Civil Guard. His separation from his best friends and their joint murder takes a huge leap in his life. The suspicions are raised and revenge is considered necessary, which changed Diego's life forever from then onwards.

=== Gloria ===
To start speaking with the description of Gloria, one has to say that the description is given from the point of view of Diego Lazkano. Diego Lazkano illustrates in the book that she has short hair which with time is becoming more and more grey and with a black complexion. She is not married and she has no children. She lives in Barcelona, in a little loft located in the Monjuic district. She has no relation with his family for two reasons: because she liked the freedom of living alone and because relations with his father were very bad, as he is a fascist. In the book, she commonly argued with Lazkano about politics, arts and other issues. She is an artist, but she doesn't sell many books. Seeing that, she begin to take drugs.

=== Murders ===
- Xabi Soto: He works in the building construction of Gloria as a constructor. Is a fiend of Zeberio and Lazkano. He is murdered after being tortured and buried near the Mediterranean for the reason of being part of E.T.A.
- Zeberio: He was killed together with Soto and in the same situation.Like his friends Lazkano and Soto, he worked in the work of Gloria.

=== Civil Guards ===
- Hernandez and Vargas: The reply Rodrigo's orders, they don't think about themselves and they are not happy with the things that they done.
- Rodrigo Mesa lieutenant colonel: He believes in his work more than anything else. straight, which he likes to fulfil their orders without questioning anything at all.

=== Others ===
- Furmica is the fascist and aristocratic father of Gloria. He is a lieutenant, and his appearance is more than 75 years.
- Gabriel Lazkano is the father of Diego. Lives in Mexico. When he was ill, he disappeared from the life of his son. His son believes he is dead.
- Meliton Manzanas: The first police who deliberately killed ETA. Torturer. He charged favors from mothers and sisters of the detainees as it suited him. He was accused of collaborating with the Nazis in the extermination of the Jews in exchange of people in which the Spanish government was interested.
- Santiago Cervera: Medical and friend of the father of Diego Lazkano. There is talk in the book that says that he was involved in dirty things. Disappearance of children, use of violence.

== See also ==
- 2011 in literature
- Basque literature
