= Olatz Gorrotxategi =

Spanish actor, drama teacher and theatre director

- Born: Olatz Gorrotxategi Gangoiti; 1982 (age 43–44); Bilbao, Spain
- Education: BAI Performing Arts Training Center (BA); Leeds Beckett University (BA)
- Occupations: Actress, drama teacher, theatre director
- Years active: 2002–present
- Employer: BAI Performing Arts Training Center
- Organization: ACT Festival – International Festival for Emerging Performing Artists

Olatz Gorrotxategi Gangoiti (born 1982) is a Spanish Actor, theatre pedagogue and theatre director.

== Life and career ==
Olatz Gorrotxategi was born in Bilbao, Spain. Gorrotxategi trained in performing arts between 2000 and 2004 and in stage direction in 2005 at the BAI Performing Arts Training Center. She later got a BA in Performance Arts at the Leeds Beckett University (LBU) in the United Kingdom in 2007. Since 2004, she has worked as drama teacher at the BAI Performing Arts Training Center, giving classes on acting, character, character construction, dramatic play, ...

In addition to the pedagogical branch, she is also a theatre stage director, actress and dramaturgue.

In 2006, her theatrical production "Happy Birthday" (2006–2007) was selected by the International Young Makers Marathon (IYMM) to represent the piece at different European festivals, within the IYMM program.

In November 2008, she directed a theatrical production called We, the children (Nosotros, los niños / Gu, haurrak), produced by the BAI Performing Arts Training Center, on the occasion of the 50th anniversary of World Children's Day, which was premiered and performed at the Barakaldo Theatre, and whose premiere was attended by the then mayor of e city Tontxu Rodríguez.

Her theatrical work "Coordenadas" was selected and awarded a scholarship by New Dramaturgy of Donostia Kultura 2016.

She is the coordinator of the ACT Festival – International Festival for Emerging Performing Artists. Since 2021, she is a collaborating announcer in the Performing Arts section of the Kultura.eus program on Radio Euskadi of EITB.

== Selected filmography and works ==
=== Theatre ===
As actress:

- 2015, Hermanas, dir. Fer Montoya
- 2016, 43º13’44’’N, dir. Olatz Gorrotxategi

As theatre director:

- 2006, Happy Birthday (2006–2007).
- 2008, We, the children (Nosotros, los niños / Gu, haurrak), BAI Performing Arts Training Center theatrical production for Children's Day (premiered and performed at the Barakaldo Theatre).
- 2008, El exilio de tus seres de PVC (2008–2010).
- 2015, Hermanas.
- 2016, 43º13’44’’N.
- 2017, Coordendas (premiered and performed at the Teatro Arriaga).
- 2018, Mari eta Gaileta Fabrika.
- 2018, Jauría, BAI Performing Arts Training Center theatrical production (premiered and performed at the Barakaldo Theatre).
- 2018, AntiTour.
- 2018, Aldamio etxea izango da gurea!
- 2019, Ganeko Crew.
- 2020, Lurrun Minez.
- 2022, Mierda de Ciudad (premiered and performed at the Barakaldo Theatre).
