= Karmele Jaio =

Basque writer and journalist

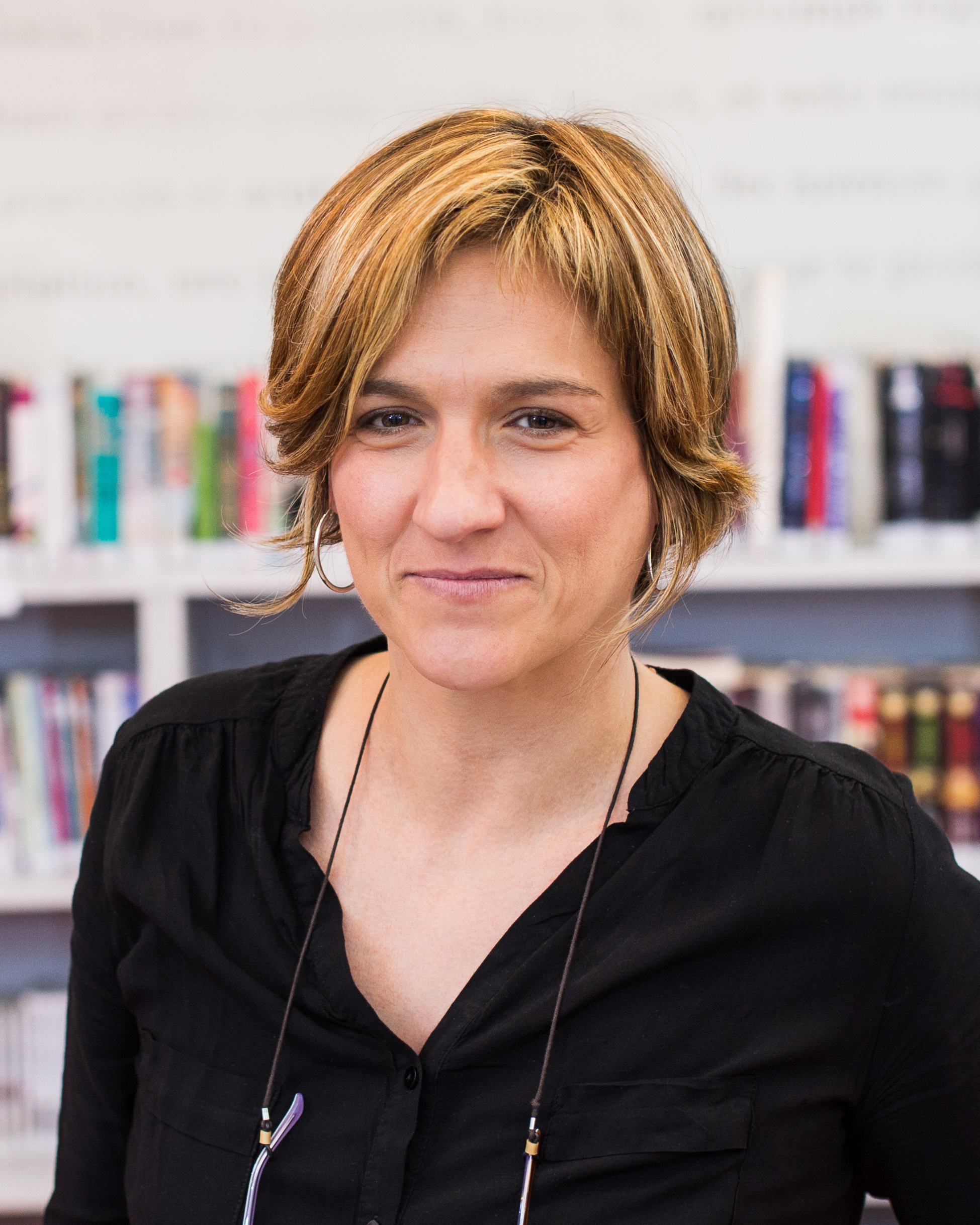
- Karmele Jaio (2016)
- Born: March 19, 1970 (age 56); Vitoria-Gasteiz, Spain
- Education: University of the Basque Country
- Occupations: writer; journalist
- Writing career
- Language: Basque
- Genres: novels; short stories; poetry
- Notable works: Amaren eskuak; Aitaren etxea
- Website: karmelejaio.com

Karmele Jaio Eiguren (Vitoria-Gasteiz, March 19, 1970) is a Basque writer and journalist whose works have been translated into Catalan, German, Russian, Spanish, and English. She is the recipient of multiple awards for Amaren eskuak (2006, Elkar) and Aitaren etxea (Elkar, 2019).

== Early life and education ==
Karmele Jaio Eiguren was born in Vitoria-Gasteiz, Spain, in 1970.

She graduated in Information Sciences in 1993–94 from the University of the Basque Country.

== Career ==
Karmele Jaio (2019 video by Ahotsak.eus)

Since graduation, she has worked in various media outlets. She has been head of communications for the Euskalgintza Elkarlanean Foundation or head of communications for Emakunde (Basque Women's Institute). She occasionally publishes columns in media such as Diario de Noticias de Álava, Noticias de Gipuzkoa, and Deia.

She has published stories, novels and poetry. Some of her stories have been adapted for the theatre: director Ramón Barea directed the play Ecografías in 2010, based on the author's story of the same name. Her stories have been published in numerous anthologies and her works have been translated into Catalan, German, Russian, Spanish, and English. Since July 2015, she has been a corresponding academic of Euskaltzaindia, the Royal Academy of the Basque Language.

== Selected works ==
=== Poetry collections ===
- Orain hilak ditugu (2015, Elkar). ISBN 8490273995

=== Short stories ===
- Hamabost zauri (2004, Elkar).ISBN 8497831683

- Published in Spanish as, Heridas crónicas (2010, Ttarttalo). ISBN 8498432251

- Zu bezain ahul (2007, Elkar). ISBN 8497835131
- Ez naiz ni (2012, Elkar). ISBN 849027035X

=== Novels ===
- Amaren eskuak (2006, Elkar). Published in Spanish as Las manos de mi madre, (Ttarttalo, 2008). ISBN 8497833422

- Adapted for the cinema by Mireia Gabilondo and presented at the Festival Internacional de Cine de San Sebastián.

- Musika airean (2010, Elkar). Published in Spanish as Música en el aire (Ttarttalo, 2013). ISBN 8497837320
- Aitaren etxea (Elkar, 2019). La casa del padre (Destino, 2020). My father's house (Dedalus Ltd., 2023). ISBN 9788490278444

== Awards ==
- 2006, Beterriko Liburua Saria for Amaren eskuak.
- 2006, Prix Zilarrezko Euskadi for Amaren eskuak.
- 2006, 111 Akademia saria for Amaren eskuak.
- 2007, Zazpi Kale Saria for Amaren eskuak.
- 2010, II Ezequiel Etxebarria Saria for Amaren eskuak.
- 2012, VII Igartza Saria for Amaren eskuak.
- 2019, 111 Akademia saria for Aitaren etxea.
- 2020, Premios Euskadi de Literatura for Aitaren etxea.
