= Olga Arlauskas =

Russian-Spanish filmmaker and film director

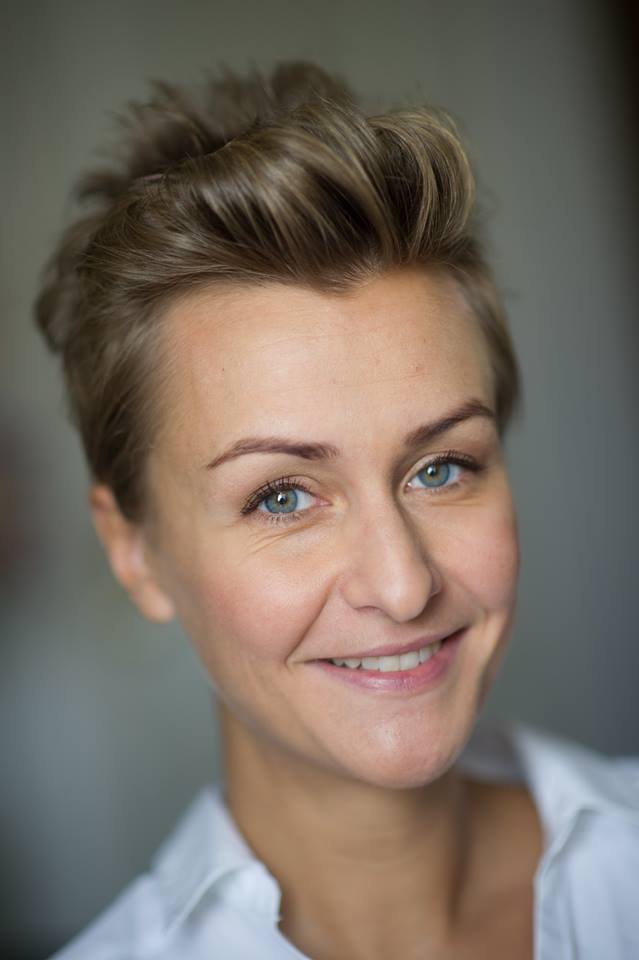
- Olga Arlauskas
- Born: Olga Algisovna Arlauskas Shimanskaya; 18 July 1981 (age 44); Moscow, Russia
- Citizenship: Russia, Spain
- Education: University of the Basque Country High Courses for Scriptwriters and Film Directors
- Occupation: film director
- Spouse: Nikita Tikhonov-Rau
- Parents: Algis Arlauskas (father); Marina Shimanskaya (mother)

Olga Algisovna Arlauskas Shimanskaya (born 18 July 1981) is a Russian-Spanish film director.

== Life and career ==
Olga Arlauskas was born on 18 July 1981 in Moscow. In 1991 she moved to Spain, where she studied the bachelor's degree (BA) in audiovisual communication at the University of the Basque Country (UPV/EHU).

In 2004 she got a grant from Spanish government to study filmmaking and moved back to Russia. In 2006 she graduated as a documentary filmmaker from VKSR (High Courses for Scriptwriters and Film Directors). Since then she had been working for Channel One Russia, Channel Kultura, Russia Today (Spanish version) and made nearly 20 documentary films in all possible doc genres from intimate doc portraits to prime-time TV-blockbusters.

She has been awarded by mostly all Russian and international Film Festivals for her award-winning project «Labels» (26′, 2011). She is Member of the Russian Documentary Guild.
