= Richard Sahagún =

Spanish film, stage and television actor

- Born: Richard Sahagún Rodríguez; 31 July 1982 (age 42); Bilbao, Spain
- Citizenship: Spain
- Occupation(s): actor, stage director, film director

Richard Sahagún Rodríguez (born 31 July 1982, Bilbao, Spain) is a Spanish actor and stage and film director.

== Life and career ==
He studied, trained and graduated in theatre, drama and acting (BA) in Artebi School of Dramatic Art (predecessor of the current Ánima Eskola School of Drama) with Marina Shimanskaya and Algis Arlauskas, training as a method actor, under the Stanislavsky-Vakhtangov-M.Chekhov-Meyerhold methodology (Russian method), following the methodologies of the Russian classical school.

He has worked in different theatrical productions in different theaters. In February 2010 he created the "Vagón de 4ª" theater company together with David Valdelvira. In 2014 he was appointed artistic director of the Hacería theater in Bilbao. In this context, he created the "Hacería Theater Company", with actresses and actors from the Scenic and Theatrical Research Laboratories of the Hacería theater.

As a film and television actor he has worked in more than 25 film and television productions.

As a theater director, he has produced several great theatrical productions, in theaters such as the Teatro Arraiga, such as an adaptation of Kafka's The Metamorphosis, Horse / Dostoevsky or King Lear.

== Filmography ==
=== Television ===
- 2020, Patria, HBO Spain
- 2019, La que se avecina, Telecinco
- 2015–2016, El ministerio del tiempo, La 1
- 2014–present, Fantasmagórica
- 2012, El secreto de Puente Viejo, Antena 3
- 2012, Hispania, la leyenda, Antena 3
- 2012, Águila Roja, TVE
- 2009, Mi gemela es hija única, Telecinco
- 2008, El comisario, Telecinco
- 2007, Yo soy Bea

=== Film ===
- 2022, Summer in Red
- 2019, El silencio de la ciudad blanca
- 2018, 70 binladens
- 2017, El guardián invisible
- 2016, Gernika
- 2015, Teresa
- 2014, Neuroworld
- 2014, Por un puñado de besos
- 2011, No habrá paz para los malvados

=== Stage ===
- 2022, King Lear, stage production at the Teatro Arriaga
- 2021, Kakerlake/Kafka, stage production at the Teatro Arriaga
- 2019/2021, Horse/Dostoevsky, stage production at the Teatro Arriaga
- 2017, Crystal Summer
- 2016, Influence of endrin in summer
- 2015, The Embrace of Herontidae
- 2014, The sadness of the snail
- 2010, The Dog Owner of Man
- 2009, The Golden Man
- 2008–09, The Fable of the Dead Princess, "Vagón de 4ª" theater company production
