= Barakaldo Theatre =

Theater in Barakaldo, Spain

Coordinates: 43.3°N 2.99°W

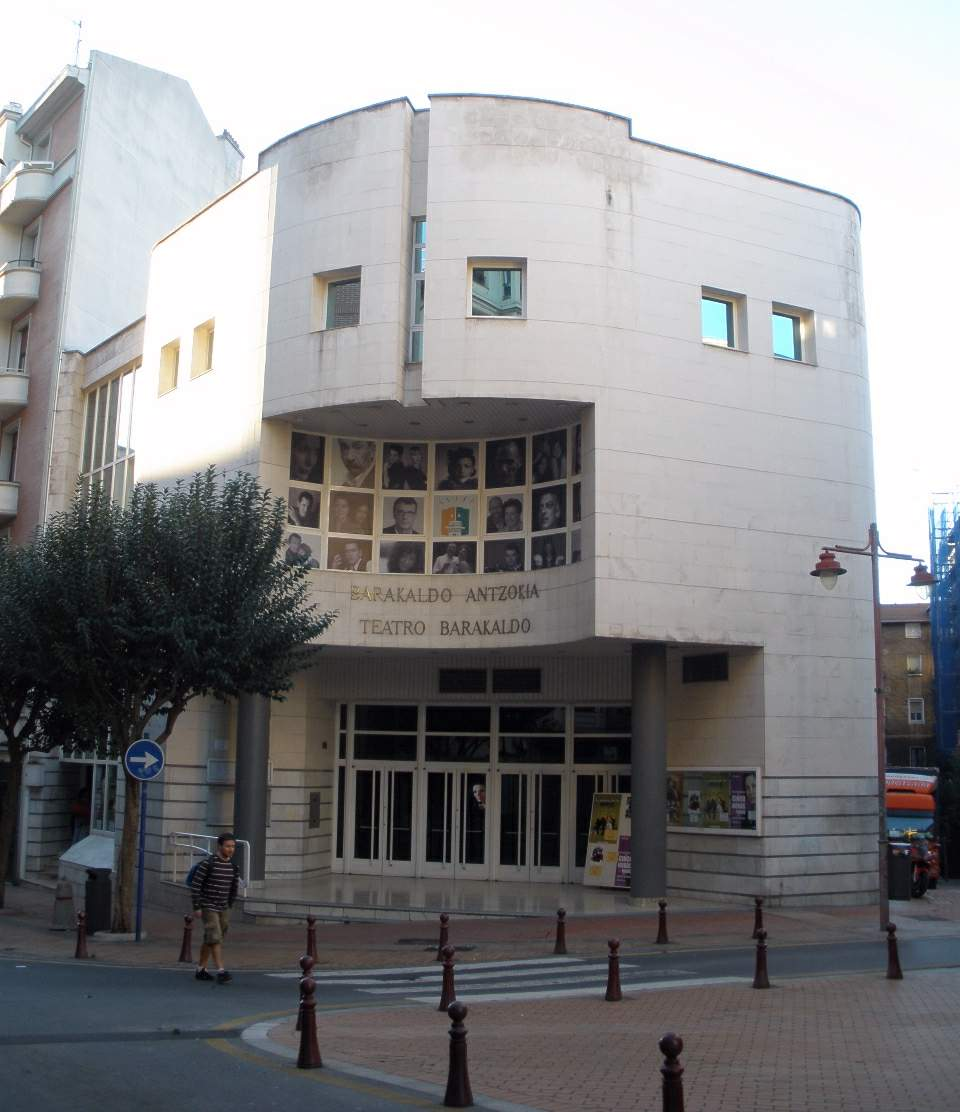
The building

The Barakaldo Theatre (Spanish: Teatro Barakaldo, Basque: Barakaldo Antzokia) in Basque is a theater in Barakaldo, Spain. It was inaugurated in 1990.

The project, presented in 1987, is the work of architect Augusto Terrero. During the decades of the 60s and 70s of the 20th century, the theater was a platform for the exhibition of the so-called independent theater.

== See also ==
- BAI Performing Arts Training Center
- Olatz Gorrotxategi
