= Goenkale =

Basque television soap-opera, 1994–2015

- Created by: Pausoka Entertainment, EITB
- Starring: Eriz Alberdi; Tessa Andonegi; Joseba Apaolaza; Pepi Aranburu; Naiara Arnedo; Aitor Borobia; Maria Cruickshank; Tanya de Roberto; Isidoro Fernandez; Ane Gabarain; Itziar Ituño; Endika Landa; Usue Martinez; Karmele Larrinaga; Gorka Nagore; Joana Ocaña; Joanes Passicot; Iñaki Perurena; Xabier Perurena; Martxelo Rubio; Maitena Salinas; Alex Tello; Maialen Urbieta
- Country of origin: Basque Country
- No. of episodes: 3,707

Production
- Running time: 1:00 (per episode)

Original release
- Network: ETB 1
- Release: 1994 – 2015

Goenkale (in English High Street) was a Basque soap-opera, produced by Pausoka Entertainment and ETB, which was broadcast every Monday and Tuesday on Basque Radio-television's first channel, ETB 1. Set in an imaginary Basque seaside town, the title of the serial is the name of the main street in that town. First broadcast in 1994, it was one of the most successful programmes of ETB 1. It ended in 2015 after 22 seasons and 3.707 episodes.

In the beginning every chapter lasted 30 minutes and they were broadcast from Monday to Friday. Then the Friday episode was removed. From 2004 two one-hour-long episodes were broadcast every Monday and Tuesday. Then thirty-minute episodes (half a normal episode) were repeated in the afternoon every day.

== Arralde ==
Arralde is the fictional seaside town where Goenkale was set. The programme was recorded at Euskal Telebista's Miramon studios and at other outside locations, mainly Orio and Tolosa. In addition, images of many Basque towns were shown, such as Mutriku, Lekeitio, Orio, Getaria and Bermeo. Next to Arralde, there is another (fictitious) town, Amaru, often mentioned by the characters of Goenkale.

The main street of the town was called Goenkale, and the scenes set on this main street were recorded at Euskal Telebista's studios, where there is an outdoor set. During the seasons it was on air, many different sets and scenarios were used, including the Boga Boga tavern, Maitiena Hotel, Bar Sobia, a txoko (gastronomic society), a videoclub, a bakery, the police station, and the houses of the characters. In total, 22 seasons of the series were recorded.

== Synopsis ==
Goenkale was launched in 1994, centred on the sour relationship between the Lasa brothers, Jose Mari, the owner of the Boga-Boga hostel-restaurant, and Martin, a shop owner. After their mother died, they found out that the will favoured one of them, and that fact ruined the relationship between the two families. The situation became unbearable and continued until the sudden death of Martin, one of the two brothers.

== Cameo appearances and anecdotes ==
Goenkale had such a great impact on Basque society, that some seasons ago, the butchers' trade association asked the producers to eliminate one of the storylines referring to a case of contaminated meat. The matter even reached the Basque parliament.

In another season, when a child was kidnapped, the TV station received hundreds of calls to say that the boy had been seen in Gernika (the child actor's home town), and complaining about the incompetence of the Ertzaintza, the Basque police, alleging that they had been following false leads.

The actress playing the character of Maria Luisa was once rebuked in public on account of her character's wickedness in the series. The actress received a letter from a male viewer in which she was warned that some other characters were lying to her. The man addressed his letter to 'Maria Luisa Galardi. Boga-Boga tavern. Arralde. Gipuzkoa.' The astute postman handling the letter added the ETB station address to the envelope, and the letter was duly delivered to the actress.

During its 22 seasons, many celebrities made special appearances in the series. Influential people in the Basque society such as the Basque chefs Juan Mari Arzak, Martin Berasategi, Pedro Subijana and Hilario Arbelaitz. ETB stars like Andoni Aizpuru, Klaudio Landa, Yolanda Alzola, Ilaski Serrano, Julio Ibarra and Josu Loroño.

Singers such as Mikel Urdangarin and Gari, the writer Pako Aristi, pelota player Mikel Goñi, football player Bittor Alkiza, rower Izortz Zabala, and the bertsolari Sebastian Lizaso also took part in some of the episodes.

The most popular cameo appearances were undoubtedly the 2004 appearances of the presidents of Real Sociedad and Athletic Club Bilbao, football teams (Jose Luis Astiazaran and Fernando Lamikiz). This had huge media attention, and both Goenkale and the two club presidents appeared in the national papers as well as on Spanish TV news.

Among the last cameo appearances were those of TV clowns Txirri, Mirri and Txiribiton, world climbing champion Patxi Usobiaga, football player Iñigo Díaz de Cerio, former Miss Spain Natalia Zabala, alpinist Edurne Pasaban, bertsolari Andoni Egaña, best seller writer Karmele Jaio and the cast of the successful TV series Go!azen.

== Well known actors in Goenkale ==
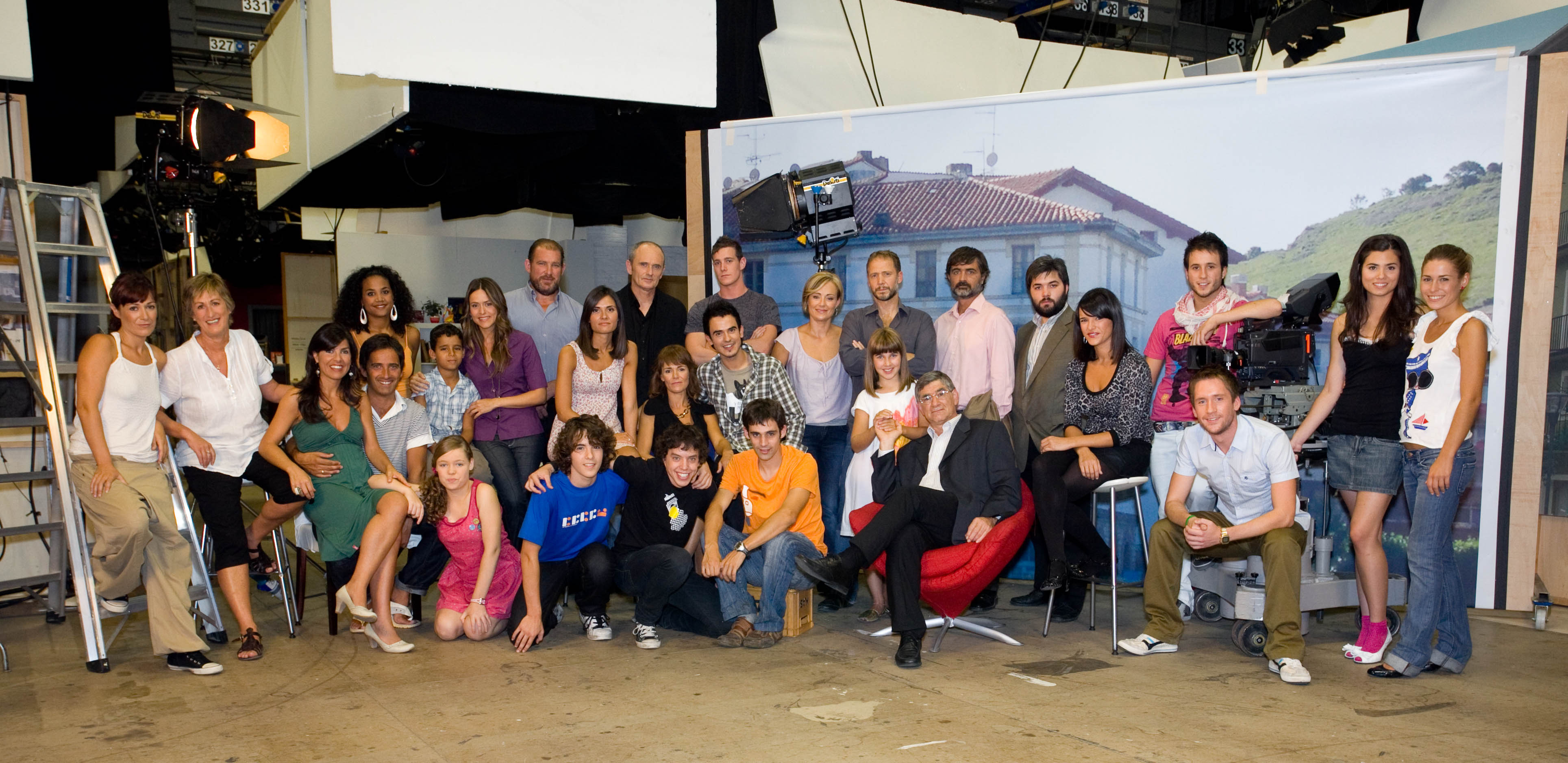
Cast members of Goenkale.

During its 22 seasons, many actors starred in Goenkale. Some of them are very well known not only in the Basque Country but also abroad. Actors such as Itziar Ituño, Barbara Goenaga, Aitor Luna, Miren Ibarguren, Jose Ramon Soroiz, Joseba Apaolaza, Veronica Moral, Ane Aseginolaza, Iñaki Beraetxe, Gorka Otxoa, Isidoro Fernandez, Iker Galartza, and Carlos N`Guema.
