= Rakel Rodríguez =

Spanish dancer, choreographer and actress

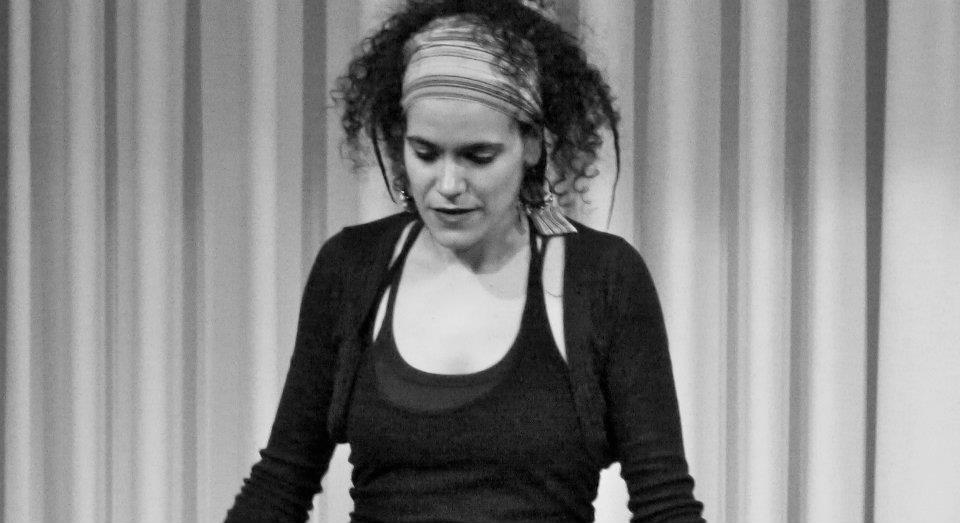
- Rakel Rodríguez
- Born: Rakel Rodríguez Ruiz; 17 October 1977 (age 48); Granada, Spain
- Citizenship: Spain
- Education: University of Granada
- Occupations: Dancer; Choreographer; Actress

Rakel Rodríguez Ruiz (born 17 October 1977, Granada, Spain) is a Spanish dancer, choreographer and actress.

She is known for creating the "sign-dance" dance style, which combines sign language with dance. She is a creator and promoter of inclusive and accessible art.

== Life and career ==
Rakel Rodríguez Ruiz was born in Granada (Andalusia). He currently resides in Bilbao. He graduated in pedagogy at the University of Granada. She also obtained the title of Higher Technician in Sign Language Interpretation and interpreter guide for deafblind people.

From a young age he was trained in guitar, dance, singing, interpretation, body expression and voice classes.

As a teenager he began to participate in social projects and has carried out cooperative work in various places and countries such as Morocco or Peru. Committed activist and involved in social causes, she has collaborated with different associative movements and entities of people with functional diversity such as the ONCE Foundation, others that work with people with rare diseases, cancer, or in defense of childhood, among which is UNICEF.

She is a pioneer in the research and teaching of interpreting courses in Sign Language in the artistic field at a European level, and she trains Sign Language interpreters in this area, in addition to teaching Signdance workshops and being a theater and dance teacher. Since 1998 she has been conducting research to merge the different sign languages with different artistic disciplines, she has participated in conferences as a speaker and has published different research articles in the university field.

She founded the dance and theater company "Arymux - Somersault Soul" which she directs. She has shared the stage with singer-songwriters, writers, musicians and artists in general such as Coque Malla, Fetén Fetén, Iñaki Uranga, El Kanka, Conchita, Mr, Kilombo, Víctor Lemes, Té Canela, Kalakan, María de la Flor, El Jose, Pepa Niebla. Quintet, Clarisse, Confluence or Yoko Ono. He has given workshops on Signdanza, art, inclusion and communication at the University of the Basque Country and other universities in Spain and Europe, the Auditorium of the Guggenheim Museum Bilbao, Artebi, Ánima Eskola, the San Telmo Museum in Donostia, the La Alameda Dance School, Arteka, Ana Rosa Tercero Dance Center, among others.

In 2016 she received the Prize for Cultural Creation from the Ramón Rubial Foundation.

In 2021 she has been selected by the Fair Saturday Foundation Forum as one of the 30 international leaders to speak on culture, innovation and social change.

In 2022, she was awarded the 2nd Edition of the Urregin Awards for Basque Theater and the Performing Arts, with the Ametsa Award for Innovation in the Performing Arts, with special mention for her involvement in favor of inclusion and equality, for take care of the gender perspective in her works and for the creation of the concepts of Signodanza and Signoarte with which she works.

== Awards and acknowledgements ==
=== Urregin Awards ===
- 2022, "Ametsa" Award for Innovation in the Performing Arts

=== Ramón Rubial Awards ===
- 2016, Cultural Creation Award
