= BAI Performing Arts Training Center =

Drama school in Bilbao, Spain

- BAI Bizkaiko Antzerki Ikastegia - Centro de Formación Escénica BAI
- Type: Drama school
- Established: 1996
- Chairman: Fer Montoya
- Principal: Fer Montoya
- Location: Bilbao, Spain
- Campus: Urban
- Website: bai-bai.net

The BAI Performing Arts Training Center or BAI Stage Training Center (Basque: BAI Bizkaiko Antzerki Ikastegia; Spanish: Centro de Formación Escénica BAI) is a drama school or drama institution in Bilbao, Spain.

Founded in 1996, it is headquartered in Barakaldo and since 2006 it also has an additional center in Bilbao.

The school has given students such as the Goya Award, Feroz Award, CEC Award and Union of Basque Actors and Actresses Award winner Urko Olazabal or the Goya Award winner María Cerezuela.

== History ==
The BAI Performing Arts Training Center was created in 1996. Since then, more than two thousand students have passed through its studies, courses, and training in interpretation, dance, and circus arts.

The BAI Performing Arts Training Center offers advanced studies in dramatic art and interpretation in four years, with the possibility of specializing in stage direction. In addition to higher studies, it also offers theater, script and directing studies. The school offers early training in performing arts (8–12 years), youth training (12–16 years), advanced youth training (16–18 years) and higher professional university training (+18 years).

In 2006, the BAI school opened an additional center in Bilbao, where it also offers training in performing arts. The BAI center also creates and promotes theatrical productions, both its own and those of others, in collaboration with different theaters such as the Barakaldo Theatre or the Arriaga Theatre.

The current director of the BAI Stage Training Center is Fer Montoya, actor and theater educator, also a professor at the Dantzerti Higher School of Dramatic Art and Dance.

Among the teachers at the school are Olatz Gorrotxategi, Joseba Lazkano, Laura Iturregi, ...

== ACT International Festival ==
In 2004 BAI created the ACT Festival, the International Festival for Emerging Performing Artists. Its aim is to achieve recognition for the work of drama schools and theater training centers, and to exchange information, methods and experiences with colleagues from other countries.

The ACT International Festival aims to promote international emerging artists who, with their innovative proposals, are defining the scene of the future. For about four days, the festival holds living arts, attending shows, courses, workshops or reflection sessions in Bilbao and Barakaldo.

== Notable alumni ==
- Olatz Gorrotxategi – (theatre director)
- Urko Olazabal – (Errementari, Ane Is Missing, Maixabel, Patria), Goya Award (2022), Feroz Award (2022), CEC Award (2022) and Union of Basque Actors and Actresses Award (2022)
- María Cerezuela – (Maixabel, Intimacy), Goya Award (2022)
- Aitor Arabiourrutia
- Leire Ormazabal

== See also ==
- RESAD
- Ánima Eskola School of Drama
- Royal Academy of Dramatic Art
- Rose Bruford College
