= Lobke van Eijk =

Dutch filmmaker, film director and producer

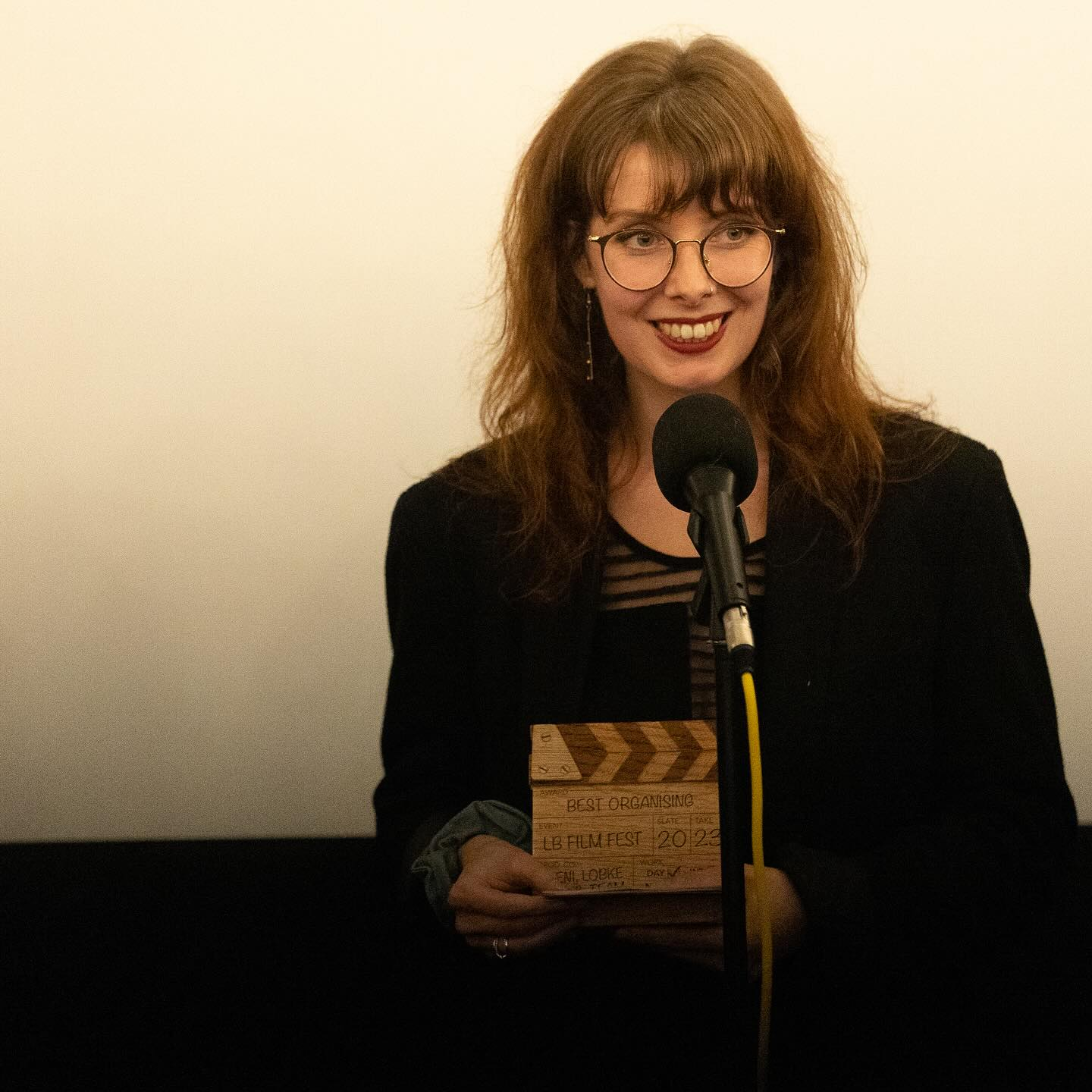
- Lobke van Eijk in 2024
- Born: Lobke van Eijk; Enkhuizen (Noord-Holland); Netherlands
- Education: HU University of Applied Sciences Utrecht (BA); University of Bradford (MA)
- Occupations: Filmmaker, film director, film producer
- Years active: 2014–present

Lobke van Eijk (born in Enhuizen in July 1994) is a Dutch filmmaker, film director and producer.

She is currently based in the UK. In addition to filmmaking, she is the current director of the Buzz Cinema Film Festival, held annually in the historic city of Leighton Buzzard (UK).

== Life and career ==
Van Eijk in 1994 in Utrecht (Netherlands). She studied a BA in Socio-Cultural Education at the HU University of Applied Sciences Utrecht of Utrecht (Netherlands). Later she got a master of arts (MA) in filmmaking at the University of Bradford (UK).

She worked in socio-cultural education workshops in Amsterdam (Netherlands), in communication area in Bilbao (Spain), as a film production assistant in Soest (Germany), as a film editor in Baarn (Netherlands) and as a film editor and as editor supervisor at Jellysmack in London (UK).

In 2015, she directed and presented Ánima Eskola Bilbao: documentary film, a documentary film on the Ánima Eskola School of Drama in which the school, its history, methodology, teachers and students were shown and the actors and teachers Marina Shimanskaya, Algis Arlauskas, David Valdelvira and Sandra Tejero were interviewed. Besides, the documentary also featured later well-known Basque actors and actresses who were studying at the school at that time, BA students of Marina Shimanskaya, among others, Carmen Climent, Nerea Elizalde or Lorea Lyons.

In 2019, van Eijk produced, directed and wrote the film Would You Rather, a film production filmed in Wales (UK). In 2021, she participated in the film The Night Takes Any Colour, directed by Melina Boukouvala, a production presented at the Chania Film Festival (CFF), an international film festival based in Chania (Greece).

In 2022, van Eijk produced, directed and wrote the film Lucidity, a film production about dementia, starring English actresses Rachel Dobell and Carly Halse. In 2023, she participated in the film A Helping Hand, directed by Joshua Francisco Mitchell, as a script supervisor.

Additionally, in 2022 van Eijk founded and promoted the Leighton Buzzard Film Festival (LB Film Fest / Buzz Cinema), whose first edition took place that same year 2022. The main objective of the film festival is to bring together creatives and filmmakers, create a space to showcase work and to celebrate and encourage creativity and collaboration between all generations. The Buzz Cinema festival is held in the historic town of Leighton Buzzard, and lasts just over a week, in which different film projects by different filmmakers are screened. It is currently in its third edition.

Van Eijk has lived in Amsterdam (Netherlands), Bilbao (Spain), Soest (Germany), Baarn (Netherlands) and London (UK). She has been based in the UK from years, where she currently lives and works. She currently resides in Leighton Buzzard (Bedfordshire).

== Filmography ==
=== Film ===
- 2023, A Helping Hand (script)
- 2022, Lucidity (production, direction and screenplay)
- 2021, The Night Takes Any Colour (production)
- 2019, Would You Rather (production, direction and screenplay)
- 2015, Ánima Eskola Bilbao: documentary film (direction and presenter works)

== See also ==
- Leighton Buzzard Film Festival
- Rachel Dobell
- Leighton Buzzard
- Marina Shimanskaya
