= La línea invisible =

- Genre: Historical drama
- Based on: an original idea by Abel García Roure
- Directed by: Mariano Barroso
- Starring: Àlex Monner; Antonio de la Torre; Anna Castillo; Enric Auquer; Patrick Criado
- Country of origin: Spain
- Original languages: Spanish; Basque
- No. of seasons: 1
- No. of episodes: 6

Production
- Running time: 45 minutes
- Production companies: Movistar+; Sentido Films; Corte y Confección de Películas

Original release
- Network: Movistar+
- Release: 8 April 2020

La línea invisible is a 2020 Spanish historical drama television miniseries directed by Mariano Barroso, and written by Michel Gaztambide and Alejandro Hernández with the collaboration of Barroso, based on an idea by Abel García Roure. It premiered in six parts on April 8, 2020 on Movistar+. The series tells the origin story of the first killing by Basque separatist organization ETA.

== Cast ==
- Àlex Monner as Txabi Etxebarrieta
- Antonio de la Torre as Melitón Manzanas
- Anna Castillo as Txiki
- Enric Auquer as José Antonio Etxebarrieta
- Patrick Criado as Txema
- Joan Amargós as Maxi
- Emilio Palacios as Peru
- Aia Kruse as Teresa
- Amaia Sagasti as Julia
- Xóan Fórneas as José Antonio Pardines
- Alba Loureiro

with the special collaboration of

- Asier Etxeandia as El inglés
- Patricia López Arnaiz as Clara
- María Morales as madre de Txabi
- Pablo Derqui as Chamorro

== Episodes ==
No.	Title	Directed by	Original release date
1	"Pintadas y petardos"	Mariano Barroso	April 8, 2020
2	"Un líder"	Mariano Barroso	April 8, 2020
3	"Tambores de guerra"	Mariano Barroso	April 8, 2020
4	"Un poeta"	Mariano Barroso	April 8, 2020
5	"La línea"	Mariano Barroso	April 8, 2020
6	"El futuro"	Mariano Barroso	April 8, 2020

== Awards and nominations ==
Year	Award	Category	Nominees	Result	Ref.
2021	8th MiM Series Awards	Best Miniseries		Nominated	
2021	8th MiM Series Awards	Best Screenplay	Michel Gaztambide and Alejandro Hernández (with the collaboration of Mariano Barroso)	Nominated	
