= Portugalete =

- Municipality
- Noble Villa de Portugalete
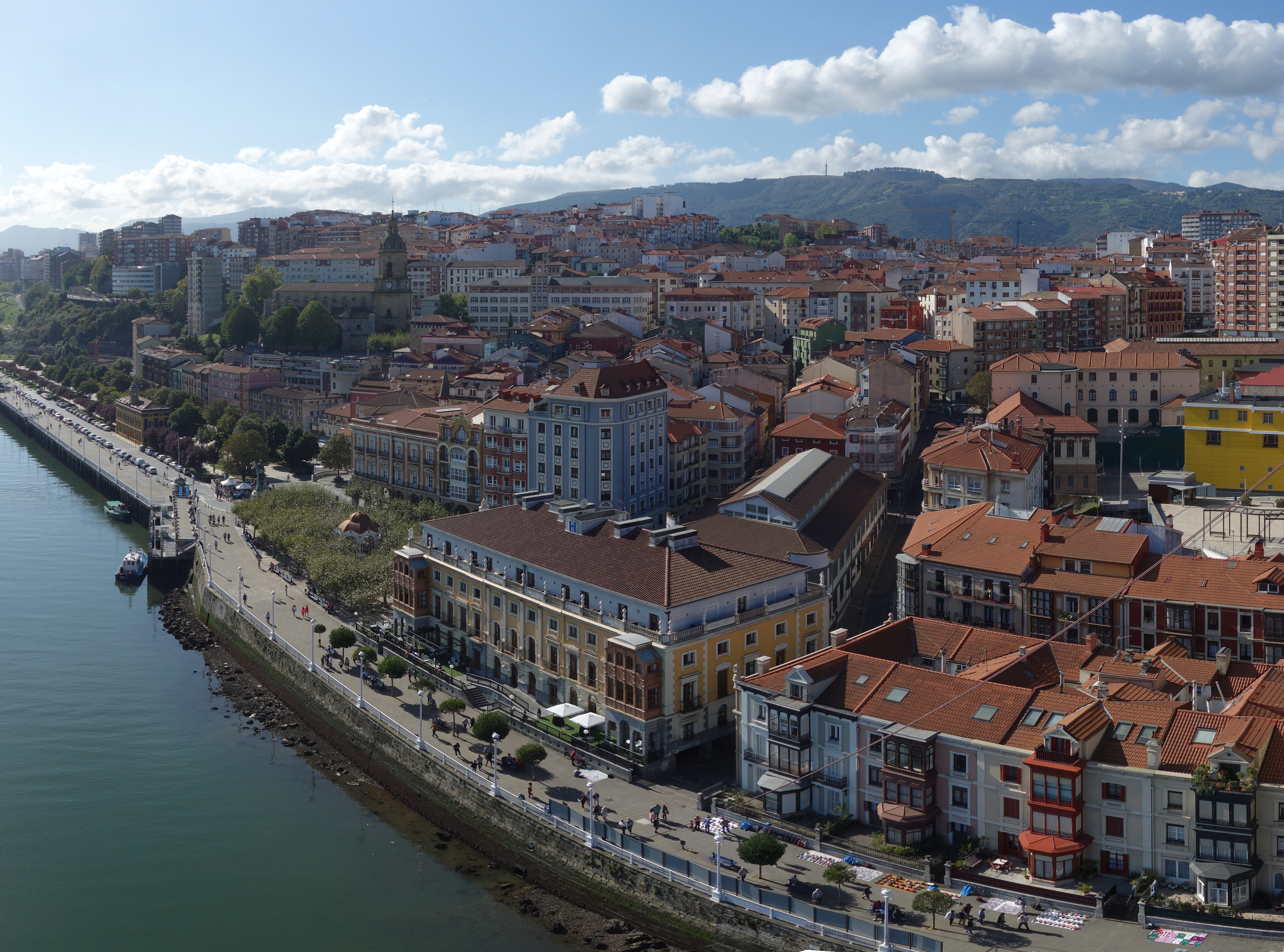
- View of Portugalete from Vizcaya Bridge

- Flag Coat of arms
- Location of Portugalete
- Coordinates: 43°19′10″N 3°1′10″W
- Country: Spain
- Autonomous community: Basque Country
- Province: Biscay
- Comarca: Greater Bilbao
- Founded: 1322

Government
  - Alcalde: Mikel Torres Lorenzo (PSE-EE)

Area
  - Total: 3.14 km^{2} (1.21 sq mi)
- Elevation: 26 m (85 ft)

Population (2025)
  - Total: 44,864
  - Density: 14,300/km^{2} (37,000/sq mi)
- Demonym(s): Portugalujo/a, Jarrillero/a, Portulano/a
- Time zone: UTC+1 (CET)
  - Summer (DST): UTC+2 (CEST)
- Postal code: 48920
- Official language(s): Basque and Spanish
- Website: Official website

Portugalete is a city and municipality west of Bilbao in the province of Biscay in the Autonomous Community of the Basque Country in northern Spain.

The city has 44,864 inhabitants and lies west of Bilbao, and as such is part of its metropolitan area. It is located at the mouth of the Estuary of Bilbao, on the left bank. Its land area is only 3.14 square kilometres (1.21 sq mi), resulting in a population density of 14,288/km^{2} (37,010/sq mi), the 8th most densely populated municipality in Spain. It was established in 1322 by María Díaz de Haro.

== Etymology ==
Despite its name, it is not near the Spanish border with Portugal and its name is not etymologically related to that country: it is derived, instead, from a phonetic adaptation of its Basque name (Portu-Ugaldeta) (edges of the port) to the Spanish language.

== Demographics ==
As of 2025, the population is 44,864, of which 47.7% are male, and 52.3% are female. Minors make up 12.6% of the population, and seniors make up 29.2%.

Historical population

Year	Pop.	±%
1842	959	—
1857	1,435	+49.6%
1877	2,476	+72.5%
1887	3,375	+36.3%
1900	4,826	+43.0%
1910	5,612	+16.3%
1920	7,898	+40.7%
1930	9,872	+25.0%
1940	10,613	+7.5%

Year	Pop.	±%
1950	11,769	+10.9%
1960	22,713	+93.0%
1970	45,803	+101.7%
1981	58,071	+26.8%
1991	55,823	−3.9%
2001	51,066	−8.5%
2011	47,698	−6.6%
2021	45,294	−5.0%

Source: INE

=== Immigration ===
As of 2025, immigrants make up 11.6% of the population. The 5 most-represented foreign countries of birth are Colombia, Morocco, Venezuela, Paraguay, and Peru.

== Festivals ==
=== San Roque Festivals ===
The festivals officially last four days, from 14 to 17 August, the main festivities occurring on 15 and 16 August, San Roque Day. The people sing the song "La Diana Portugaluja" outside the Town Hall in the morning of 15 August to mark the eve of San Roque Day.

== Monuments ==
Monuments in Portugalete include the 15th century Basílica of Santa María, Salazar's Tower and the town hall in addition to the mediaeval arches and streets in the older part of the town.

The town has the Vizcaya Bridge, a transporter bridge inaugurated in 1893. The car ferry is suspended from a frame by wires attached to wheels on tracks above the cabin and moves from one side of the River Nervión to the other (Getxo) via a traction system.

This bridge was declared a World Heritage Site in 2006.

== See also ==
- Asti-Leku Ikastola, a private school in Portugalete
- Club Portugalete, a football club based in the town
- Palacio del Marqués de Portugalete, an luxurious residence that once stood in Portugalete
- Portugalete (Bilbao Metro), the town's central metro station
