= Liz Aggiss =

British live artist, dance performer, choreographer and filmmaker

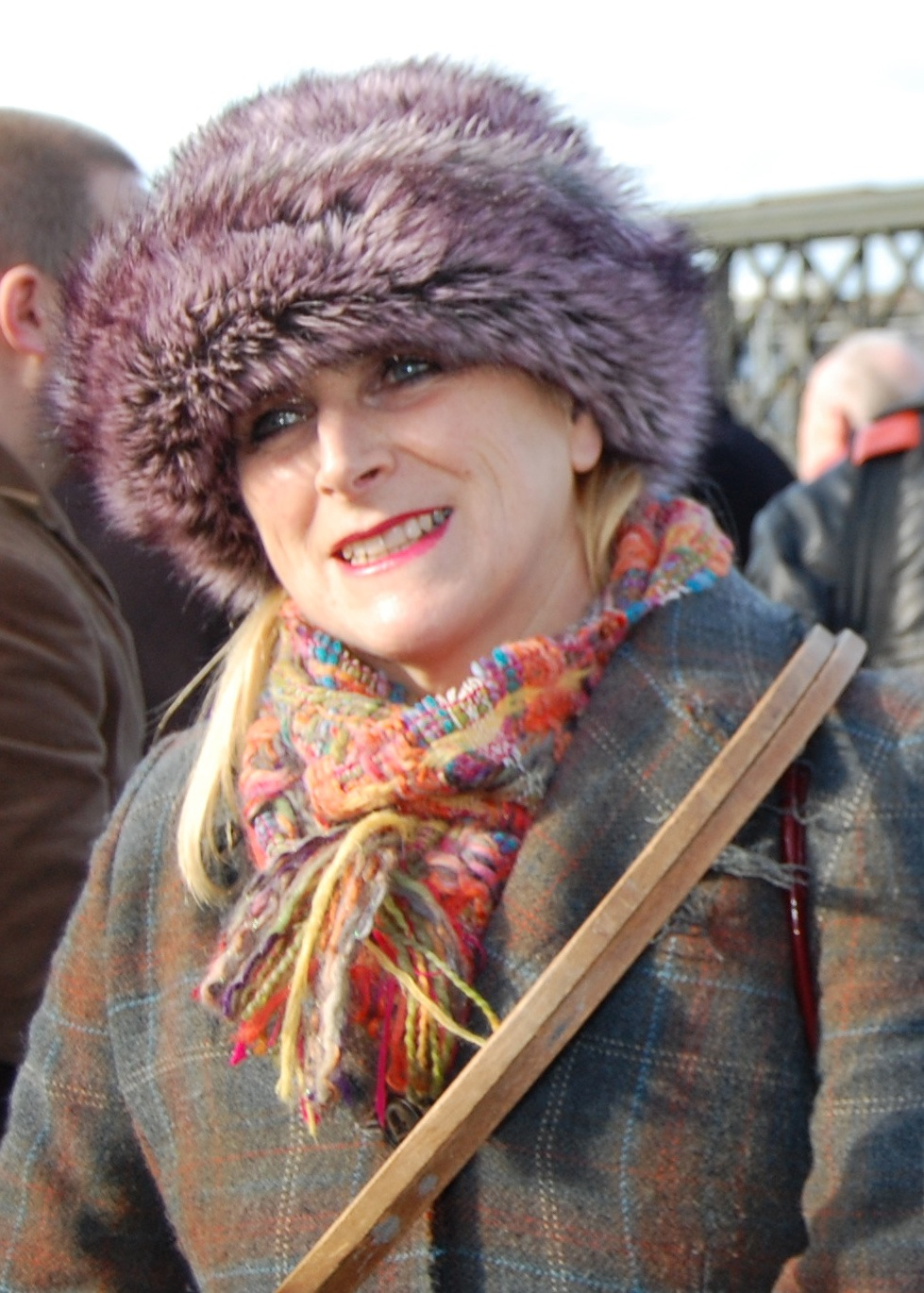
- Aggiss at the British Dance Edition festival Liverpool in February 2008
- Born: 28 May 1953 (age 73); Dagenham, England
- Occupations: Live artist, Dance performer, Choreographer, Filmmaker
- Years active: 1982 to present
- Website: www.lizaggiss.com

Liz Aggiss (born 28 May 1953) is a British live artist, dance performer, choreographer and film maker. Her work is inspired by early 20th century Ausdruckstanz (Expressionist dance), in particular the Grotesque dance of Valeska Gert, and by British Music Hall and Variety acts such as the eccentric dance performers, Max Wall and Wilson, Keppel and Betty. She is often described as the 'grand dame of anarchic dance'.

From 1982 to 2003, Aggiss collaborated with the composer, writer and choreographer, Billy Cowie, making live shows and films under the name Divas Dance Theatre. After their partnership ended, due to artistic differences, she made a series of films and solo live works, Survival Tactics for the Anarchic Dancer, The English Channel, Slap and Tickle and Crone Alone.

From her earliest works, Aggiss has challenged conventional ideas of female sexuality and beauty and questioned 'the social mores that pigeon-hole women of all ages.' She describes her later live shows as a project to 'reclaim the stage space for the older woman.'

Aggiss is Emeritus Professor in Visual Performance at the University of Brighton, where she taught for many years, and an Honorary Doctor at the Universities of Gothenburg and Chichester.

== Early years and training ==
Liz Aggiss was born in Nannygoats Commons, Dagenham, Essex and grew up in nearby Upminster, which she later described as 'a bleak English suburb during post war austerity. Where little children were seen and not heard.' Her love of music hall came from her grandmother, who used to sing to her a whole range of music hall songs: 'These were gifts. Through a kind of memory osmosis I have both fascination and knowledge of music hall....I also have a direct familial lineage to early music hall and performance in my great Auntie Flo aka Marjorie Irvine.'

Aggiss's first experience of dance was in 1970, when she studied Rudolph von Laban's modern educational dance in the UK. After a teacher training course in Keele, she 'had various jobs teaching PE teachers how to teach dance.' In 1980, she went to New York to study contemporary dance. After a summer 'studio hopping' from Graham to Cunningham to whatever else she fancied' she found the Alwin Nikolais and Murray Louis Dance Theatre Lab, where she felt she belonged. Until 1982, Aggiss trained with the Lab's lead teacher, the German expressionist Hanya Holm, in New York and in Colorado Springs. Back in the UK, Aggiss studied eccentric dance with Joan and Barry Grantham, 'possibly the last remaining living link with the early twentieth century UK Music Hall and Variety world.'

On her return to the UK in 1982, Aggiss began to teach visual performance at the University of Brighton (then Brighton Polytechnic). Here she met the Scottish composer and writer Billy Cowie, a fellow teacher. They began working together in order to get the student dancers to collaborate with the musicians. 'When the dancers didn't know how to, Liz got up and showed them. Billy directed from the sidelines.' In their book, Anarchic Dance, Aggiss and Cowie described how they worked together: 'All our work is truly collaborative....After the first few productions, whichever of us was feeling most inspired would take up the choreographic baton and run with it until we were floored by the other's barbed, critical and caustic comments. Latterly we pragmatically sliced up the works into manageable chunks and negotiated who would do which aspects of the 'steps' as we like to call them. Strangely the Yin/Yang combination of Aggiss, the 'stand up dancer' who can actually perform the movements, and Cowie the 'armchair choreographer' who can only dream them, works surprisingly well.'

== The Wild Wigglers ==
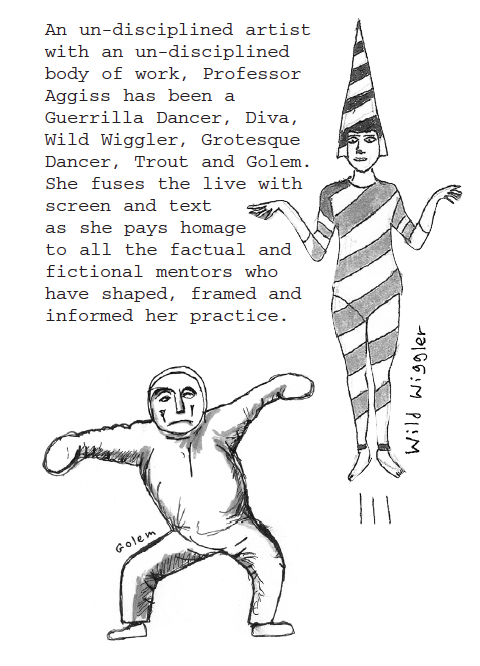
A page from the 2008 programme for Survival Tactics, illus. Peter Chrisp

In 1982, Aggiss and Cowie created The Wild Wigglers, a cabaret act inspired by the punk pogo dance, Wilson, Keppel and Betty's Sand Dance and J.H.Stead, the jumping comedian. Three dancers, wearing spiralling yellow and black leotards and tall pointy hats, performed a twenty-minute set of short visually connected dances: 'These simple animated gestures – hopping, jumping, scuttling, rummaging, blobbing, slugging – were grasped and choreographically 'worried to death' in succinct three-minute visual performance wonders'. Two Wild Wiggler dances, Weird Wiggle and Hop on Pops, can be seen on YouTube.

The Wigglers performed on the Saturday morning television show, No. 73, where they met The Stranglers, who booked them as a support act. This led to appearances in Wembley Arena, Oxford Apollo, Brighton Centre and Zenith Paris. J King in the Morning Star wondered 'whether or not all that hilarious jumping and swaying with feet tied together really qualifies as dance....It was certainly movement of a highly entertaining kind, to be remembered with gratitude by a critic so often threatened with drowning in a sea of self-indulgence, pretentiousness and insipidity.'

The original Wild Wigglers were Liz Aggiss, Ian Smith and Eva Zambicki. Later members were Jane Bassett, Neil Butler, Billy Cowie, Ralf Higgins, Simon Hedger and Patrick Lee. In 1999, Aggiss, Smith and Butler reunited to perform the act once more in Brighton's Zap club, where the Wigglers originally premiered.

== Grotesque Dancer ==
In 1986, Brighton's Zap Arts commissioned Aggiss and Cowie to create a solo piece to be performed in the single arch of the Zap Club. The work Grotesque Dancer was inspired by Aggiss's discovery of Valeska Gert, the most extreme and subversive of the German expressionist dancers. Wearing the uniform of a German gymnast, Aggiss, in a single spotlight, performed a series of short expressionist vignettes accompanied by cabaret-style songs, instrumentals and poems.

Grotesque Dancer provoked strong reactions from audiences and critics. Anne Nugent, in The Stage, wrote that the show presented a 'scenario which disgusted male critics but was greeted with warmth by women writers....Those with a theatre background derived something from it. Those with a dance background did not.' British dance critics, whose background was mostly in ballet, were unaware of the piece's roots in Ausdruckstanz, and described the work as a parody of the film Cabaret or 'a recreation of a Third Reich cabaret'. In Time Out, Alan Robertson wrote, 'Aggiss galumphs around as if she were a transvestite refugee from one of the nightclub routines in Cabaret (presumably she's being awful and gross on purpose).'

Only the German dance historian Marion Kant recognised the inspiration: 'Liz Aggiss's performance startled me...because so little work has been done to recover grotesque dances and dancers....Yet suddenly...there she was, Liz Aggiss dancing grotesque; dancing Weimar Germany...turning herself into one of those unforgettable, striking images; sharp and penetrating, affronting the senses....There she was as a grotesque dancer reincarnated, offering an eccentric mixture of offence and nonsense.'

Aggiss later said that 'the work was about redefining beauty. By the end, the front row of the audience was crying, especially the women.' At one point, she whipped off her wig to reveal a shaven head. 'Amid gasps from the audience, she heard her father shout from the back row: 'Why do you have to make yourself so ugly?"

The show was reconstructed at the Purcell Room on London's South Bank, on 9 April 1999, with live musical accompaniment from Cowie (piano) and Gerard McChrystal (saxophone).

== Divas ==
In 1986, Aggiss and Cowie created a dance company, Divas, originally all women without formal dance training. Aggiss later said, 'We were always interested in working with performers with personality. In our auditions we interviewed people to find out what they were like. That was what came out on stage. In our first performance, one dancer was pregnant. If you wore glasses normally, you wore them on stage as well.' For dancers, the Divas had what critics described as 'non-standard bodies', causing Aggiss to ask, 'But what is a standard body?'

Divas' first piece wasTorei en Vern Veta Arnold!, which premiered at the Chisenhale Dance Space London on 4 October 1986. In the show, eight dancers, in suits and high heels, used pedestrian, habitual and repetitive gestures. Looking back in 1993, Sophie Constanti described Divas as a 'crew of besuited, stiletto wearing Brighton women, whose otherwise unconventional appearance was intensified by the scowling, hard-edge non-conformity of Aggiss's brand of movement theatre.' Constanti also reviewed the show at the time: 'Jaunty, hypnotic, silently provocative and defiant, Divas are a refreshing assault on mainstream dance.'

Like Grotesque Dancer, Divas drew a hostile reaction from mainstream dance critics. John Percival in The Times, wrote, 'Liz Aggiss...has thought up a perfectly ripping wheeze of getting five of her chums...to perform in a group called Divas. They have already mastered – no that is too sexist a word for a group of young ladies – they have acquired such advanced performance skills as walking on and off stage.' Mary Clarke in The Guardian described the performers as 'determinedly ugly in dress and in movement...as untrained as they are unattractive.'

== Die Orchidee im Plastik Karton ==
In 1988, Aggiss and Cowie created Die Orchidee im Plastik Karton, premiered by 13 dance students at the West Sussex Institute of Higher Education (now University College Chichester), and later performed by Divas, at the Zap in 1989. It took the form of a German language lesson, in which gender-based phrases, spoken by a sampled female voice, revealed sexism in the language and the patriarchal nature of the culture. The phrases included 'InterCity is the train for men,' and 'The orchid in the plastic carton is the flower for ladies' Julia Pascal in her Guardian review wrote that 'Movement is staccato, grotesque and funny. Dann Geht sie Einkaufen – Hausfrau und Mutter (then she goes shopping housewife and mother) is a woman in a crab position walking backwards and forwards on palms and feet; the endless repetitive work action delivered dead pan was answered with female laughs of recognition.'

In the original student production the dancers wore the white vests and black knickers of school gym classes. In the second production, by Divas, they were dressed in red lederhosen. Parts of Die Orchidee appeared in a 1989 corporate film about Canon photocopiers, co-starring Rik Mayall in green lederhosen. In 1990, the Divas show toured to Germany, the Netherlands and Austria, where a reviewer wrote that 'Liz Aggiss, the post modern primadonna from Brighton puts her finger exactly on the nerve of the spirit of the times with her androgynous show Die Orchidee a send up of the rigid thoroughness of German bourgeois values.' The piece was reconstructed in 1999 at the Purcell Room London, with four male dancers and Aggiss, as school 'mistress', in power suit, stockings and stilettos, carrying a cane.

== Dead Steps ==
Aggiss and Cowie's first commission for another company was Dead Steps, made in 1988 for London's Extemporary Dance Theatre. This was a bridal dance performed, on the front apron of the stage, by seven androgynous brides dressed in slate grey satin, who become 'a nightmare anarchic anti-chorus line.' Allen Robertson in Time Out wrote, "Your response to the bitter, bizarre bridal dance 'Dead Steps' will depend on your tolerance for deliberately ugly cabaret pastiche with an S&M undercurrent. Alienation and humiliation are Aggiss' watchwords. Clad in metallic floor length gowns with kohl eyes, white faces and mouths like red scars, the dancers perform either in unison distortions or anti-erotic displays of the flesh. It's a sometimes fascinating, ultimately dissatisfying work, and not nearly as powerful as Aggiss's solo Grotesque Dancer."

== Carousel Dance Company ==
In 1989, Aggiss and Cowie began working with the Brighton based Carousel Dance Company (known as High Spin from 1993) in which the majority of performers had learning disabilities. They created Banda Banda, which was performed at the ICA in London in December 1989, and went on to win the 1990 Time Out/Dance Umbrella Award. Annette Stapleton described Banda Banda as 'a challenging, lively, original and entertaining performance.' Aggiss and Cowie created three more shows with the company: La Soupe (1990), The Surgeon's Waltz (2000) and Rice Rain (2001).

== Hilde Holger ==
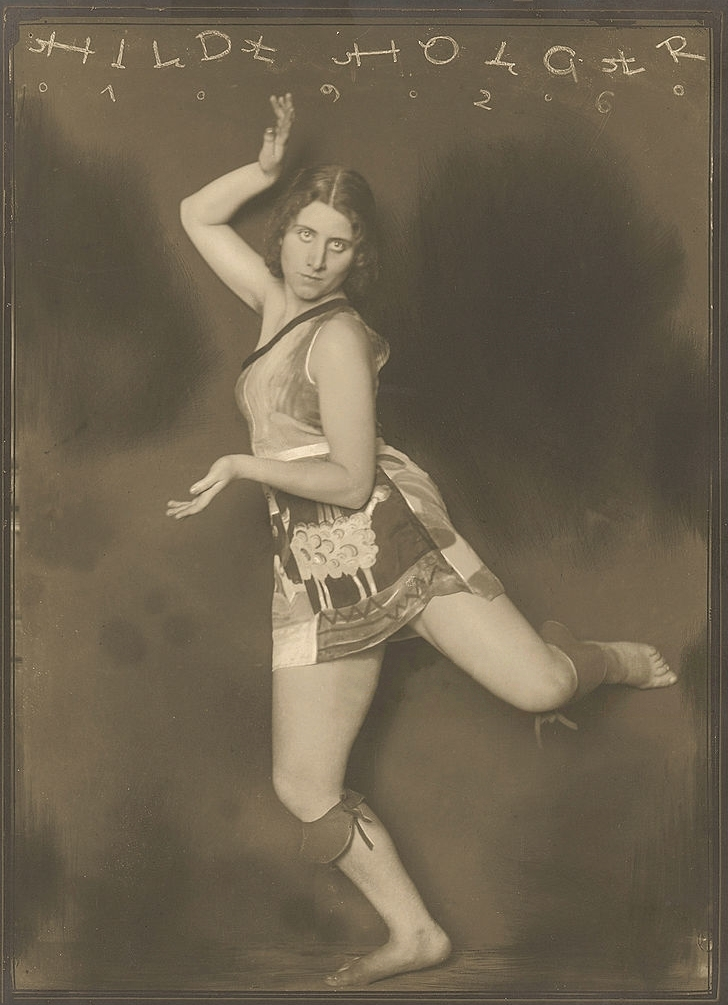
Hilde Holger in 1926

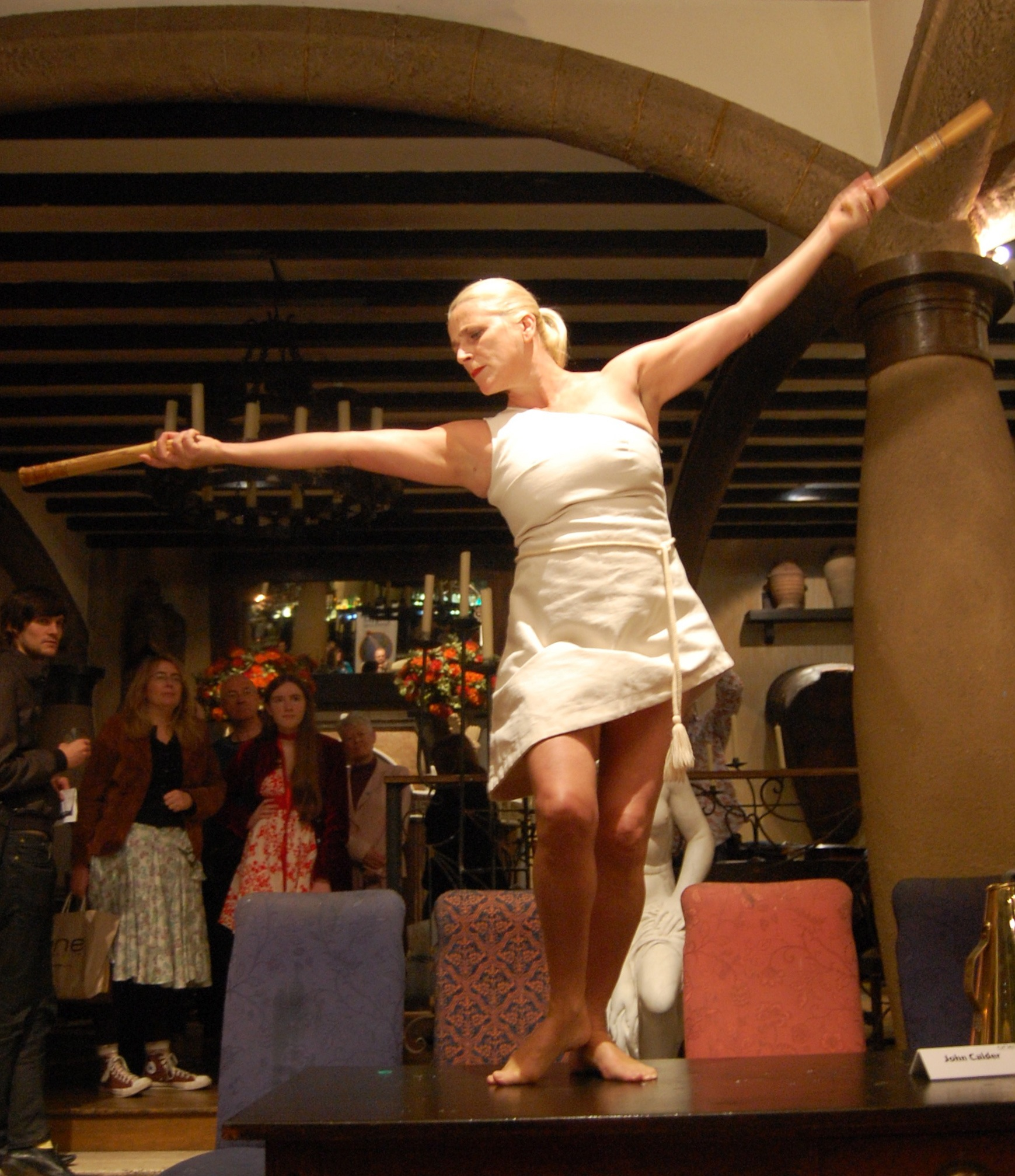
Aggiss performs Holger's 1923 dance, Le Martyre de San Sebastien, at Arta, Glasgow, in 2008

Following Grotesque Dancer Aggiss was introduced to Hilde Holger, the Viennese expressionist dancer who, then in her 80s, was still teaching dance in a Camden basement. Aggiss studied with Holger until the latter's death in 2001, and later said, 'Meeting her was like coming home.' In 1992, Holger revived four dances for Aggiss from her repertoire: Die Forelle (The Trout) (1923), Le Martyre de San Sebastien (1923), Mechaniches Ballett (1926) and Golem (1937). These were first performed, as Vier Tanze, at the Manchester Festival of Expressionism on 29 February 1992. Sophie Constanti wrote that 'Together all four pieces danced with great sensitivity and aplomb by Aggiss accompanied by Cowie on piano provided a fascinating insight into the lost Ausdruckstanz of central Europe.'

In July 1992, three days before a sold-out performance of Vier Tanze at the ICA, Aggiss broke her Achilles tendon. Her leg was in plaster for six months, and she was unable to walk properly for a further six. With her leg in plaster, Aggiss performed Cafeteria for a Sit Down Meal, at the Zap on 6 November 1992. Remaining seated throughout, she played the role of 'the world's greatest classical pianist going through his daily dysfunctional functions.' The piece had 'shades of Hilde in the choreographic vocabulary and the make-up.'

== Drool and Drivel They Care! ==
Commissioned by Zap Arts, Drool and Drivel They Care! (1990) was a satirical portrait of Margaret Thatcher, using phrases, such as 'This government keeps its promises' from her speeches and interviews. The title was from a 1987 interview with David Dimbleby, in which the Prime Minister criticised people who 'just drool and drivel they care.' Aggiss and four dancers, one male, performed as five Thatchers, dressed identically in twin-sets, pearls, handbags and wigs. For Moaning Minnes, two of the Thatchers performed en pointe a choreographed rubbish distribution and collection scheme, inspired by a Thatcher photo opportunity where she picked up litter which had been deliberately scattered before her arrival. The work premiered on 22 November 1990, the very evening Thatcher resigned. The final section was 'swiftly reworked with a wall of Maggies transforming into five John Majors still intoning relentlessly from Thatcher's speeches.' The show was then taken to France, where it was reviewed by Sylvie Sueron: 'Margaret Thatcher is minced up; her gestures, her sayings are deconstructed in self contained sections....Five dancers in strict suits and black stillettos bring to life the authentic stroboscopic qualities of a grating English prime minister.'

== Falling Apart at the Seams ==
Aggiss's 40th birthday in 1993 inspired her first work on the theme of the ageing fleshy body. Commissioned by the Gardner Arts Centre, Falling Apart at the Seams featured a duet for Aggiss and opera singer Naomi Itami. The writer/comedienne Louise Rennison co-directed and the artist Gary Goodman painted cardboard cut-out costumes and set. Billy Cowie provided the poetic text, on topics such as falling apart, dead friends, ageing and babies. Judith Mackrell in The Independent wrote, 'Gaunt faced and neurotic limbed, Aggiss parodies her own long-term fascination with the dark and grotesque. She is a woman afraid of ageing, obsessed with disintegration and pain, while Itami, smooth-skinned, practical and at ease, winds her up with some funny and often painfully personal cracks about her vanity and artistic insecurity.'

== Absurditties ==
Absurditties, first performed at the Zap in 1994, was described by Aggiss as 'stand-up dance'. She performed alone on stage without lighting, music or special effects. It was a piece 'about language about the playfulness of words....(comprising) 11 short scenes of grammatical curiosities.' The piece opened with Aggiss, in a silver minidress, saying the word 'my' 79 times in different ways. It was also a comic striptease, in which Aggiss, punning on 'bear' and 'bare', removed a series of pairs of knickers, each time revealing another pair underneath. Deborah Levy wrote that 'Cowie's extremely skilled text works with Aggiss's dynamic performing presence with complete synergy; in fact, Absurditties is a small masterpiece that resonates long after the show has finished.'

== Hi Jinx ==
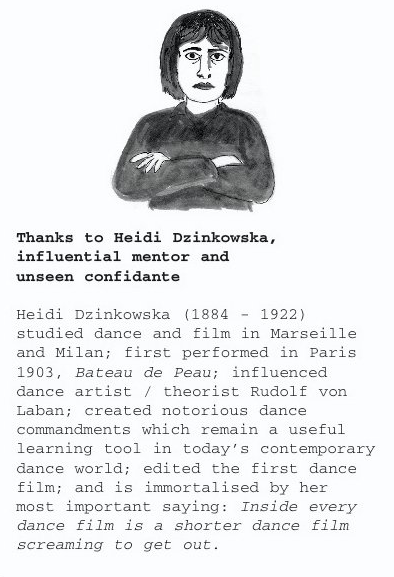
Biography of Dzinkowska from the 2008 programme for Survival Tactics, illus. Peter Chrisp

In May 1994, Aggiss won a commissioning award from the Bonnie Bird choreography fund. Aggiss and Cowie used this to create Hi Jinx (1995), a dance lecture performance about Heidi Dzinkowska, an invented choreographer, inspired by Hilde Holger.

The show comprised Aggiss's live 'reconstructions' and black and white films of dances, in which Lea Anderson played Heidi. Aggiss also read from Dzinkowska's memoir, A Life in Dance ('known as every dancer's bible'), sharing Dzinkowska's 'dance commandments', some of them direct quotations from Hilde Holger

1. Thou shalt not improvise. Keep your improvising for the bathroom.

2. Thou shalt never run around the stage in circles for no apparent reason. Nobody wishes to see that.
3. Look your audience in the eye. Dancers who only look at themselves have something to hide.
4. Thou shalt not wear leotards made from green artificial fibres.
5. On no account hurt or damage your dancers with the thrash and crash techniques.

6. Say what you have to say and then stop. If you have nothing to say don't even start.

in 2001, Aggiss performed the piece at an academic symposium on the legacy of Tanztheater at the University of Surrey. Philip Beaven, in his report on the symposium, confessed, 'It took me a while to realise that this was a beautifully fabricated parody of our desire to create icons from the past (complete with original film clips from 1904!)'

== Films ==
Aggiss and Cowie began to work in film in 1994, with Beethoven in Love, shown on BBC2, in which Aggiss played a 'granite jawed singer who is both muse and demon, seducer and tormentor to Ludwig Van (Tommy Bayley).' In 2002, they made Motion Control, shown on BBC2, Anarchic Variations which premiered at the Place in London, and Scripted to Within an Inch of Her Life, a live performance and four-screen installation deconstruction of Motion Control, which premiered at Kettles Yard, Cambridge, in 2004.

Motion Control features Aggiss in an enclosed space, where the camera moves around her. The camera moves toward the center of her body while Aggiss moves in response to it. The performance addresses themes of feminist understanding, depicting a woman with limited movement who is presented through a constructed appearance. The character displays energy and assertion throughout the piece.

Aggiss and Cowie's final collaboration was Men in the Wall (2003), a 3D film installation piece which premiered at the ICA. It comprised 'four square holes cut into a wall each containing a man – projected life size or a little bigger – of cutely exaggerated different nationalities. In over-the-top German accent Thomas Kampe rants and rails, munches on a sausage and sweetly sings. Sebastian Gonzales recalls beloved Spanish customs with tension and flair, Anglo-Asian Jeddi Bassan wimpers [sic?] and pompously prattles while American Scott Smith is casual and crumpled – a soft and sensitive post-beatnik. Changing background scenery places the men in different settings....Affected by the 3D imaging, the wall becomes a fragile, vulnerable mid-space, in which the men are locked between the viewer and the distant background scenery.'

== Anarchic Dance ==
In 2006, Routledge published Anarchic Dance, an academic retrospective of Aggiss and Cowie's twenty-five-year collaboration, which they edited with Ian Bramley. It included essays by Aggiss, Cowie, Donald Hutera, Sondra Fraleigh, Sherril Dodds, Claudia Kappenberg, Marion Kant, Valeria A.Briginshaw, Deborah Levy and Carol Brown. The essays discussed Divas' work 'in terms of feminism, hybridity, Expressionism, the "grotesque", abstraction and narrative, linguistic play and (addressed) the multiple and playful textures that define it: sound, space, shape, language.' The book also included a DVD of their works.

== Guerilla Dances ==
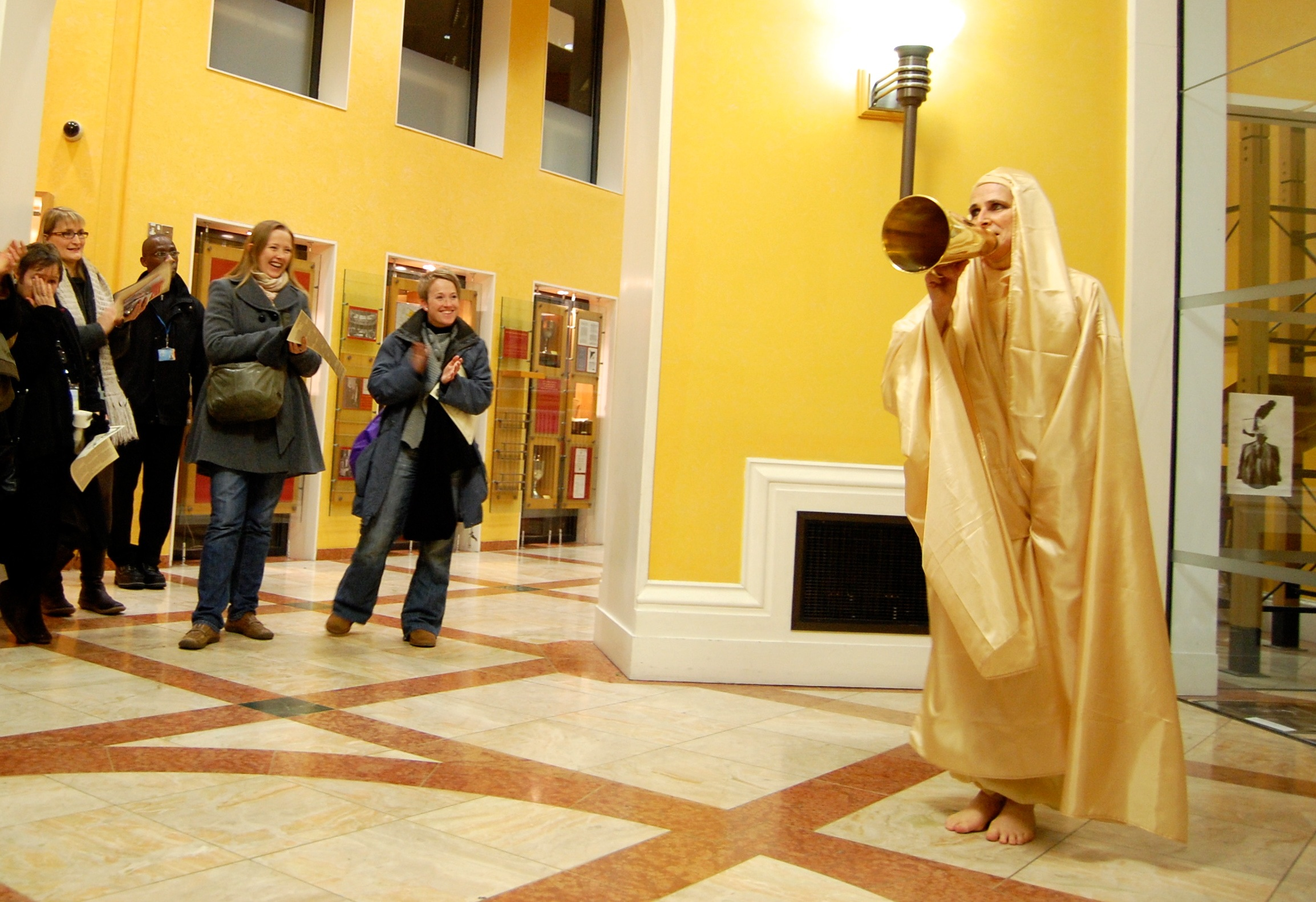
Aggiss announces her guerilla dance performance of 'Joi-te-Je' by Isi-te-Jeu at LIPA on 2 February 2008

Aggiss's first solo work following the split with Cowie was Guerilla Dances, performed in 2008-9 at dance festivals. This was a set of 18 short sharp dance 'reconstructions' of European Ausdruckstanz solo performances from between 1917 – 1945. Artists reconstructed included Hilde Holger, Mary Wigman, Valeska Gert, Dore Hoyer, Bronislava Nijinska and Isi-te-Jeu. Some of the dances, such as Hilde Holger's were genuine reconstructions, while others mixed fact with fiction, or were wholly invented. For Mary Wigman's 1920 Lament for the Dead No.2, Aggiss, wearing a long black gown, slowly revolved to reveal her bare buttocks.

Aggiss performed Guerilla Dances as pop-up pieces at festivals, including the British Dance Edition Liverpool, Glasgow Merchant City Festival and Loikka Dance Film Festival, Helsinki, Finland. Carrying a megaphone and a beatbox, Aggiss would make a surprise appearance in front of the audience for another dance piece. Jana Návratová, the Czech dance critic, described the impact: 'During the interval or before the performance, when people usually shift in their seats switching off cells and finishing sandwiches, she stepped onto the scene and speaking through a megaphone claimed our attention. As we calmed down, each time more eagerly, she rewarded us with short cartoon sketches from the history of dance....We could see only a few scraps from this treasure but there is no doubt that this Vivienne Westwood of dance is a living jewel of the United Kingdom.'

== Diva and Beach Party Animal ==
Aggiss continued to make films, now working with the filmmaker Joe Murray. Their first film was Diva (2009), in which Aggiss played a jaded diva, performing a reconstruction of a 1927 dance in St Nicholas's churchyard, Brighton. it was shown on Channel 4 in the UK, ArteTV in France and Germany, and ABC in Australia.

In 2011, Aggiss and Murray made Beach Party Animal, combining footage of real Brighton beach life with staged Guerilla style interventions. Dorothy Max Prior in Total Theatre described the film as 'a very artful and cunning mix of staged set-pieces and real-life action, so deftly edited that unless you are in the know and spot the performers, it is hard to distinguish the plants from the real-live city folk.... in tandem with Joe Murray, she moves away from Expressionism into a crisper and sharper Hyperrealism. Aggiss and Murray apparently spent many, many weeks filming on Brighton beach at all hours of the day and night. Hours and hours of footage are distilled down into a 20-minute film that is an homage to the city that never sleeps (unless it's face down on a sodden handbag, or comatose and sun-bleached like a beached whale on the pebbles).'

Dorothy Max Prior, in a 2017 interview with Aggiss, looked at the connection between her film and live work: 'Whether live or on film, creating moving pictures is at the heart of the work. Big, bold pictures. 'I don't have an ounce of lyricism in me' she says, explaining why she turned to kohl-eyed, grotesquely-costumed Expressionism at a time (the 1980s) when most other contemporary dancers were dressed in grey sweatpants and exploring Somatic Practice or Contact Improvisation. 'I've always hated jumping and rolling on the floor' she says 'I like the jarring, the angular, the distorted...I like to make a stop-frame animation live performance.'

== Survival Tactics ==
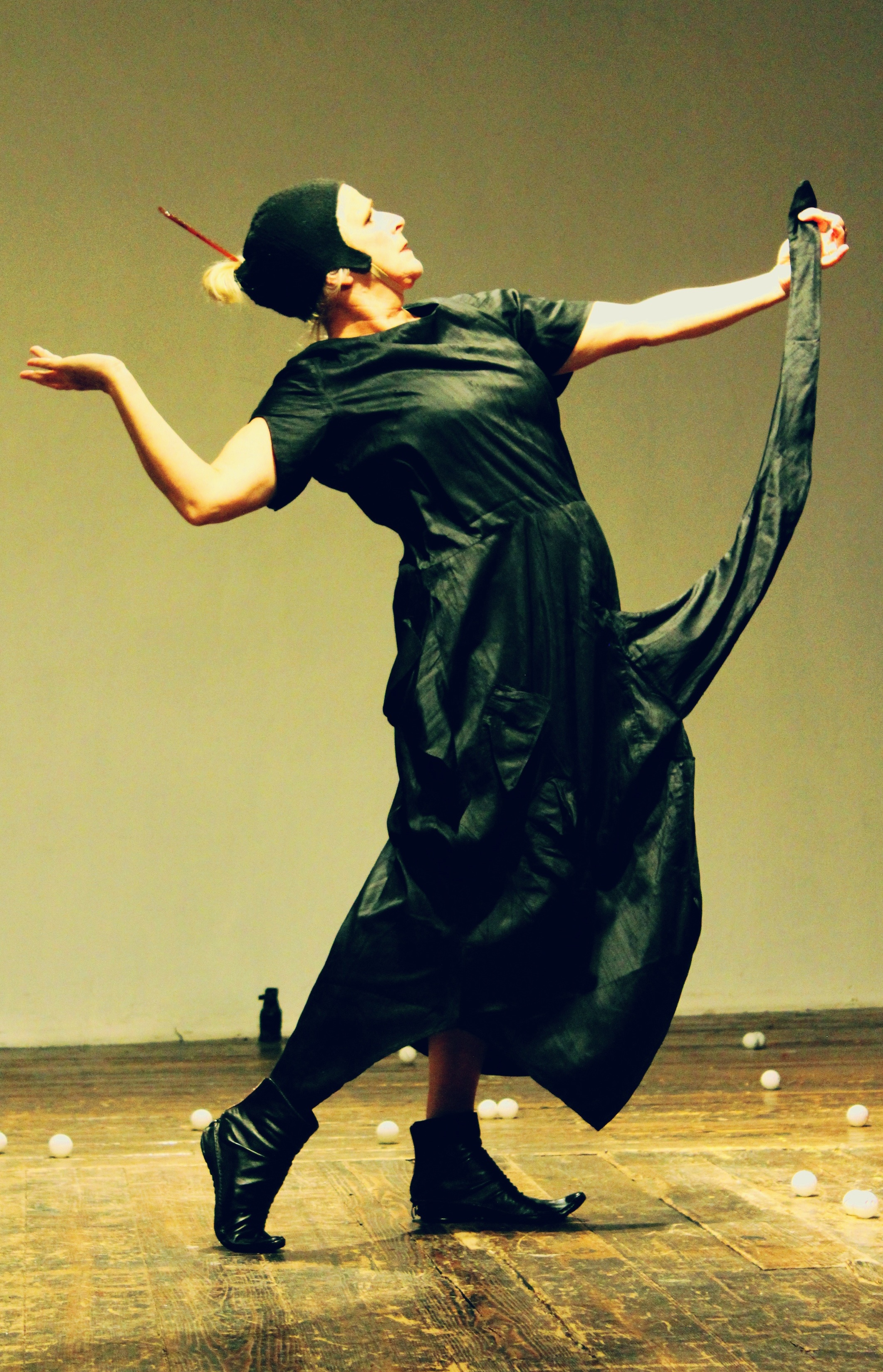
Aggiss performs Survival Tactics during the 2013 Dublin Live Art Festival

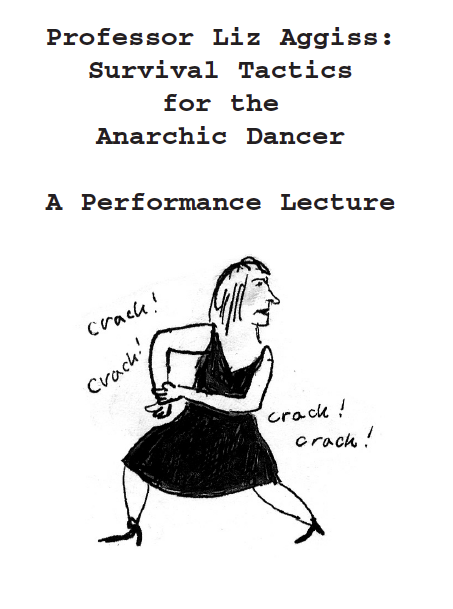
Souvenir programme for Survival Tactics, illus. Peter Chrisp

Aggiss returned to the stage in 2010 with a full length performance lecture, Survival Tactics, originally called Survival Tactics for the Anarchic Dancer. In 'a refreshingly unabashed 'this is my life' she paid homage to herself and to her factual and fictional mentors, from Max Wall to Marjorie Irvine. The lecture brought together her Guerilla dances with earlier works, including Heidi Djinkowska's dance commandments from Hi Jinx and the 'my my' section of Absurditties. Mary Brennan reviewed a performance at the National Review of Live Art: 'Liz Aggiss wowed us with her Survival Tactics, a bravura volley of agile mischief with ideas and limbs flying in brilliantly ridiculous directions.'

In a 2018 interview, Aggiss described her motivation for making new stage shows: 'I'd been making a lot of films and then I thought, I want to go back on the stage. I want to be the visible older woman. I want to reclaim the stage space for the older woman.'

== The English Channel ==
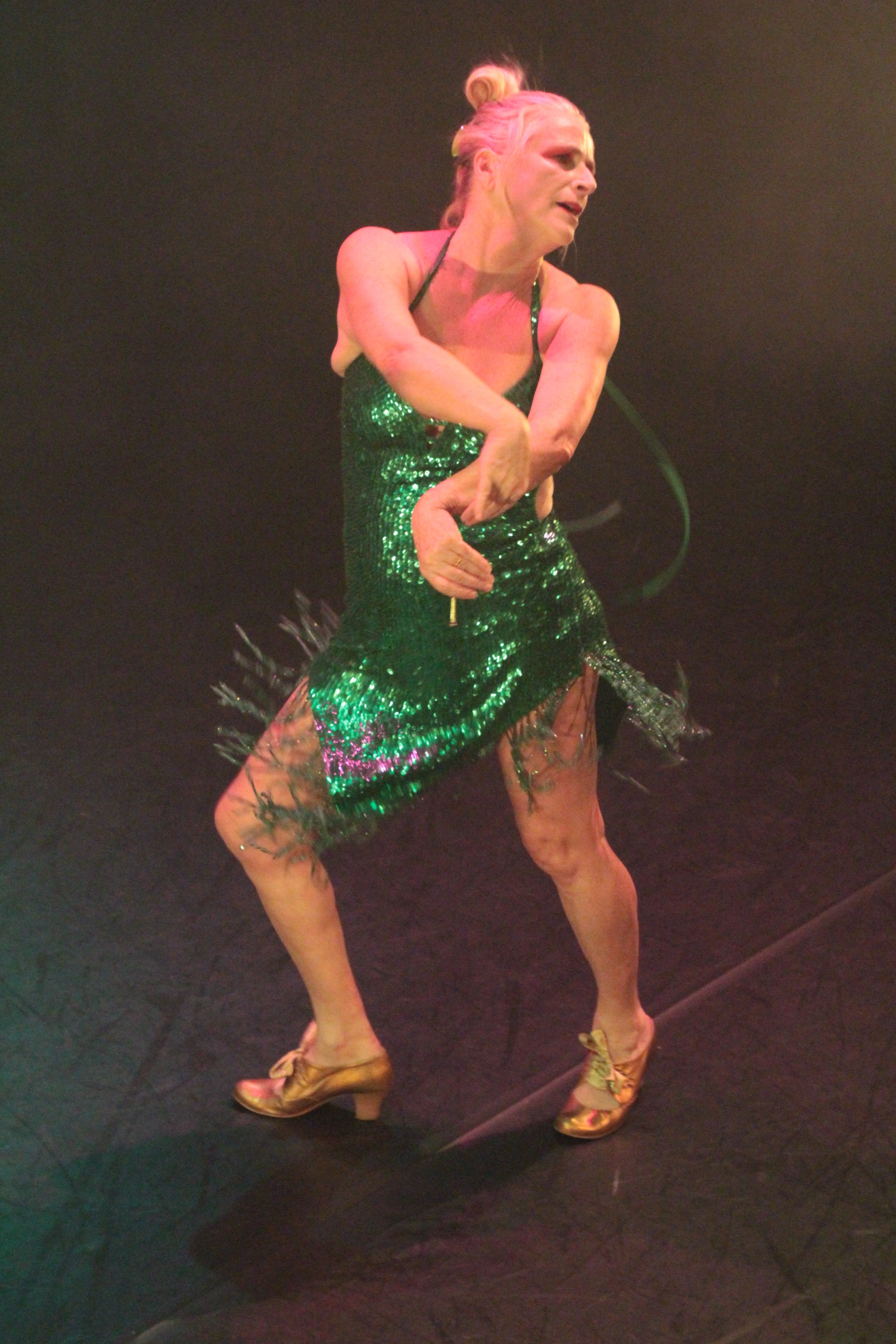
Aggiss performs The English Channel at Liverpool Hope University, 20 November 2015

Aggiss's next stage show, The English Channel was a reflection on mortality, created in 2013 in response to reaching the age of 60. It opened with Aggiss 'shrouded in a black cape and dancing with a skull perched atop her head....The skull, cradled like a baby and placed gently onstage, becomes witness to everything that follows.'

As the English Channel, Aggiss presented herself as a medium 'conjuring the ghosts of dance past, present and future, who all remind us that death is just around the corner.' The ghosts summoned were Kurt Jooss, Robin Hood and his Merry Men, Claire Waldoff, Gertrude Ederle, Florence Foster Jenkins, Kay Lynn, Max Miller, Max Wall, Lily Morris and Isi Te Jeu.

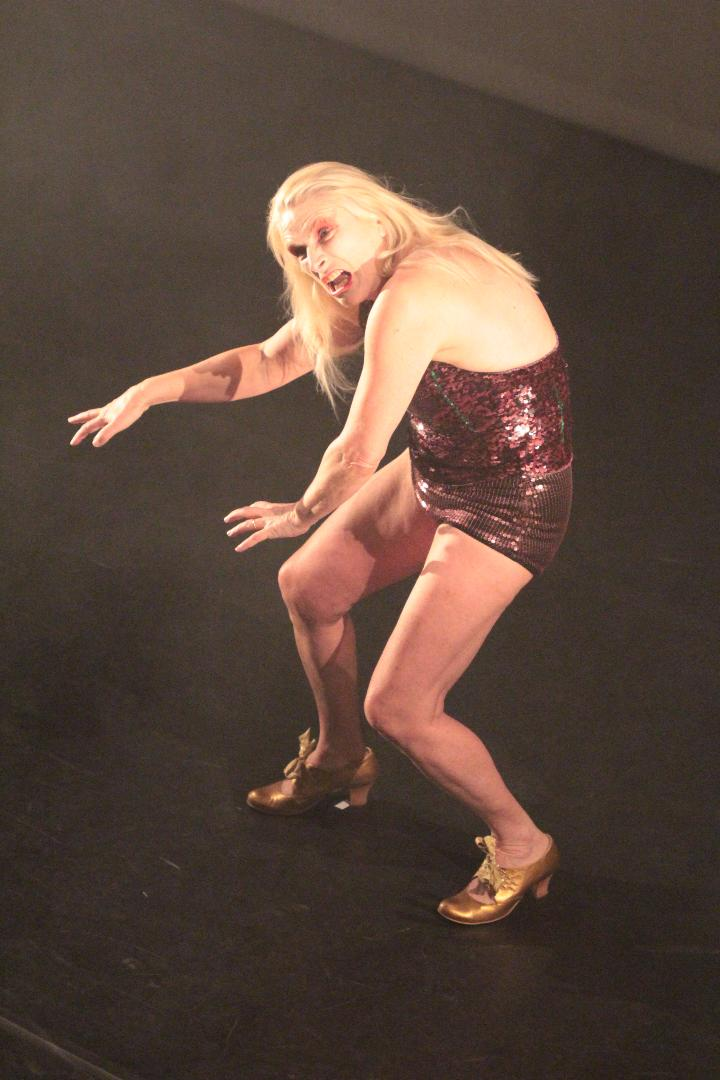
Aggiss performs The English Channel in Liverpool, 20 November 2015

Aggiss's live performance was framed by Joe Murray's archive and contemporary films, in which Lisa Wolfe impersonated Claire Waldoff, Emma Kilbey performed as Florence Foster Jenkins and Antonia Gove danced as Isi Te Jeu. The score by Alan Boorman of Wevie, wove 'together his own quirky compositions with a whole raft of found sound, classical piano...and pop classics.' There were live musical numbers, in which Aggiss reframed 'The Dead Kennedys' best-known song into a jazzy number about rolling into bed too tired to copulate, and another about the pleasures of the female orgasm.' At the end, the whole audience was invited onstage for 'a jolly Essex knees up'.

In her review, Dorothy Max Prior described the show as 'a marriage of choreography and scenography. Live art. Moving sculpture....Clothing isn't merely decorative, it changes the body's movement, it informs the choreography. Often, the performer's body is deconstructed or distorted or extended by what she is wearing: a black penitent's shroud covers her head, but exposes her legs, making her look like a mini-skirted Ku Klux Klan member; an enormous metal claw with excessively long fingers weaves through the air, both menacing and mesmeric (referencing Kay Lynn's Finger Dance); her Max Wall bulging bottom channels the Bouffon, looking down at the world and laughing. At times, she seems to be almost puppeteering herself in a complex animation of body and object or clothing.' The costumes were made by Holly Murray, who has worked on every Aggiss show since 2000.

Aggiss toured widely with The English Channel, performing around Britain and also in Ireland, Sweden, France, Spain, Germany, Russia, China and Tasmania.

== Slap and Tickle ==
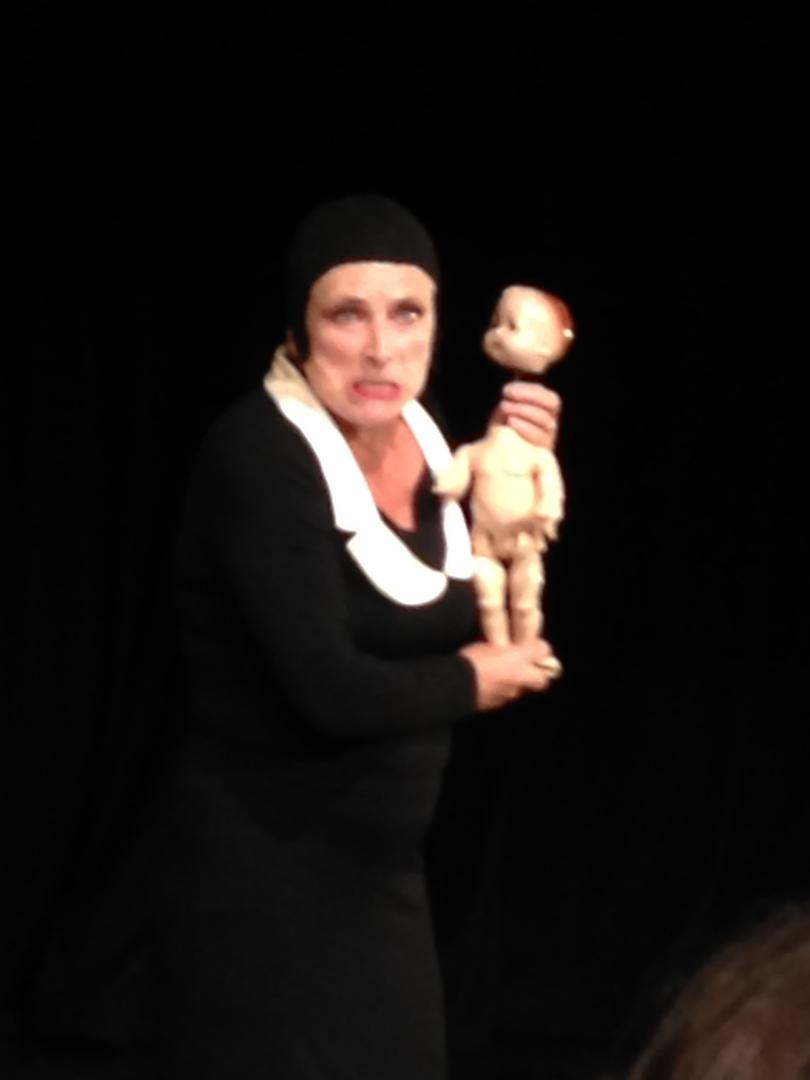
Aggiss performs an early version of Slap and Tickle at the Steakhouse Live Festival in 2014

Aggiss followed The English Channel in 2016 with Slap and Tickle, a dark and disturbing piece on the forces that shape and constrain female lives, from childhood to old age. In an interview she described it as 'a show of opposites; slap and tickle, punishment reward, push and pull' Aggiss alternately 'slapped' the audience, taking them into dark areas, and then 'tickled' them with comic material ('Come on everybody! Let's have a party!')

Slap and Tickle was structured in three acts, 'using a visual and aural collage of movement, text, props, costumes (Holly Murray), sound (Joe Murray) and cover versions (Alan Boorman/Wevie)'. The first act explored the world of the girl-child and 'the insidious nature of the fairy tales and nursery rhymes than reify societal mores'. Referencing Cinderella, Aggiss wore silver slippers and a gorgeous old-gold party dress.' The second act, on the adult woman, began with her wearing 'a chic New Vogue black-and-white dress, striking high fashion poses' and ended with 'a genuinely disturbing turn with a misshapen puppet, which Aggiss dangles from a noose over her shoulder as she describes the journey of a woman who experiences pregnancy, abortion, childbirth and bad motherhood.' The third act, on the older woman, ended with her 'crawling on all fours to 'Smack My Bitch Up', bare-arsed with a pony tail waving over her bum, a faint sly smile playing over her lips.'. Dorothy Max Prior described the ending as 'a fabulous moment of emancipation and celebration of the older female body.'

The three parts were interspersed with audience games of pass-the-parcel and balloon twisting, overseen by the voice of a 1950s BBC Listen with Mother radio announcer, voiced by Emma Kilbey.

Laura Irvine called Slap and Tickle 'a wilfully raucous, often unnerving meditation on the reductive labels that limit the development and growth of girls. It's also an impassioned plea for visibility, a space for recognising the sexuality and agency of older women.'. Mary Brennan described it as a 'glorious broadside against the social mores that pigeon-hole women of all ages....The hilarious tickle never undermines the serious slap in this solo.'. For Lyn Gardner, the show was a 'pointed and bawdily funny exploration of what it means to refuse to act your age' Sarah Kent argued that the piece was 'more personal, more pertinent and far more potent' than The English Channel.

Slap and Tickle toured internationally, and won the 2017 Total Theatre award at the Edinburgh Fringe.

== Crone Alone ==
In 2019, Aggiss began to develop a new solo stage show, Crone Alone, which she originally planned as 'a layered, unapologetic feminist solo that dissects the historical medical precedents, associated with female hysteria. Symptoms included: 'wandering wombs'; a 'tendency to cause trouble'; a 'gathering in the head'; 'egotism' and 'novel reading'.'

Due to the COVID-19 pandemic, the project was delayed until 2022. On her website, Aggiss said that she had now 'decided to reinvent herself as a performance poet whilst embracing her inner crone as the ideal incarnation of herself, unruly, wise, fearsome, and just a bit gobby.'

Aggiss performed a short extract of the work in progress on 17 June 2022, opening Sadler's Wells Elixir Festival, a season of performances 'celebrating the artistry of the older dancer.' In SeeingDance, Matthew Paluch wrote: 'Aggiss offers spoken word verging on rap, balletic interludes and jerky movement phrases, all encompassed within a very long, drawn-out strip tease of sorts. She ends up in a blonde wig à la Marie-Antoinette via Uranus, and a flesh-tone leotard with (artificial) nipples, pubic hair and labia on display. You can't take your eyes off her though. She's charismatic to the point of perplexing....Her genius is herself though. What she offers is so genuine. Her show could work anywhere as she is the show. She seemed to be sharing her perception of the way she's been, or is being, perceived. It felt personal, purposeful and profound.'

Sanjoy Roy in the Guardian wrote: 'Opening its first evening was Liz Aggiss, dubbed the "enfant terrible of the bus pass generation" in the programme note, whose inimitable presence – equal parts Weimar cabaret host, dada dancer, rogue feminist and end-of-pier prankster – feels as fresh now as it did when she started out four decades ago. Her short solo Crone Alone is, as she repeatedly points out during the performance, definitely and defiantly not pretty. She peels off her coat – a kind of shiny all-body bin-bag – to reveal a scuzzy vest and bulging Y-fronts. She peels those off too, revealing successive layers of vests and undies that release various abject objects....In between, she recalls critical reactions to her early shows, cranks her limbs into puppetty jerks, rants and raps to club and rock rhythms, air-guitars her fingers in front of her crotch. Peel away your lifelong accretions of self and society, she seems to say, and you find fights and philosophising, you find odours, body hair and saggy skin, and you find a hot, sweaty soul that is not pretty, but is punchy – and a force of life.'

Aggiss gave her first public performance of Crone Alone on 29 November 2025 at the Tute in Cambois, Northumberland, as part of its Rude Health festival. Lisa Wolfe described the premiere in an article about the Tute for Total Theatre: "With its intricately constructed mix of music-hall tropes, personal revelations, elegantly wrought choreography, and wondrous costume reveals, Crone Alone astounds and delights this rookie audience."

== Commissions ==
Alongside her own shows, Aggiss has written, choreographed and directed work for other companies. In 2008, she made Don't Put Your Daughter on the Stage for MapDance, the University of Chichester's student company. It featured a chorus line-up of dancers and paid 'homage to early twentieth-century dance in its styling and aesthetic...maintaining the syncopation of a classic showgirl line-up.'

Aggiss's second work for MapDance, Cut with the Kitchen Knife (2014), referenced the photomontages of Hannah Höch, the stop frame animations of Edweard Muybridge, Gertrud Bodenwieser's Demon Machine, and the 1933 Hollywood musical Roman Scandals. Aggiss described the show: 'A troupe of oddball performers is hell-bent on recovering bodies from the library....This performance pays homage to past dance artists of the past, drags them into the present and reflects on the challenges still facing contemporary dance audiences.'

In 2016, Aggiss made a third show for MapDance, History Repeating..., which reconstructed Bounce Dance from Grotesque Dancer, Hilde Holger's Die Forelle (The Trout) and Wilson Keppel and Betty's Sand Dance.

For Nora Invites (Eleanor Sikorski and Flora Wellesley Wesley), in 2014, Aggiss created Bloody Nora! which Sarah Veale described as 'a smart and searing send-up of the infuriating 'Is it that time of the month?' questions so often levied at women who dare express an impassioned opinion.'

Head in My Bag (2019) was a commission for Dance Six-O, the elder performance company. It was a piece which 'dumps age centre stage and kicks preconceptions into the long grass....Her performers, with handbags on their heads, become a radical army of spirited individuals calling for the overturn of institutional myopia.'

MADE TO LAST (2019), another commission for older dancers, was created for the Mature Artists Dance Experience (MADE) of Hobart, Tasmania. Reviewing the first performance, Lesley Graham wrote, "Flossing and farting along with mysteriously moving curtains are par for the course. As the performers taunt: 'We are watching you watching us, so watch out!'....Seriously funny, and verging on anarchic, this work shows that growing older doesn't have to be graceful, and is an extension of lives being well lived." The show, postponed for four years due to Covid, was restaged by Aggiss at the Theatre Royal Tasmania in 2023.

== Teaching ==
From 1982 to 2000, Aggiss taught visual performance at the University of Brighton. The course produced several 'fascinating independent artists', including Ian Smith, Louise Rennison, Ralf D'Arcy Higgins, Virginia Farman, Marisa Carnesky and Miriam King, who all performed in Aggiss and Cowie's shows, and Anne Seagrave, Lizzy Le Quesne, Silke Mansholt, Michael Pinsky, Nikki Ward, Esther Rollinson, Miranda Henderson, Marc Rees, George Chakravarthi, Chris Umney and Magali Charrier. After 2000, she switched to research at the same institution. Yet she continues to teach, offering 'Mistress classes, workshops and residencies.'

== Works ==
Year	Title	Form	Cast
1982-90	The Wild Wigglers	Cabaret act	Liz Aggiss, Jane Bassett, Neil Butler, Billy Cowie, Ralf Higgins, Simon Hedger, Patrick Lee, Ian Smith, Eva Zambicki
1986	Grotesque Dancer	Stage show	Liz Aggiss
	Torei en Varan Veta Arnold!	Stage show	Rachel Chaplin, Ellie Curtis, Virginia Farman, Kim Glass, Kay Lynn, Amanda Tuke, Louise Rennison, Jeanne Ayling
	Dva Sa Momimomuvali	Stage show	Rachel Chaplin, Ellie Curtis, Virginia Farman, Kim Glass, Kay Lynn, Amanda Tuke
1988	Eleven Executions	Stage show	Liz Aggiss, Maria Burton, Rachel Chaplin, Ellie Curtis, Virginia Farman, Kay Lynn, Sian Thomas
	Dead Steps	Stage show (commission for Extemporary Dance Theatre)	Scott Ambler, Kaye Brown, Sarah Barron, Lindsay Butcher, Chantel Donaldson, Madeleine Ridgaway, David Waring
1989	Stations of the Angry	Stage show	Liz Aggiss
	Dorothy and Klaus	Stage show	Liz Aggiss, Jane Bassett, Maria Burton, Ellie Curtis, Virginia Farman, Sian Thomas, Ralf Higgins, Barnaby O'Rourke
	Die Orchidee in Plastik Karton	Stage show	Liz Aggiss, Jane Bassett, Maria Burton, Marisa Carnesky, Ellie Curtis, Virginia Farman, Ralf Higgins, Barnaby O'Rourke, Sian Thomas, Fiona Wright; Reconstruction cast: Aggiss, Adrian Court, Sebastian Gonzales, Stephen Kirkham, Ralf Higgins
	Banda Banda	Stage show by Carousel	Joyce Francis, Eric Grantham, Edna Guy, Debbie Hartin, Sarah Jackson, Martin Lake, Veronica Lee, Jac Matthews, Clare Matthews, Alison Mills, Colin Richardson, Valerie Rowe, Margaret Stamp, Gill Wilcox
1990	La Soupe	Stage collaboration of Divas with Carousel	Divas: Liz Aggiss, Jane Bassett, Virginia Farman, Ralf Higgins, Parmjit Pammi; Carousel: Joyce Francis, Eric Grantham, Edna Guy, Jane Hanson, Debbie Hartin, Sarah Jackson, Martin Lake, Veronica Lee, Jac Matthews, Clare Matthews, Alison Mills, Colin Richardson, Valerie Rowe, Margaret Stamp, Gill Wilcox
	La Petite Soupe	Stage collaboration of Divas with Carousel	Liz Aggiss, Jane Bassett, Virginia Farman, Edna Guy, Martin Lake, Ralf Higgins, Sian Thomas, Fiona Wright, Parmjit Pammi
	Drool and Drivel They Care	Stage show	Liz Aggiss, Jane Bassett, Ralf Higgins, Sian Thomas
1991	French Songs	Stage show	Tommy Bayley, Maria Burton; Live music: Billy Cowie (piano), Cathryn Robson (voice), Lucie Robson (voice), Anne Stephenson (violin), Sian Bell (cello)
1992	Vier Tanze	Stage reconstruction of Hilde Holger dances	Liz Aggiss
	El Punal en el Corazon	Stage show	Liz Aggiss, Daphne Scott-Sawyer; Live music from Billy Cowie (accordion), Deborah Hay (guitar) Lucy East (cello)
	Cafeteria for a Sit-Down Meal	Stage show	Liz Aggiss, Jeddi Bassan
1993	Falling Apart at the Seams (so it seems)	Stage show	Liz Aggiss, Naomi Itami
	No Man's Land	Stage show	Marilu Achille, Bianca Adefarakan, Liz Aggiss, Liesje Cole, Tig Evans, Hazel Finnis, Leonora Green, Lisa Haight, Siou Hannam, Doris Harman, China King, Mim King, Soile Lahdenpera, Nusera Mai-Ngarm, Pauline Rennison, Enily Shaw, Lois Underwood; Live music from Juliet Russell (lead singer) and Marjorie Ashenden, Anna Copley, Lucy East, Gret Hopkings, Emma Stevens (cellists)
1994	Beethoven in Love	Film, directed by Bob Bentley	Liz Aggiss, Tommy Bayley; Choir: Jeddi Bassan, Sharon Curtis, Lisa Haight, Chris Hallam, Ralf Higgins, Andrew Kay, Mim King, Sai Roberts, Maggy Burrows, Mark Harrison; Musicians: Elizabeth Woollet (soprano), Juliet Russell (mezzo), Thomas Kampe (tenor) Ian Needle (bass) Billy Cowie (piano)
1994	Absurditties	Stage show	Liz Aggiss
1995	Hi Jinx	Performance lecture with films	Liz Aggiss, Aikiko Kajahara, Lea Anderson
	The Fetching Bride	Stage show	Liz Aggiss, Chloe Wright, Colette Sadler; Live music from Billy Cowie (piano), Anne Stephenson (violin), Sian Bell (cello), Amanda Morrison (soprano)
	Bird in a Ribcage	Stage show	Becky Brown, Lucy Dunden, Wei-Ying Hsu, Akiko Kajahara, Kathinka Luhr, Rachel Read, Colette Sadler
1997	Divagate	Stage show with films	Liz Aggiss, Richard Knight, Sebastian Gonzalez, Melanie Marshall
1999	The 38 Steps	Stage show by InToto Dance Company	Eve Caille, Young Soon Cho, Vahine Ehrensperger, Claudia Evans, Karen Foley, Alicia Herrera Simon, Allison Higgins, Melissa Hunter, Anette Iverson, Margun Kilde, Renate Kohoutek, Kaori Murukami, Marissa Nielson-Pincus, Emma Ribbing, Dawn Ritchie, Janine Skidmore, Annabel Smart, Khadifa Wong
2000	The Surgeon's Waltz	Stage show by High Spin (Carousel's dance company)	Sunah Al-Husainy, Ingrid Ashberry, Julia Burcham, Andrew Franks, Irene Mensah, David Mileman, Maria Pengelly, Ben Pierre, Andy Saunders
2001	Rice Rain	Stage show by High Spin (Carousel's dance company)	Julia Burcham, Rainna Crudge, Andrew Franks, Becki Hodgson, Irene Mensah, David Mileman, Maria Pengelly, Ben Pierre, Mark Richardson, Andy Saunders
2002	Motion Control	Film, directed by David Anderson	Liz Aggiss
	Anarchic Variations	Film	Liz Aggiss
	Scripted to Within an Inch of Her Life	Installation performance with film	Liz Aggiss
2003	Men in the Wall	3d screen installation (final collaboration with Billy Cowie)	Jeddi Bassan, Sebastian Gonzalez, Thomas Kampe, Scott Smith
2008	Guerilla Dances	Live pop-up dance 'reconstructions'	Liz Aggiss
	Don't Put Your Daughter on the Stage	Stage show created for MapDance Chichester	
2009	Diva	Film made with Joe Murray	Liz Aggiss, Matthew Andrews, Jedi Bassan, Vicki Bloor, Judy Bow, Vita Dudley Bow, Pete Nicholas
	Double Vision	Stage collaboration with Charlotte Vincent	Liz Aggiss, Charlotte Vincent
2010	Survival Tactics	Performance lecture	Liz Aggiss
2011	Beach Party Animal	Film made with Joe Murray	Jo Andrews, Avis Cockbill, Tim Crouch, Janine Fletcher, Antonia Gove, Thomas Kampe
2012	Blurred Vision	Stage collaboration with Charlotte Vincent	Liz Aggiss, Charlotte Vincent
2014	Bloody Nora	Stage show created for Nora Invites	Eleanor Sikorski, Flora Wellesley Wesley
	Cut with the Kitchen Knife	Stage show created for MapDance Chichester	
2015	The English Channel	Solo stage show with films	Liz Aggiss, Antonia Gove, Emma Kilbey, Lisa Wolfe, Richard Hawley(film narrator)
	History Repeating...	Stage show created for MapDance Chichester	
2017	Slap and Tickle	Solo stage show	Liz Aggiss
2019	Head in My Bag	Stage show created for Dance Six-0	
2025	Crone Alone	Solo stage show	
2019/2023	Made to Last	Stage show created for MADE, Hobart, Tasmania	Christine Bell, Penny Carey-Wells, Mary Eckhardt, Shirley Gibson,, Annie Greenhill, Lucinda Sharp
