= The Zap =

Nightclub and performance arts venue in England

The Zap was a beach-front nightclub and performance arts venue, in Brighton, England that became known in the late 1980s and early 1990s particularly for its acid house nights. It has been described as an "influential ... club which pulled together many of the underground strands of visual art, fashion, music, design, comedy, cabaret and theatre which were circling at the time".

== Arts venue ==
In the 1980s the Zap was a performance arts venue. It first opened at the New Oriental Hotel, Brighton in April 1982. Founded by Neil Butler, Patricia Butler and Amanda Scott, it was an experiment to mix radical art with cutting edge entertainment. The first shows were presented in a cabaret format mixing performance art, poetry, comedy, dance and theatre with the opening night featuring Ian Smith, Roger Ely and the band Resident Zero. Smith hosted Performance Platform on Tuesdays and later the Silver Tongue Club on Sundays. These played host to numerous stand-up comedians, artists, dancers and theatre groups. Tony Lidington of the Pierrotters recalled,

"Alongside such acts as the Pookies, Theatre of the Bleeding Obelisk, Bright Red, The Pierotters, The Wild Wigglers, the nascent alternative cabaret and street scene had support and a home on the south coast...These seminal groups have had a profound impact on the contemporary performance scene in Britain today."

It soon moved to the Royal Escape and then to the Northern before finally settling at its own venue in the King's Road Arches in October 1984. In 1985 it issued an LP record called Live at the Zap Club, including tracks by Pete McCarthy and John Dowie.

The Club was organised by four directors: Neil and Pat Butler, Dave Reeves and Angie Goodchild / Angie Livingston. Ian Smith was the resident MC and in the new venue the Club hosted both live music and house music. Meanwhile, The Zap continued to promote and commission radical art and entertainment through its regular performance programmes, commissions and festivals.

=== Arts programming ===
From 1985, the Zap staged an annual alternative pantomime, performed by Zap staff and other performers, including John Dowie, James Poulter, Robin Driscoll, Tony Haase, Becky Stevens, Pete McCarthy, Andy Cunningham, Louise Rennison, Liz Aggiss, Steve North, John Cunningham, Roy Smiles, Jonathan Lemon and Jane Bassett.

The Brighton based Yes/No People staged the preview of their show Stomp at the Zap in May 1990, ahead of the show's official premiere in Edinburgh the following year.

In 1986, the Zap commissioned Liz Aggiss and Billy Cowie of the Wild Wigglers to make a stage show in one of the Zap's arches. The show, a solo performance by Aggiss, was Grotesque Dancer, which premiered at the Zap in December 1986. This was the beginning of Divas Dance Theatre, which went on to premiere five more stage shows at the Zap: Dorothy and Klaus (1989) Die Orchidee im Plastik Karton (1989), Drool and Drivel They Care (1990) Cafeteria for a Sit-Down Meal (1992) and Absurditties(1994)

A later performance night was "Andy Walkers Frame Fame" on early Friday evenings, which showcased new performers and acts on the stage, introduced by Andy Walker and Adrian Bunting.

=== Zap Productions projects elsewhere ===
The Club's commitment to "New Art for New Audiences" led to a range of projects across the UK, including curating seasons of performance at the Institute of Contemporary Arts and London's South Bank and developing the Streetbiz Street Arts Festival as part of Glasgow's 1990 European Capital of Culture. These external projects were managed by Zap Productions where The Zap directors were joined by Robin Morley. In 1994 Zap Productions joined with Edinburgh's Unique Events to create Glasgow based UZ Events. UZ went on to create a range of festivals and events including the Shine on Festival, Glasgow's Hogmanay and Millennium celebrations, Big in Falkirk, Glasgow Art Fair and Glasgow's Merchant City Festival. Internationally UZ created programmes for the Scottish Government (Executive) in New York, Canada, and Sweden and a range of projects in many countries.

== Clubbing ==
Key club nights that became associated with The Zap were "Tonka" with DJs DJ Harvey, Choci and Rev (Mondays), "Club Shame" (Wednesdays), "Protechtion" with DJ Eric Powell (Fridays), and "Coco Club" with DJ Chris Coco (Saturdays).

Tuesday evenings at The Zap were staged by Josh Dean and Martin Southern, two promoters booking a broad variety of bands such as The Lemonheads, Rollins Band, Teenage Fanclub and Hole.

Located in 5 arches on the King's Road (seafront) in Brighton, audiences would party until 5 am, with many continuing the motion (or more often sleeping) on the beach opposite until sunrise, depending on the time of year. The Zap is mentioned in the book The Black Album by Hanif Kureishi.

A large part of The Zap's appeal was its location. It was for many years the only nightclub on the lower seafront. It was popular with a broad mix of people and helped define clubbing regardless of sexual orientation. 'Club Shame' on Wednesdays was regarded as "the blueprint of gay clubbing in the nineties" and was involved in bringing gay clubbing into the mainstream, thanks to the efforts of promoter Paul Kemp.

=== Acid house, rave, house and the early dance music era ===
"Tonka" nights continued for five years, ending in summer 1993, and "Protechtion" evolved into a new promotion later the same year. The following year, Chris Coco brought his Saturday nights to an end. From the late 1980s to the early 1990s, these three nights had continually played underground dance. While "Tonka" straddled the acid house and early trance eras, "Protechtion" was more British style of techno, played by Eric Powell which was later further developed by DJs such as Dave Clarke, and Powell's Bush Records label; a happier, British house sound, played by London DJ Paul Newman (better known as "Tall Paul") Smokin Jo, John "double O" Fleming and DJ Paulette. Additionally, Chris Coco's Saturday night played a more American style of dance music, predominantly Chicago house and then US garage. Coco Club's Chris Coco and his wife Helene would talk to and welcome clubbers to the venue.

=== The 1990s ===
The Zap continued to host emerging DJs and newer styles of electronic dance music during the 1990s.

While the club continued the previous policies of tech-house, and Techno (Red) on Fridays, and House music and garage (Pussycat Club) on Saturdays with Residents Nippa and Neil Rhoden, Monday nights had a range of nights, with everything from trip hop to trance music. The Zap brought trance, then emerging from the Frankfurt underground, to the UK, with regular Monday night sets from Sven Vath and DJ Dag (of Dance 2 Trance). Other European DJs such as Laurent Garnier and CJ Bolland also performed at The Zap around this time.

The Zap's Monday nights during the mid 1990s also provided opportunity for American and British DJs. David Morales and Frankie Knuckles both played US house at The Zap on a Monday night, while DJs Sasha and John Digweed, launched their 'Northern Exposure' night in autumn 1993. Sasha & John Digweed brought progressive dance music to the club. Despite The Zap's sound system often being criticised, Sasha was quoted in a dance music magazine as saying his two favourite clubs were The Haçienda and The Zap.

In the mid 1990s, Danny Rampling was invited by promoters Wayne Seven-Kurz and Sdaegh Al Hilaly to hold a monthly residence at a new promotion called "South" which showcased his new, trancey, Euro style. Saturday nights also adapted, bringing a more "pumped up", Superclub style of House Music to the Club. Thus Paul Oakenfold and Jeremy Healy both played in the club during these years.

== Kings Road Arches ==
The arches were originally used by the fishermen for storing equipment. These were long and narrow with curved ceilings. Originally, The Zap consisted of two of these arches (entrance and performance area) before another one was added for a bar. In 1989 it underwent a massive overhaul which saw the opening of two more of the adjoining arches. This gave it a proper stage with a balcony and bar overlooking it. It was further enlarged in 1996 to include another arch.

A balcony was added in the early 1990s giving direct views of the beach. The Zap was also one of only two nightclubs in the town to be given an extended licence in the early 1990s, allowing it to remain open after 2 am (the other venue was the Royal Escape). These two clubs competed for Brighton's late night club goers despite the licence restricting entry after 1 am.

== Move to new ownership ==
The original Zap directors sold the club in 1997 to a larger company. The club closed for a week and re-opened under new ownership and management in December 1997 following the sale; the owners, management and promoters all changing. Only the Friday Promotion was kept on with the help of DJ Eric Powell until 1999.

Zap Productions continued for some years before handing over all projects to the charity Zap Art which continued to create programmes and commission artists and companies in the field of street arts. Zap Art was removed from the charity register in December 2019 due to ceasing operations.

== Closure and subsequent use as The Union, Digital and The Arch ==
The Zap closed in early 2005, reopening as The Union, and three months later was renamed The Zap. It was closed and refurbished yet again and re-branded as Digital in 2008, reselling again in 2014 and being re-branded as The Arch.

== Publications ==
- ZAP: Twenty-five Years of Innovation. Zap Art/QueensPark, 2007. Edited by Max Crisfield. ISBN 978-0-904733-33-4.

== General references ==
- 25 years of cultural innovation. mybrightonandhove.org.uk
