= Bill Thomas (actor) =

English actor (born 1952)

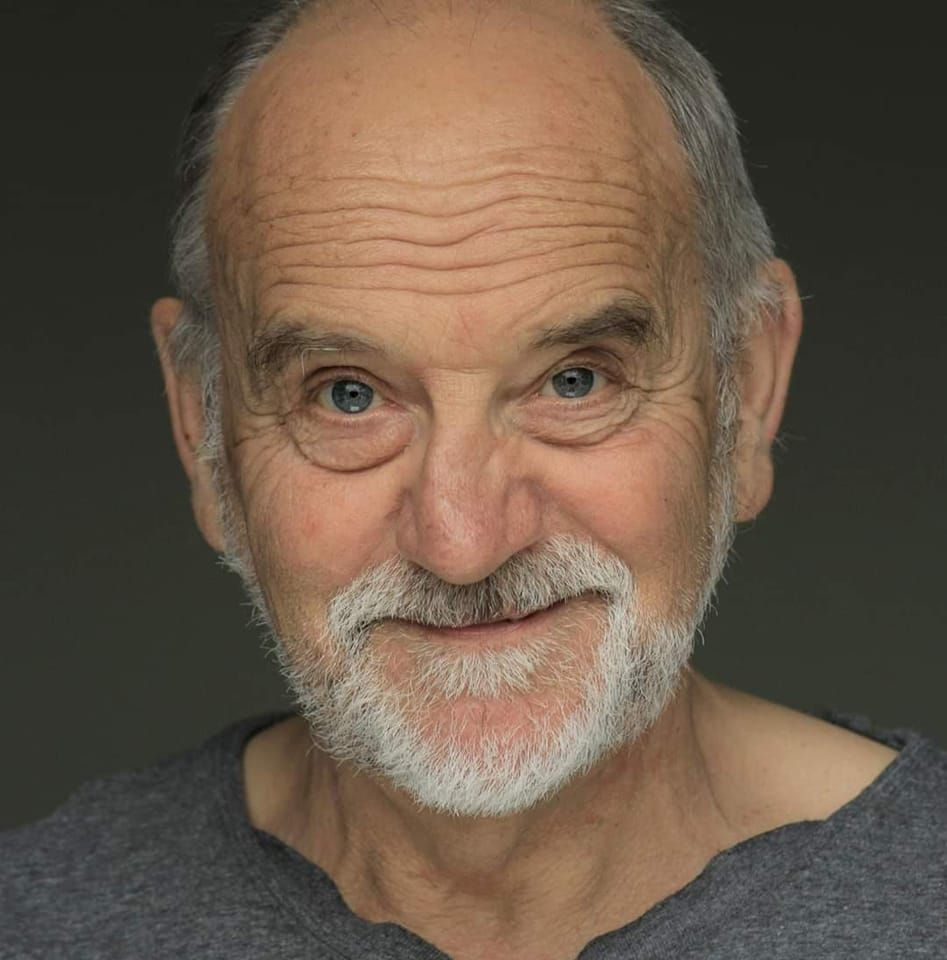
- Thomas in 2016
- Born: London, England, UK
- Occupation: Actor

Bill Thomas (born 1952) is an English stage and screen actor, one of the most prolific actors of his generation. In forty six years as a professional actor Bill played four hundred and sixty three characters but never a doctor, policeman or soldier, until his last film Loving Vincent in which he was Dr Mazery. The film was nominated for an Oscar.

His body of work encompassed 18 feature films, 31 short films, 130 Television productions, 74 theatre productions, 166 adverts.

From 2010 he struggled to remember lines and gave up acting in 2016 to become the doorman at Selfridges, the famous department store in London's Oxford Street, effectively his West End debut, and the most glamorous job he ever had.

He has written a novel called "Ordinary - the novel that Tommy Warren wrote" about a very elderly doorman who is persuaded by a colleague to write a novel about his experiences during WWII. Finding himself short of material he starts to make things up (or does he?).

== Career ==
He was Tom Henshall, long suffering father of the hairdressing sisters in four seasons of the BBC series Cutting It and Charles Quance, the tailor who has a bumpy romance with one of the seamstresses in three seasons of the classic BBC serial The House of Eliott.

He took the lead role of Colin in the feature film Weak at Denise, about a woman who is coaxed to seduce him by her immoral boyfriend to get his money but falls in love (a happy ending) and The Sky in Bloom in which he was Branick Hammond, who is dying from cancer (but that's the least of his problems) and Syrup (which was nominated for an Academy Award for best short life action feature in 1994). A bald man gets a wig and it changes his life.

He was featured artist in 166 TV commercials all over the world.

A return to the stage saw him playing Ironside, in An English Tragedy, a new play by Oscar-winning playwright Ronald Harwood. A generation of young adults know him as Mr Tucknott the pompous and terrifying bank manager in the classic Bodger and Badger series on BBCTV.

His previous stage work includes the lead role in Dragon in the Olivier Theatre as a member of the Royal National Theatre, a remarkable and innovative production by the accomplished director Ulz, after working together at Nottingham Playhouse. He was Arturo UI in The Resistible Rise of Arturo Ui, directed by David Gilmore at the Nuffield Theatre, Southampton and went on to lead roles in repertory for much his early career (including six plays by Shakespeare).

He has a long connection with the Theatre Royal, Stratford, E15, where with Jeff Teare and Patrick Prior he pioneered a series of political dramas, developing and performing leading roles in satirical attacks on Margaret Thatchers government. The same team produced pantomimes for many years during the 1980s and 90's which set a standard in British Theatre for integrity and quality.

TV work has included spells in Emmerdale and six episodes of Doctors, all different people, three different people inHeartbeat, five different people in The Bill, four different people in Midsomer Murders.

He has also makes pictures and has exhibited at the Whitechapel Gallery in East London, where he has lived for most of his life.

== Selected film and television work ==
(click title to watch clip)

Year	Production	Type	Part	clip
2016	Loving Vincent	Animated feature film	Dr Mazery (who claimed van Gogh was murdered). Oscar nominated as best animated feature.	
2011	Outnumbered	BBCTV series	Mr Blain, Ben's teacher at parent's evening	
2011	Pusher	Feature Film	Jack (who owes money to some bad, bad people. Ends up dead)	
2010	The Sky in Bloom	Feature film	Branick Hammond – traffics women and runs brothels. Ends up dead.	
2010	Merlin	BBCTV series	Cylferth – sword maker and magician. Ends up dead.	
2010	Doctors	BBCTV series	Hairy Potter (wigmaker won't take his medicine)	
2010	Prices to Pay	Short film	The Norfolk Farmer who shot a burglar	
2009	The Canoe Man	TV drama	Sampson – surely campsite manager	
2009	The Bill	BBC TV series	Charles Greene (nice neighbour helps victim)	
2009	Heartbeat	BBCTV series	Station Master attacked by dog, pigeons and a fire extinguisher	
2009	Emmerdale	ITV series	Ernest Amplethorpe – impassioned lover thumps the Bishop	
2008	Wire in the Blood	ITV series	John Rowland – paranoiac neighbour of main man	
2008	The Antiques Rogueshow	TV drama	Fitch – the neighbour who blabs to the tabloids	
2008	Trial and Retribution	ITV series	Norman Gladstone, custodian of criminal evidence warehouse	
2007	Messiah	BBCTV series	Harry Fullerton – flower seller, bereaved husband and father	
2007	Midsomer Murders	ITV series	Derek Wildacre – newly widowed and grieving	
2006	New Tricks	BBCTV series	Evans – imprisoned for 20 years for a crime he did not commit, released after a retired policeman takes up his case.	
2006	Dalziel and Pascoe	TV Series	Phil Cooper a man with a water diviner	
2006	City Lights	BBCTV series	Mr Youd – employs his daughters boyfriend and pal to dig a pond, lives to regret it.	
2003-6	Cutting It	BBCTV series	Tom Henshall – 20+ episodes as dad to three girls who set up a hairdressers. Has affair with pornstar etc. Gross wife.	
2006	Foyles War	BBCTV series	Willis the Air raid warden – finds a body with a knife in it in debris of bombed house	
1998	Bodger and Badger	BBCTV series	Mr Woberts the watcatcher	
1993	Syrup	Short film	George (lead) bald man gets a wig. Nominated for an Oscar.	

== Appearances in theatre include ==
- Ironside, the prison warder in a new play by Oscar-winning writer Ronald Harwood, An English Tragedy – Watford Palace Theatre.
- Burgomeister (lead), in Dragon at the Olivier – Royal National Theatre
- Arturo Ui in The Resistible Rise of Arturo Ui – Nuffield Theatre, Southampton
