= Nicola Hall =

English classical guitarist

Nicola Hall (born 3 March 1969), is an English classical guitarist.

She was born in Ipswich and studied at Chetham's School of Music, later at the Royal Northern College of Music and also with John Williams. She won first prizes in several competitions (1986 Poland, 2nd prize in 1987 Toronto). She was the first guitarist to receive the Royal Overseas League's gold medal in 1989. Her 1991 debut disc Virtuoso Guitar Transcriptions was highly praised for both technical brilliance and artistic expression.

Nicola Hall's recordings present her own transcriptions of works originally composed for other instruments.

== Recordings ==
- Virtuoso Guitar Transcriptions (Decca, 1991). Includes: 1. Sergei Rachmaninov: Prelude in G minor, op. 23 no. 5; 2. Isaac Albéniz: Granada; 3. Pablo Sarasate: Zapateado op. 23 no. 2; 4. Niccolò Paganini: Caprice op. 1 no. 24; 5. Maria Theresia von Paradis: Sicilienne; 6. Johann Sebastian Bach: Partita in D minor BWV 1004.
- Paganini/Sarasate/Castelnuovo-Tedesco (Decca, 1994), with London Mozart Players/Andrew Litton. Includes: 1. Niccolò Paganini: Concerto No. 2 in B minor op. 7; 2. Pablo Sarasate: Zigeunerweisen op. 20; 3. Mario Castelnuovo-Tedesco: Concerto No. 1 in D major for guitar and orchestra.
- The Art of the Guitar (Decca, 1994). Includes: 1. William Walton: Five Bagatelles; 2. Johann Sebastian Bach: Sonata No. 2 in A minor BWV 1003; 3. Federico Moreno Torroba: Sonatina; 4. Joaquín Rodrigo: Invocación y danza; 5. Johann Kaspar Mertz: Fantasie hongroise op. 65 no. 1.
- Canciónes para Guitarra (Divas Records, 1999). Contains: Billy Cowie: Canciónes para Guitarra, Books 1–3.
