= Pogo (dance) =

Dance

The pogo is a dance in which the dancers jump up and down, while either remaining on the spot or moving around; the dance takes its name from its resemblance to the use of a pogo stick, especially in a common version of the dance, where one keeps one's torso stiff, one's arms rigid, and one's legs close together. Pogo dancing is most associated with punk rock, and is a precursor to moshing.

== Style ==
The basic steps allow for a variety of interpretations, some of which might appear quite violent. Pogo dancers have their choice of:

- Keeping their torsos rigid or thrashing them about;
- Holding their arms stiffly at their sides or flailing them;
- Keeping their legs together or kicking about; or
- Jumping straight up and down, jumping in any direction, or spinning in the air.

== History ==
In The Filth and the Fury, Sex Pistols bassist Sid Vicious claimed that he invented the pogo sometime around 1976 at punk shows in the early days of London's punk scene. Vicious supposedly invented the dance as a way of mocking people who came to see Sex Pistols' performances, but who were not part of the punk movement. Whether Vicious actually invented the dance or not, the pogo quickly became closely associated with punk rock. Shane MacGowan, himself an early follower of the punk scene, also attributes pogo dancing to Vicious, claiming that a leather poncho he wore to gigs prevented him from any form of dancing other than jumping up and down. In her autobiography, Clothes, Clothes, Clothes. Music, Music, Music. Boys, Boys, Boys., Viv Albertine of The Slits claims that the Pogo was inspired by the way Sid jumped up and down while playing saxophone.

== See also ==
- The Safety Dance
- J. H. Stead
