= Bodger & Badger =

- Created by: Andy Cunningham
- Starring: Andy Cunningham
- Country of origin: United Kingdom
- Original language: English
- No. of series: 9
- No. of episodes: 124

Production
- Production locations: Studio portions: BBC Television Centre (all series, mostly studio TC7), Location portions: Chessington World of Adventures (series 4), Hanwell, Acton and Ealing (series 5-7), Brighton and Hove (series 8 & 9).
- Running time: 15 minutes

Original release
- Network: BBC One
- Release: 13 September 1989 – 29 March 1999

Bodger & Badger is a BBC children's comedy programme written by Andy Cunningham, first broadcast in 1989. It starred Cunningham as handyman Simon Bodger and his talking badger companion. The programme originated from some appearances the duo first made together in 1988 as part of the Saturday morning BBC One children's programme On the Waterfront.

== Plot ==
The programme followed the exploits of Simon Bodger and his puppet companion, Badger, a badly behaved but friendly and cheerful badger with a proclivity for mashed potato and huge mess. The first four series focused on Bodger's jobs as a handyman and his attempts to hide Badger from his superiors. Series 1 was set at Troff's Nosherama, a café where Bodger worked as a cook. Series 2 and 3 were set at Letsby Avenue Junior School. Series 4 was set at Chessington World of Adventures, a real theme park in Surrey.

From series 5, the character Mousey was introduced, a puppet mouse with a fondness for cheese. The show was now set at Bodger's rented home and later his B&B hotel. Series 5-7 rarely mentioned Bodger's employment, suggesting he was now unemployed. The later series still focused on Bodger's attempts to hide Badger from figures of authority, his landlady from Series 6-7 and the tourist information officer in series 9. These later episodes increased the slapstick humour with prominent comic sound effects and incidental music.

According to Andy Cunningham, the programme ended when the Head of BBC Children's Programmes, Christopher Pilkington (who had initially commissioned the show in 1989) left his post. Cunningham did not mind, as he said he was struggling for inspiration for things to do with mashed potato towards the end of the show's run.

== Theme song ==
The programme's theme song is sung by children. The music was composed by Peter Gosling and the lyrics written by Andy Cunningham. Various edits of the song were used over the years, with the full version used on the end credits of some episodes from 1989 to 1991.

== Characters and cast ==
=== Main characters ===
- Simon Bodger (Andy Cunningham) - Simon Bodger is a handyman who has had various jobs throughout the series. He is of a nervous disposition, which causes him to be clumsy. Badger's antics repeatedly cost Bodger his job. He has worked as a cook, a school caretaker, a zookeeper, and the temporary owner of a Bed and Breakfast. In the fifth, sixth and seventh series he was seemingly unemployed and renting a flat, occasionally working as a casual handyman to his landlady, Mrs Dribelle. Badger is his pet and best friend, although all the trouble that Bodger ends up in is usually down to Badger. Regular gags usually involve Badger covering Bodger in mashed potato or some other messy substance.
- Badger (voiced by Andy Cunningham, operated by Andy Cunningham + others) - An anthropomorphic badger who talks with a South London accent. He wears a red beret and red and white patterned neckerchief. Badger is obsessed with mashed potato, which he likes to play with as well as eat. As Simon tries to keep Badger's existence a secret, Simon often gets the blame for Badger's mishaps. Nevertheless, Badger is still a very good friend to Simon and tries to help him out in every way he can, although Badger usually misunderstands a situation or can take things literally.
- Mousey (voiced and operated by Jane Bassett) - Mousey is an anthropomorphic talking mouse who lives under the floorboards of the flat that Bodger rents from Series 5–7. She and Badger are great friends, both constantly getting up to mischief. Mousey's presence is only known by Badger and later also by China. When Bodger and Badger move to Puddleford to run their hotel in Series 8, Mousey moves with them and takes up residence in the airing cupboard rather than under the floorboards.

=== Series 1 ===
- Mr Hector Troff (Roger Walker) - The arrogant and tight-fisted owner of the restaurant in Series 1. He has no knowledge of Badger's presence (although he keeps glimpsing him but putting it down to his over-active imagination) until the final episode of the series. His character is based on that of Arkwright from Open All Hours - there are several similarities between the two characters, mainly a desire to improve their respective businesses while wanting to spend as little money as possible in doing so.
- Mavis (Joanne Campbell) - An out-of-work singer who worked as a waitress at the restaurant with Bodger and was friendly with both Bodger and Badger. She returned, having made her fame and fortune in the singing profession, for one episode during Series 2 when she visited Bodger and Badger at Letsby Avenue Junior School.

=== Series 2 and 3 ===
- Mrs Daphne Trout (Lila Kaye) - The cruel and overweight Headmistress of Letsby Avenue Junior School. She was referred to as 'Fish-face' by Badger and the school children. She enjoyed insulting Bodger and Miss Moon, being nasty to the children and going down the cake shop.
- Miss Geraldine Moon (Selina Cadell) - The warm-hearted but dim-witted Deputy Head of Letsby Avenue Junior School throughout Series 2 and 3. She repeatedly sees Badger, but always passes it off as overwork or some other stress-related mental health issue.
- Mr Valentino (Rudolph Walker) - Chairman of the School Board of Governors of Letsby Avenue Junior School, who appeared in two episodes in Series 3. He sends Mrs Trout away to retrain as a teacher after he realises she is an incompetent Headmistress.
- Mrs Prunella Bogart (Richenda Carey) - Mrs. Trout's sister, a nasty-tempered Headmistress. Like Mrs Trout, she is lazy and prefers to delegate as much of her work as possible to Miss Moon.
- Eamon Trout (Philip Herbert) - Mrs Trout's spoiled son, and therefore Mrs Bogart's nephew. He wanted Mrs Bogart to fire Bodger so he could be the school handyman, but he was quickly scared away by Badger and the children.

=== Series 4 ===
- Mr Lionel Beasley (Jon Glover) - Bodger's superior at Chessington World of Adventures in Series 4. He tries to imply he is an educated professional, and excellent at his job. He knows of Badger's presence at the park and is constantly trying to catch him, although he does not know he is Bodger's pet. He is nicknamed 'Measly Beasley' because of his unfriendly, strict and pompous attitude.
- Holly (Sophie Worters) - A friendly girl who spends a lot of time at Chessington in Series 4. She is good friends with both Bodger and Badger and dislikes Mr Beasley just as much as they do.

=== Series 5, 6 and 7 ===
- "Boss" & Courtney (Penelope Nice and Ashley Artus) - Two villainous thieves who attempt to burgle Bodger's flat in Series 5. Posing as two council officers upgrading home security, they try to steal a valuable Ancient Egyptian statue which belongs to Bodger's aunt. They fail, thanks to Badger who tricks the dim-witted Courtney into believing that it is a cursed statue that throws 'Ancient Egyptian mashed potato' if tampered with.
- Mrs Cecilia Dribelle (Carol MacReady) - Bodger's landlady in Series 6 and 7. She has a distinct dislike for animals (apart from cats) and forbids her tenants from keeping pets, resulting in Bodger having to constantly hide Badger whenever she visits. She dislikes Bodger intensely and tries everything she can think of to evict him. She is nicknamed 'Mrs Dribble' and 'Dribbly Bibbly' by Badger. In her early episodes she is made aware of Badger's presence by her sidekick, Elton, but never actually sees him. She later employs Bodger as her handyman in Series 7.
- Elton (Joe Cushley) - Mrs Dribelle's dim-witted sidekick. He is a hardman who always wears a woolly hat with badges and a denim jacket. He knows that Bodger has a badger in the flat after Badger hits him on the head with a frying pan. He is incredibly stupid and is always trying to prove to Mrs Dribelle that there is a badger in the flat by all means possible, but he never succeeds. Elton did not feature after Series 6.
- Alec Smart (Ricky Diamond) - The sly and untrustworthy tenant who moves into the flat above Bodger's in Series 7. He was always thinking up schemes to make money, often tricking Mrs Dribelle and Bodger in the process. He sucks up to Mrs Dribelle while secretly trying to scam her. He is eventually evicted. When Bodger and Badger move to Puddleford at the beginning of Series 8 to run a hotel, they are horrified to discover that Mr Smart is their next door neighbour once again.
- Vicky (Sally Ann Marsh) - Mrs Dribelle's niece. She was supposed to have been an accountant, but Vicky had dreams of being part of a band. She moves into the upstairs flat after Alec Smart is thrown out. She is supposed to work for her auntie, but she is always secretly auditioning for jobs as a drummer. She hides her drum kit in the bath when Mrs Dribelle visits as she disapproves of it. Vicky and Badger got on very well as they both love mashed potato. She ended up going on tour with a travelling band as a drummer. Vicky only appeared in Series 7.

=== Series 8 and 9 ===
- Millie (Jane Bassett) - A milkwoman in Puddleford who is a friend of Bodger and Badger in Series 8 and 9. She helps out Bodger and Badger on numerous occasions, mainly allowing use of her milk float to carry customers around, such as picking Mr Wilson up from the station. She shares their dislike of Mr Smart and Mrs Melly. She owns a dog named China, who is friends with Badger.
- China - A dog originally owned by the Hutchins family in Series 8 but later belongs to Millie in Series 9. He worked with Badger and Mousey to cause chaos with mashed potato around Puddleford. He likes annoying Mrs Melly by barking loudly outside her office.
- Miss Prunella Peake (Valerie Minifie) - One of Bodger's first hotel guests in Series 8. She was bad-tempered and miserable and was rather rude and quite threatening to Bodger.
- Mr Tucknott (Bill Thomas) - A bank manager who stayed in Bodger's hotel in Series 8. He is quite cheerful but appears to be long-suffering and quite nervous about his job, and becomes particularly worried when trying to write a speech in the episode 'Mashy Record Breakers'.
- Mrs Bobbins (Jo Warne) - Stayed in Bodger's hotel in Series 8 at the same time as Mr Tucknott. She is very bubbly and appears to like Bodger, but is not aware of Badger's presence, even in the episode 'Big Bear' when Badger poses as a large teddy bear which she bought for her granddaughter and she tries to wrap him up in wrapping paper.
- Mrs Sharona Melly (Carole Boyd) - The bossy Tourist Information officer from Series 9. She is highly suspicious of Bodger and believes that he is hiding something in his hotel, although she never actually finds out about Badger. She dislikes people having fun on the beach outside her office and will do anything to prevent it. She has a lot of trouble with China the dog, who is always hanging around her office. She often looks for quick ways to make money.
- Mr Malcolm Wilson (Matthew Woolcott) - A trainee bank manager who stayed in Bodger's hotel in Series 9. He is a bit of a cry-baby, who gets upset over the slightest things.
- Mr Bill Gripper (Roger Liddle) - Another hotel guest from two episodes in Series 9. A school P.E. teacher who had a crush on Mrs Melly and challenged Mr Wilson to a running race along the sea front, which he lost (thanks to Badger).

== Crew ==
- Andy Cunningham - Creator / Writer of most of the episodes (series 1-9).
- Wayne Jackman - Writer (series 6-7)
- Jane Bassett - Other Writer of most of the episodes (series 7-9).
- Pierre Hollins - Writer (series 7)
- Claire Winyard - Director (series 2)
- Judy Whitfield - Executive Producer, Producer (series 1)
- Greg Childs - Producer (series 2)
- Christine Hewitt - Producer (series 5–8)
- Sue Morgan - Producer (series 9)
- Oscar Shaw - mash chef (series 1-3)

== Popularity ==
A performance at a 'Mashed Potato Night', 2006.

In 2000 and 2001, all episodes of Bodger and Badger were repeated on archive children's programming strand CBBC on the BBC Choice digital TV channel. Additionally, they were broadcast on CBeebies in 2002 but then disappeared from schedules until 2005 when the CBBC channel began a repeat of series 6–9. Since 2008 it has not been shown at all, although recorded episodes have surfaced on the internet and exist on YouTube.

Bodger and Badger has enjoyed something of a cult status, particularly among teenagers and young adults who grew up with the programme. It has also found popularity amongst students, tuning into daytime repeats. As such, it has led to a popular tour of UK universities; 'Mashed Potato Theme Nights' were held at various universities, including Hull, Aston, Warwick, Bath, Buckinghamshire New and Aberystwyth. A DVD, 'Bodger and Badger: Live', was released on 6 November 2006.

Bodger and Badger have also since appeared in other venues, most notably in the kids' field at Glastonbury Festival, where a routine aimed primarily at children is also cleverly seeded with knowing in-jokes about the festival and the people attending it.

In 2007, two adverts were filmed for instant mashed potato brand Smash, the first in a planned series of adverts for a new marketing campaign featuring the two characters and playing on Badger's love of mashed potato. However, whilst the first two adverts were completed and shown at trade fairs, as well as some industry literature featuring the characters released, the ad campaign was ultimately dropped and never aired, due to the BBC still owning the rights to the Bodger and Badger name and concept, which would conflict with the BBC's obligation to not use any of its programmes or stars to promote commercial properties.

== Series and episodes ==
=== Series One (1989) ===
Series 1 featured Bodger and Badger working in Troff's Nosherama, a run-down café with pretensions to being a restaurant. It was not known during production whether another series was to be commissioned, hence the last episode of this series is titled "The Final Episode".

The closing titles of this series at first featured specially-shot clips of the cast (in character) then a specially-shot clip of Badger over the technical crew credits. This changed gradually through the series, slowly incorporating repeated clips of cast members (in character) from earlier in the episode, although these were occasionally interspersed with the specially-shot clips, with the latter gradually being phased out. The specially-shot clip of Badger over the technical crew credits remained, however.

The series was broadcast weekly on Wednesdays from 13 September 1989 at 4:05 pm.

No. overall	No. in series	Title	Original release date
1	1	"Bodger is Chef"	13 September 1989
Simon Bodger must win a cookery contest to get the Chef's job at Troff's Nosherama.
2	2	"The Badgers Are Coming"	20 September 1989
Badger ends up inside a cake.
3	3	"The Health Inspector"	27 September 1989
The Health Inspector pays a visit to Troff's Nosherama where she thinks she's seeing badgers.
4	4	"Portrait of Hector"	4 October 1989
Mr Troff wants his portrait on the poster and decides the Nosherama needs a new Welcome sign. Mr Troff thinks Mavis is the artist, but in fact it is Badger.
5	5	"Auntie Warnty"	11 October 1989
Mr Troff’s Australian aunt comes to visit the Nosherama.
6	6	"Adrian Loud Warbler"	18 October 1989
Adrian Loud Warbler invites Mavis to lunch to discuss a singing job. Unfortunately he takes her to the Nosherama!
7	7	"The Robot"	25 October 1989
Bodger is in danger of being replaced as chef at the Nosherama when a salesman shows Mr Troff a new 'Shove-a-Chef' called Automania. It comes to Mr Troff's Nosherama.
8	8	"The Final Episode"	1 November 1989
Bodger and Badger are left in charge of the Nosherama, but things do not quite go according to plan with a wedding cake for the wedding party of two mountaineers. Fortunately, Mavis and Badger have an idea when Bodger accidentally crushes the cake...

=== Series Two (1991) ===
Series 2 and 3 featured Bodger and Badger working at Letsby Avenue junior school. Simon worked as the caretaker.

The series was broadcast weekly on Wednesdays from 9 January 1991 at 3:50 pm.

No. overall	No. in series	Title	Original release date
9	1	"Letsby Avenue"	9 January 1991
Bodger applies for the handyman's job at Letsby Avenue Junior School, but will he get it?
10	2	"Abracabadger"	16 January 1991
Will magic be enough when Miss Moon sees Badger? Class Four come to the rescue.
11	3	"The Bare Mayor"	23 January 1991
Mrs Trout announces that the mayor is coming to visit the school, but Badger gets the wrong end of the stick.
12	4	"The Skeleton"	30 January 1991
Mrs Trout purchases a skeleton for the school, but at the expense of any school trips.
13	5	"Mr Woberts The Watcatcher"	6 February 1991
Mrs Trout thinks the school has rats, so she calls in a ratcatcher.
14	6	"The Hairy Fairy"	13 February 1991
Mrs Trout's birthday cake from the cake shop mysteriously disappears shortly after Badger opens it, so Simon makes a miniature mashed potato statue of the headmistress as a replacement. Miss Moon spots this and thinks the fairies have cast a spell on Mrs Trout.
15	7	"The Wonky Window"	20 February 1991
Bodger and Badger attempt to repair a wonky window in Mrs Trout's office, without much success.
16	8	"Mr Crusher and the Ninja Zombies From Mars"	27 February 1991
Class Four are not impressed with Miss Moon's pixie prancing in PE class. However, they soon discover that the new PE teacher is a lot worse.
17	9	"The Burglar"	6 March 1991
Bodger and Badger mistake Mrs Trout for a burglar when she puts on a costume for the Mayor's Fancy Dress Ball. But it is not long before a real burglar breaks in to steal the school trophies.
18	10	"Snowflakes in Hawaii"	13 March 1991
It's Hawaiian Day at Letsby Avenue. But the fun day proves not to be, when Mrs Trout cancels the coal delivery.
19	11	"Mavis and the Fingerpoppers"	20 March 1991
Mavis from Troff's Nosherama, who is now a pop star, comes to visit Simon at the school. Everyone is excited to have a pop star on the premises, even Mrs Trout. Mavis hypnotises Badger into singing "Old MacDonald Had A Farm".
20	12	"School's Out"	27 March 1991
As the end of term approaches, Bodger and Badger reminisce about their year at Letsby Avenue. Note: This was the first episode to feature clips from previous episodes.

=== Series Three (1991) ===
Series 3 is still set in Letsby Avenue junior school, but Mrs Trout was fired halfway through the series and Miss Moon became the new temporary headmistress until Mrs Bogart (Mrs Trout's sister) took over as headmistress, when Mrs Trout became a school governor.

The series was broadcast weekly on Tuesdays from 1 October 1991 at 3:55 pm.

No. overall	No. in series	Title	Original release date
21	1	"Mr Valentino and the Rubber Bottom"	1 October 1991
Mr Valentino, the chairman of the school's Governors, has dinner with Mrs Trout who gets a rubber bottom.
22	2	"William Tell"	8 October 1991
Mrs Trout writes, directs and stars in the school play, "William Tell". But will everything be all right on the night? Not likely with Bodger and Badger about.
23	3	"The Head's Anniversary"	15 October 1991
Badger decides to enter Mrs Trout's poetry competition.
24	4	"The Golden Alarm Clock"	22 October 1991
Mr Valentino decides to award Miss Moon a golden alarm clock for not missing a day's school. Mrs Trout is not happy.
25	5	"The New Moon"	29 October 1991
Miss Moon gets a thump on the head and a new view of life. Badger shows her that mash potato is fun to play with.
26	6	"Eamon and the New Headmistress"	5 November 1991
As Mrs Trout has been sent back to teacher training college to learn how to read, the new headmistress Mrs Bogart arrives. She brings along her loathsome nephew, Eamon, to replace Bodger as the school handyman, so Badger and the children try to scare him off.
27	7	"The Mashed Potato Gun"	12 November 1991
A new communication system is set up in the school and Badger makes a mashed potato gun. From this episode this series moved to 3:50pm on original transmission.
28	8	"The Difficult Test"	19 November 1991
Mrs Bogart is determined to make Class 4 sit a difficult test. However, with so many interruptions (mostly from Bodger who is trying to have a fire drill), will it ever happen?
29	9	"The Head's Twin Sister"	26 November 1991
Mrs Bogart will stop at nothing to get hold of Bodger's competition winnings, even posing as her own hard-up identical twin sister!
30	10	"The Baby"	3 December 1991
Miss Moon has agreed to look after her neighbour's baby for the day. Badger, Rocky and Vicky trick Mrs Bogart into eating laxative chocolate.
31	11	"The Doubling Box"	10 December 1991
Mrs Bogart is charging for lost property and keeps stealing the children's possessions to top up on takings. Badger does what he can to stop her.
32	12	"The Class Photo"	17 December 1991
Badger is having a bath because it's time for the class photograph. When the photographer is cancelled, Miss Moon asks Bodger to help out.

=== Series Four (1993) ===
Series 4 featured Bodger and Badger working at Chessington World of Adventures, a theme park in Surrey.

The series was broadcast weekly on Mondays from 13 September 1993 at 3:55 pm.

No. overall	No. in series	Title	Original release date
33	1	"The Arrival"	13 September 1993
Bodger starts a new job as handyman at the Chessington World of Adventures theme park, where no pets are allowed. But Badger is determined to join Bodger, and together the pair meet Holly who hangs about a lot in the park - for free - because her mum works in the kitchens. All seems well until Badger realises that he has not seen any mashed potato in the park.
34	2	"Mr Beasley's Barrow"	20 September 1993
Mr Beasley tries to catch Badger, who is still at the theme park, but is confused as Bodger, Holly and Badger have great fun tricking him.
35	3	"The Tapirs"	27 September 1993
Badger makes friends with some unusual animals, the tapirs.
36	4	"The Elephant's Trunk"	4 October 1993
Bodger fixes the elephant's trunk and Badger tries to hit Mr Beasley with mashed potato. From this episode onwards this series moved to 4:00pm.
37	5	"A Hard Day's Knight"	11 October 1993
Bodger dresses up as a knight, while Badger tries his paw at flying and Holly rescues him.
38	6	"The New Clothes"	18 October 1993
Mr Beasley is issued with a new uniform, but Bodger manages to ruin most of it with the help of Badger and some mashed potato.
39	7	"The Dragon"	25 October 1993
Holly wins a watch at Bodger and Badger's unconventional ball tossing stall, but Mr Beasley takes it from her. Badger thinks of a novel way of getting it back.
40	8	"Wet Paint"	1 November 1993
Mr Beasley sits on a painted bench and tries to reprimand Bodger for not following orders. Instead, Head Office allow Bodger to run the ice-cream cart.
41	9	"Catapult"	8 November 1993
Mr Beasley has finally mastered a plan to catch Badger using a catapult.

=== Series Five (1995) ===
Series 5 to 7 featured Bodger and Badger living in a rented bedsit flat (Exterior scenes were filmed at No. 78 Grove Avenue, Hanwell in London). Badger met his new friend Mousey in Series 5, a mouse who lived under the floorboards. She became a permanent fixture of the programme from that point onwards.

The series was broadcast weekly from 9 January 1995 at 3:45 pm.

No. overall	No. in series	Title	Original release date
42	1	"A Mouse in the House"	9 January 1995
Bodger and Badger are living in a new flat. They think they're alone until Badger makes friends with a mouse who lives under the floorboards.
43	2	"Under The Floorboards"	16 January 1995
Badger finds it hard to visit Mousey under the floorboards, so he thinks of a plan to get under.
44	3	"Wash Day"	23 January 1995
After their new washing machine blows up, Bodger and Badger have to go to the laundrette. Badger causes chaos as usual and the pair accidentally leave Bodger's washing in the laundrette.
45	4	"Mr Selby's Pictures"	30 January 1995
When Bodger accidentally paints a shop sign back to front, Badger finds a quick solution with an electric saw.
46	5	"Ancient Egyptian Mashed Potato"	6 February 1995
Bodger has trouble with two burglars, "Boss" and Courtney, who try to steal a valuable Ancient Egyptian statue which belongs to Bodger's aunt. Badger decides to scare the burglars off by being the ghost of the Egyptian statue.
47	6	"Rent Money"	13 February 1995
When the rent money goes missing, Bodger and Badger are told to move out. Nothing can help them get their flat back - except Mousey.
48	7	"Here Comes Raymond"	20 February 1995
Bodger's old school friend - the greedy Raymond Tompkins - comes to stay, and Badger declares war to scare and get rid of him.
49	8	"Twin Brother"	27 February 1995
Bodger rations the mashed potato, so Badger invents a twin brother in order to get double his portion.
50	9	"The Mashy Mouse"	6 March 1995
When Bodger decides to borrow a cat to get rid of the mouse in the house, Badger and Mousey have to find a way of showing him he was imagining things.
51	10	"Seaside"	13 March 1995
Badger wants to go to the seaside but the weather forecast is bad, so he decides to make his own seaside - in the bathroom.
52	11	"Cosmic Potatoes"	20 March 1995
Badger and Mousey trick Bodger into believing that Martians are under the floorboards.
53	12	"One of Those Days"	27 March 1995
Badger makes a huge amount of mashed potato and then has to find places to store it, then Bodger's computer goes wrong after Badger and Mousey have a go on it.
54	13	"Mad Mash Bash"	3 April 1995
During a race with Mousey, Badger bangs his head and loses his memory. Mousey helps him to remember by reminding him of all of the adventures they have had.

=== Series Six (1996) ===
Bodger, Badger and Mousey are still living at the same flat as featured in series 5. This series mainly featured the pair having problems with their new landlady, Mrs Dribelle, and Elton her sidekick who did all her dirty work. Mrs Dribelle did not allow her tenants to keep animals in her properties, so Bodger always had to hide Badger whenever she came to the flat.

The series was broadcast weekly from 15 January 1996 at 3:55 pm.

No. overall	No. in series	Title	Original release date
55	1	"Mrs Dribelle!"	15 January 1996
Bodger and Badger come face-to-face with their new landlady, the fearsome Mrs Dribelle, whose main objective is to get Bodger out of the flat.
56	2	"Badger in the Box"	22 January 1996
Mrs Dribelle sends her nasty assistant, Elton, to intimidate Bodger into leaving the flat. After Badger hits him on the head with a frying pan, Elton is determined to catch him and get Bodger thrown out for breaking the rule of "No animals allowed."
57	3	"Potty"	29 January 1996
Badger finds Bodger's cactus very amusing as it has been planted in a potty. After an unexpected bump on the head, Badger drives Bodger mad by thinking he's an astronaut or Super Badger.
58	4	"Lottery Lunacy"	5 February 1996
Bodger thinks he has won the lottery, after leaving Badger in charge of writing down the numbers. He later regrets a rude phone call to Mrs Dribelle when he discovers he has not won the lottery after all. Note: An episode of ChuckleVision with the same title aired eight days later.
59	5	"Mrs Dribelle's Mother"	12 February 1996
In an attempt to get Bodger out of her house, Mrs Dribelle pretends to have a sick mother (Elton in drag) who needs his room!
60	6	"Pussy Cake, Pussy Cake"	19 February 1996
Fluffykins (Mrs Dribelle's cat)'s birthday cake is delivered to Bodger and Badger's address. Badger is determined to prove to Mousey that the cake is not a real cat, and ends up destroying it. They then create a substitute cake out of mashed potato, Liquorice Allsorts and baked beans.
61	7	"Diet"	26 February 1996
When Badger gets stuck in his badger flap, Bodger decides it's high time he went on a mash-free diet with a healthy dose of exercise, much to Badger's displeasure.
62	8	"Badger's Bed"	4 March 1996
After finding more of Badger's mashed potato in his clothes drawer, Bodger buys Badger a new bed that turns out to be a baby's cot. Meanwhile, Elton is still determined to catch Badger and show him to Mrs Dribelle. Note: Location work for part of this episode was shot in and around Ravenscourt Park, Goldhawk Road, West London.
63	9	"The Countess of Skegness"	11 March 1996
Bodger loses his rent money and tries to make amends by washing Mrs Dribelle's car, but unintentionally covers it in mashed potato after getting the water buckets mixed up. Later on, Mrs Dribelle's attempt to welcome the Countess of Skegness gets ruined thanks to Badger.
64	10	"Overdue"	18 March 1996
Bodger receives a letter from the library saying that he has an overdue book and now must return it. Unfortunately, Badger lent it to Mousey who converted it into a mattress.
65	11	"Badger's Party"	25 March 1996
Mrs Dribelle tries tricking Bodger with a document to get him out of the flat. Fortunately, thanks to Badger, Bodger signs the other side of the document saying that he can stay in the flat for as long as he wants. Now Badger has to stop Elton from getting it back.
66	12	"Around the World with Badger and Mousey"	27 March 1996
Before Badger and Mousey set off on their round-the-world trip, they take a look back at some of the adventures they have had that year.

=== Series Seven (1996–1997) ===
Series 7 returned to the format of more everyday adventures, and new characters moved into the flat upstairs, including a slimy trickster called Mr Smart and Mrs Dribelle's niece, Vicky. This was the longest-running series, running for six months with a clip show halfway through the series and another at the end.

The series was broadcast weekly from 9 September 1996 at 3:55 pm.

No. overall	No. in series	Title	Original release date
67	1	"Jungle Fever"	9 September 1996
Bodger has become Mrs Dribelle's handyman, and she gives him the task of looking after her plants and doing plant removing. Meanwhile, Badger causes chaos by turning the house into a jungle and the garden into a desert.
68	2	"Catnapped"	16 September 1996
Someone threatens to kidnap Mrs Dribelle's cat Fluffykins. Bodger agrees to look after the cat while she finds a detective, so Mousey leaves home in protest.
69	3	"Here Comes Smarty Pants!"	23 September 1996
Mrs Dribelle has a sneaky new tenant, Alec Smart, who always has plenty of dishonest money-making schemes. When he notices Bodger's expensive camera, Mr Smart tricks him into swapping it for some false stain remover. Badger then comes up with a clever idea to get it back.
70	4	"Funny Money"	30 September 1996
Mr Smart starts forging money by simply photocopying £50 notes, which he intends to use by buying the house off Mrs Dribelle. Badger tries to cheer Simon up with practical jokes.
71	5	"Wet Paint!"	7 October 1996
Mr Smart comes up with another devious scheme in selling Mrs Dribelle a painting, which turns out to be more of Badger's doing with mashed potato.
72	6	"Gnome From Gnome"	14 October 1996
Mrs Dribelle's garden gnomes are going missing. The culprit, of course, is Mr Smart who is stealing all the gnomes in the area hoping to make a profit. Badger and Mousey make a mashed potato satellite.
73	7	"Mrs Dribelle's Big Day"	21 October 1996
Mr Smart pretends to be the wealthy "Baron of Billericay" and proposes to Mrs Dribelle with a fake ring. Now Bodger must stop her from making a big mistake.
74	8	"World Badger Day"	28 October 1996
Badger is bored so he decides to make a holiday of his own called "World Badger Day" - a time when everyone has to be nice to all badgers (and mice).
75	9	"Mrs Dribelle and The Queen"	4 November 1996
Mrs Dribelle is going to a pageant dressed as the Queen and Bodger gets roped into being her servant for the day. Mousey thinks she'll be going off to live in Buckingham Palace.
76	10	"Wotcha Vicky!"	11 November 1996
Badger makes a new friend when Mrs Dribelle's niece, Vicky, moves in upstairs. She is a drummer and loves mashed potato, but Mrs Dribelle is constantly making her miserable.
77	11	"Radio Competition"	18 November 1996
Bodger and Badger help Vicky write a song for the radio, but the words do not come out as expected and Mrs Dribelle ends up winning. NOTE: This was the last episode of Bodger and Badger to be repeated on BBC One, on Friday 29 September 2006 at 3:25pm. CBBC Channel repeats continued until 2008.
78	12	"Monkey Trouble"	25 November 1996
Vicky goes to the market and gets a drumming job, where she has to dress up as a gorilla. So Bodger and Badger go to the market, but the gorilla outfit annoys Mrs Dribelle.
79	13	"Say Cheese!"	2 December 1996
When Mousey chews through Mrs Dribelle's best dress, there's trouble ahead.
80	14	"Vicky is a Hit"	9 December 1996
Vicky applies for a job as a drummer and prepares to go for an interview. But she needs Bodger and Badger's help to make sure Mrs Dribelle does not know.
81	15	"Mashy Christmas Everybody"	16 December 1996
Badger and Mousey celebrate Christmas and remember some of their adventures that year.
82	16	"Mashy Music"	1 January 1997
Vicky does not get the drumming job, so she sells her drum kit. Badger and Mousey buy it and try to cheer her up by forming a band, but they need a drummer. NOTE: This episode was unusual in that it had its first transmission in a morning slot, instead of the usual afternoon slot. This was because BBC1 only had a morning CBBC strand on this date.
83	17	"Good Luck Vicky"	6 January 1997
Mrs Dribelle tries to make Vicky work on her last afternoon, but she has other plans.
84	18	"Too Close For Comfort"	13 January 1997
Mrs Dribelle moves into the flat upstairs and Bodger sticks her wallpaper on with mashed potato by mistake. Then Badger and Mousey pretend to be ghosts to frighten her.
85	19	"The Mashy Mushtake"	20 January 1997
Badger and Mousey get things mixed up, including Mrs Dribelle's beauty cream and some mashed potato.
86	20	"While The Cat's Away"	27 January 1997
Badger and Mousey try to trap a cat burglar that has broken into the flat.
87	21	"Mrs Dribelle's Dancing Partner"	3 February 1997
Mrs Dribelle is learning to dance so her friend Hubert can take her to a ball. In desperate need of practice, she forces Bodger to help her out. Meanwhile, Bodger's shower is not working, so he has to use Mrs Dribelle's while she's out.
88	22	"Vote For Me - Or Else!"	10 February 1997
Mrs Dribelle stands for the town council election - but will anyone vote for her?
89	23	"Cuckoo"	17 February 1997
After Bodger inherits a grandfather clock, Badger and Mousey decide to turn it into a cuckoo clock.
90	24	"The Mash Baaa-sh"	24 February 1997
When Badger cannot sleep, Mousey suggests that he count sheep. Meanwhile, Bodger has an important meeting with Mrs Dribelle which goes horribly wrong when he leaves without his trousers.
91	25	"On The Blink"	3 March 1997
Bodger gets a letter telling him the video he sent of himself reading poems is going to be on the programme 'Say Cheese', but he runs into problems trying to watch it on TV and things are made worse when Badger records over the original footage of what he sent in.
92	26	"Pasta Masha"	10 March 1997
Badger has a visit from his Italian friend Luigi, a fellow badger who enjoys hurling spaghetti.
93	27	"Clay Days"	17 March 1997
Bodger enters a pottery competition, but he does not expect Mousey to be in the pot.
94	28	"The Time Masheen"	24 March 1997
Badger and Mousey travel back in time to relive some of their favourite adventures.

=== Series Eight (1997–1998) ===
Series 8 and 9 featured Bodger and Badger running a Bed & Breakfast hotel in the fictional seaside town of Puddleford (location filming for series 8 and 9 took place around Brighton).

The series was broadcast weekly from 15 December 1997 at 4:00 pm, with a one week gap during Christmas.

No. overall	No. in series	Title	Original release date
95	1	"A Smart Start"	15 December 1997
Bodger, Badger and Mousey arrive in Puddleford to run the Seagull's Rest Bed and Breakfast. But they had not counted on the sneaky Alec Smart running the hotel next door to theirs.
96	2	"Well Spotted"	22 December 1997
Mr Smart is trying to steal all of Bodger's hotel guests, but Badger and Mousey have other plans and use spots of red paint to get them back.
97	3	"Peace and Quiet"	5 January 1998
An unpleasant guest named Miss Peake comes to Seagull's Rest for a nice quiet holiday, but Badger's antics make it impossible.
98	4	"The Extra-Terrestrial Toothbrush"	12 January 1998
After a horrid stay from the night before, Miss Peake decides to leave Seagull's Rest and go somewhere else. Mr Smart immediately pounces on her and tries to persuade her to stay at his hotel. Bodger decides to make a trifle to make it up to her. When the trifle starts moving around in the kitchen, Bodger and Miss Peake think it has been taken over by aliens - but Badger knows better.
99	5	"Hat Ahoy!"	19 January 1998
Miss Peake's sun hat goes missing because Mousey decides it's perfect for a boat, so Bodger and Badger have to get it back.
100	6	"Seaweed Bay"	26 January 1998
Badger and Mousey lead Miss Peake and Mr Smart on a wild goose chase as they hunt for the legendary "Pirate treasure of Puddleford."
101	7	"Fancy That"	2 February 1998
Bodger and Millie persuade Miss Peake to enter the fancy dress competition on the last day of her holiday at Seagull's Rest.
102	8	"Water Laugh"	9 February 1998
Bodger and Badger try to compete with Mr Smart's amazing garden decorations for the upcoming gardening competition.
103	9	"The Potato Patch"	16 February 1998
Badger has his eye on Mr Smart's potatoes - and when Smart cheats Bodger out of £20, Badger puts more than his eye on the potatoes.
104	10	"Doggone"	23 February 1998
Badger finds a lost dog called China, so he, Bodger and Millie decide to return him to his owner. However, after hearing about the reward for finding the dog, Mr Smart tries to steal China for himself.
105	11	"Automashic"	2 March 1998
New guests Mr Tucknott and Mrs Bobbins arrive at Seagull's Rest which is being taken over by robots who sound uncannily like Badger and Mousey.
106	12	"Mashy Record Breakers"	9 March 1998
Who do you think holds the record for making the biggest mess with mashed potato? Meanwhile, Mr Tucknott gets nervous about writing a speech to perform in front of the other bank managers.
107	13	"Big Bear"	16 March 1998
Is Mrs Bobbins' toy bear really a toy bear - or is it Badger in disguise?
108	14	"Mash Cash"	23 March 1998
Badger and Mousey cause chaos when they think Mr Tucknott has stolen Mrs Bobbins' money, but he is only trying to help.
109	15	"Splosh!"	30 March 1998
Badger and Mousey form their own fire brigade and rig up fire extinguishers (ceiling-hung balloons full of mashed potato) in the hotel.

=== Series Nine (1998–1999) ===
Series 9 continued with the setting of series 8, with Bodger still running his hotel with Badger and Mousey in tow.

According to Andy Cunningham, the programme ended when the Head of BBC Children's Programmes, Christopher Pilkington (who had initially commissioned the show in 1989) left his post. Cunningham did not mind, as he said he was struggling for inspiration for things to do with mashed potato towards the end of the show's run. Reference Vaux, Garry (2012). Legends of Kids TV 2. UK: GJB Publishing. pp. 59–60. ISBN 9780956334374.

The series was broadcast weekly from 14 December 1998 at 3:55 pm.

No. overall	No. in series	Title	Original release date
110	1	"Hello Mrs Melly"	14 December 1998
The mean-spirited Mrs S. Melly is the new Tourist Information Officer in Puddleford, and immediately takes a dislike to Bodger. To make matters worse, Badger has left the hotel in a mess when she comes round for an inspection.
111	2	"Poster Potatoes"	21 December 1998
After Mrs Melly refuses to add Seagull's Rest to her Good Hotel Guide, Bodger and Badger decide to do some advertising of their own. This episode was moved to 4:00pm owing to an episode of Due South being scheduled earlier that day.
112	3	"A Twitch in Time"	4 January 1999
Miss Piper, an elderly birdwatcher, comes to stay at Seagull's Rest hoping to spot a rare bird. Unfortunately, she reveals this to Mrs Melly, who has an idea to catch the rare bird so she can charge people to see it.
113	4	"A Whale of a Time"	11 January 1999
Bodger decides to make a video advertising Seagull's Rest. But it all goes wrong when Badger and Mousey want to make their own film.
114	5	"The Great Escape"	18 January 1999
Trainee Bank Manager Mr Wilson comes to stay at Seagull's Rest. Unfortunately, he gets locked in the bathroom when he has a serious interview to go to, thanks to Mousey.
115	6	"Hundreds and Thousands"	25 January 1999
Mrs Melly mistakes Bodger's telephone conversation for winning the lottery and starts being nice to him, thinking he's won hundreds and thousands of pounds.
116	7	"Mr Wilson's Bathing Trunks"	1 February 1999
Mr Wilson has a job interview to attend, but beforehand he decides to go for a swim. Things go awry when Mrs Melly takes his clothes away while he's swimming and refuses to give them back.
117	8	"Green Potatoes"	8 February 1999
Bodger's new green towel gets ruined thanks to Mousey, so Badger makes another one by covering a white one with green paint, but they had not counted on Mrs Melly using it.
118	9	"A Mashy Romance"	15 February 1999
P.E teacher Mr Gripper arrives to stay at Seagull's Rest. He comes across Mrs Melly and immediately falls in love with her. Meanwhile, Badger and Mousey bottle mashed potato soup, some of which ends up in a suntan lotion bottle.
119	10	"China Comes To Stay"	22 February 1999
Millie leaves China with Bodger and Badger to look after him for a day.
120	11	"Pop"	1 March 1999
While watching a film on the TV, Bodger receives a Sodastream fizzy pop machine in the post and sets about making fizzy pop, but Badger and Mousey decide to make fizzy mash with Millie's empty milk bottles. When the corks shoot off the bottles, Bodger and Mr Wilson believe it's gunshots and that the hotel is being raided by bank robbers.
121	12	"Ready, Steady, Go"	8 March 1999
A bullying Mr Gripper challenges Mr Wilson to a running race around the sea front, but when Badger and Mousey see him cheating, they decide to stop him from winning.
122	13	"Mrs Melly Investigates"	15 March 1999
After finding rabbits in another hotel in Puddleford, Mrs Melly decides to find out once and for all what is happening at Bodger's hotel. Badger thinks Mrs Melly is a burglar and sets all the anti-burglar devices off.
123	14	"Puddleford Day"	22 March 1999
It's a special day of dressing up in Puddleford, as it's the day when Queen Elizabeth I visited their town, only Badger has other plans for this day including ruining Mrs Melly's poem.
124	15	"Mashy Museum"	29 March 1999
Badger, Mousey and China show a various amount of items that remind them, of memories from the previous episodes, of how much fun they had.
