= Billy Cowie =

Scottish choreographer and composer

Billy Cowie is a Scottish writer, choreographer, and composer born in 1954 who works mostly in the areas of live performance, installation and screen dance. He composes the music for all his works and this has been recorded by Marie McLaughlin, Nicola Hall, Gerard McChrystal and Rowan Godel. His writing includes the texts for over twenty performances, novels, a book of poems and two dance textbooks.

== Writing ==
Passenger is a novel from 2007 which circles around a case of fetus in fetu. The book has been released in Italian as Due in Uno and in French as L'Incluse.

Moonking Trilogy (2019) is a set of three science fiction novels written for young adults.

Anarchic Dance (2006) is a dance textbook analysing Divas dance work edited by Cowie and Aggiss and featuring three chapters on choreographic techniques by Cowie, as well as essays by Deborah Levy, Donald Hutera, Sherril Dodds, Claudia Kappenberg, Marion Kant, Valerie Briginshaw and Carol Brown.

Poetic Dance (2021) is a choreographic handbook detailing Cowie's poetic approach to choreography and featuring extensive casebook studies with accompanying video extracts. The book is also available in Spanish under the title Danza Poetica. Susana Temperly commented in her review of the book the following.

Cowie's work is a contribution that, as a response, joins the general trend in the field of movement arts to demand erudition, based on the premise that the act of knowing is increasingly urgent. Furthermore, this urgency demands a practical method of knowledge geared toward implementation of the same level of practicality. The elements that Cowie presents to us are nothing other than the pillars for a good poetic choreography, and this, in turn, consists of a mode of discovery that operates on bewilderment and anarchic pleasure, sensations that can only be generated by surprise.

Poems (2017) is a book of Cowie's poems, many of which have been used in his choreographies and installations including Under Flat Sky and Tangos Cubanos.

== Choreography ==
From 1982 to 2002 Cowie was artistic director, choreographer and composer (with Liz Aggiss) for The Wild Wigglers (performances at ICA, Wembley Arena and Le Zenith Paris) and Divas Dance (formed 1985, performances at the ICA, Queen Elizabeth Hall, The Place, Purcell Room, Lilian Bayliss). Since 2006 he has focused on making stereoscopic dance installations, dance film and a series of live dance commissions from companies and festivals in Cuba, Italy, Korea and Japan.

Under Flat Sky (2014) was commissioned by the Museum of Art, Kochi, Japan, featuring five Japanese dancers performing in front of a panoramic, moving, visual display by Silke Mansholt. These video projections as well as forming rich multidimensional scenes (the images appear on both the front and back of the dancers' transparent costumes, on their bodies themselves and on the screen) also inform the choreography allowing the dancers to move and fall even when stationary and in the final scene to be physically crushed by the descending sky.

Edge of Nowhere (2015) is a thirty minute solo dance performance made for Rajyashree Ramamurthi which premiered at the Edinburgh Fringe Festival.

Tangos Cubanos (2015) was commissioned by Danza Contemporanea de Cuba and is a thirty minute ballet for twenty dancers with video projections by Silke Mansholt. The work toured Europe in 2016 "rich in creative ideas and possessing a boundary-pushing expressiveness... simultaneously, everything appears effortless, almost meditative – a breathtaking artistic device."

Shakespeare Needs You (2016) was commissioned by the Festival B:om in Korea and the British Council as part of their global 'Shakespeare Lives' programme and features two Korean dancers and musician Kim C.

La Tragedia di Eponima (2016) is a full length dance theatre work commissioned by the Civica Scuolo di Teatro Paolo Grassi.

Attraverso I Muri Di Bruma (2016) was commissioned by the Fondazione Prada in Milan and is a two and a half-hour site-specific dance performance that took place simultaneously in seven locations of the Fondazione. During the event the audience was free to navigate their own path around the spaces viewing the looping events for as long as they wished and in any order. The event culminated in a thirty minute choreography bringing together all eleven dancers to perform against the mirror wall of the Fondazione with their own reflections.

Danzas de Amor Que se Fue (2019) is Cowie's second commission from Danza Contemporanea de Cuba and is a thirty minute ballet for ten dancers based on texts by Lorca. Jorge Brooks, manager of the company, said of the work,

Love (one of the characters) left and never returned, and this conflict triggers a series of events that fuel the choreography under Billy Cowie's unique vision. The piece blends flamenco with contemporary elements, is full of passion, and requires great precision to ensure nothing is left unsaid.

Solos Extr3mos, (2024) is a suite of three solos dance pieces made for Luciana Croatto which premiered at Teatro Colon, Beunos Aires in 2024. The three linked solos are La Mujer Tambien en Casa – a German language lesson exploring sexist language, De le Alto de Edificios Altos – a series of choreographed poems looking at love and death ("the most subtle and bereft solo of the three... lost in sadness and solitude. A body leaning over an abyss, counting on nothing but itself to keep from falling") and Amor Inquieto – set to five lieder with texts by Goethe.

In 2007 Cowie was artist in residence at the 18th Street Arts Centre, Los Angeles, and for his multiple presentations in Italy the British Council gave Cowie the New Connections Award in 2015. In 2012 the Baryshnikov Centre in New York held a retrospective of Cowie's work.

== Stereoscopic dance installations ==
Since Cowie's first steresocopic dance work, Men in the Wall (2004) he has made many 3D dance pieces – "Billy Cowie is the Godfather of 3D dance movies," Giles Jobin. Since 2006 he has been developing a new form of stereoscopic dance installations where it seems to the audience that the dancers are not behind the screen but inhabiting the same space they are in. To the spectators, wearing 3d glasses (either polarised, anaglyph or shutter) the life size dancers can often appear indistinguishable from live performers.

In the Flesh (2007) features the dancer Sara Popowa who appears to be sitting on a carpet directly in front of the viewer, and won the Delegates Prize at the 2007 IMZ Festival in Den Hague.

Ghosts in the Machine (2009) is a twenty five-minute looping stereocopic installation featuring three performers – Jennifer Potter, Rachel Blackman and Victoria Melody commissioned by Lighthouse Brighton.

Tango de Soledad (2011) was commissioned by South East Dance with support from Jerwood Charitable Foundation and Esmee Fairbairn Foundation and Arts Council England, and features dancer Amy Hollingsworth who is dancing against a black wall inscribed with chalk drawings by Silke Mansholt. Mary Brennan reviewed the work in the Herald –

There's wonderful craft in Cowie's illusions, but in the solitary dancing of Amy Hollingsworth in Tango de Soledad there is a profound reflection on the rituals we revisit when love, or a tango partner, has gone. And maybe we feel like that absent partner, voyeuristically observing the lonely beauty, the elegant resolve of a dancer who is, in every sense, out of our reach.

T'es pas la seule (2011) is a set of three pieces for children with texts by Robert Desnos. It features four stereoscopic dancers all played by the Argentinian dancer Mariana di Silverio and premiered at Danca em Fuoco in São Paulo.

Jenseits (2012) was commissioned by Teatro a Corte (Turin) and South East Dance and premiered at the Art Museum Rivoli. It is a twelve minute installation duet for two virtual dancers both played by Oxana Panchenko who dance on two vertical (virtual) white ladders. The ladders on the one hand are symbolic of transition and death (Jenseits refers to the afterlife in German) but also function choreographically by defining the spaces the dancers' limbs inhabit in a similar way to that in which a musical scale allows the listener to interpret melody. A paired series of visual images by the German artist Silke Mansholt are projected onto the dancers, ladders and background progressing throughout the piece to blackness. It was presented as part of Dance Umbrella in 2013.

Art of Movement (2013) was commissioned by the Kyoto Experiment Festival, Japan and features live dancers performing alongside the virtual 3D dancers. The virtual performers are played by Yumiko Minami, Tomohiko Kyougoku, Kaori Ito and Kazuko Hohki and the real dancers are performers from the countries it tours to (Mexico, Korea, Egypt, Denmark, Croatia, Cuba, Japan). The work won the Prix de Jury at the 6e Festival Culturel International de la Danse Contemporaine in Algiers.

In addition to specially made stereoscopic dace works Cowie has adapted some of his live choreographies into this format thus allowing the work to be seen globally without the expense of touring companies. In addition the work can in this way be seen closer and in much greater detail than in the theatre and can also be viewed multiple times in looping installations. Works adapted this way include Tangos Cubanos, Under Flat Sky, and Edge of Nowhere. Two collections have been made of these excerpts along with original stereoscopic works – Echte Fälshungen (Genuine Fakes) 2017 in portrait format and Ersatz Originale (Substitute Originals) 2019 in landscape format.

== Dance film ==
Beethoven in Love (1991) is a fifteen minute dance film which was commissioned by BBC 2 and directed by Bob Bentley.

Motion Control (2002) is an eight-minute dance film commissioned by BBC2 which was directed by David Anderson The film was the winner of the Czech Crystal Golden Prague Television Awards 2002, Special Jury Golden Award World FilmFest Houston 2003, Best Female Film Mediawaves 2003 Hungary.

Tango Brasileiro (2015) was commissioned by Channel 4 and Brazilian TV and made in collaboration with Gabriela Alcofra. The film uses archive footage of 1930's Beunos Aires into which is inserted contemporary footage of Alcofra who appears to be interacting and dancing with the Brazilian citizens.

Cinco Retratos (2023) is a thirty minute looping black and white installation/film made in collaboration with Gabriela Alcofra that premiered at Kronenboden Gallery in Berlin.

In 2018 Fiver International Videodance Festival in Logroño awarded Cowie the Artist of the Year Prize and in 2023 the Pool Movement Art Festival in Berlin awarded him the Pearls Artist Prize.

== Music ==
Cowie's musical compositions are dominated by song and include ten song cycles with texts by Verlaine, MacDiarmid, Mansholt, Lorca, Goethe, Desnos and himself. His instrumental works include Canciónes para Guitarra written for Nicola Hall and Romances and Toccatas for Saxophone written for Gerard McChrystal.

Between 2009 and 2013 Cowie was commissioned by the Wapping Project to make ten scores for installations by various artists including Karen Stucke, Mark Woods and Yohji Yamamoto.

In 2001 BBC Radio commissioned Cowie to write the music for Shakespeare's The Tempest with Philip Madoc and Nina Wadia and in 2003 for Philip Pullman's Dark Materials Trilogy with Terence Stamp, His Dark Materials#Adaptions.
