= J. H. Stead =

English music hall comedian

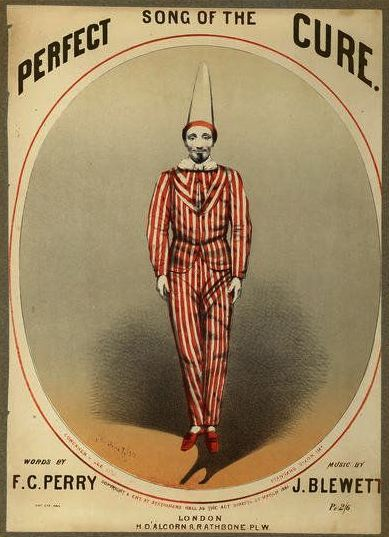
- Sheet music cover, showing Stead jumping into the air
- Born: James Hurst Stead c. 1826; Kingston upon Hull, Yorkshire
- Died: 24 January 1886 (aged c. 60); London
- Occupation(s): Comedian, singer
- Years active: 1850s–1880s

James Hurst Stead (c. 1826 – 24 January 1886) was an English music hall comedian, popular for several decades from the 1850s.

== Biography ==
He was born in Kingston upon Hull, Yorkshire, and by the 1850s was performing in music halls around the country. In 1856 he was billed as "the greatest Buffo Comic Singer in England". His songs included "Pop Goes the Weasel", "I’ve Joined the Teetotal Society", "That Blessed Baby", and "The Great Sensation Song", but his reputation rests on "The Perfect Cure". The song was written by Frederick C. Perry, to a tune by Jonathan Blewitt which had previously been used for another song, "The Monkey and the Nuts". The phrase "perfect cure" was a slang term at the time for a "curiosity", or eccentric person.

The song's opening verse (out of ten) and chorus went:

Young Love he plays some funny tricks with us unlucky elves,
So gentlemen, I pray look out, and take care of yourselves,
For once I met a nice young maid, looking so demure,
All at once to me she said, 'You’re a perfect cure …'

A cure, a cure, a cure, a cure,
Now isn’t I a cure,
For here I go,
My high gee wo [i.e. horse],
For I’m a perfect cure....

In his early performances of the song, Stead wore "a long black coat, large white neckcloth, gaiters, and large rimmed low black hat; in fact the costume of a French curé – the chorus being sung after the Quaker fashion, with the raising and lowering of the body. It was very funny, and he used to meet with great applause…". Later, he dressed in a striped suit and dunce's cap like a French circus clown. Alfred Rosling Bennett wrote that, when Stead performed the song, "he sprang a couple of feet in the air at every bar, and never paused for some ten minutes. The words were the merest drivel, the attraction consisting solely in the eccentric appearance of the singer, his antics, agility and endurance." In each chorus, he would jump several times into the air, stiff-legged like a marionette, his arms held closely to his side. He is said to have jumped up and down 400 times in each performance, and sometimes performed it in four different venues in the course of one night.

Bennett wrote that, around 1860, Stead's performances "raged through the land like influenza". In 1869, Henry C. Lunn of The Musical Times reviewed his performance:

Mr. J. H. Stead … sang and danced the composition which has made his reputation – the ‘Perfect Cure.’ Mr. Stead is usually described as ‘the man who never stood still;’ and indeed, seeing that he has jumped into so good a thing, there is no reason why he should relax his efforts as long as the public will pay to see him, and his muscular system will hold out. Abstractedly, there is nothing either pleasing or amusing in seeing a full-grown man, in a striped suit and an eccentric cap, bounding up and down like an India-rubber ball, whilst he is trying to sing. But it is clever, nevertheless; and, although we do not sympathise with his ‘line of endeavour,’ as Carlyle says, we can at least praise him for his industry.

Stead continued to perform the song into the early 1880s. His success led to the production of trick puppets in his likeness, for use in travelling shows, dancing to the tune of "The Perfect Cure". The tune itself became a popular fiddle tune at barn dances, often thought of incorrectly as a traditional Norfolk jig.

Stead became ill with a chest condition in 1884, developed "symptoms of serious mental aberration", and died in 1886. Benefit concerts were arranged for his family, but after it was discovered that he had accumulated savings of some £3,000, a considerable sum at the time, the money raised was returned to the donors. He was buried at St Pancras Cemetery on 2 February 1886, where "a large number of residents of Camden Town" assembled in his honour.

Stead's act was one of the inspirations of the 1980s dance group, the Wild Wigglers, created by Liz Aggiss and Billy Cowie. Like Stead, the dancers wore tall pointy hats.
