= Jane Bassett =

British actress

- Occupations: Actress, Writer
- Years active: 1990s–present
- Notable work: Mousey in Bodger & Badger

Jane Bassett is an actress and TV writer. To date, her only TV work has been on the CBBC children's programme Bodger and Badger, starring and writing in Series 5 from 1995 until the series ended in 1999. She played and voiced the puppet mouse, Mousey and also Millie the Milkwoman, she also played Daphne in the episode "Cuckoo" in episode 23 of series 7. She reprised her role as Mousey on a Comic Relief Special in 1997.

== Personal life ==
Bassett was in a long-term relationship with Bodger & Badger co-star Andy Cunningham. They later separated but remained good friends.
