= Andy Cunningham (actor) =

English actor and puppeteer (1950–2017)

- Born: 13 May 1950; Sutton Coldfield, Warwickshire, England
- Died: 5 June 2017 (aged 67); Brighton, East Sussex, England
- Occupations: Actor, Writer
- Years active: 1970s–2015
- Notable work: Bodger & Badger (1989–1999)
- Children: 1

Andrew Cunningham (13 May 1950 – 5 June 2017) was an English actor, puppeteer, ventriloquist and writer. He was the creator and main writer of the children's BBC television series Bodger & Badger, in which he acted as the likeable but accident-prone Simon Bodger and his pet, Badger.

== Personal life ==
Cunningham studied at the University of Cambridge, where he read English. He dropped out of this course at the end of the second of its three years, citing academic pressures as the reason for doing so, but later completed his degree at the University of Reading. By the mid-1990s, he was in a long-term relationship with co-star Jane Bassett who played Millie the Milkwoman and voiced Mousey in Bodger & Badger. They later separated but remained good friends. He also had a daughter, Phoebe, from a previous relationship.

== Career ==
Before entering the acting profession and entertainment industry, he was an English teacher, then a social worker.

After a while Andy began to explore magic conventions and it was at one in Brighton where - after spending a considerable amount of time having trouble getting past the doorman - he ordered by mail order a puppet called "Benji the Adorable Puppy" (which he named "China" after the Cockney slang "china plate", meaning "mate" – later to be used as China the Dog in Bodger and Badger). When this puppet arrived, he found himself being able to operate the puppet dog naturally and was able to ad-lib routines and comments in a way that he wasn't comfortable with doing with the ventriloquist's doll (which he named Douglas). Soon after, he gave up his day job to turn this hobby into a full-time job, alongside his work with the Covent Garden Community Theatre (with whom he held various positions, including acting). It was while working as a director here that he gave comedian Julian Clary his first big break.

Another act he developed was of a three-headed man named "Freeman, Hardy and Willis".

By the early 1980s, Andy had a regular income to supplement his magician and Community Theatre Group work as a handyman at a West London school, a job to which he admitted himself that he was entirely unsuited.

In 1986, Andy wrote a children's book featuring Mr Bodger and Magritte the rat entitled "Mr Bodger's Jumping Hat". Also during this time, Roland Rat became popular on TV-am's breakfast television ITV franchise and many people in London who knew Andy because of his work with Magritte either began thinking that Andy had stolen the idea of a badly-behaved talking rat puppet from Roland Rat or confused Magritte with Roland, thinking Andy was Roland's puppeteer. It was also during this period when Andy made his only (uncredited) big-screen film performances in Star Wars: Return of the Jedi.

== Death ==
Cunningham died of duodenal cancer on 5 June 2017 at Royal Sussex County Hospital. He did not regain consciousness after undergoing emergency stomach surgery, related to his cancer.
