= Weapon dance =

Form of dance using weapons

A weapon dance employs weapons—or stylized versions of weapons—traditionally used in combat in order to simulate, recall, or reenact combat or the moves of combat in the form of dance, usually for some ceremonial purpose. Such dancing is quite common to folk ritual in many parts of the world. Weapon dancing is certainly ancient; among the earliest historical references we have are those that refer to the pyrrhichios, a weapon dance in ancient Sparta, in which the dance was used as a kind of ritual training for battle.

Related to weapon dances and war dances is the dance of the hunt. A very early reference to a weapon dance of the hunt comes in the form of a rock carving at Çatal Höyük, the large neolithic settlement in south-central Anatolia. It depicts a hunting ritual involving dancers holding their bows; one figure has a bow in each hand, two perform artistic leaps and another holds a horn-shaped stick and is striking a frame drum.

== Examples ==
=== Europe ===
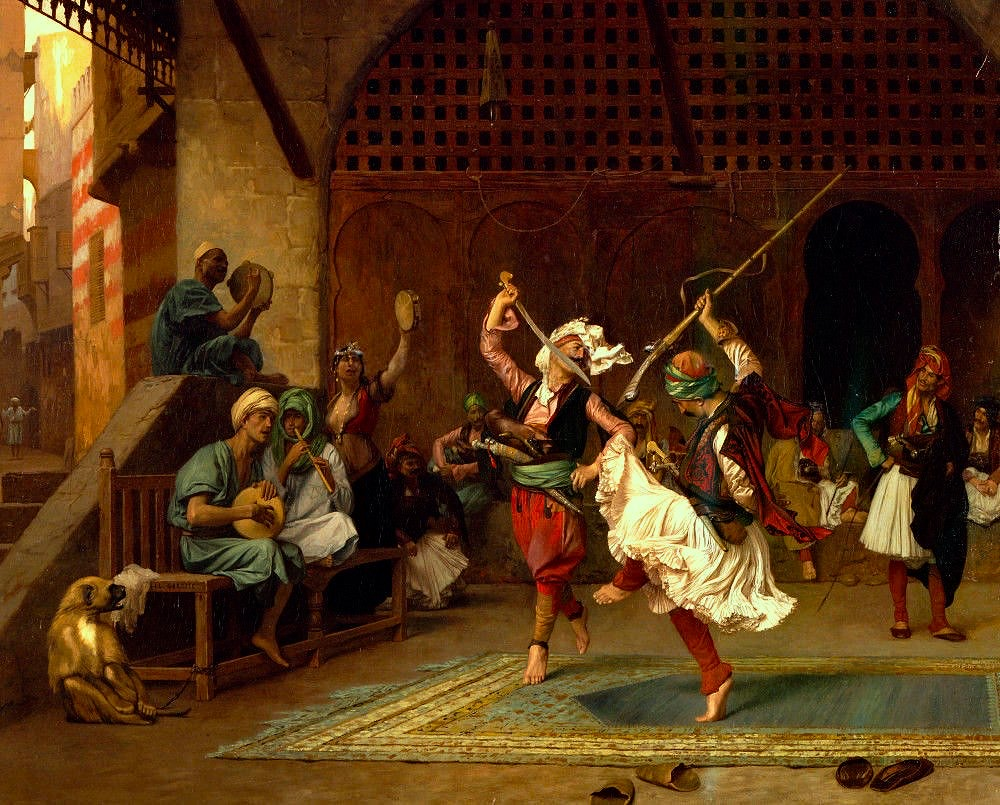
The Sword Dance (1890) by Paja Jovanović (left); The Sword Dance (1885) by Jean-Léon Gérôme (right). They are representations of Albanian weapon dances.

Early examples of sword and spear dances can be found amongst the Germanic tribes of Northern Europe, such as those mentioned by Tacitus, the Norse peoples and the Anglo-Saxon tribes. Sutton Hoo is thought to show figures dancing with spears.

Other references to such traditions include that in Constantine VII Porphrogenitus’ Book of Ceremonies (from c. 953) which describes the Varangian Guard (a group made up of Norsemen and later English and Anglo-Danish warriors) dancing in two circles, with some wearing skins or masks, along with chants of “Toúl!” and clashing staves on shields.

Sword dances exist in some parts of Europe. The weapon may be used to act out mock combat during the dance, or may be incorporated as an element of the dance, intertwining with other swords. In some places, sticks are used instead of swords. Iberian stick dances (paulitos, paloteos, ball de bastons) display two opposite rows of dancers. A common sword dance in Europe is the moresca in Spain, in which the dance recalls the Reconquista from the 12th to 15th centuries. The gun parade of the Moros y cristianos also celebrates these battles, as does the British morris dance.

In North Macedonia and Northern Italy, weapon dances may be used to exorcise evil spirits before a wedding. Sabre dancing exists in the Balkans; the most famous is Albanian, where two male rivals simulate a duel over a woman. The Galician jogo do pau involves two rivals with long sticks. Other weapons, such as axes (or wooden versions thereof) may be used in some places. Lance dances, dagger dances, and even rifle dances are in parts of Europe.

In the Scottish Highlands, some dances used the lochaber axe, the broadsword, targe and dirk, and the flail. The Highland dance resembles a combative dance similar to those of Indonesian pencak silat, which has the performer executing knife techniques combined with wrestling-style kicks, trips, and sweeps.

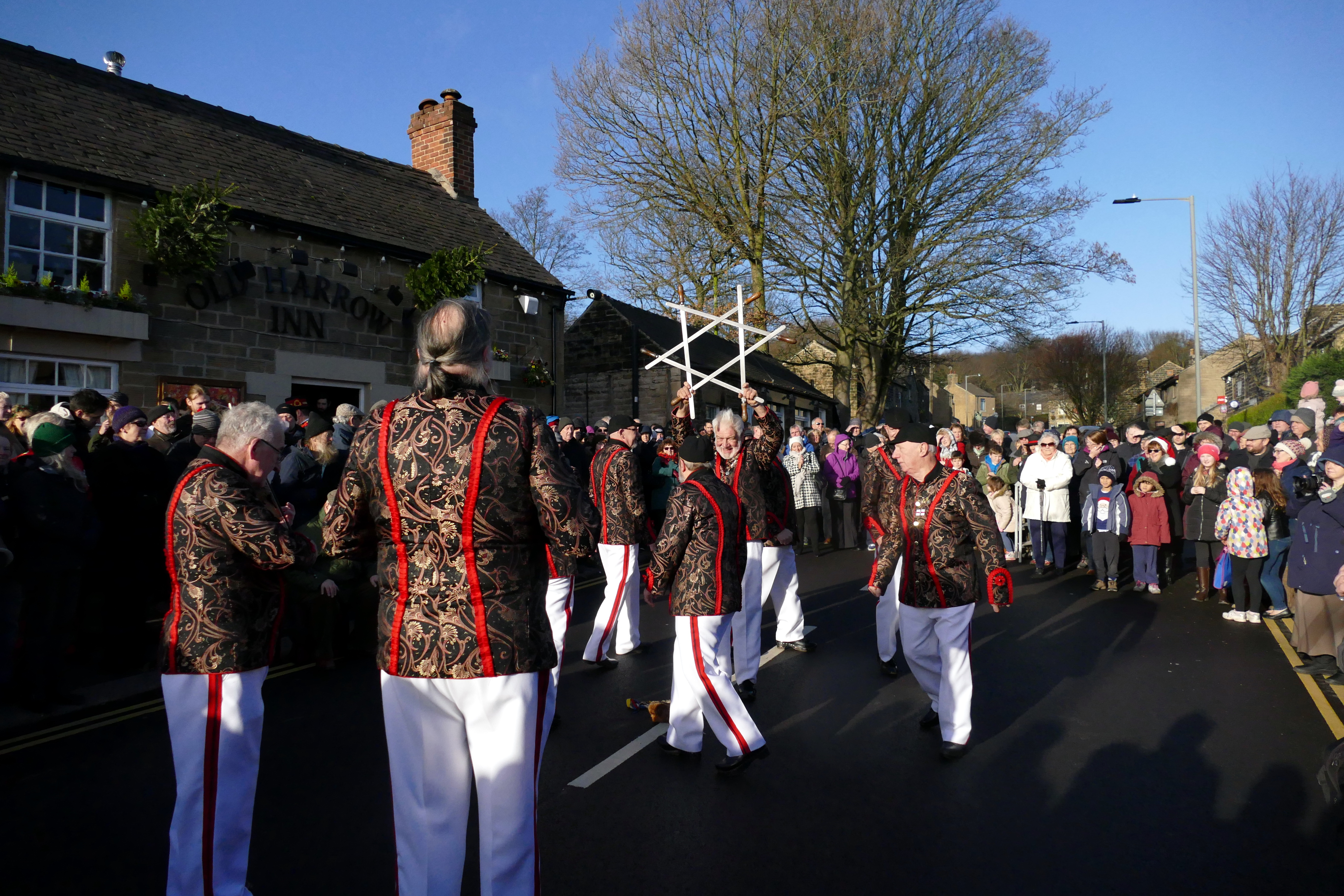
Boxing Day 2016 – The Grenoside Sword Dance Captain holds aloft the sword lock before placing it around his neck

Hilt-and-point sword dances exist in many places in Europe. In this kind of dance, the swords interlock to form a “rose,” or “lock,” that is placed around the neck of a participant to simulate decapitation. As well, crossed-sword dances are common in Europe. Typically, dancers execute complicated patterns of steps over and between the swords. In some variations, clay pipes may replace the swords. Many European sword dances were appropriated by trade guilds, with tools replacing the swords. In Turkey and Greece there exists a butchers’ dance called the hassapikos. It is now a social dance but goes back to a battle mime in the Middle Ages performed with swords and performed by members of by the butchers' guild. Also in Turkey are the so-called “guerrilla dances”, performed by dances arranged in a circle who make swishing and whiffling sounds with their swords (possibly to clear the area of evil spirits), followed by mock combat.

Chain-sword dance is a group dance in which the dancers first use a sword or other implement (stick, stave, etc.) to link themselves in a chain. In the Hungarian tradition, the Erdőbénye cooper dance represents this form of dance.

Moreška, a sword dance on the Croatian island of Korčula in the Adriatic, recalls combat between Christians and Moros (Moors), though in the 19th century the dance changed from Christians vs. Moors to Turks vs. Moors.

Historically, the Hungarian heyduck dance was a soldiers' dance that involved virtuoso whirling of weapons and free-form compositions with battle practice motifs. Such dances also appear in Gypsy, Slovak, Ruthenian, and Transylvanian folklore. In many of these areas, the so-called "stick dancing" of shepherds is a reenactment of combat with real weapons.

In a few isolated sections of Europe, a rather savage male combat dance survives. In the villages of the Transylvania Alps and Carpathian mountains, before Twelfth Night and Whitsunday, nine men from nine villages assemble for the Joc de căluşari or căluş, a rite of initiation. The men engage in fierce battle with sticks, which used to be bloody and sometimes fatal.

==== Basque dances ====
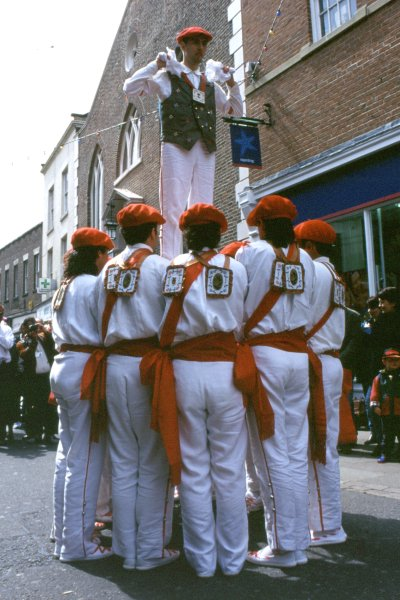
Dancers from Markina-Xemein, Basque Country.

Some of the Basque dances feature weapons. The ezpatadantza ("sword dance") comes from Durango, Spain in the Basque Country and is danced for authorities and in the Feast of Corpus Christi. After the dance, both opposing rows of dancers raise their weapons and form a corridor for the authorities.

The ezpatadantza and the makildantza ("stick dance") employ makila (traditional walking sticks), and end with the dancers raising one of them, lying as a fallen warrior, over their heads.

In the Basque Country the Okrabario Dantza is performed in Legazpi, Gipuzkoa. It is a sword dance in which a participant dances atop a grid of crossed swords held aloft. In Tolosa during the day on Midsummer, the Bordon-Dantza ("makila dance") is performed with the figures of the ezpatadantza; some point its origins to the border fights in the Middle Ages, when the Castilian troops from Gipuzkoa won an important victory over the troops from Navarre at the Battle of Beotibar. Sticks simulate some weapons, and halberds—a combination of a spear and a battle-axe—are also used.

=== Asia ===
Baris is a traditional dance of Bali, in which a solo dancer depicts the feelings of a young warrior prior to battle. Originally, Baris was performed as a religious ritual. The dancer may bear a kris, a spear, a bow, or other weapons, depending on the variant performed. The word "Baris" literally means "line" or "file", and referred to the line of soldiers who served the rajas of Bali. The dance is usually performed by men in a group with as few as four dancers and as many as sixty. The ritualistic function of the dance is to show physical maturity by demonstrating military skills, particularly the use of weapons.

In China, dances with weapon have been recorded for a long time. The founder of the Han dynasty Liu Bang was said to be fond of the war dance of the Ba people. Large-scale performances of the dance involved the brandishing of various weapons to the accompaniment of drums and songs in the Ba language. It remained popular through the Tang dynasty and spread as far as Central Asia. The development of art dance, in general, in China reached its peak during the Tang dynasty and then was largely integrated into Chinese Opera practice. Tribal weapon dancing may also be present among the original aboriginal tribes on Taiwan (The Republic of China). The Shaolin martial arts employ weapons in ways that are sometimes enjoyed for aesthetic reasons, however, similar to a dance. Shaolin spear, Yezhan spear, Lanmen spear, and sword and stick exercises may be included. Tai chi also incorporates sword practise in a similar way.

The Dayak people of Borneo are renowned for their solo sword dances, which show the skill of a young man using a sharp mandau. Also, on the island of Borneo one finds the Lotud, an indigenous ethnic group residing in Sabah. The Lotud are well known for their very colourful costumes and their dances, one of which is the Bakanjar, a war-like dance with a man holding a sword and a shield, originally performed to portray the sword fight and heroic exploits of the headhunting days.

In the Indian subcontinent, the sword dance Choliya or Saraon of the Kumaon region of the hills of the Indian state of Uttarakhand started partly due to their long martial tradition and also to give protection to marriage processions. It was also held auspicious and, according to Hindu tradition, warded off evil spirits. It has a very beautiful and graceful form and has techniques which give it the status of a martial art.

Among the traditional weapon dances of India is the Shad Sukmynsiem, performed in the north-eastern state of Meghalaya. Both Christians and Hindus may take part as long as they belong to Khasi community. Young lads clad in colourful silk dhotis dance around with a sword or spear in one hand and a plume in the other. The move in a protective circle around an inner circle of young maidens. A popular dance in Mizoram in the north-east corner of India is Sawlakin, a word that "means spirit of the slain." Traditionally, the dance was led by the warrior who had hunted a big game or killed a man. He would wear his best clothes and a plume of red feather. He would wield a gun or dao and a shield. He would be followed by other dancers in a row, who would also carry weapons, or cymbals or gongs.

The Pashtuns of Afghanistan practice a wide range of weapon dances, including the Khattak Wal Atanrh (named after the Khattak tribe) and the Mahsood Wal Atanrh (which, in modern times, involves the juggling of loaded rifles). A sub-type of the Khattak Wal Atanrh known as the Braghoni involves the use of up to three swords and requires great skill to successfully execute.

=== Middle East and Asia Minor ===
Party among Alawites involving guns, from the 1879 travelogue of Léon Cahun

There are a number of Arab weapon dances, including the razfah. It was originally practiced at Manga in Muscat, prior to going out on a raid; the object of the dance was to "warm up" for the combat to come. Also, on the Arabian Peninsula a dance named Ardah recalls pre-Islamic tribal battles. Two rows of men face one another, clapping, singing, and dancing in a lively manner, accompanied by large frame drums. At the peak of the dance two swordsmen perform a duel between the rows of dancers.

The Assyrian minority in Syria have a dramatic folk dance called Shora, which commemorates the bloody battles fought by the Ancient Assyrians back in their time consisting of a leader (usually a man) in front with a sword otherwise known as a saypa and a line of men joining.

Generally speaking, a number of dances (known as razfah or yowlah) of Bedouin origin use weapons and have achieved modern popularity in the Arab states of the Persian Gulf and are associated with festive occasions among the non-Bedouin sedentary population.

In Iran there exists the Çûb-Bâzî ("stick game"; or raqs-e çûb, "stick dance"), a dance form that probably has its origins in reenactments of combat. Essentially, an attacker and a defender duel with poles. The çûb-bâzî is “…both a dance and a show of skill and bravery; participants are judged by their abilities in the combat aspects, as well as by their grace in executing the dance movements.”

=== Africa ===
In South Africa, such dances as the Zulu Indlamu, the traditional dance most often associated with Zulu culture, is performed with drums and full traditional attire and is derived from the war dances of the warriors. Also, the military influence of the warrior King Shaka is reflected in demonstrations of stick fighting (umshiza) with which the male teenagers and men settle their personal differences in a public duel.

The Jerusema (or Mbenede) dance of the Zezuru people in Zimbabwe is an interesting kind of hybrid war dance—"hybrid" in the sense that music and dance formed a part of the actual battle-field preparations, themselves, as well as of the ritual dance recalling the battle. (The Zezuru are one of the Shona peoples who were the builders of the great monuments of the Monomotapa kingdom in Zimbabwe between the 10th and 15th centuries.) The dance is a re-creation of a battle strategy developed by the Zezuru in the 19th century against incursions of other tribes in the wake of colonialist expansion of the Boers. The dance, itself, recalls the music and dance used as a diversionary tactic on the battlefield to distract the enemy while Zezuru warriors maneuvered into position; thus, the ritual dance involves the music and dance of the “distractors” as well as warriors with weapons moving into position.

Ethiopia has a long, historical reputation as a place where the weapon dance plays an important cultural role. According to Lucian, a Greek writer from the 2nd century, “The Ethiopians dance also during the battle. The Ethiopian never shoots his arrow without dancing and making a menacing gesture beforehand. He wants to frighten the enemy by his dance beforehand.” The broad range of weapon dances includes the hota jumping dance of Amharic males; the attack dance of the Hailefo; the stick-dance of the Kullo; the Beroronsi Hama Haban, a dramatic dagger dance of the Esa; and the shire, the saber dance of the Tigrean nomadic shepherds.

=== Australia, New Zealand and Polynesia ===
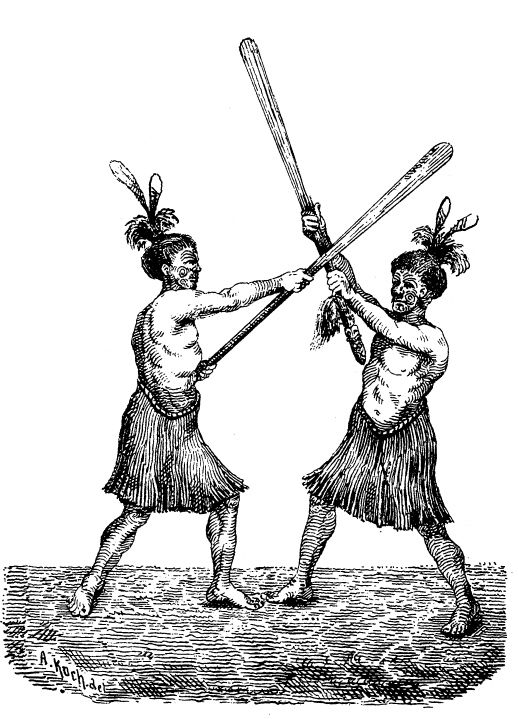
Two Māori men wielding taiaha.

In Australia, there are aboriginal dances that reenact hunting and combat using traditional weapons such as the boomerang. Sometimes two boomerangs are clapped together as a musical instrument to provide sounds for dances.

In New Zealand, Maori have raised the martial art associated with the taiaha and mere to the level of a weapon dance. The haka could also be considered as a weapon dance, as it includes elements of warlike challenge to chanting and musical (sung) accompaniment.

The Nifo oti, or Samoan fire knife dance, is also a kind of weapon dance. The kailao is a standing male war dance of Tonga. The kailao is performed by men (less commonly women also perform it with the men as a mixed dance), who carry clubs or fighting sticks. The performers dance in a fierce manner to emulate combat, all to the accompaniment of a slit drum or a tin box. Additional idiophonic percussion is provided by strung rattles worn on the anklets of the dancers, and the clashing together of the wooden implements of war, which today are either sticks or mock weapons. The dance is unusual for Tonga in that it lacks recited poetry as accompaniment, which fact is taken to mean that it was imported to Tonga from elsewhere.

=== North and Central America ===
So-called “war dances” of indigenous North American tribes may also be classified as weapon dances. Recent interest in preserving Native American traditions has led to such groups as The Warriors of AniKituhwa, a Cherokee dance group who recreate Cherokee dances, including the war dance, do research and offer dance workshops for their community. A dance such as the Comanche Sun Dance of the 1870s was an invocation of invulnerability to the White Man's bullets; the dance was a preliminary ritual to battle and would be a war dance and, hence, a weapon dance. In Bermuda, an insular North Atlantic colony included within British North America, indigenous North American war dance and costume were combined with elements drawn from Afro-Caribbean and British military culture by Gombey dance troupes, armed with tomahawks and bows.

Also, the moresca (or morisca) (above) exists in some areas in the Americas that used to be Spanish colonies—Mexico, for example. In the Jamiltepec region of Mexico, there exists perhaps the most colorful version of that kind of dance, the Chareos dance. It represents a battle between Moors, led by Pilate, and Christians, led by James, the apostle. Sixteen male dancers take part and the dancer who plays the part of James appears as a horse rider and wears a costume that incorporates a white horse. The dancers wear ostrich feathers on their heads, a peacock feather at the front, white cotton square over their shoulders, velvet trousers decorated with gold brocade over white cotton pants and carry a machete. In addition, the leader has a hat with a small mirror and a white feather headdress. Two men at the front carry two red flags and two white flags, red symbolizing the blood spilt by James' soldiers and white symbolizing the peace that reigned after the Christian victory. The sounds of drums and flutes accompany the dance. These dances that pit Christian against Moor are almost certainly Christianized versions of earlier, pre-Cortez dances that ritualized the battle between the tiger and the eagle.

Similar to the Moor-Christian confrontation of the morisca—whether in Spain or in transplanted versions in Central America—there are also elaborate ritual dances in Mexico such as the Danza de la Pluma that exploit the trauma of the Spanish conquest of indigenous America. Weapons employed may be swords (and shields) whips, even firearms. These representations take place over a large area of Mesoamerica and, in part, are an obvious adaptation of Spanish tradition, but in Mexico will pit the native Aztec against the Spanish invader. The most interesting aspect of these dances is that—depending on where one sees them and under what conditions—it is plausible to read into the dances an outcome other than the historical Spanish victory. That is, indigenous performers may take inspiration from the fact that the natives of Spain drove out the Moorish invaders; thus, the natives of Mesoamerica, too, shall one day drive out the invaders.

Some dances that abound at Carnival and Corpus Christi fiestas go back to pre-Conquest ritual combat dances of the Aztecs. For example, during the 15th month of the Aztec calendar, Huitzilopochtli, god of the sun and war was honored by real duels between slave victims and mimed battles among masked boy votaries. Also, among the Náhuatl-speaking people in the Pacific Ocean region of Michoacán, there is the cuauileros dance (the cudgelers' dance). The performance of this dance represents a battle between Aztecs and Spaniards, and dancers perform with rattles made of thin metal plates and wooden cudgels.

=== South America ===
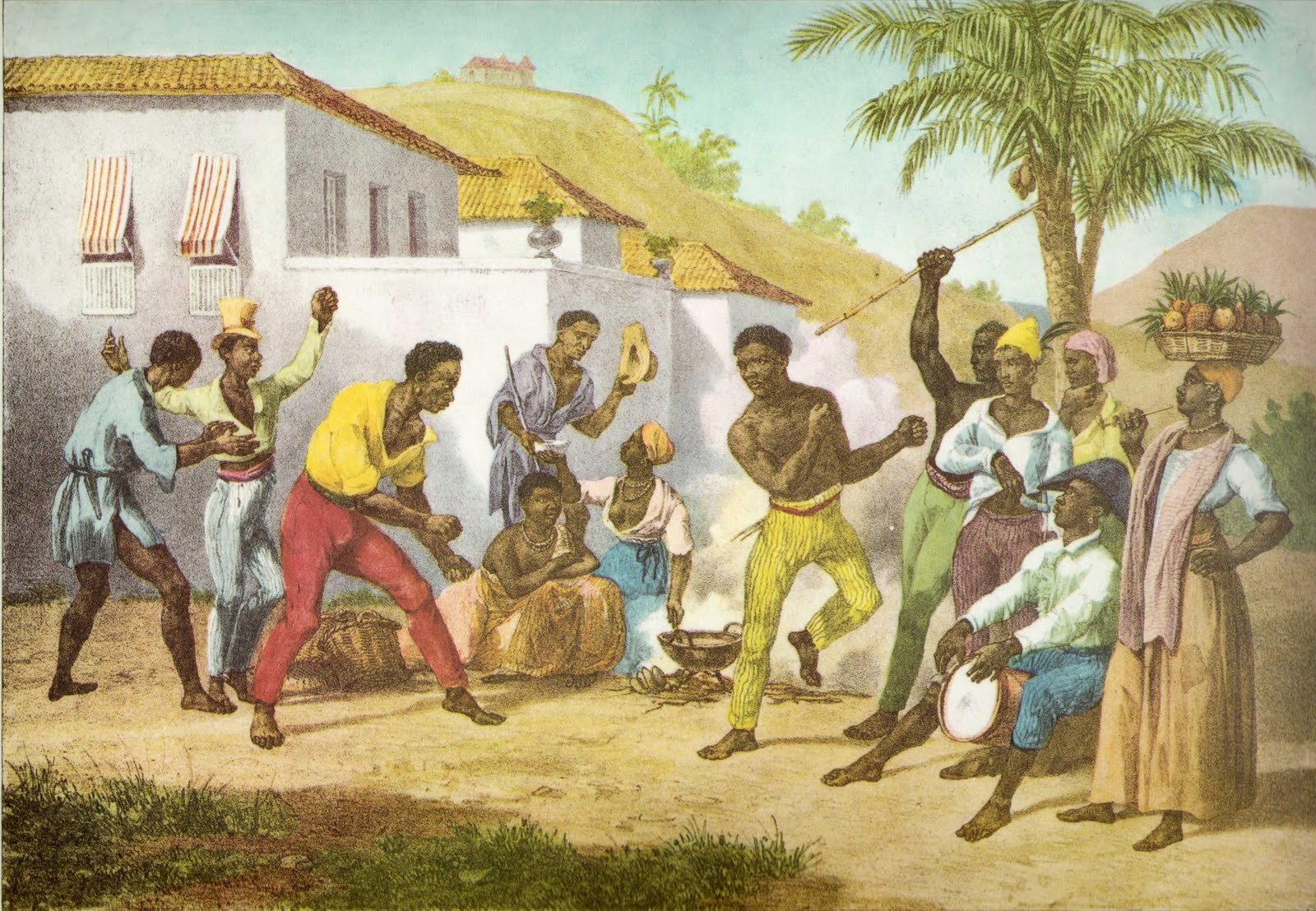
Capoeira or the Dance of War by Johann Moritz Rugendas, 1825, published 1835

The landscape of all dance in a large country such as Brazil is rich and complex due to the mixing of three separate traditions—Indian native, Black African, and Portuguese. In Brazil, the African influence on Brazilian folkdances is considerable. For example, capoeira—a dance-like fighting style—and the maculelê fighting dance are strongly reminiscent of African dances. Capoeira is of particular interest. In the 19th century, Capoeira was played mostly by African slaves who had been brought from West Central Africa, making them the original capoeiristas and making the art a complex form of social interaction, expressing the participants' physical skills and spiritual essence, involving the gods and the spirits of the ancestral fathers. The participants played during festivals and holidays, jumping and leaping in front of musical bands, military troops, and religious processions. This dance “game” was considered dangerous to public order and was eventually criminalized in the late 19th century. Today, capoeira has staged somewhat of a comeback and is even studied in dance academies as part of a general movement to rejuvenate folk traditions. Capoeira may be played unarmed or with blades held in the hands or feet.

The sticks used as mock weapons in some of these dances also serve as percussion instruments. In the southern state of Rio Grande do Sul, the machete, a tool used to cut jungle brush, is used in a dance called dança dos facões (dance of the machetes). In this dance (historically performed only by men, although this trend changes as the dance spreads), the dancers knock their machetes while dancing, simulating a battle. Machete are sometimes used in place of sticks in maculelê.

== Weapon dance as art ==
Since dance is already an art form, “weapon dance as art” may seem redundant; yet, “art” is used here to mean the re-creation, say, of a folk weapon dance in a more professional staged venue, such as a ballet, or when an Australian, Native American, or African troupe of professional musicians and dancers present a reenactment on stage of a weapon dance, or when the use of weapons is introduced in stylized dance enactments of fighting. For example, recent ballets such as the New York City Ballet's version of Romeo and Juliet (to the music of Sergei Prokofiev) employ highly choreographed sword-fight/dance sequences.

Additionally, there is overlap between weapon dance and stylized forms of stage combat, i.e., choreographed enactments of “real fights,” from bar-room brawls to sword-fighting to large-scale battle scenes. Stage combat uses the services of professionals called “fight directors,” “weapon choreographers,” etc. An early example of this kind of staged combat in Europe was in Italy in the late 19th century, where the term tramagnini came to be used generically in the sense of “extra” or “stunt man” for those who fought on the stage in enactments of battle scenes in grand opera, for example. Tramagnini was originally a family name in Florence and referred to members of the family who started a gymnastics club and soon wound up appearing on stage in enactments of fighting, both bare-handed and with weapons.

Elsewhere, the kabuki theater tradition in Japan employs ritualized representations of violence on the stage. While kabuki is technically theater and not dance, the movements, for example, of the sword-fighting termed tachimawari in kabuki are gymnastic to the point even of employing somersaults, and elaborate fight scenes are so deliberate and stylized that they provide at least an area of overlap between theater and dance.

Also, the Communist revolution in China produced the view that art—including dance—must support the “armed struggle of the proletariat.” By the 1970s, weapons commonly appeared in such works as "Red Detachment of Women,’’ a ballet about a women’s revolutionary armed force in the 1930s in China.

Interesting, perhaps, in the use of weapons in these recent “revolutionary” works is that they are, generally speaking, not reenactments of traditional folk dances. The introduction of weaponry into Chinese ballet—regardless of the revolutionary message—was, itself, a revolution.

== See also ==
- Geommu
- Long Sword dance
- Stick dance (African-American)
- Exhibition drill
- Tahtib
- Border Morris
