= Basque dance =

Documentary on basque traditional dances and renovation made by argia.com

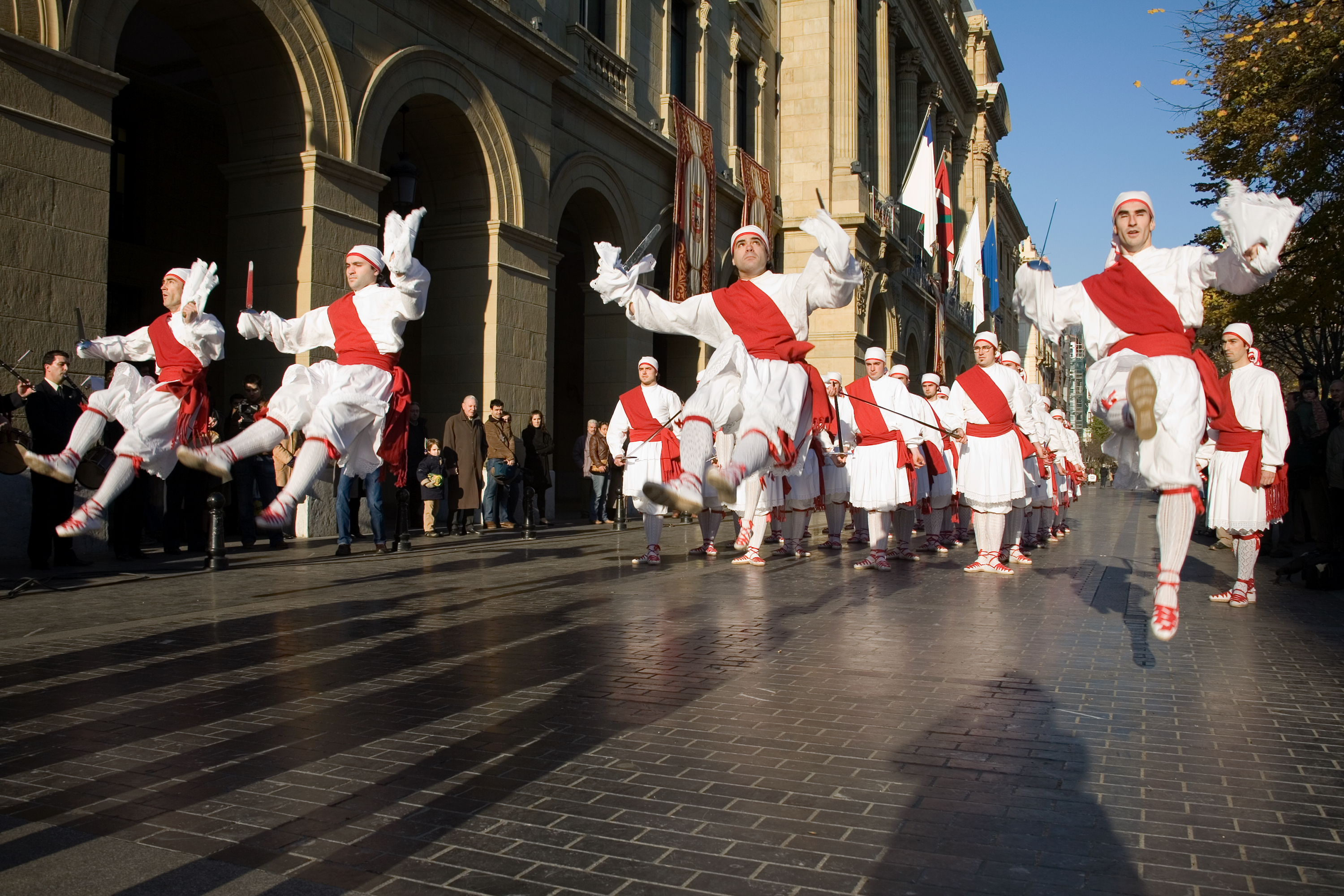
Dancers in San Sebastián

Basque dance is the folk dance by the Basque people of the Basque Country.

== History ==
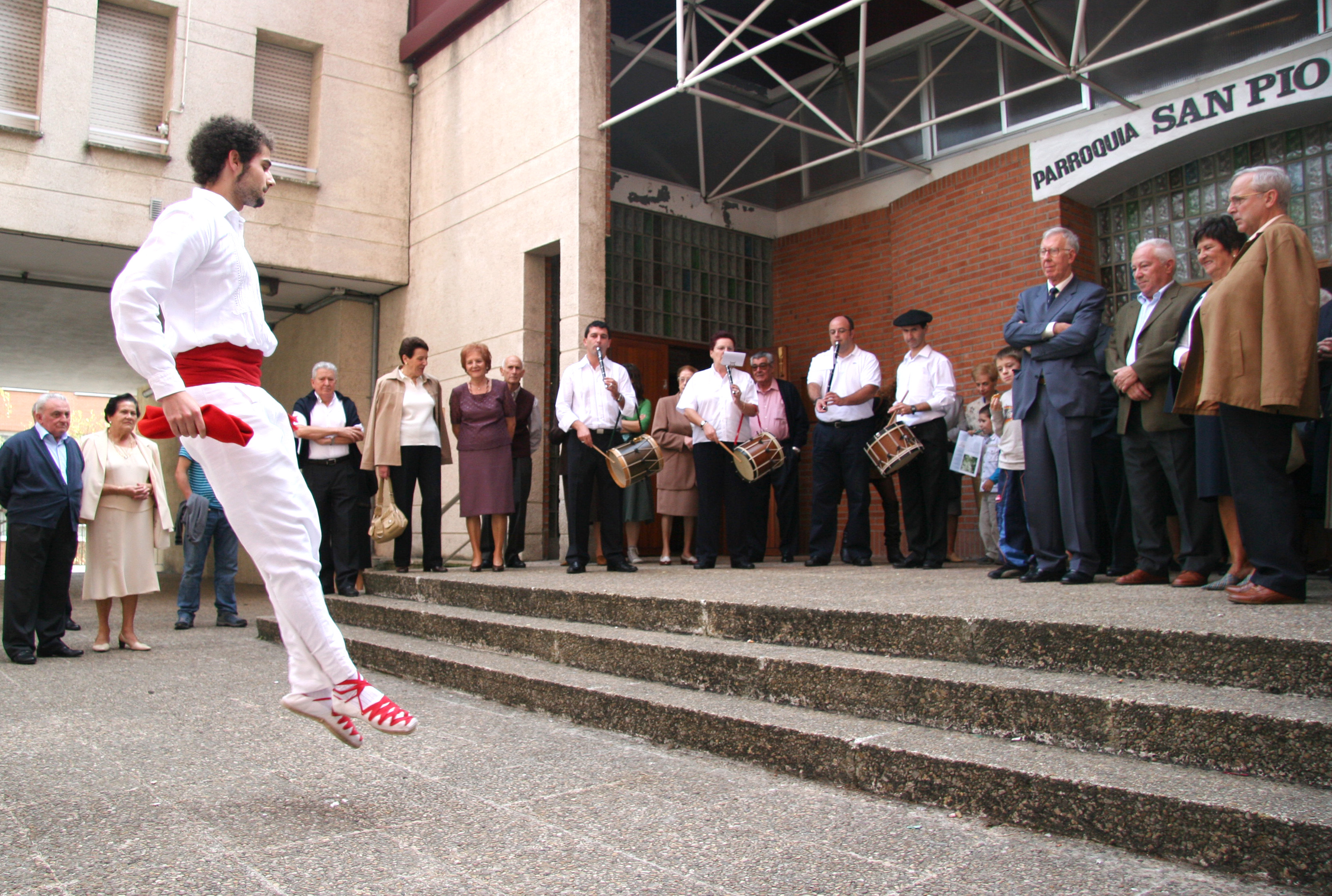
A Basque dancer

From one part of the Basque country to another the music, steps and costumes change, but the collective reveals the Basques' deep love of dance. There are approximately 400 distinct Basque folk dances, each with its own story and significance.

Some, the more ancient ritual dances, are performed only for particular events or circumstances and initially were performed by male dancers only. Many include the use of sticks and swords that the dancers strike together as they progress through the movements of the dance. The more recent social dances derive from early celebratory dances but are today devoid of any sacred function. They are characterized by differences in style and function, and allow for dual-gender participation. Some are more complex, while others are simpler. Some are ritual while others are entertaining. Some sacred and other profane. Some are open group dances and others closed.

Generally the space in which they are carried out is open, although a few were originally danced in closed quarters. The vast majority are danced only by men, some only by women and others by both sexes. The basic characteristics of Basque dance are seen in the choreography, historical and festive elements, and the universal traits of tradition, entertainment, tourism and especially religious-festive events. You can tell a good dancer by how high they jump, their double clicks, how high they kick, and their gracefulness.

== Early observations ==
Voltaire noted in his observations

"The basque, this people who sings and dances on his mountains"

Strabo's observation in the first century B.C.

"(Basques) danced after drinking, alone or in groups, competing...as to who should leap the highest and fall on his knees with the most grace"

== Types of dance ==
Dantzari Dantza from Durangaldea (Biscay) is a well known cycle of dances where on the eve of the local feast day, it is the custom to set up the traditional San Juan or Donianeatxa oak tree (now usually a poplar). The trunk is peeled and the branches limbed, and flowers and a sometime a flag or two are placed at the top. All of the festive activities take place around this symbol, which is set up in the middle of the town square. The nine dances that make up the cycle have remained unchanged since at least the 19th century; the choreography consists of two parallel rows of dancers standing face to face. The dancers, in a show of virility, very skillfully manoeuvre fighting weapons as part of the dance.

Sorgin Dantza from Oria (Gipuzkoa) is a comical or a burlesque dance that reach their peak in the Sorgin Dantza, or dance of the witches. These dances, a combination of wild and sometimes a bit obscene body movements, have managed to remain alive over time in certain towns. The best known of these dances can be seen in the town of Lasarte-Oria. As the story goes, this dance simulates a group of workers who moved here from the town of Bergara. Today this dance is also danced in the town of Antzuola during Carnival, although here, along with the dantzaris and musicians, there are also people dressed up as bears and monkeys.

Mutxikoak is a popular dance of Basque Ancestors, which comes back stronger these days, as if the tradition could never be forgotten. Mutxikoak which in Basque means that at first "a young boy's dance", although women dance it more now than young boys. It is danced in circle as around a sun, where the individuality of each other fuse together with the universality of an illimited circle, where each person is unique even if everybody dances the same dance.

=== Weapon dances ===
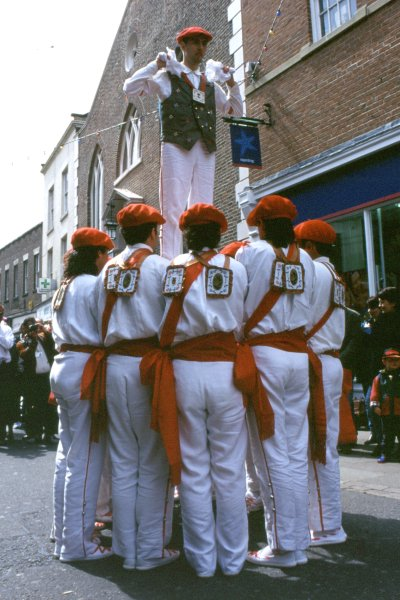
Dancers from Markina, Basque Country.

Some of the Basque dances feature weapons. The ezpatadantza ("sword dance") comes from the Durango area and is danced for authorities and in the feast of Corpus Christi. After the dance, both opposing rows of dancers raise their weapons and form a corridor for the authorities. The ezpatadantza and the makildantza ("stick dance") ends with the dancers raising one of them, lying as a fallen warrior, over their heads.

In the Basque province of Gipuzkoa in Spain, the Okrabario Dantza is performed in Legazpi—a sword dance in which a participant dances atop a grid of crossed swords held aloft. In Tolosa, on Midsummer Day, the Bordon-Dantza ("walking stick dance") is performed with the figures of the ezpatadantza; some point its origins to the border fights in the Middle Ages, when the Castilian troops from Gipuzkoa won an important victory over the troops from Navarre at the Battle of Beotibar. Sticks simulate some weapons, and halberds—a combination of a spear and a battle-axe—are also used.

== See also ==
- Koruko Ama Birjinaren Eskola
