= Rugova =

Rugova or Rugovo may refer to:

- Rugova Canyon, a canyon in Kosovo
- Rugova (region), an ethnographic region near Peja in Kosovo
- Rugova (sword dance), a traditional sword dance of the above region
- Ibrahim Rugova (1944–2006), Kosovo Albanian politician
