= Koruko Ama Birjinaren Eskola =

The Koruko Ama Birjinaren Scholla Cantorum, which adopted its current name, Koruko Ama Birjinaren Eskola, in 1976 and nowadays commonly known as Eskola, is a cultural and arts association founded in 1940 in San Sebastián by Juan Urteaga. Initially, it had a choir, but a dance company emerged soon. In the 1960s, the music band was created, performing together with the dance company ever since. All three groups are active as of today. The first performance of the association was held in Easter 1940: the founding date of Eskola is set to be April 10, 1940.

Eskola is a member of the Union of Basque Dancers, appointed under the division of the Gipuzkoan Union of Basque Dancers.

== Choreographies ==
- Aingerutxo
- Amaia Opera
  - Music: Ezpata-dantza of the Amaia opera (Jesus Guridi)
- Ametsak
  - Choreography: Josetxo Fuentes
  - Music: traditional
  - Choreography based on the activities of the 18th century trading company Royal Gipuzkoan Company of Caracas (2 acts).
- Arin-arina
- Balea
  - Music: Balearen bertsoak (Benito Lertxundi)
- El caserío
  - Choreography: Josetxo Fuentes
  - Music: El caserío: preludio acto II (Jesús Guridi)
  - Choreography composed for the prologue of the 2nd act of the zarzuela El Caserío.
- Donostiako Martxa
  - Choreography: Josetxo Fuentes
  - Music: Raimundo Sarriegui
- Donostiako Martxa Zaharra
  - Choreography: Josetxo Fuentes
  - Music: Jose Juan Santesteban
  - Official zortziko march existing in Donostia in the 19th century.
- Erriberako jota
  - Music: Jota Navarra (Enrique Zelaia)
- Erromeria
  - Music: traditional/Sergio Garzes
- Euskal Musikaren Gorespena
  - Music: Euskal Musikaren Gorespena (José Uruñuela)
- Eusko Irudiak
  - Music: Euzko irudiak: ezpata-dantza (Jesus Guridi)
- Fandangoa
  - Choreography: Josetxo Fuentes
  - Music: traditional
  - Based on the couple dancing (suelto) championship held every year in Segura (Gipuzkoa).
- Gernika
  - Choreography: Josetxo Fuentes
  - Music: Pablo Sorozabal
  - Based on the Bombing of Guernica on April 26, 1937.
- Herribehera
  - Choreography: Josetxo Fuentes
  - Music: Herribehera (Benito Lertxundi)
  - Traditional dance composed of two parts; in the first one, the dancers represent the beds of the Coat of arms of Navarre; in the second part, the dancers represent the Coat of arms of Navarre.
- Hirugarren Hegoa
  - Music: Txoria txori (writer: Joxean Artze; music: Mikel Laboa)
- Hotsean
  - Choreography: Josetxo Fuentes and Juan Luis Unzurrunzaga
  - Music: Baga Biga Higa (Mikel Laboa)
- Ipuina
  - Music: Euskal pizkundea (Benito Lertxundi)
- Maite
  - Choreography: Josetxo Fuentes
  - Music: Pablo Sorozabal
  - Represents the rivalry between two groups of female dancers, each showing their ability to perform.
- Oleskari Zaharra
  - Choreography: Josetxo Fuentes
  - Music: Jose de Olaizola
  - Composed for the Oleskari Zarra opera.
- Salazar
  - Choreography: Josetxo Fuentes
  - Based on the traditional dances from the Salazar Valley in Navarre.
- Sorgiñak
- Txanton Piperri
- Urketariak
  - Choreography: Josetxo Fuentes
  - Music: Sergio Garzes
  - Composed in the tribute of the men, and especially women, who used to go the fountains lying next to the cannons of the Old Town in San Sebastián to look for warter.
- Zortzikoa

== Festivals ==
The Eskola dance company, together with other companies in Donostia, organizes the Lauarin dance festival in the city at the end of June every year.

== The Gardeners' Comparsa ==
The Gardeners' Comparsa is the oldest group of the Carnival in San Sebastian, paraded through the streets for the first time on January 29, 1818. After not being represented by any local group for many years, Eskola regained it in 1999. Since then, Eskola is responsible for representing the Gardeners' Comparsa during Carnival in San Sebastian, as well as other acts of special character.

== Tanborrada ==
Koruko Ama Birjinaren Eskola has a company parading in the Tamborrada since 2012. Both current and former dancers and choristers take part in the company; the total number of members is as high as 145,100 barrels and 45 drums. During the San Sebastian day (January 20), the company parades between 5 p.m. and 9 p.m. along the following streets: Aldapeta – Easo – Zubieta – Marina – San Martin – Urbieta – Larramendi – Errege Katolikoak – Koldo Mitxelena – Urdaneta – Hondarribia – San Martin – Getaria – Arrasate – Hondarribia – Askatasunaren Etorbidea – Urbieta – San Bartolome – Aldapeta. The company stops at several places during the parade to perform Raimundo Sarriegi's San Sebastian martxa.

== See also ==
- Basque dance
- Tamborrada
