= Beotibar =

Coordinates: 43.143188°N 2.042432°W

Beotibar is a locality near Tolosa in the Gipuzkoa province of northern Spain, in the northeastern part of the autonomous community of the Basque Country. That province is bordered by the provinces of Biscay and Álava, the Autonomous Community of Navarre, the French department of Pyrénées-Atlantiques, and the Bay of Biscay.

Beotibar is renowned in Basque history as the site of the battle on 19 September 1321 in which Guipuzcoans defeated the Navarrese. Essentially, the battle was the result of the very complicated geopolitical forces at work in the Middle Ages that went into shaping what one day would become Spain.

In 1016 boundaries had been drawn between Navarre and Castile; these boundaries made what would now be the Basque Country part of Navarre. This lasted until Guipuzcoa, Alava, and Vizcaya broke away from that kingdom amid a difficult political situation and became integrated into Castile under a treaty in 1200. The battle of Beotibar was fought to defeat attempts by the Navarrese to take back Guipuzcoa and reincorporate it. Part of the lore connected with the battle is the courage shown by the Loyola brothers, ancestors of Ignatius of Loyola, founder of the Society of Jesus, known as the Jesuits.

There exists a description of the battle of Beotibar by Juan Zaldibia in his book Suma de las cosas cantábricas y guipuzcoana as well as an old Basque song that recalls the victory.
