= Sword dance =

Type of dance

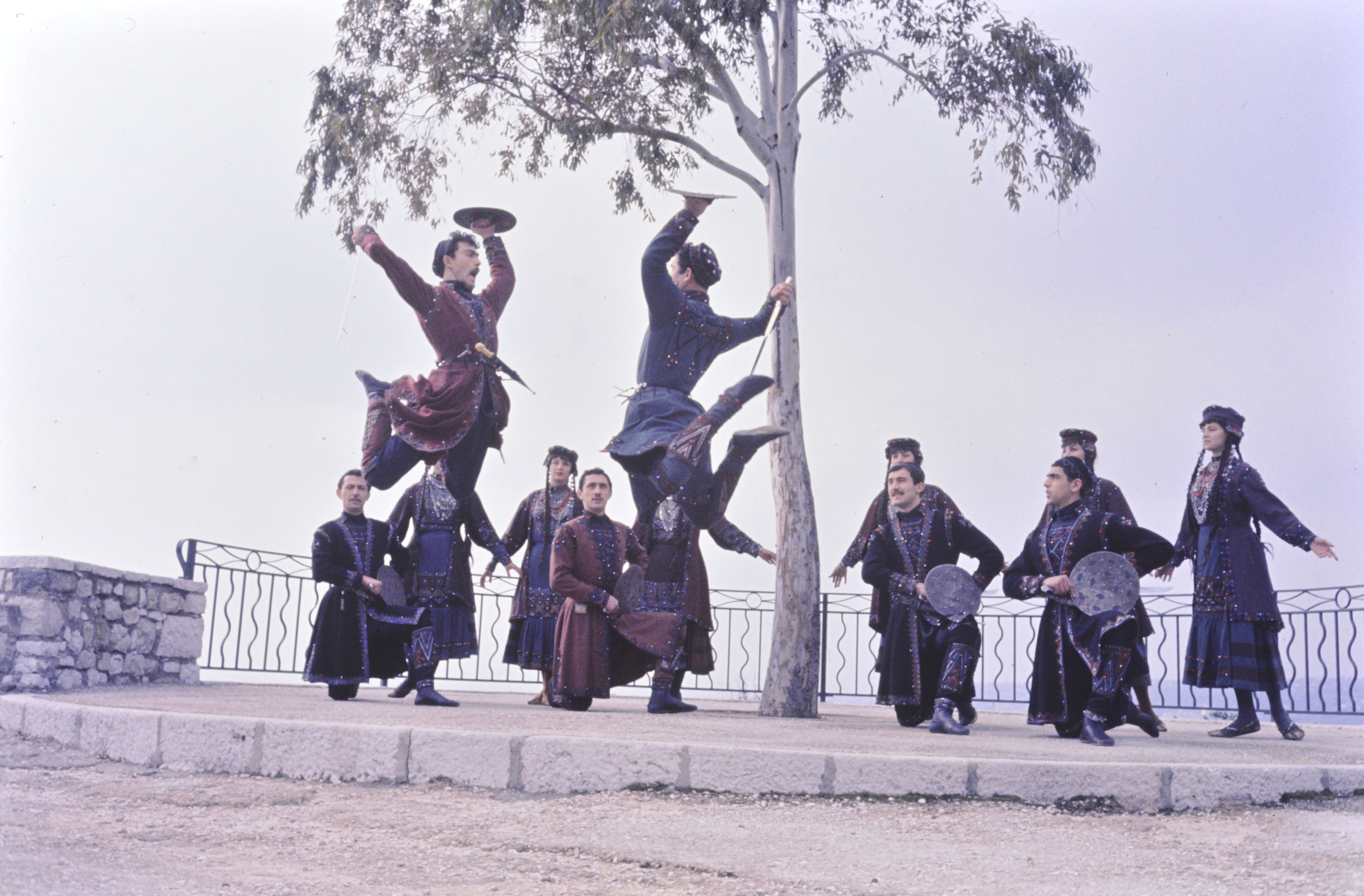
Georgian mock-battle ensemble with short swords and bucklers, Paris 1965

The Sword Dance by Paja Jovanović

Weapon dances incorporating swords or similar weapons are recorded throughout world history. There are various traditions of solo and mock-battle sword dances in Africa, Asia and Europe. Some traditions use sticks or clubs in place of bladed weapons, while most modern performers employ dulled replications to avoid injury.

== Forms ==
General types of sword dance include:

- solo dancers around swords – such as the traditional Scottish sword dances. This general form also encompasses non-sword dances such as the bacca pipes jig in Cotswold morris dance.
- mock-battle dances, including many stick dances from non-sword traditions, and such common continental dances as Bouffons or Mattachins as described by Thoinot Arbeau in 1588.
- hilt-and-point sword dances – where the dancers are linked together by their swords in a chain. These form the basis for rapper sword and long sword forms.

== China and Vietnam ==
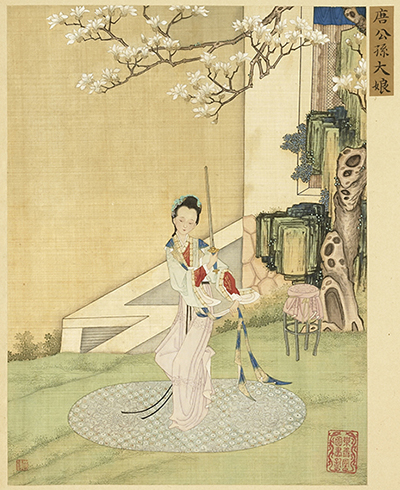
Lady Gongsun of the Tang dynasty, who was known for her elegant sword dancing, as depicted in Gathering Gems of Beauty (畫麗珠萃秀)

Sword dances in China and Vietnam, known as jian wu or múa kiếm, began as a military training exercise with swords and spears which evolved into an elaborate acrobatic dance. Jian wu was one of four classical dances that were used in the Chinese and Vietnamese opera. Each of these dances was very meaningful within the opera performances and they often were used for plot descriptions and characterization. Sword dancing also found a use in Chinese and Vietnamese cultures through communicating with the supernatural; sword dancing was done in an effort to communicate feelings to the dead spirits that may be disrupting a household.

There are quite a few styles within the actual art of sword dancing. The first style focuses on relaxation and flexibility while the other style focuses on speed and strength. There are also different types of swords and weapons used during each dance. A long sword is usually wielded with slower dramatic movements during a solo performance while shorter scimitars are used at a very high pace during a sword dance between two or more people. Each style requires certain movements that require the dancer to be highly agile and athletic.

== Indian subcontinent ==
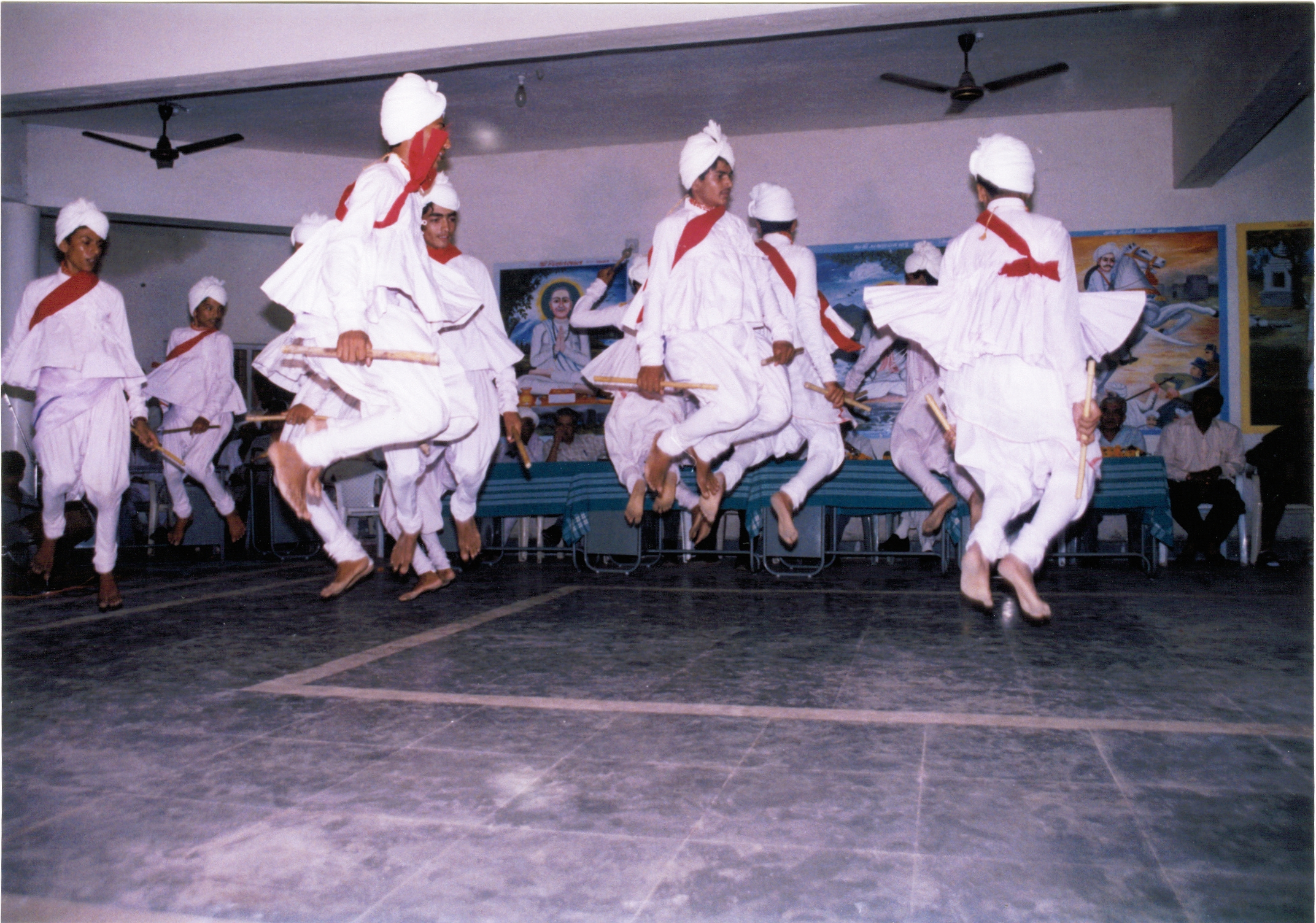
Mer Dandiya, a sword dance performed by the communities of Saurashtra, 2008

Many sword-dances in the Indian subcontinent originated with the martial traditions of the region, the paragon of which exemplified in the long-established Gatka tradition, arising from the tenet of monolithic, theosophical militarization found within Sikhism. The paika akhada which were previously used to train Orissan warriors now perform weapon dances in the streets during festivals. Other dances like the mer dandiya are simply theatrical depictions of battle, while some like the Choliya sword dance of the Kumaon region and Nepal are performed at weddings and special occasions to ward off evil spirits.

In the Indian subcontinent, sword dances include the Chhau sword dance, Firkal the sword dance from Odisha and Jharkhand, the Ka Shad Mastieh sword dance from Meghalaya, and the Bhotiya tribe sword dance from Uttarakhand. The Dhal-Talwar Raas is the sword dance from the martial traditions of Gujarat's Kshatriya and Rajput communities, and is usually performed on the occasion of Navratri. Velakali and Parichamuttukali are traditional sword dances from the state of Kerala derived from the martial art of Kalaripayattu.

Lakharu-li sword dance, Khaijama-Phanai sword dance, and the Khattak sword dance are performed on festive occasions.

== Middle East ==
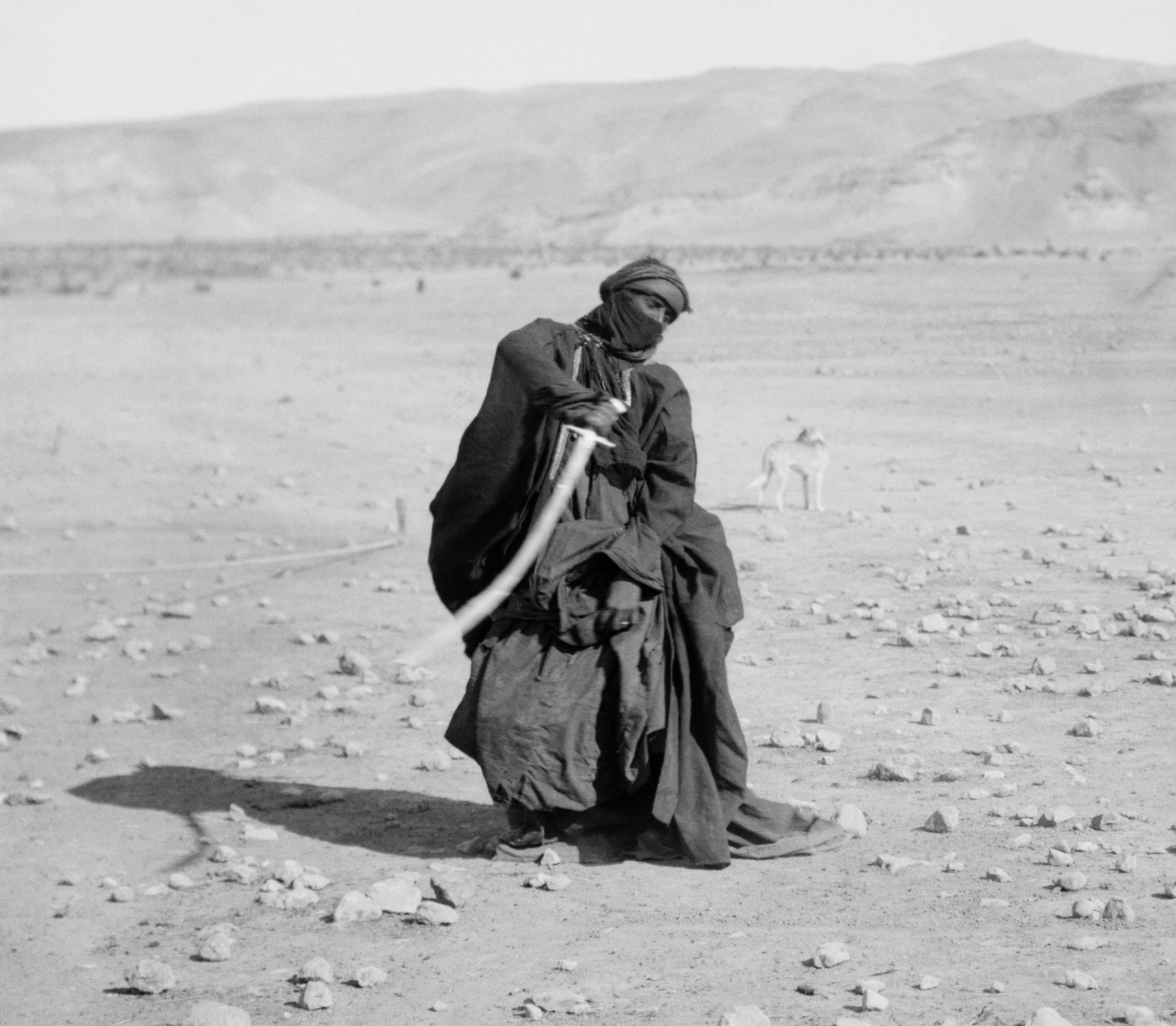
A Bedouin woman performing a sword dance, c. 1910

Arab sword dances (raqs al-saïf) evolved out of sword fighting between men, in both Egypt and Turkey. There was even a time when sword dancing was banned by the sultan during Ottoman rule, as it was believed that dancers, who took swords from soldiers and pretended to "kill" them at the end of the performances, collected the swords to begin a resistance against the army. These swords were never returned. Female sword dancing was not widespread in West Asia. Men in Egypt performed a dance called el ard, a martial dance involving upraised swords, but women were not widely known to use swords as props during their dancing in public. However, paintings and engravings by French artist Jean-Léon Gérôme (who visited Egypt in the 18th century) show sword dancers balancing sabers on their heads. The Turkish Kılıç Kalkan dance of Bursa is performed exclusively by men with a sword and shield, and represents the Ottoman conquest of the city. The performers wear early Ottoman battle dress and dance to the sound of clashing swords and shields without music.

== Europe ==
Hilt-and-point sword dances are, or were, performed all over Europe. These are particularly concentrated in an area corresponding to the boundaries of the Holy Roman Empire at around 1400–1500, and many of these traditional dances are still performed in England, Czech Republic, Germany, Austria, North Italy, France, Flanders, and the Iberian Peninsula, with a particular concentration in Basque Country, Galicia and Andalusia. Sword dances are also performed by Albanians, both in the Balkans and in Italy. Into the late 1400s Albanian sword dances were imitated by Italian tarantellas.

Sword dances performed by the guilds of Smiths and Cutlers in Nuremberg are recorded from 1350. 16th century records of sword dances survive from all over Germany. Depictions of dances survive from Zürich (1578) and Nuremberg (1600). In Scotland a dance was recorded as being performed in 1285, but this was found in a document from 1440.

An important concentration of traditional sword dances can be found on the Italian side of the western Alps. Main sites are Giaglione, Venaus and S. Giorio in the Susa valley, where the so-called "Spadonari" (sword-holders) dance is still performed between the end of January and the beginning of February. This dance is also connected with the rebirth of nature and vegetation.

In Romania, in a dance called Căluș, a sword dance similar to a Morris Dance, is part of a more complex ritualistic dance involving elements of fertility ritual and horse worship.

Hilt-and-point sword dances traditional to England include rapper sword and long sword, although both of these are now also performed by revival teams outside their traditional areas, including teams in most of the English-speaking world. Rattle Up My Boys (RUMB) is a UK print journal for those with an interest in sword dance. Established in 1987 by founding editor Trevor Stone, it covers news, interviews, features, and reviews on Longsword, rapper sword and other forms of European and world sword dance. The journal has clocked up over 130 editions. It is published quarterly in the UK and is available via subscription. In 1980 Trevor Stone wrote and self-published a book on the origins of traditional Yorkshire longsword dancing, also called "Rattle Up, My Boys".

English sword dancing has also been brought to the New World, initially as part of the "morris revival" of the 1970s and 1980s. Teams are now extant in most major metropolitan areas in North America. The New York City Sword Ale is an annual gathering over Presidents' Day weekend that brings together over a dozen sword teams form the east coast and around the world.

The Rugova war dance (Albanian: Vallja me shpata e Rugovës or Loja Luftarake e Rugovës) is a traditional Albanian war dance named after the Rugova region in Kosovo. The dance is considered a relic of the war dances (Albanian: valle luftarake), the remnants of pantomimic dances performed in the re-enactment or preparation of battles. The dance is performed by two male dancers who fight a mock battle for the hand of a girl (a "maiden's dance").

== Gallery ==
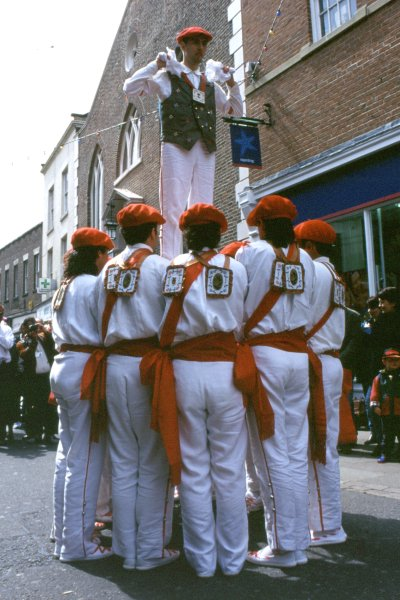
Markina sword dancers (Basque Country)

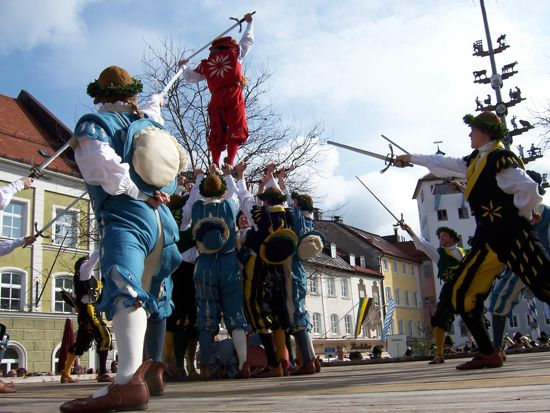
Traunstein Sword Dance (Germany, Bavaria)

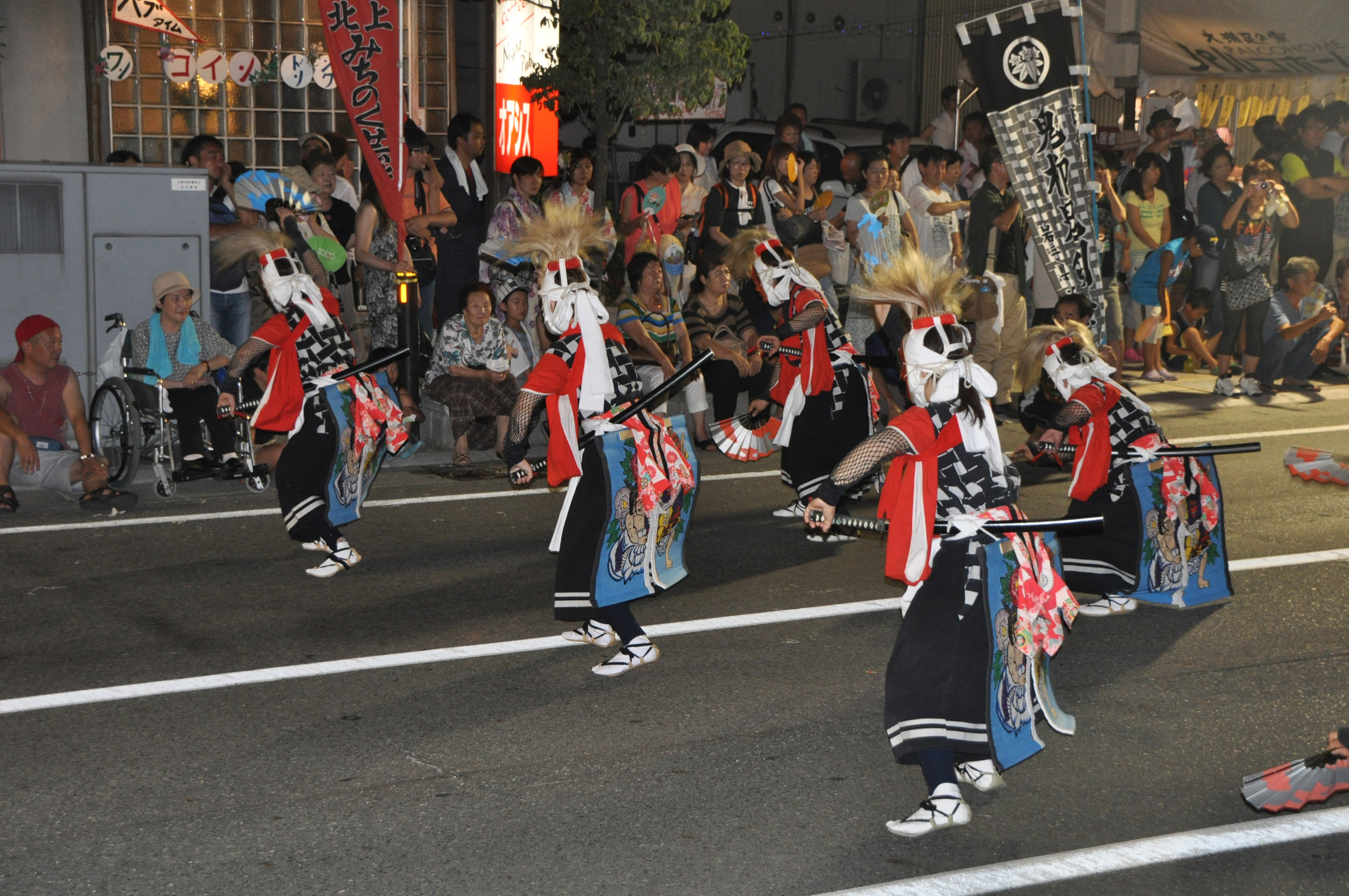
Oni Kenbai (Devils Sword Dance) of Kitakami, Iwate, Japan

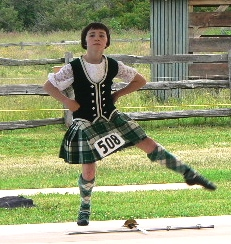
A young Highland dancer demonstrates a Scottish sword dance at the 2005 Bellingham (Washington) Highland Games

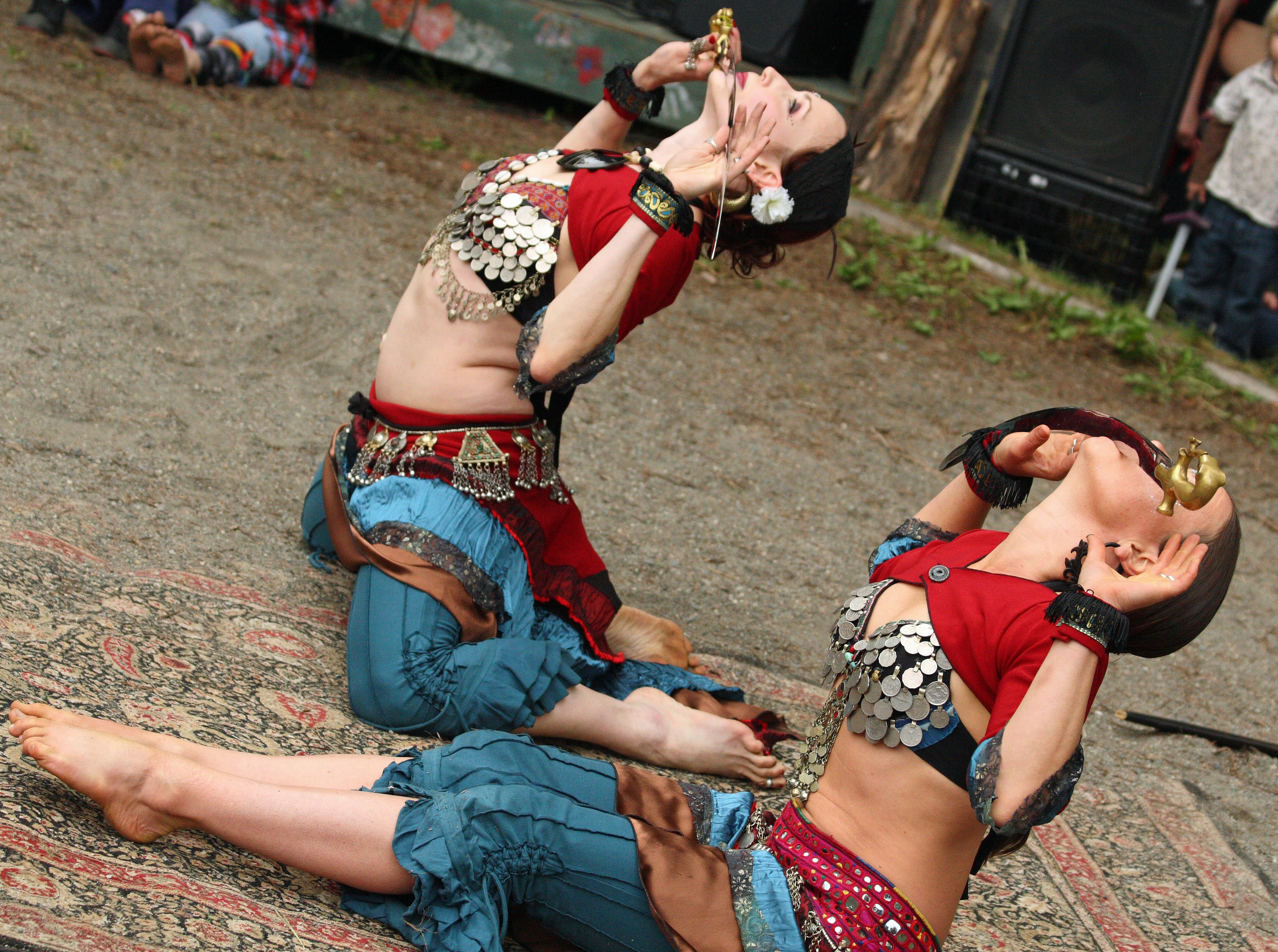
A Gipsy Underground performance near Anchorage, Alaska, 2010

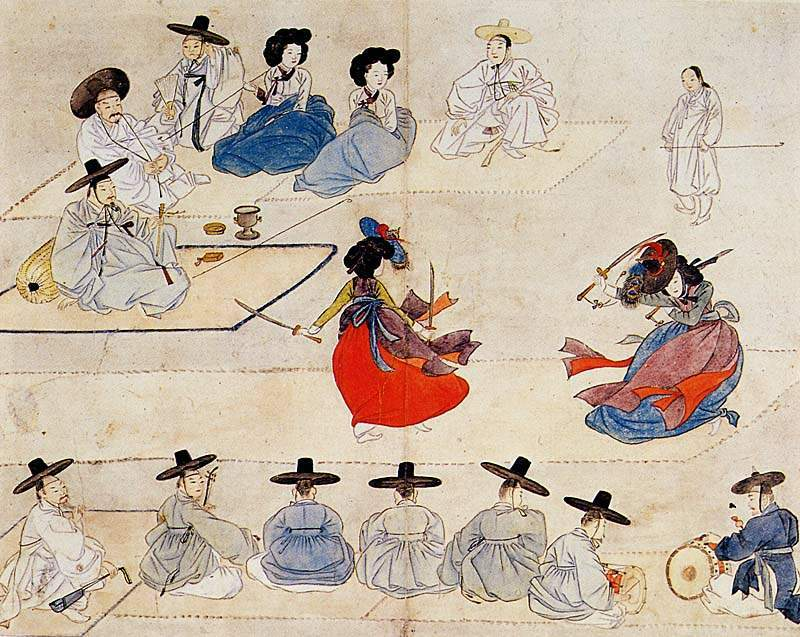
Dancing together holding with two swords, depicting two Kisaeng performing together in Korea sometime after 1805. From Hyewon pungsokdo, held by the Gansong Art Museum in Seoul.

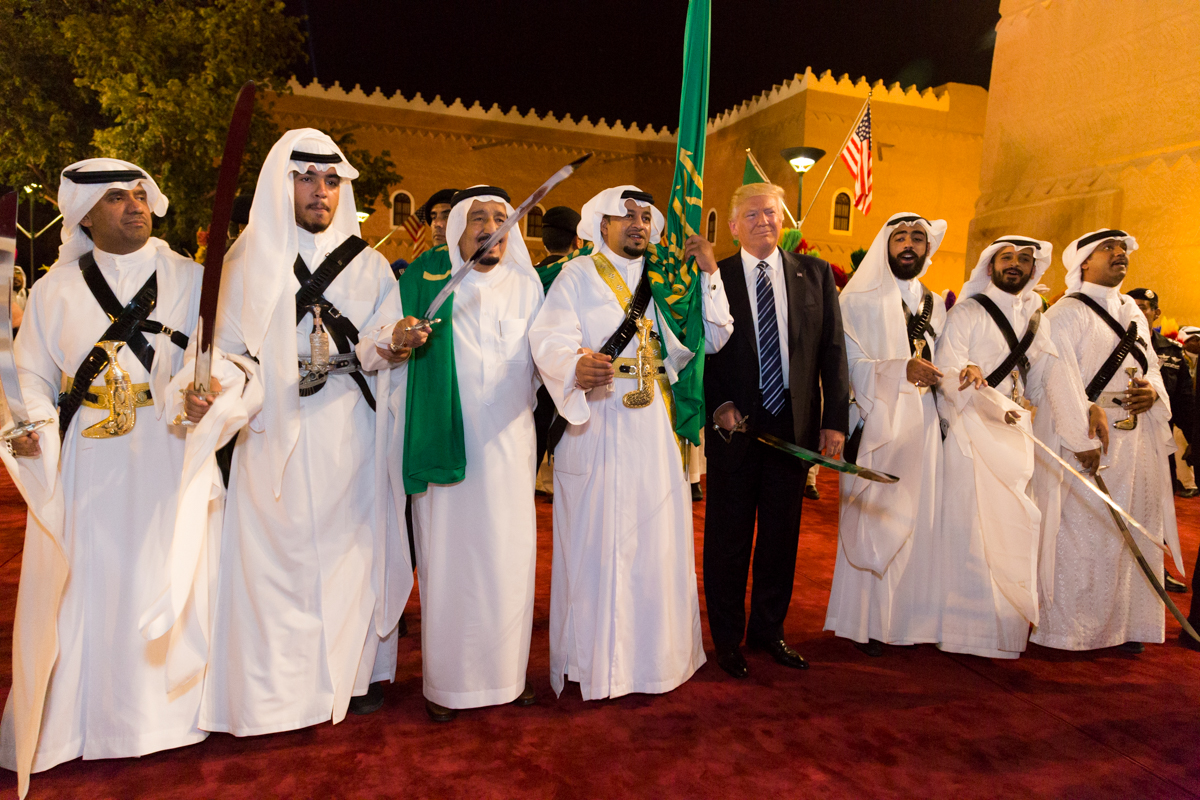
King Salman of Saudi Arabia and U.S. President Donald Trump dance the Najdi ardah at the Murabba Palace in Riyadh.

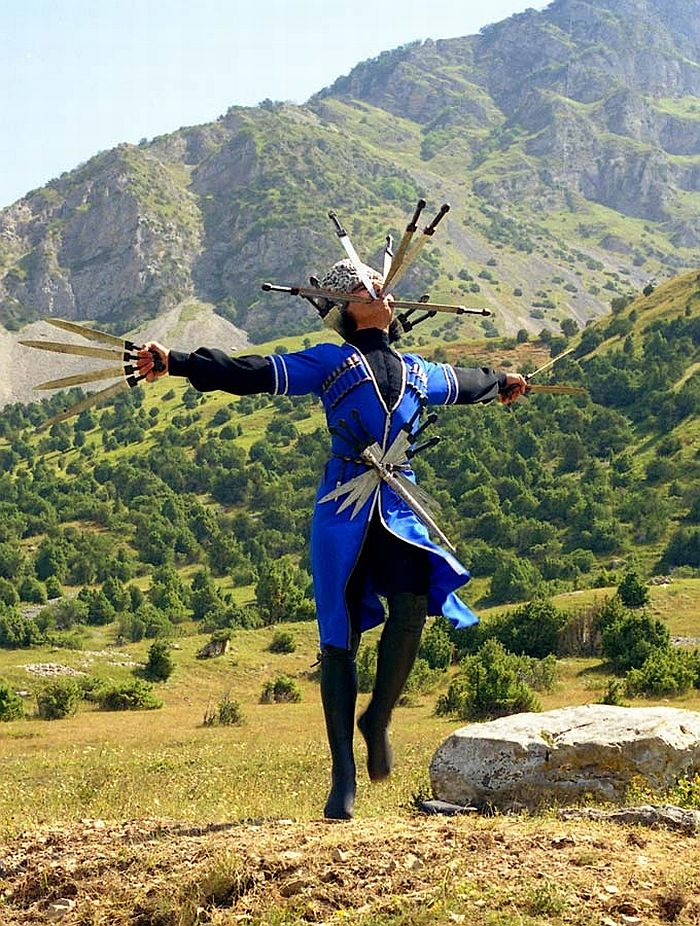
An Ossetian folk dance performance in North Ossetia–Alania, Russia, 2010

== See also ==
- Danza de tijeras (scissors dance)
- Geommu
- Four Scottish Dances
- Long Sword dance
- Stick dance (African-American)
- Tahtib

== Literature ==
- Stephen D Corrsin, Sword Dancing in Europe: A History, London: Hisarlik Press (1997).
