= Juan Ignacio de Iztueta =

Juan Ignacio Iztueta de Zaldibia (1767–1845) was a pioneer in the research of Basque folklore. He wrote several books about Basque music and dance. He dedicated himself to the study of the local culture of the province of Gipuzkoa when the Bergara University was created and the use of the Basque language was abandoned.
