= Makila =

Traditional Basque walking stick

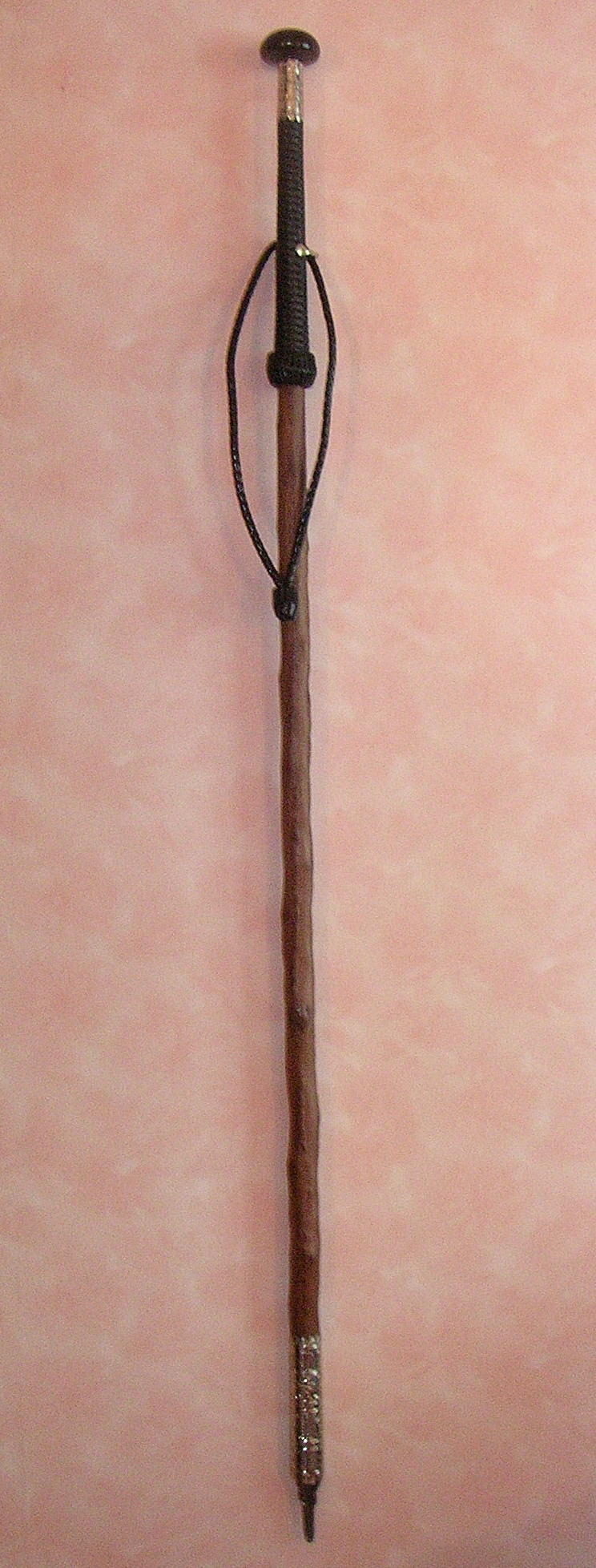
A makila with a horn pommel, woven leather grip and nickel silver fittings

The makila (sometimes spelled makhila) is a traditional Basque walking stick, and is notable as both a practical tool and a cultural symbol of authority and strength.

== Etymology ==
"Makila" in Euskara (Basque language) literally can mean "stick", "walking cane", "rod", "club", or "mace". The word is derived from the Latin bacillum ("little staff"). "Makila" itself carries certain connotations, for instance in the verb form, makilatu, meaning "to bludgeon", or the derived makila-ukaldi, meaning "club-strike" or "mace-strike". The term outside of Basque country has come to be associated with the unique walking stick carried by Basques.

== Appearance ==
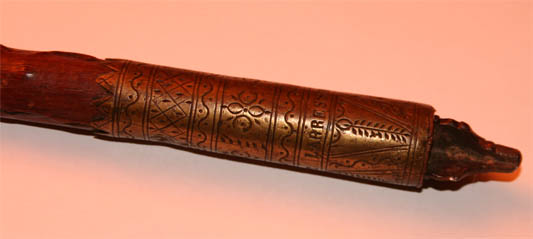
Decorative shoe and ferrule for traction at the base

The makila walking stick consists of an engraved medlar wood shaft cut to a length to suit its owner, generally either hipbone or sternum-height, 1 to 1.4 metres (3.3 to 4.6 ft). The bottom is often shod with steel or other metal and ends in a ferrule (blunt spike for traction). The handle is also often covered with metal or woven leather to form a hand-grip, with a lanyard attached to the bottom of this grip. The stick is capped with a flattened knob or pommel, made of horn, steel, or bronze. The top portion consisting of the knob and hand-grip can be pulled off the top of the stick, revealing a hidden spike or blade, which effectively turns the stick into a short spear. The pommel's shape is said to resemble the beret worn by the Basque shepherd.

Some makila are created for ceremonial purposes, often presented as gifts or awards to individuals. They are decorated with elaborate engravings and their metal parts are made of silver or gold. These are often 1.2 m (4 ft) long rather than a custom length.

== History and crafting ==
The design of the makila is centuries old, and remains largely unchanged. There is little information known on its exact origin, but it may possibly be related to medieval times, as a concealable derivative of a particular form of lance or hunting spear.

The manufacturing process is as rooted in tradition as the finished product, and can take years to complete. It begins in spring, with the craftsman selecting a suitable branch from a medlar tree and carving a design into the living wood while it is still attached. The branch is left alone until late fall, during which the wood heals and expands the design on its surface. The craftsman must then return to where he found the tree and cut the branch down. The bark is then stripped off and the shaft is straightened out using careful heating in a kiln. After this, the stick must be dried by being stored for several years. Once this has happened, the wood is stained using a method that employs manure or quicklime to chemically burn and darken the wood, and then fitted with the various metal bands and fittings. The craftsman will sign his work with his family symbol or name, and also will engrave the handle or pommel with the recipients name, family crest or other text as requested.

== Use ==
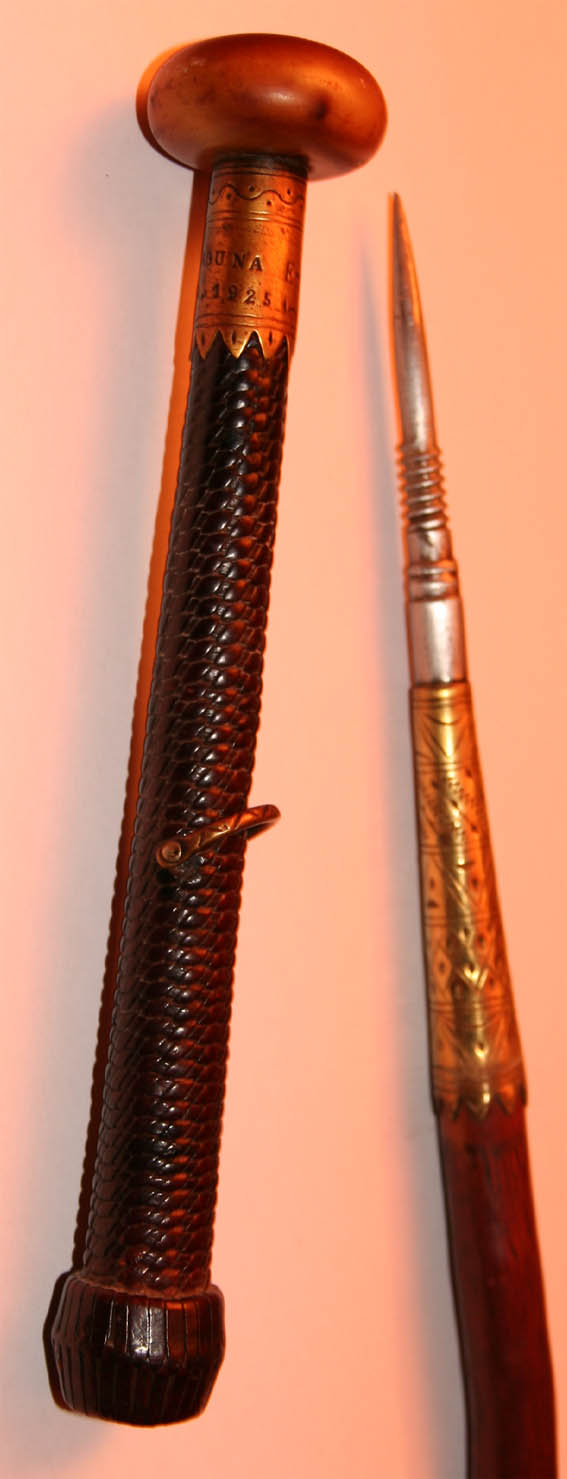
Makila with hidden steel spike

The makila is a practical walking stick and a weapon for self-defense. They were (and still are) carried by shepherds to help guide their flocks as well as defend against wolves and other wild predators. They are carried by hunters and hikers in the Basque country as walking aids, and they are used in traditional folk dances.

The makila can be swung by the handle for fast, light strikes or used the opposite way to strike with the pommel as an effective bludgeon. The concealed spike can be used to deadly effect either as a thrusting weapon, or thrown as a last resort.

== See also ==
- Basque Country
- Swordstick
